= Grade II* listed buildings in Wellingborough (borough) =

There are over 20,000 Grade II* listed buildings in England. This page is a list of these buildings in the former district of Wellingborough in Northamptonshire, which now forms part of the North Northamptonshire unitary authority.

== Wellingborough ==
Name	Location	Type	Completed (Note: The date given is the date used by Historic England as significant for the initial building or that of an important part in the structure's description.)	Date designated	Grid ref. (Note: Sometimes known as OSGB36, the grid reference is based on the British national grid reference system used by the Ordnance Survey.) Geo-coordinates	Entry number (Note: The "List Entry Number" is a unique number assigned to each listed building and scheduled monument by Historic England.)	Image
22 High Street	Easton Maudit, Wellingborough	House	c. 1500	2 August 1972	SP8883258738; 52°13′11″N 0°42′04″W	1040784	Upload Photo
Ecton Hall	Ecton, Wellingborough	Country House	16th century	28 May 1954	SP8293963602; 52°15′52″N 0°47′10″W	1189661	Ecton Hall More images
Ecton House	Ecton, Wellingborough	Vicarage	c. 1693	28 May 1954	SP8284463613; 52°15′52″N 0°47′15″W	1189693	Ecton House More images
Laundry and Game Larder about 30m north-west of Ecton Hall	Ecton, Wellingborough	Estate Laundry	Mid 18th century	13 May 1986	SP8292363640; 52°15′53″N 0°47′11″W	1189673	Upload Photo
Summerhouse about 250m north-east of Ecton Hall	Ecton, Wellingborough	Summerhouse	Late 17th century or mid 18th century	28 May 1954	SP8302463752; 52°15′56″N 0°47′05″W	1040786	Upload Photo
The Manor House	Ecton, Wellingborough	Manor House	1694	28 May 1954	SP8277863402; 52°15′45″N 0°47′19″W	1040756	Upload Photo
Charity House and Attached Walls	Finedon, Wellingborough	House	1712	23 September 1950	SP9135971947; 52°20′17″N 0°39′38″W	1371768	Upload Photo
Vicarage, Chantry House, Bede House and attached Carriage House	Finedon, Wellingborough	House	1688	23 September 1950	SP9119371975; 52°20′18″N 0°39′47″W	1371744	Upload Photo
Church of St Nicholas	Great Doddington, Wellingborough	Church	Late 12th century	28 May 1954	SP8811564837; 52°16′29″N 0°42′36″W	1189920	Church of St Nicholas More images
Church of All Saints	Great Harrowden, Wellingborough	Church	12th century	28 May 1954	SP8802870846; 52°19′43″N 0°42′35″W	1040771	Church of All Saints More images
Gates, Gatepiers and Railings about 90m west of Harrowden Hall	The Slips, Great Harrowden, Wellingborough	Gate	Early 18th century	28 May 1954	SP8810070873; 52°19′44″N 0°42′31″W	1190526	Gates, Gatepiers and Railings about 90m west of Harrowden Hall
Statue about 30m north-east of Harrowden Hall	The Slips, Great Harrowden, Wellingborough	Statue	Early 18th century	26 May 1981	SP8823370871; 52°19′44″N 0°42′24″W	1040732	Upload Photo
Statue about 30m south-east of Harrowden Hall	The Slips, Great Harrowden, Wellingborough	Statue	Early 18th century	26 May 1981	SP8822870825; 52°19′42″N 0°42′24″W	1371697	Upload Photo
Statue about 60m south-east of Harrowden Hall	The Slips, Great Harrowden, Wellingborough	Statue	Early 18th century	26 May 1981	SP8825870820; 52°19′42″N 0°42′23″W	1040733	Upload Photo
The Manor House	Great Harrowden, Wellingborough	Manor House	13th century	28 May 1954	SP8793070866; 52°19′44″N 0°42′40″W	1371674	Upload Photo
Church of St Mary	Grendon, Wellingborough	Church	Mid C12-C14	28 May 1954	SP8788560446; 52°14′07″N 0°42′52″W	1190552	Church of St Mary More images
Grendon Hall	Grendon, Wellingborough	Country House	Late 16th century	28 May 1954	SP8803860823; 52°14′19″N 0°42′44″W	1040746	Grendon Hall More images
Church of St Leonard	Hardwick, Wellingborough	Church	13th century	28 May 1954	SP8506869777; 52°19′10″N 0°45′12″W	1040750	Church of St Leonard More images
Manor Farmhouse	Hardwick, Wellingborough	Farmhouse	14th century	28 May 1954	SP8510869753; 52°19′09″N 0°45′10″W	1293700	Upload Photo
Chester House and attached Cottage to East and attached Walls to South and West	Irchester, Wellingborough	Farmhouse	Late 17th century and 18th century	28 May 1954	SP9186466879; 52°17′33″N 0°39′16″W	1371729	Upload Photo
Church of St Peter	Isham, Wellingborough	Church	Late 12th century to 14th century	28 May 1954	SP8850073947; 52°21′23″N 0°42′07″W	1040722	Church of St Peter More images
Church of St Mary	Little Harrowden, Wellingborough	Church	Late 12th century	28 May 1954	SP8715971679; 52°20′11″N 0°43′20″W	1371694	Church of St Mary More images
Church of All Saints	Mears Ashby, Wellingborough	Church	C12-C14	28 May 1954	SP8384666653; 52°17′30″N 0°46′20″W	1040692	Church of All Saints More images
Mears Ashby Hall	Mears Ashby, Wellingborough	Country House	1637	28 May 1954	SP8397766416; 52°17′22″N 0°46′13″W	1040699	Upload Photo
Church of St Mary	Orlingbury, Wellingborough	Church	c. 1843	2 August 1972	SP8595272362; 52°20′33″N 0°44′23″W	1040666	Church of St Mary More images
Gatepier about 45m north-east of the Old Rectory	Orlingbury, Wellingborough	Gate Pier	Mid 18th century	2 August 1972	SP8613472291; 52°20′31″N 0°44′14″W	1371724	Upload Photo
Orlingbury Hall and attached Wall and Outbuildings to North East	Orlingbury, Wellingborough	Country House	16th century	28 May 1954	SP8611872174; 52°20′27″N 0°44′15″W	1040668	Upload Photo
The Old Rectory	Orlingbury, Wellingborough	House	1986	28 May 1954	SP8614072238; 52°20′29″N 0°44′13″W	1191565	Upload Photo
Church of St Peter and St Paul	Sywell, Wellingborough	Church	12th century	28 May 1954	SP8216767210; 52°17′49″N 0°47′48″W	1040676	Church of St Peter and St Paul More images
Sywell Hall	Sywell, Wellingborough	Country House	c. 1600	28 May 1954	SP8228167372; 52°17′54″N 0°47′41″W	1040679	Upload Photo
Church of St Mary the Virgin	Wilby, Wellingborough	Church	13th century	28 May 1954	SP8666466174; 52°17′13″N 0°43′51″W	1040680	Church of St Mary the Virgin More images
Wilby House	Wilby, Wellingborough	Country House	Late 17th century and early 18th century	28 May 1954	SP8663665946; 52°17′05″N 0°43′53″W	1192006	Upload Photo
Church of St Mary	Wollaston, Wellingborough	Church	13th century	28 May 1954	SP9087563079; 52°15′30″N 0°40′12″W	1286637	Church of St Mary More images
All Hallows Church Hall	Wellingborough	Church Hall	C20	23 September 1950	SP8911967965; 52°18′09″N 0°41′40″W	1040619	Upload Photo
The Golden Hind Hotel and Coleman Bird Associates Shop	Wellingborough	Courtyard	c. 1645	9 June 1970	SP8920067778; 52°18′03″N 0°41′36″W	1286782	The Golden Hind Hotel and Coleman Bird Associates Shop More images
United Reformed Church	Wellingborough	Church	c. 1875	9 June 1970	SP8897868001; 52°18′11″N 0°41′47″W	1191513	United Reformed Church More images
