= Wellingborough Borough Council elections =

Local government elections in Northamptonshire, England

The Borough Council of Wellingborough in Northamptonshire, UK was elected every four years. After the last boundary changes in 1999, thirty-six councillors were elected from 16 wards. The council was abolished in 2021, with the area becoming part of North Northamptonshire.

== Political control ==
The first election was held in 1973. The council then acted as a shadow authority alongside the outgoing authorities until 1 April 1974 when it formally came into being. From 1974 until its abolition in 2021, political control of the council was as follows:

Party in control	Years
No overall control	1974–1976
Conservative	1976–1995
No overall control	1995–1999
Labour	1999–2003
Conservative	2003–2021

=== Leadership ===
The leaders of the council from 1991 until the council's abolition in 2021 were:

Councillor	Party	From	To
Glyn Addis	Conservative		Oct 1991
Derek Hooton	Conservative	Oct 1991	May 1997
Graham Ridge	Labour	27 May 1997	May 2003
Eileen Higgins	Conservative	May 2003	2005
John Bailey	Conservative	2005	2011
Paul Bell	Conservative	2011	2016
Martin Griffiths	Conservative	2016	31 Mar 2021

== Council elections ==
- 1973 Wellingborough Borough Council election
- 1976 Wellingborough Borough Council election
- 1979 Wellingborough Borough Council election
- 1983 Wellingborough Borough Council election (New ward boundaries)
- 1987 Wellingborough Borough Council election
- 1991 Wellingborough Borough Council election
- 1995 Wellingborough Borough Council election
- 1999 Wellingborough Borough Council election (New ward boundaries increased the number of seats by 2)
- 2003 Wellingborough Borough Council election
- 2007 Wellingborough Borough Council election
- 2011 Wellingborough Borough Council election
- 2015 Wellingborough Borough Council election (New ward boundaries)

== Election results ==
	Overall control	Conservative	Labour	Independent
2015	Conservative	27	9	-
2011	Conservative	27	9	-
2007	Conservative	30	4	2
2003	Conservative	27	9	-
1999	Labour	15	20	1

== Borough result maps ==
1999 results map

2003 results map

2007 results map

2011 results map

2015 results map

== By-election results ==
=== 1995-1999 ===
Brickhill By-Election 16 October 1997
Party	Candidate	Votes	%	±%
Labour		694	54.6	+13.5
Conservative		530	41.7	−8.5
UKIP		47	3.7	+3.7
Majority		164	12.9	
Turnout		1,271	29.4	
Labour gain from Conservative		Swing		

=== 2003-2007 ===
Croyland By-Election 21 October 2004
Party	Candidate	Votes	%	±%
Conservative	Lesley Callnon	469	39.3	−17.1
Labour	Andrew Scarborough	445	37.3	−6.3
UKIP	Anthony Ellwood	173	14.5	+14.5
Liberal Democrats	Penelope Wilkins	105	8.8	+8.8
Majority		24	2.0	
Turnout		1,192	23.4	
Conservative hold		Swing		

Hemmingwell By-Election 6 April 2006
Party	Candidate	Votes	%	±%
Conservative	Graham Lawman	885	61.1	−4.3
Labour	Catherine Mulholland	455	31.4	−3.2
Green	Jonathan Hornett	62	4.3	+4.3
UKIP	James Wrench	45	3.1	+3.1
Majority		430	29.7	
Turnout		1,447	27.8	
Conservative hold		Swing		

Croyland By-Election 1 June 2006
Party	Candidate	Votes	%	±%
Conservative	Bruce Thomas	655	47.6	+8.3
Labour	Patricia Cass	488	35.4	−1.9
UKIP	Anthony Ellwood	162	11.8	−2.7
Green	Jonathan Hornett	71	5.1	+5.1
Majority		167	12.2	+10.2
Turnout		1,376		
Conservative gain from Independent		Swing		

=== 2007-2011 ===
Croyland By-Election 18 October 2007
Party	Candidate	Votes	%	±%
Conservative	Martin Griffiths	698	52.6	−7.3
Labour	Andrew Scarborough	448	33.8	−6.3
Independent	Ray Miles	125	9.4	+9.4
Green	Jonathan Hornett	55	4.1	+4.1
Majority		250	18.8	
Turnout		1,326	25.4	
Conservative hold		Swing		

West By-Election 22 November 2007
Party	Candidate	Votes	%	±%
Conservative	Jim Bass	363	66.0	+8.3
Liberal Democrats	Stuart Simons	149	27.1	+27.1
Labour	Peter Wright	38	6.9	+6.9
Majority		214	38.9	
Turnout		550	37.0	
Conservative hold		Swing		

Redwell West By-Election 27 March 2008
Party	Candidate	Votes	%	±%
Conservative	Andrew Bigley	665	59.0	−18.5
BNP	David Robinson	177	15.7	+15.7
Labour	Elaine Baggott	169	15.0	−7.5
Liberal Democrats	Jane Brown	40	3.5	+3.5
UKIP	Tony Ellwood	39	3.5	+3.5
Green	Jonathan Hornett	37	3.3	+3.3
Majority		488	43.3	−11.7
Turnout		1127	47.1	
Conservative hold		Swing		

Wollaston By-Election 19 June 2008
Party	Candidate	Votes	%	±%
Conservative	Jo Beirne	816	81.1	+10.6
Independent	Peter Wright	97	9.7	+9.7
Liberal Democrats	Jane Brown	93	9.2	+9.2
Majority		719	71.4	
Turnout		1006	32.9	−6.6
Conservative hold		Swing		

Brickhill By-Election 4 June 2009
Party	Candidate	Votes	%	±%
Conservative	Geoffrey Simmons	750	47.3	+1.6
Labour	Patricia Jones	316	19.9	−11.3
Green	Jonathan Hornett	189	11.9	+11.9
Independent	Jacqueline Norton	183	11.5	−11.5
Liberal Democrats	Julie White	149	9.4	+9.4
Majority		434	27.3	
Turnout		1587	37.7	−2.8
Conservative hold		Swing		

Swanspool By-Election 23 July 2009
Party	Candidate	Votes	%	±%
Conservative	Robert Hawkes	548	46.0	−9.6
Labour	Helena Reynolds	361	30.3	−14.0
Liberal Democrats	Daniel Jones	162	13.6	+13.6
BNP	David Robinson	120	10.1	+10.1
Majority		187	15.7	
Turnout		1,191	27.4	
Conservative hold		Swing		

Redwell West By-Election 11 March 2010
Party	Candidate	Votes	%	±%
Conservative	John Raymond	570	57.2	−20.3
Labour	Graham Sherwood	186	18.7	−3.9
BNP	David Robinson	84	8.4	+8.4
Liberal Democrats	Penelope Wilkins	72	7.2	+7.2
English Democrat	Terence Spencer	62	6.2	+6.2
Green	Jonathan Hornett	23	2.3	+2.3
Majority		384	38.5	
Turnout		997	38.4	
Conservative hold		Swing		

Earls Barton By-Election 17 June 2010
Party	Candidate	Votes	%	±%
Conservative	Andrew Atkinson	639	48.0	+19.8
Labour	Peter Wright	425	31.9	−7.2
Liberal Democrats	Daniel Jones	229	17.2	+17.2
Green	Jonathan Hornett	38	2.9	+2.9
Majority		214	16.1	
Turnout		1,331		
Conservative gain from Independent		Swing		

=== 2011-2015 ===
Earls Barton By-Election 2 May 2013
Party	Candidate	Votes	%	±%
Conservative	Robert Gough	626	41.5	−3.8
Labour	Kevin Watts	417	27.7	−27.0
UKIP	Debra Elderton	396	26.3	+26.3
Liberal Democrats	Daniel Jones	69	4.6	+4.6
Majority		209	13.9	
Turnout		1,508		
Conservative gain from Labour		Swing		

Redwell West By-Election 2 May 2013
Party	Candidate	Votes	%	±%
Conservative	Veronica Waters	396	45.6	−20.3
UKIP	Allan Shipham	244	28.1	+28.1
Labour	Elfred Brown	193	27.7	−11.9
English Democrat	Marshall Walker	35	4.0	+4.0
Majority		152	17.5	
Turnout		868		
Conservative hold		Swing		

=== 2015-2021 ===
Finedon By-Election 29 September 2016
Party	Candidate	Votes	%	±%
Conservative	Barbara Bailey	758	62.3	+15.4
Labour	Steve Ayland	235	19.3	−7.7
UKIP	Allan Shipham	137	11.3	−14.9
Liberal Democrats	John Wheaver	86	7.1	+7.1
Majority		523	43.0	
Turnout		1,216		
Conservative hold		Swing		

Finedon By-Election 12 September 2019
Party	Candidate	Votes	%	±%
Conservative	Andrew Weatherill	547	52.2	−10.1
Independent	Laurence Harper	227	21.7	+21.7
Green	Marion Turner-Hawes	134	12.8	+12.8
Labour	Isobel Stevenson	76	7.3	−12.0
Liberal Democrats	Chris Nelson	64	6.1	−1.0
Majority		320	30.5	
Turnout		1,048		
Conservative hold		Swing		
