= Wellingborough =

Market town in Northamptonshire, England

Coordinates: 52°18′10″N 0°41′40″W

- Town
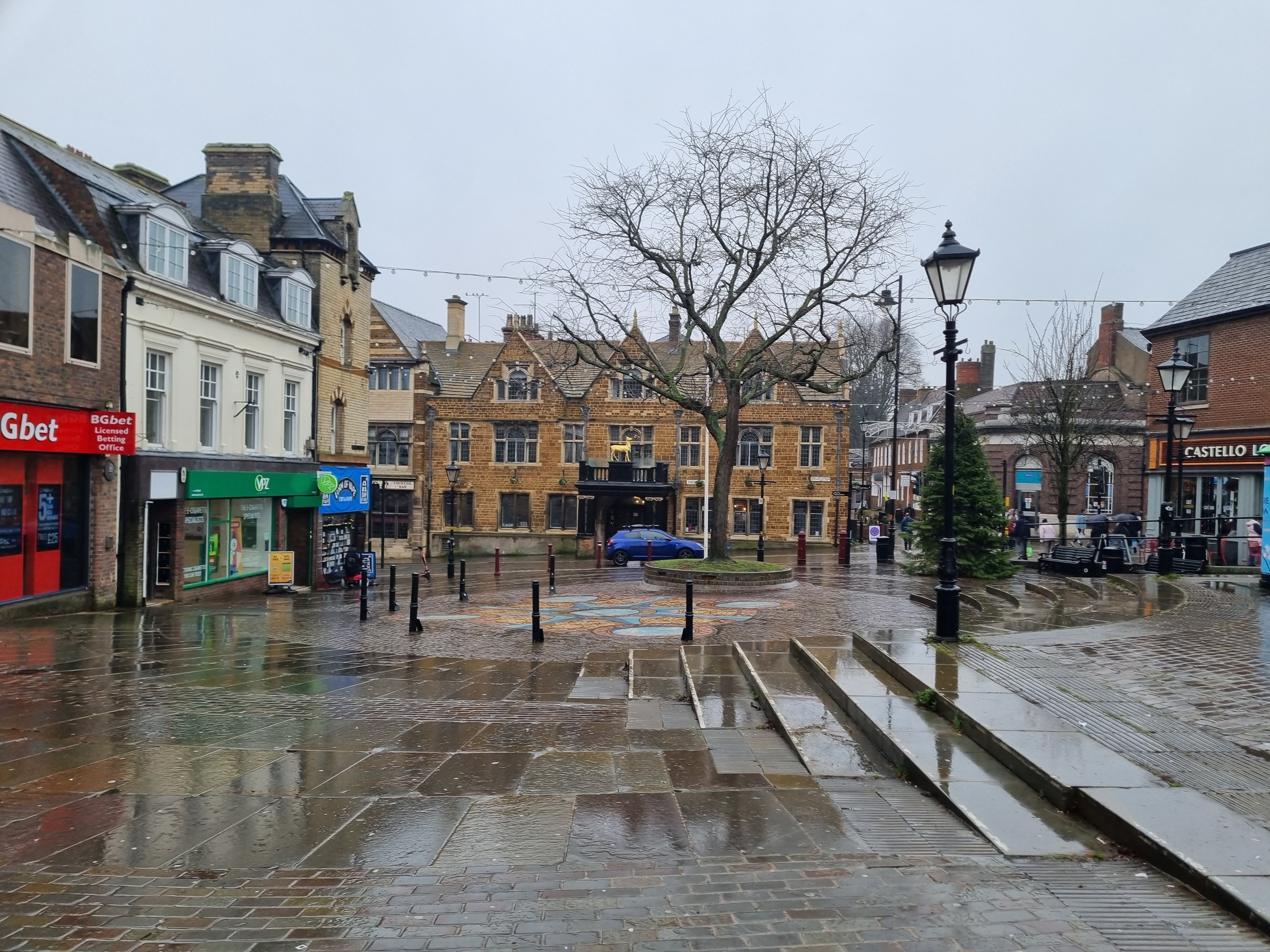
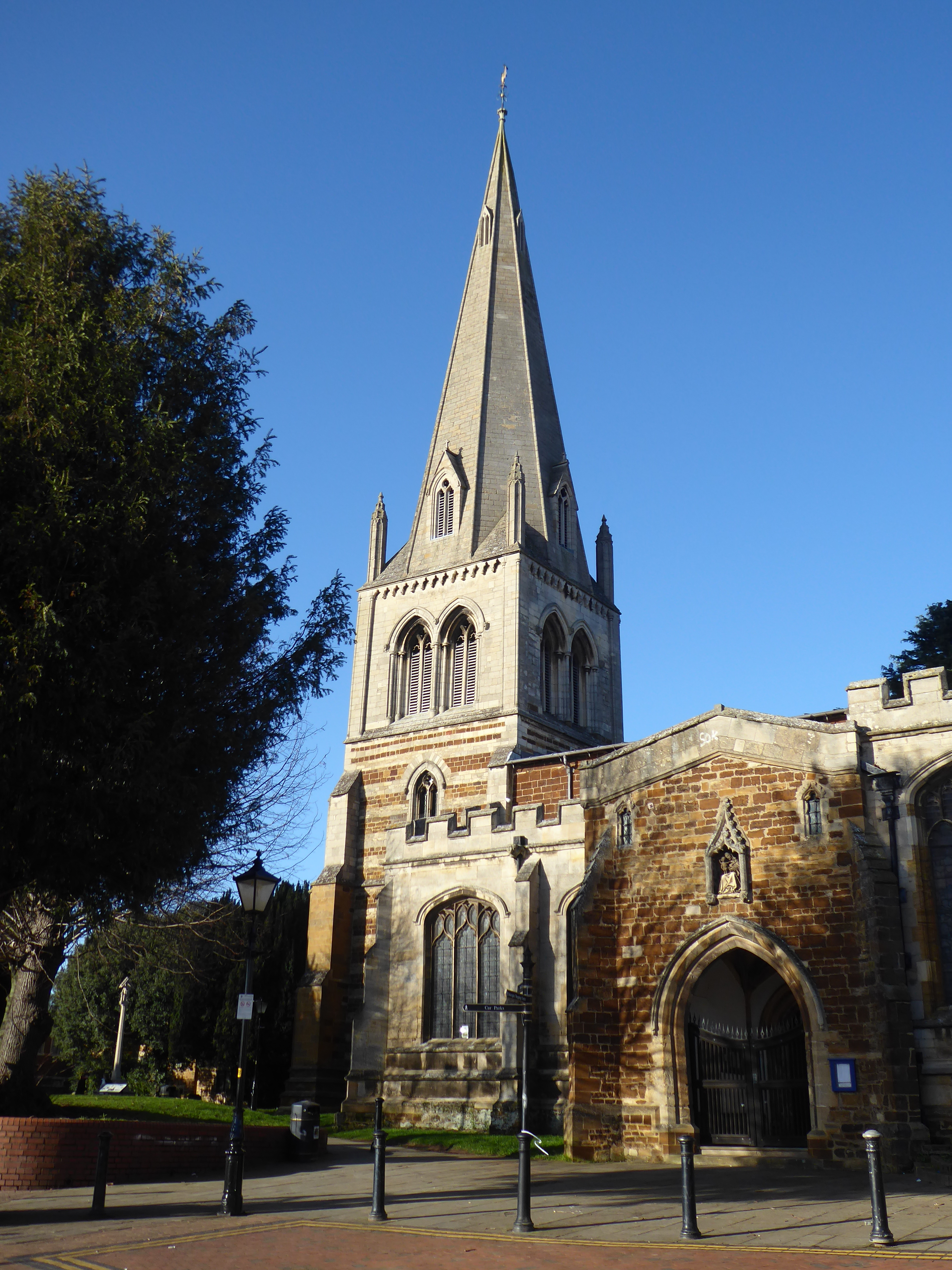
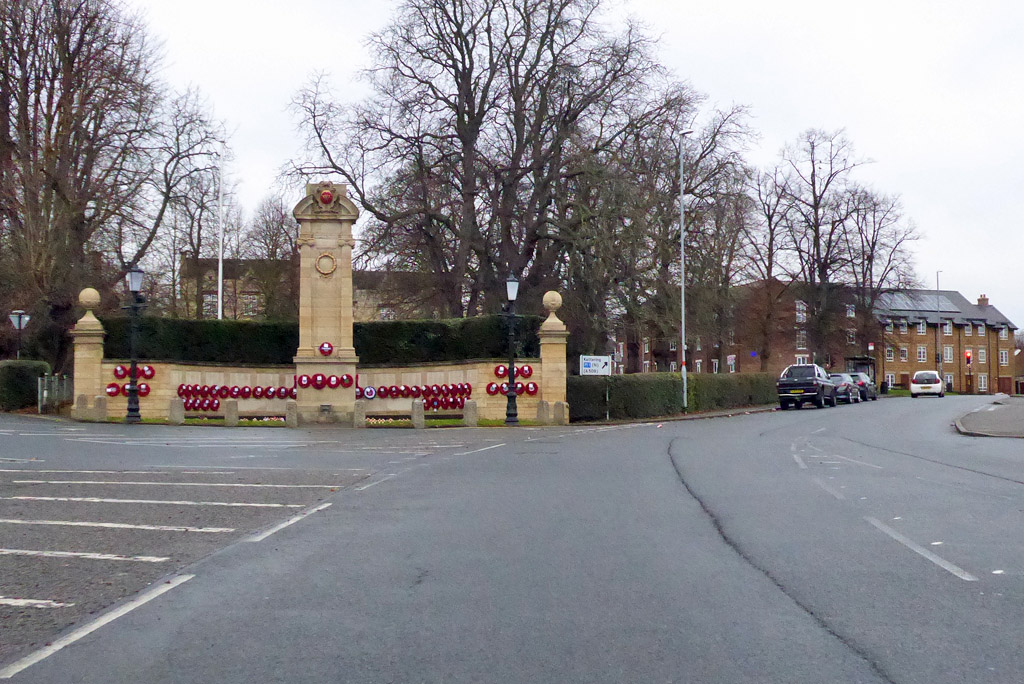
- Town Centre All Hallows Church War Memorial

- Location within Northamptonshire
- Population: 56,564 (2021 Census)
- Demonym: Wellingburian
- OS grid reference: SP8967
  - London: 65 miles (105 km)
- Unitary authority: North Northamptonshire
- Ceremonial county: Northamptonshire
- Region: East Midlands
- Country: England
- Sovereign state: United Kingdom
- Areas of the town: List: Hemmingwell; Kingsway; Queensway; Redhill Grange; Town Centre; Wilby
- Post town: WELLINGBOROUGH
- Postcode district: NN8 NN9
- Dialling code: 01933
- Police: Northamptonshire
- Fire: Northamptonshire
- Ambulance: East Midlands
- UK Parliament: Wellingborough and Rushden
- Website: www.wellingboroughtowncouncil.gov.uk

Wellingborough (/ˈwɛlɪŋbrə/ WEL-ing-brə) is a market town in the North Northamptonshire district of Northamptonshire, England, 65 miles (105 km) from London and 10 miles (16 km) from Northampton, north of the River Nene.

Originally named "Wendelingburgh" (the stronghold of Wændel's people), the Anglo-Saxon settlement is mentioned in the Domesday Book of 1086 as "Wendelburie". The town's market was granted a royal charter in 1201 by King John. At the 2021 census, it had a population of 56,564. The town's built up area includes suburbs Hemmingwell, Kingsway, Queensway, Redhill Grange, Wilby, Stanton Cross, Glenvale Park and Waendle View.

== History ==
The town was established in the Anglo-Saxon period and was called "Wendelingburgh", deriving from the Old English waendelburh or waendelingburh meaning 'Waendel's burh' (fortification). It is surrounded by five wells: Redwell, Hemmingwell, Witche's Well, Lady's Well and Whytewell, which appear on its coat of arms. Henrietta Maria, the Queen Consort of King Charles I, came with her physician Théodore de Mayerne to take the waters on 14 July 1627.

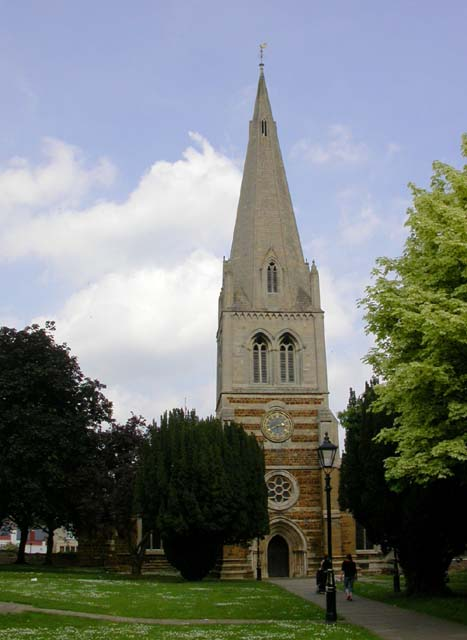
All Hallows Church

The medieval town of Wellingborough housed a modest monastic grange – now the Jacobean Croyland Abbey – which was an offshoot of the monastery of Crowland (or Croyland) Abbey, near Peterborough, some 30 miles (48 km) down-river. This part of the town is known as Croyland.

All Hallows Church is the oldest existing building in Wellingborough and dates from c. 1160. The manor of Wellingborough belonged to Crowland Abbey Lincolnshire, from Saxon times and the monks probably built the original church. The earliest part of the building is the Norman doorway opening in from the later south porch. The church was enlarged with the addition of more side chapels and by the end of the 13th century had assumed more or less its present plan. The west tower, crowned with a graceful broach spire rising to 160 feet (49 m), was completed about 1270, after which the chancel was rebuilt and given the east window twenty years later. The church was restored in 1861 by Edmund Francis Law. The 20th-century Church of St Mary was built by Ninian Comper.

Wellingborough was given a Market Charter dated 3 April 1201 when King John granted it to the "Abbot of Croyland and the monks serving God there" continuing, "they shall have a market at Wendligburg (Wellingborough) for one day each week that is Wednesday".

In the Elizabethan era the Lord of the manor, Sir Christopher Hatton was a sponsor of Sir Francis Drake's expeditions; Drake renamed one of his ships the Golden Hind after the heraldic symbol of the Hatton family. A hotel in a Grade II listed building built in the 17th century, was known variously as the Hind Hotel and later as the Golden Hind Hotel.

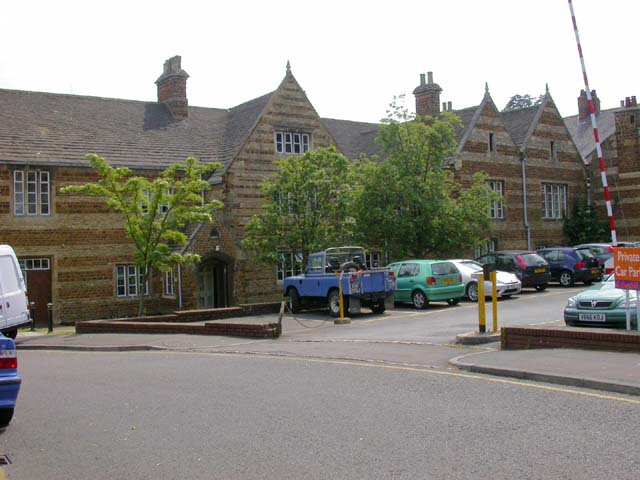
Wellingborough Croyland Abbey

During the English Civil War the largest substantial conflict in the area was the Battle of Naseby in 1645, although a minor skirmish in the town resulted in the killing of a parliamentarian officer Captain John Sawyer. Severe reprisals followed which included the carrying off to Northampton of the parish priest, Thomas Jones, and 40 prisoners by a group of Roundheads. However, after the Civil War Wellingborough was home to a colony of Diggers. Little is known about this period.

Wellingborough was bombed during World War II, on Monday 3 August 1942. Six people were killed and 55 injured; fortunately, being a bank holiday, thousands of people were away at a fair at a nearby village. Many houses and other buildings in the centre of the town were damaged in the attack.

Originally the town had two railway stations: the first called Wellingborough London Road, opened in 1845 and closed in 1966, linked Peterborough with Northampton. The second station, Wellingborough Midland Road, is still in operation with trains to London and the East Midlands. Since then the 'Midland Road' was dropped from the station name. The Midland Road station opened in 1857 with trains serving Kettering and a little later Corby, was linked in 1867 to London St Pancras. In 1898 in the Wellingborough rail accident six or seven people died and around 65 were injured. In the 1880s two businessmen held a public meeting to build three tram lines in Wellingborough, the group merged with a similar company in Newport Pagnell who started to lay tram tracks, but within two years the plans were abandoned due to lack of funds.

== Governance ==
Wellingborough is part of the unitary authority of North Northamptonshire. Until 2021 it was seat of Borough Council of Wellingborough The borough council covered 20 settlements including the town together with Bozeat, Earls Barton, Easton Maudit, Ecton, Finedon, Great Doddington, Great Harrowden, Grendon, Hardwick, Irchester, Isham, Little Harrowden, Little Irchester, Mears Ashby, Orlingbury, Strixton, Sywell, Wilby, and Wollaston.

In April 2021 the Borough of Wellingborough was abolished and replaced by a new unitary authority called North Northamptonshire, which covers the areas of the districts of Wellingborough, Corby, East Northamptonshire and Kettering. Elections for the new authorities were due to be held on 7 May 2020, but were delayed due to the COVID-19 pandemic.

Concurrent with these changes, the unparished area of Wellingborough was established as a civil parish and gained a new Town Council, eliminating the need for charter trustees. Wellingborough has a mayor.

Wellingborough is part of the Wellingborough Constituency which includes the town, surrounding villages and other urban areas. The current MP is Gen Kitchen. Most wards in the (former) Borough Council of Wellingborough are covered by the constituency and also include the wards in the (former) East Northamptonshire district, the wards are: Bozeat, Brickhill, Croyland, Finedon, Great Doddington and Wilby, Harrowden & Sywell (excluding Ecton, Mears Ashby, and Sywell which all appear in the Daventry constituency due to overlapping parliamentary and local government boundary reviews), Hatton, Higham Ferrers Lancaster, Higham Ferrers Chichele, Irchester, Isebrook, Queensway, Redwell, Rixon, Rushden Hayden, Rushden Spencer, Rushden Bates, Rushden Sartoris, Rushden Pemberton, Swanspool, Victoria, and Wollaston. Wellingborough is currently represented in the House of Commons by Gen Kitchen. In the 1918 general election it became the first constituency in southern England outside London to be represented by the Labour Party.

Prior to Brexit in 2020, Wellingborough was represented by the East Midlands constituency in the European Parliament.

== Geography ==
=== Geology ===
The town is sited on the hills adjoining the flood plain of the River Nene. In the predominantly agrarian Middle Ages, this combination of access to fertile, if flood-prone, valley bottom soils and drier (but heavier and more clay-rich) hillside/ hilltop soils seems to have been good for a mixed agricultural base. The clay-rich hilltop soils are primarily a consequence of blanketing of the area with boulder clay or glacial till during the recent glaciations. On the valley sides and valley floor however, these deposits have been largely washed away in the late glacial period, and in the valley bottom extensive deposits of gravels were laid down, which have largely been exploited for building aggregate in the last century.

=== Iron ore ===
The most economically important aspect of the geology of the area is the Northampton Sands ironstone formation. This is a marine sand of Jurassic age (Bajocian stage), deposited as part of an estuary sequence and overlain by a sequence of limestones and mudrocks. Significant amounts of the sand have been replaced or displaced by iron minerals, giving an average ore grade of around 25 wt% iron. To the west the iron ores have been moderately exploited for a very long time, but their high phosphorus content made them difficult to smelt and produced iron of poor quality until the development of the Bessemer steel-making process and the "basic slag" smelting chemistry, which combine to make high-quality steelmaking possible from these unprepossessing ores. The Northampton Sands were a strategic resource for the United Kingdom in the run-up to World War II, being the best-developed bulk iron-producing processes wholly free from dependence on imported materials. However, because the Northampton Sands share in the regional dip of all the sediments of this part of Britain to the east-south-east, they become increasingly difficult to work as one progresses east across the county.

Iron ore quarrying was a major industry in and around Wellingborough from the 1860s until the 1960s. James Rixon and Wiliam Ashwell opened a major ironworks on the north side of the town in 1870, supplied by the extensive ironstone quarries around Finedon to the east of the town. Three narrow gauge tramways served the iron ore industry, the Wellingborough Tramway, Neilson's Tramway and the Finedonhill Tramway. The Wellingborough Tramway served Rixon's ironworks until 1966.

=== Hydrography ===
Wellingborough has the river Ise to the east, across which are Irthlingborough and Finedon, and the river Nene to the south, across which is Irchester. The Nene formed parts of the boundaries of the historical hundred of Hamferdsho, to which Wellingborough once belonged, and was made navigable past Wellingborough in the middle 18th century. A new channel for it was constructed in the meadows below Wellingborough bridge in 1832.

Swanspool Brook, known in the 19th century as Swans'-pool, runs through the town past the southern end of Sheep Street, and around the erstwhile grounds of Croyland Abbey. A bridge over it was built in 1798, replacing a prior smaller bridge, and in the 19th century an embankment ran for roughly 1/2 mile (0.80 km) alongside the stream from Croyland.

=== Climate ===
Wellingborough experiences an oceanic climate (Köppen climate classification) which is similar to most of the British Isles.

Climate data for Wellingborough, GBR
Month	Jan	Feb	Mar	Apr	May	Jun	Jul	Aug	Sep	Oct	Nov	Dec	Year
Record high °C (°F)	13 (55)	14 (57)	17 (63)	20 (68)	24 (75)	27 (81)	29 (84)	31 (88)	24 (75)	23 (73)	17 (63)	14 (57)	31 (88)
Mean daily maximum °C (°F)	7 (45)	8 (46)	11 (52)	13 (55)	17 (63)	19 (66)	22 (72)	23 (73)	19 (66)	14 (57)	10 (50)	7 (45)	14 (58)
Mean daily minimum °C (°F)	2 (36)	2 (36)	4 (39)	4 (39)	7 (45)	10 (50)	12 (54)	12 (54)	10 (50)	8 (46)	5 (41)	3 (37)	7 (44)
Record low °C (°F)	−15 (5)	−13 (9)	−8 (18)	−5 (23)	−1 (30)	2 (36)	6 (43)	5 (41)	4 (39)	−3 (27)	−10 (14)	−14 (7)	−15 (5)
Average precipitation cm (inches)	4.51 (1.78)	3.39 (1.33)	2.87 (1.13)	4.39 (1.73)	3.49 (1.37)	4.66 (1.83)	4.21 (1.66)	4.69 (1.85)	5.49 (2.16)	5.68 (2.24)	4.8 (1.9)	4.98 (1.96)	53.16 (20.94)

=== Compass ===
Wellingborough's nearest towns are Northampton, Rushden, Higham Ferrers and Irthlingborough.

== Demography ==
Wellingborough's population expanded rapidly from the 1960s and 1970s as agreements were signed between the Urban District Council and London County Council and the Greater London Council for the town to re-house over-spill population from London. Following the post World War II arrival of immigrants from the Commonwealth of Nations into Britain, a sizeable Black Caribbean and Indian/Pakistani community grew up in the market town, and now represents 11% of the town.

== Housing ==
=== Housing estates ===
Wellingborough is home to three large public housing estates: Hemmingwell, Kingsway and Queensway. Hemmingwell as well as a large portion of Queensway were built to re-house over-spill population from London. The town's smaller-scale estates include Spring Gardens and Knights Court. These estates account for a large percentage of Wellingborough's population.

== Economy ==
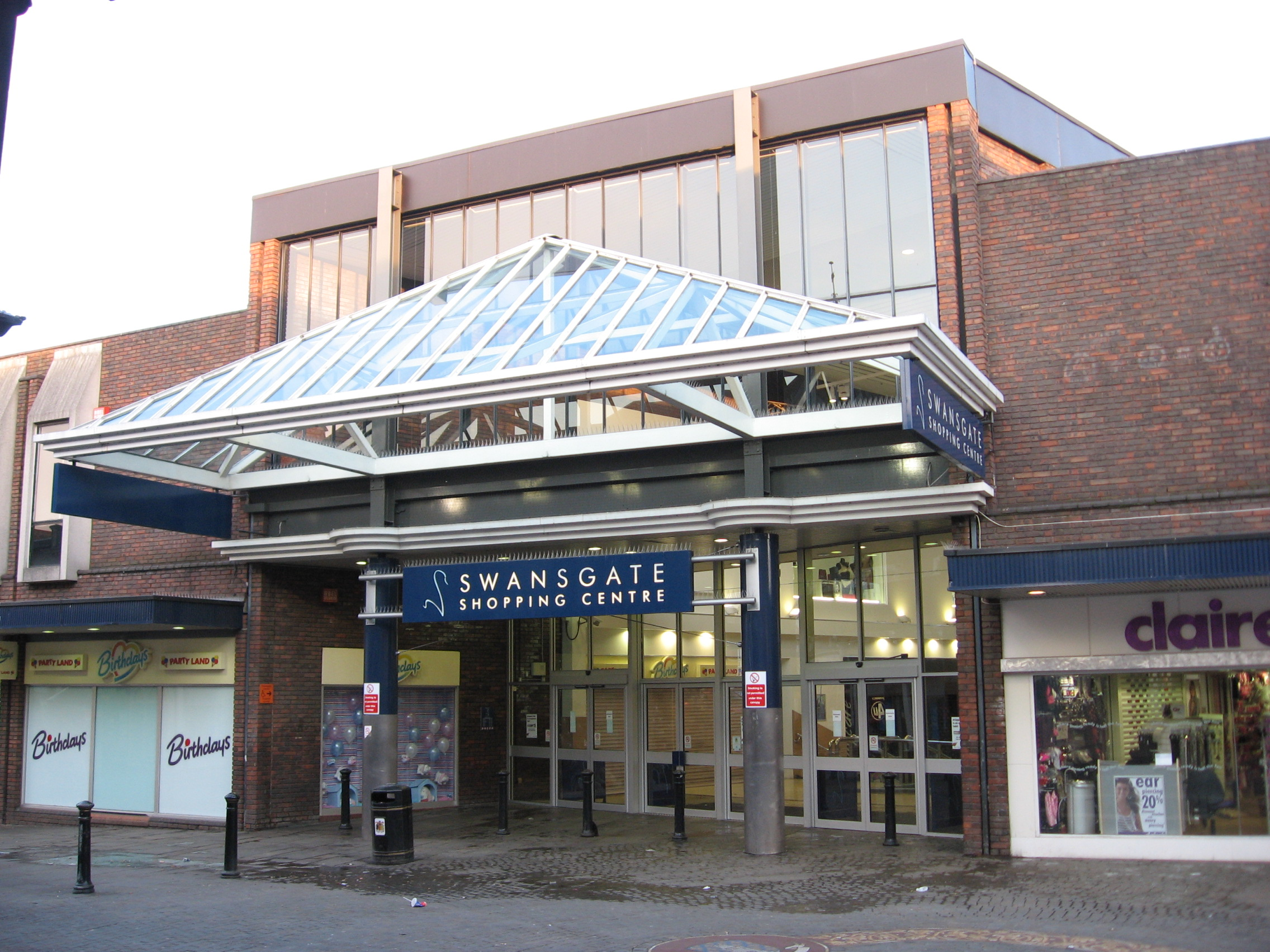
The Swansgate Shopping Centre in 2008

Wellingborough has approximately 2,500 registered businesses within its boundaries. Much of the town centre was redeveloped during the 1970s, when it grew rapidly from London overspill. The Borough Council has adopted a 'Town Centre Action Plan'. The former traditional economic structure based on footwear and engineering is gradually diversifying with wholesale, logistics, and service sectors providing new opportunities for employment.

As a market town, Wellingborough has major high street chains mainly located in the town centre. The only shopping centre, Swansgate, previously known as the Arndale Centre, was built in the 1970s. Since 2009 the Borough Council has been looking at rebuilding the centre and major stores want bigger floor-spaces. Supplementing the town centre shops are several out-of-town retail parks and supermarkets. The town has a market three times a week and a weekly privately organised market.

Other businesses operating within the town include motorsport, high performance engineering, distribution, engineering, environmental technology and renewable energy, digital and creative media, financial and business services, and global brands, once such brand being Cummins UK at Park Farm and Lok'nStore Plc. The revived incarnation of British electrical retailer Comet is also based in the town. There are several industrial estates in the town, these include Park Farm, Denington, Leyland and Finedon Road.

Future developments

As part of its Milton Keynes South Midlands (MKSM) study, the government has identified Wellingborough as one of several towns in Northamptonshire into which growth will be directed over the next thirty years. It allocates 12,800 additional homes to Wellingborough, and will also create additional facilities, further improve the town centre, improve infrastructure and increase employment opportunities. A jobs growth target of 12,400 jobs has been set to accompany the large scale housing growth. A plan for 3,000 homes north of the town has been accepted by the British Government after an appeal by Bee Bee Developments. The plan was first refused by Wellingborough Borough Council.

As a result, plans have been made for a major urban extension in the town, mainly to the east of the railway station. When finished, the town would be around 30% larger and 3,200 new homes would be built on 'Stanton Cross' site, with new schools, bus stops, community centres, shops, a doctor's surgery and new open spaces. The railway station would be developed into an 'interchange' with local buses and trains. The upgrade would provide a new platform, footbridge and new station buildings. Outside the station a new road bridge from Midland Road over the railway line is also planned with a new footbridge to reach the new development. Other plans to include the development of the High Street, Shelley Road and the north of the town areas are also being considered.

In November 2021 development on two fields between Park Farm and the Queensway estate was underway with a mix of one to four-bedroom properties and much needed social housing for the town. The development will comprise 600 properties, including 180 affordable homes, education, health and sports facilities and dedicated open space.

Developer contributions to the town also include money towards the expansion of All Saints Primary School and a new secondary school at Stanton Cross. ECL was appointed as Principal Contractors for the Park Farm’s infrastructure and groundworks.

== Transport ==
The A45 dual carriageway skirting to the south, links the town with the A14, and M1 which also allows links to the east and west of the country. The A45 links Wellingborough with Northampton, Rushden, Higham Ferrers, Raunds, Thrapston, Oundle and Peterborough.

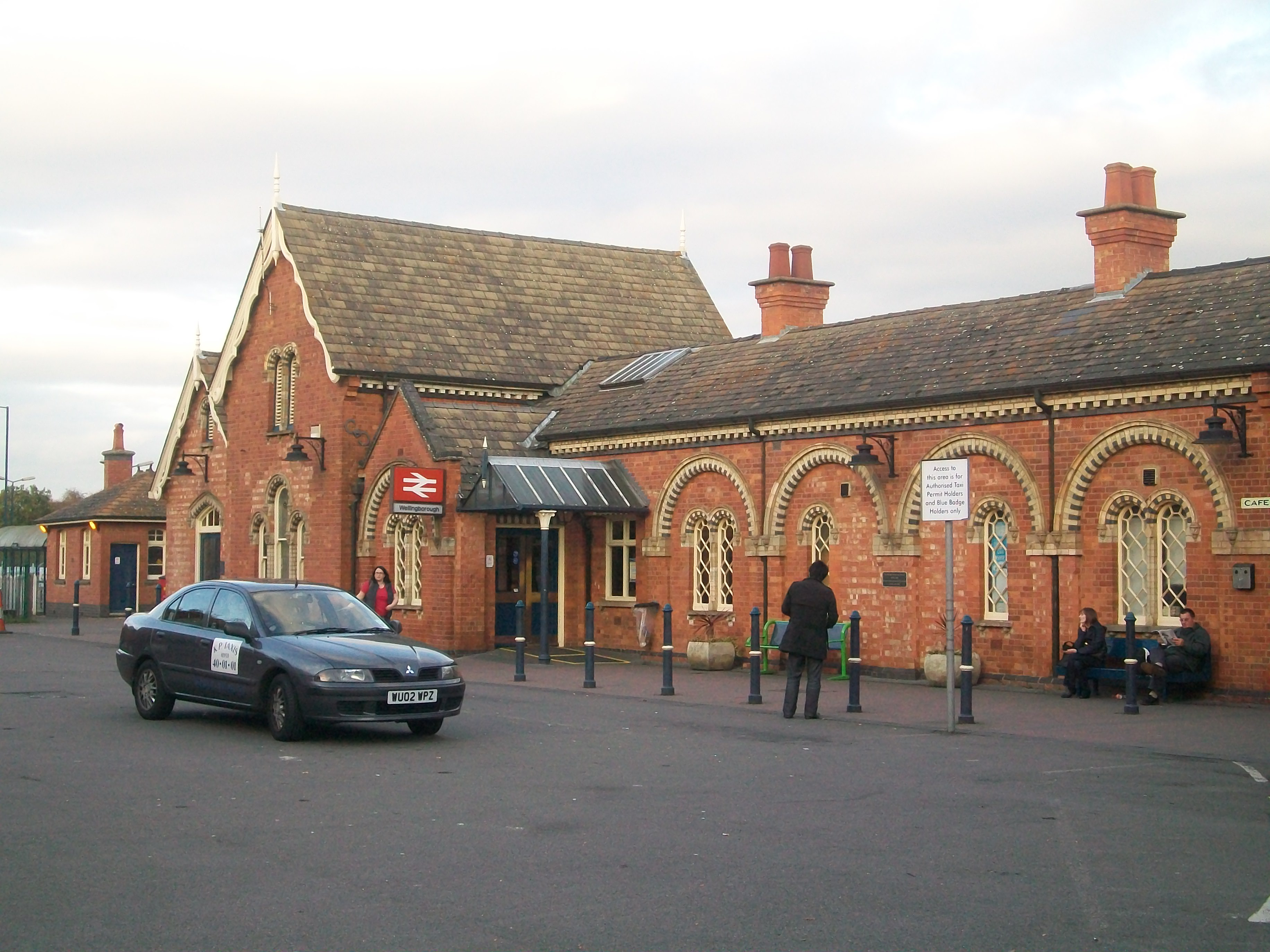
Wellingborough station building

The town is served by a bus network provided by Stagecoach in Northants, CommMiniBus and Cogenhoe & Whiston Parish Council, with local Wellingborough buses the W1, W2, W3, W8 and VH1 links the town centre (Church Street) with local suburbs and villages. Departing every 30 minutes the X4 service also links the town with Milton Keynes, Northampton, Kettering, Corby, Oundle and Peterborough. Other routes include, 90, 48, ChattyBus2 and X46 & X47.

East Midlands Railway operate direct trains to London St Pancras International from Wellingborough railway station, departing every 30 minutes, with an average journey time of around 55 minutes. The railway line also connects Wellingborough with Bedford, Luton, Kettering, Corby, Leicester, Nottingham, Derby, Sheffield and Leeds. Just north of the railway station is a GB Railfreight location, usage is for London Underground maintenance and other freight services. Platform 4 was rebuilt and opened in 2021.

Several UK airports are within two hours' drive of the town, including London Luton, East Midlands, Birmingham and London Stansted. Luton can be reached directly by train while East Midlands and Stansted can be reached by one change at Leicester. Sywell Aerodrome, located 5 miles northwest of Wellingborough, caters for private flying, flight training and corporate flights.

== Education ==
Fourteen government controlled primary schools feed the secondary schools that include: Wellingborough School, a private, fee-paying school with a cadet force, and the state secondary schools of Sir Christopher Hatton Academy, Weavers Academy (formerly the Technical Grammar School & then Weavers School), Wrenn School (formerly the Wellingborough Grammar School) and also gives home to the local Sea Cadet Unit, and Friars School.

The Tresham College of Further and Higher Education has a campus in Wellingborough, as well as locations in Kettering and Corby. It provides further education and offers vocational courses. In collaboration with several universities the college also offers Higher Education options.

The University of Northampton in Northampton, with around 10,000 students on two campuses, offers courses from foundation and undergraduate levels to postgraduate, professional and doctoral qualifications. Subjects include traditional arts, humanities and sciences subjects, as well as entrepreneurship, product design and advertising.

=== Cadet Units ===
The D-Coy Corps of Drums of the Leicestershire, Northamptonshire and Rutland Army Cadet Force is based in the town.

The town also has its own Air Cadet Squadron, 378 (Mannock) Squadron which is the only squadron in the corps to not be named after a geographical location, but after a person, Edward Corringham "Mick" Mannock.

== Culture ==
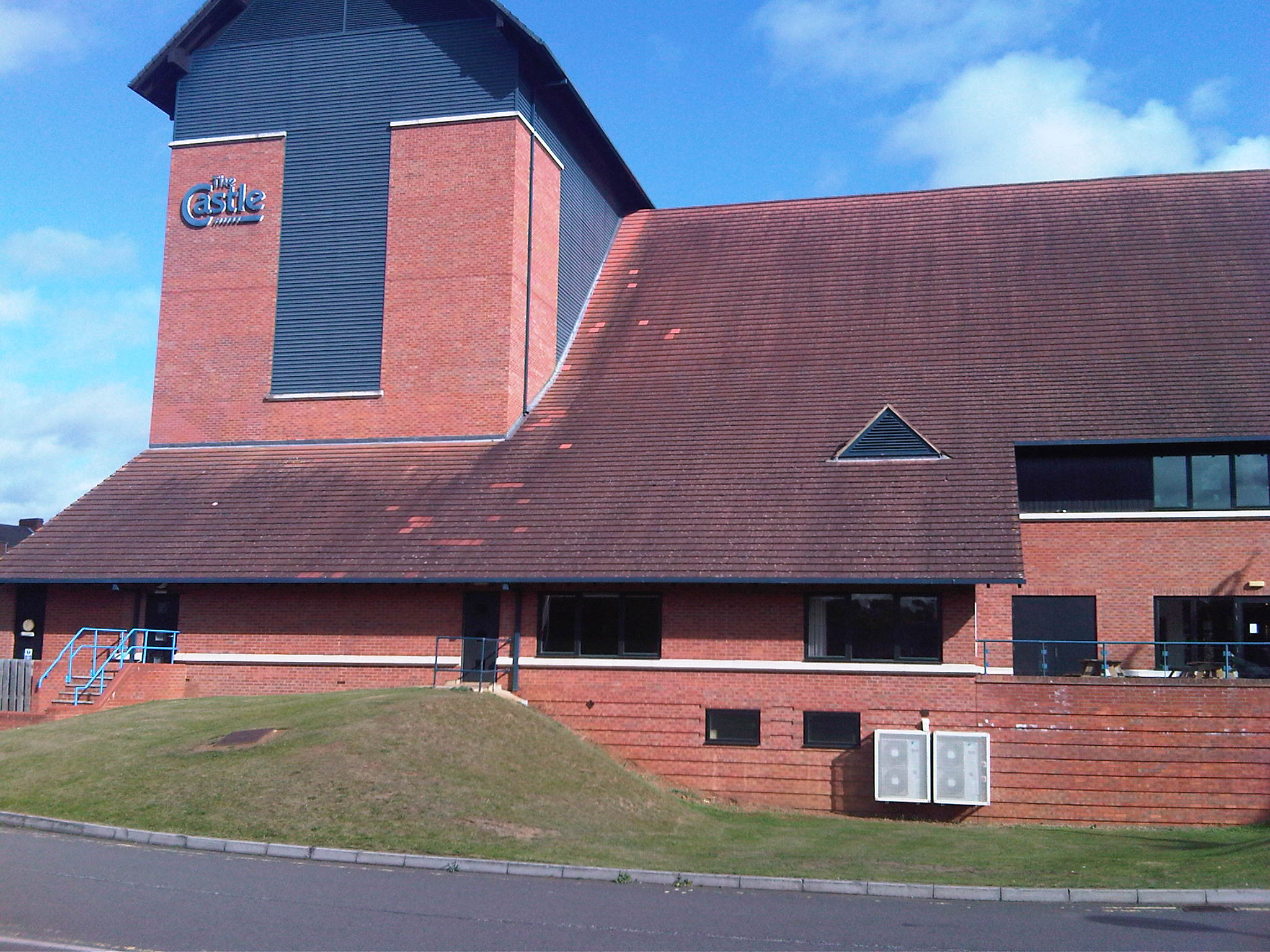
The Castle Theatre

The Castle Theatre was opened in 1995 on the site of Wellingborough's old Cattle Market. It brings not only a theatre to the area but other facilities for local people. Most rooms are used on a daily basis by the local community, users include the Castle Youth Theatre and Youth Dance.

Wellingborough has a public library in the corner of the market square. The Wellingborough Museum, an independent museum run by the Winifred Wharton Trust, located next door to The Castle Theatre, has exhibitions which show the past of Wellingborough and the surrounding villages. The museum is housed in a Victorian swimming pool ("Dulley's Baths") built in 1892, from 1918 to 1995 it was Cox's shoe factory. Accompanying the exhibitions and articles is a souvenir shop and café.

=== Media ===
Local news and television programmes are provided by BBC East and ITV Anglia. Television signals are received from the Sandy Heath TV transmitter.

The town’s local radio stations are BBC Radio Northampton on 104.2 FM, Heart East on 96.6 FM and Smooth East Midlands (formerly Connect FM) on 97.2 FM.

Local newspapers are the Northampton Herald & Post and Northamptonshire Telegraph.

== Sport ==
Wellingborough is home to two football clubs: Wellingborough Town and Wellingborough Whitworth. From 14 April 1928 a short lived, small independent (not affiliated to the sports governing body) greyhound racing track was opened around the football pitch at the Dog and Duck Ground.

In 2009 the town's rugby club was the first club to be awarded the RFU Whole Club Seal of Approval in the East Midlands. Harrowden Hall, a 17th-century building in Great Harrowden village just on the outskirts of the town, is the clubhouse of a privately owned golf course. The four leisure centres and health clubs in Wellingborough include Bannatyne, Redwell, Waendel and Weavers (which is part of Weavers school).

Wellingborough was also served for many years by Club Diana. Club Diana was closed by administrators on 1 June 2011. However it has now been reopened and is available once again. It has a swimming pool, 5 squash courts and a bar and restaurant.

The Waendel Leisure Centre is the main council-owned leisure centre in Wellingborough. The facility includes a six-lane 25-metre competition pool, varying in depth from 1 to 2 metres, and used for many purposes including the main training pool for Wellingborough Amateur Swimming Club. The pool is regularly used for small competitions, as other than Corby Pool it is the only other aptly equipped facility – boasting new starting blocks, as well as an integrated timing system and time board. The pool also has a small, shallow, 'teaching' pool, more suitable for non-swimmers. Waendel also operates a newly refurbished gym on the upper level.

Waendel and Redwell Leisure Centres are both owned by Wellingborough Borough Council, however are operated on their behalf by Places for People. Waendel pool is currently in need of urgent repairs due to tiles coming away from the pool floor.

Wellingborough Phoenix is one of the United Kingdom's largest basketball clubs; the men's first team currently play in EBL Division 3 and the women play in EBL Division 2. Youth teams also play in the EBL; ages ranging from u13 to u16.

On the second weekend in May, the annual non-competitive Waendel Walk is held in Wellingborough, with a variety of routes through the local countryside. The walk is affiliated to the International Marching League.

The motorsport team RML Group is based in Wellingborough. They compete in BTCC and WTCC and formerly raced in ELMS and WRC.

== Services ==
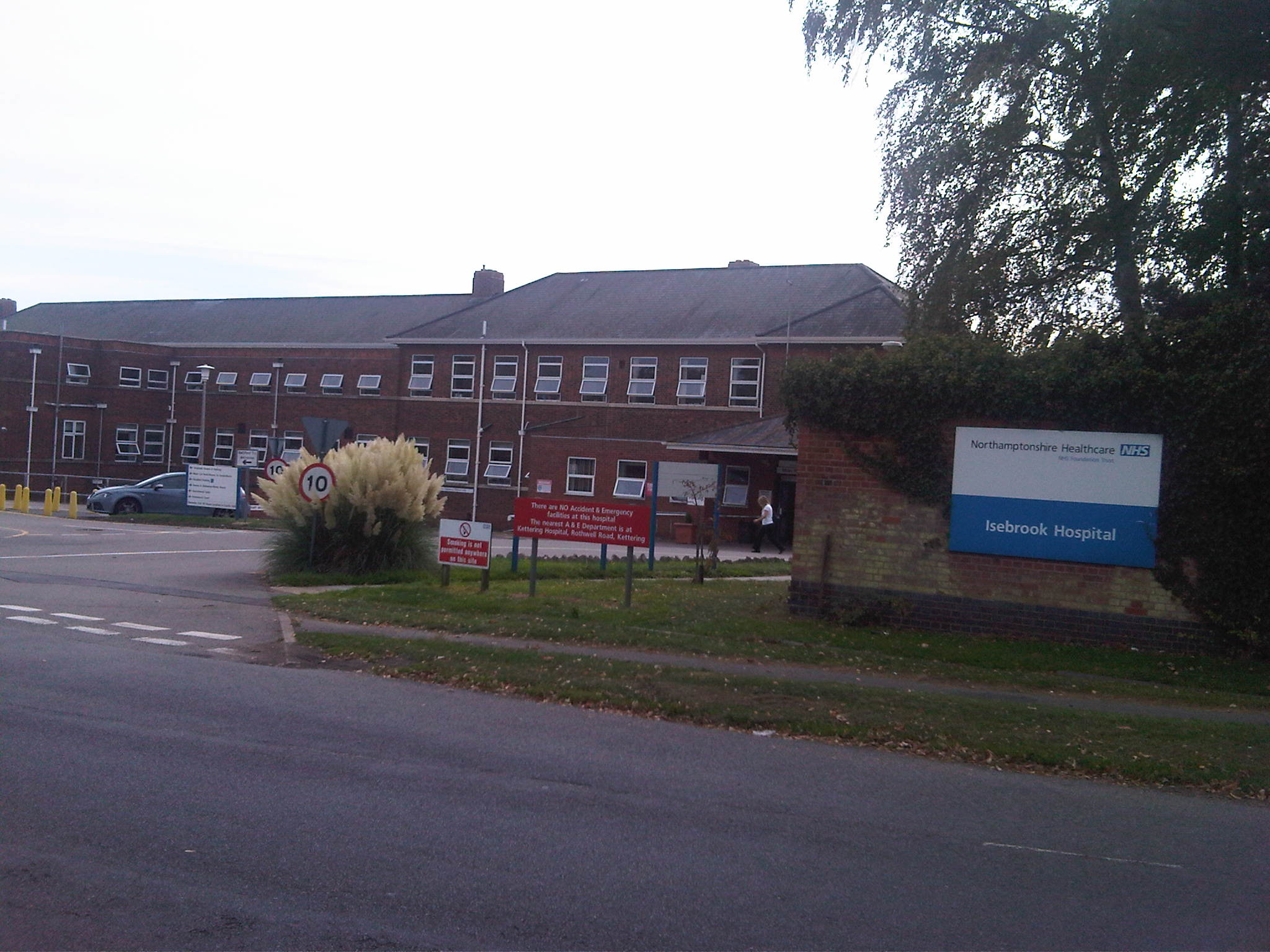
The entrance of Isebrook Hospital

Several NHS centres provide health care facilities, with Isebrook Hospital being equipped for procedures such as large X-Rays and neurological investigations, and long-term care, that are not catered for by primary care surgeries. Accident & Emergency (A&E), maternity, and surgical issues are mainly covered by Kettering General Hospital. The Air Ambulance is provided by Warwickshire and Northamptonshire Air Ambulance service. A petition signed by thousands of local residents in the towns of Wellingborough and Rushden for a new A&E to be built in Wellingborough was handed to 10 Downing Street (when Prime Minister Gordon Brown was in power), by local MP Peter Bone on 10 February 2010.

Five Wells Prison is based in Wellingborough.

== Landmarks ==
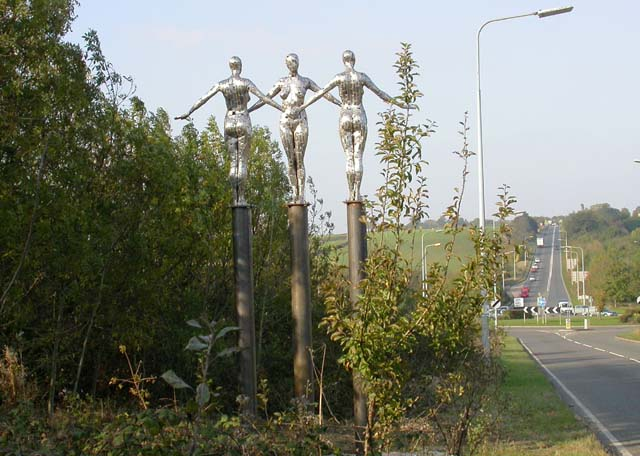
Sculpture: Three Silver Ladies

The railway station is a Grade II Listed building, and among the many unusual and other listed buildings in Wellingborough is the 600-year-old Grade I listed steeple that forms part of All Hallows Church.

The Three Silver Ladies is one of two identical sculptures installed on the Harrowden Road, They depict local Roman history, the river, and the townspeople working together.

To the west of the town centre is the Roman Catholic Our Lady of the Sacred Heart Church which according to Historic England has "highly original details," and a "lavishly finished interior."

== Notable people ==
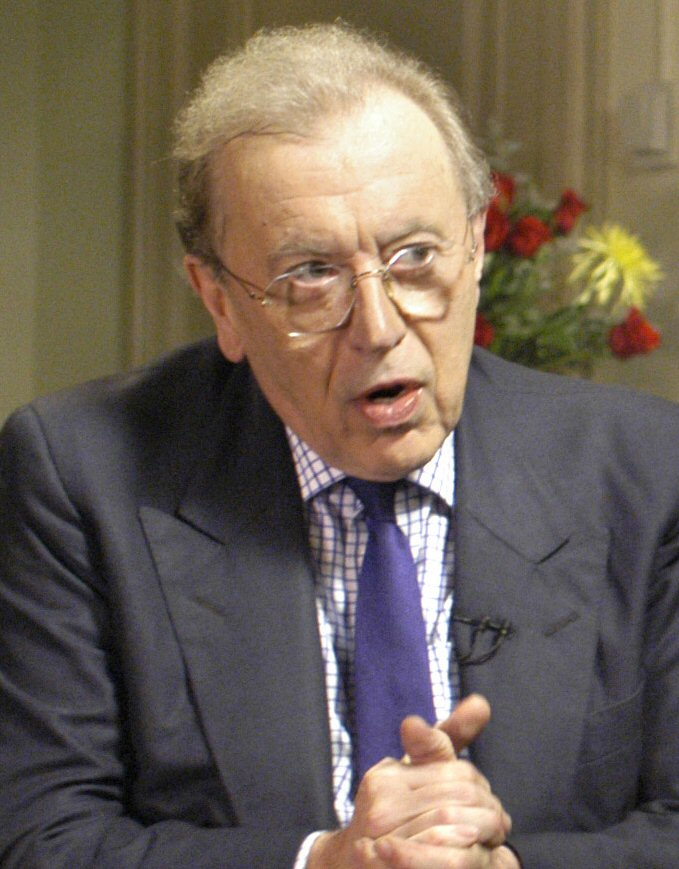
Sir David Frost attended Wellingborough Grammar School.

- Sir Paul Pindar (1565–1650), ambassador of King James I.
- William Bull (1738–1814), an English independent minister.
- John Clarke (1761–1815), physician and obstetrician.
- John Askham (1825–1894), a working class poet who published five volumes of poetry.
- Harry Crane Perrin (1865–1953), a cathedral organist at Canterbury Cathedral.
- Alfred Dobbs (1882–1945), politician and trade unionist.
- Kenneth Mees (1882–1960), scientist and photographic researcher.
- F. H. Gravely (1885–1965), an arachnologist.
- Arthur Allen (1887–1981), footwear manufacturer, trade union and politician.
- Mick Mannock, (1887–1918), RAF flying ace and Victoria Cross recipient.
- Sir David Frost (1939–2013), broadcaster
- Brian Binley (1942–2020), politician and local MP.
- Bruce Quarrie (1947–2004), writer and author on wargaming, lived locally.
- Stephen Elboz (born 1956), writer of children's books.
- Jim Murray (born 1957), writer, journalist and whisky critic.
- Peter Murphy (born 1957), lead vocalist of gothic rock band Bauhaus.
- Thom Yorke (born 1968), lead singer and songwriter of the rock band Radiohead.
- Tom Pursglove (born 1988), politician, grew up locally; junior minister and MP for Corby.
- Daniel Robert Middleton (born 1991), YouTuber and professional gamer, known as DanTDM.

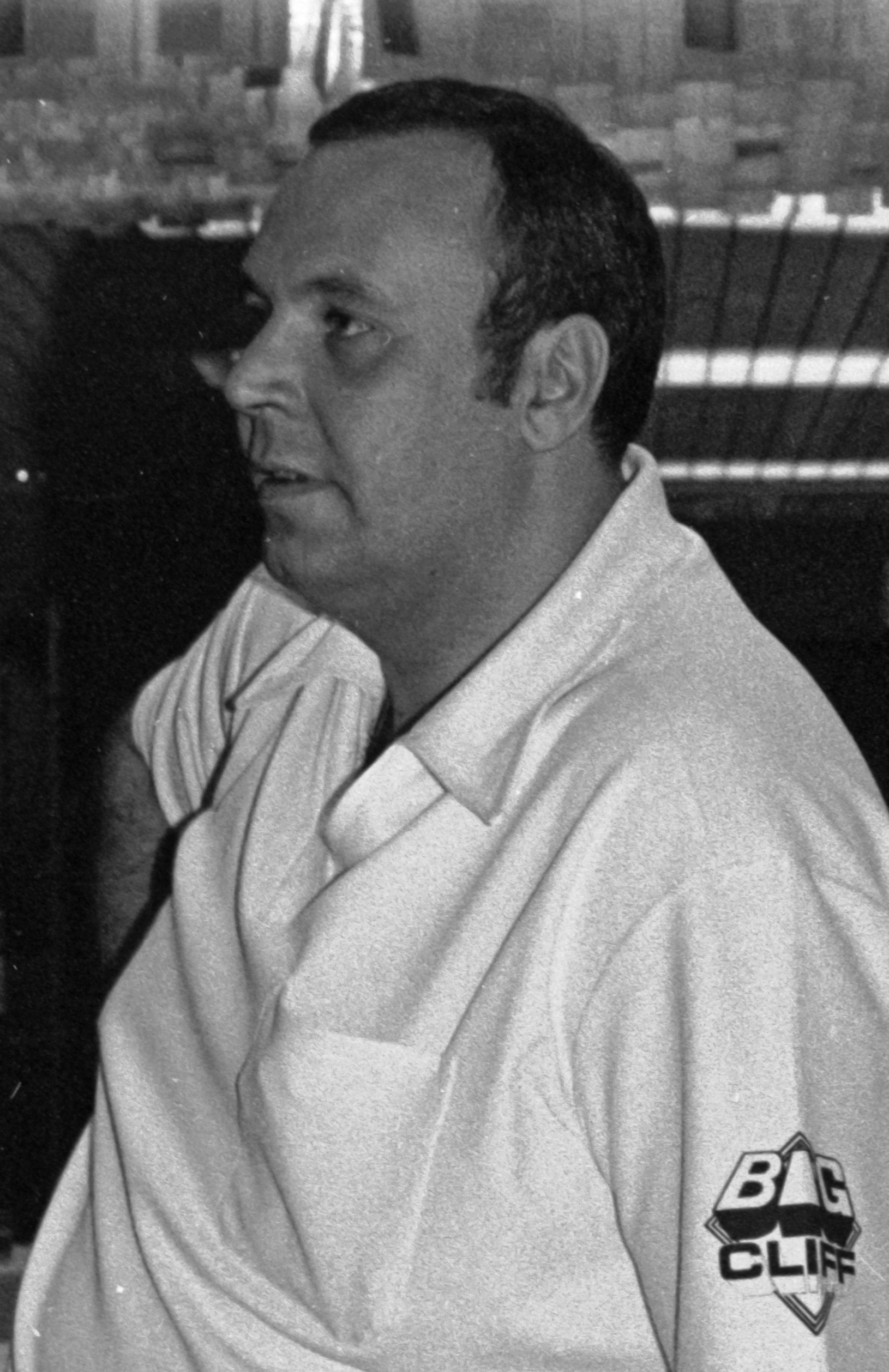
Cliff Lazarenko, 1985

=== Sport ===
- Bill Perkins (1876-ca 1940), football goalkeeper, played 208 games
- Fanny Walden (1888–1949), footballer, played 342 games
- Billy Brawn (1878–1932). footballer with over 300 professional games
- Jeff Butterfield (1929–2004), rugby player, played 28 games for England.
- Brian Hill (born 1947), football referee.
- Anita Neil (born 1950), first Black British female Olympian.
- Cliff Lazarenko (born 1952), darts player
- Marc Iliffe (1972–2003), strongman, died locally
- Peter Ebdon (born 1970), snooker player.
- Rory McLeod (born 1971), snooker player.
- Trevor Benjamin (born 1979), footballer, played 396 games

== Twin towns ==
Wellingborough is twinned with:

- Niort, France
- Wittlich, Germany

== See also ==
- Grade I listed buildings in Wellingborough (borough)
- Grade II* listed buildings in Wellingborough (borough)
