= Croyland Abbey, Wellingborough =

Croyland Abbey
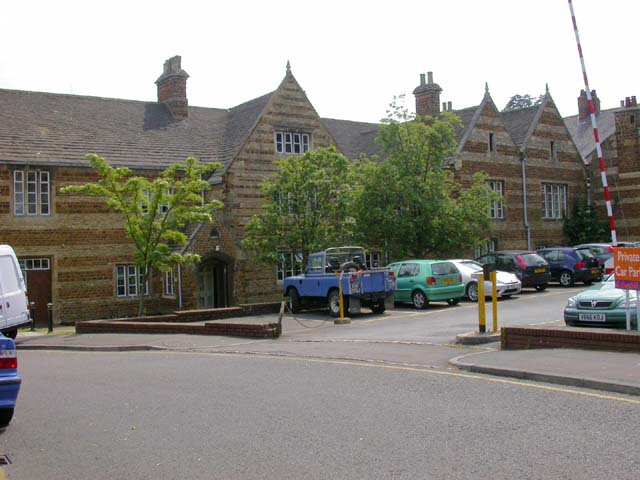

- Location within Northamptonshire

Location
- Coordinates: 52.3001°N 0.6935°W

Croyland Abbey is a Grade II-listed manor house (currently used as offices), in Wellingborough, Northamptonshire.

== History ==
The building was never an abbey. It is named after Croyland (or Crowland) Abbey in Lincolnshire, for which it was a monastic grange from the 10th century. Although there was never an Abbey here, there were monks here who lived and worshipped at the site. A Grade I tithe barn, dating to the 15th Century, is the only remaining building that was attached to the medieval grange. The ironstone barn survived a fire in 1972.

The present structure is Jacobean and was constructed in the 17th century. It has been heavily altered and rebuilt; with large parts of the 17th-century house demolished in the early 19th-century. However, traces of the medieval grange exist, in the form of a 12th-century doorway.

The Abbey adjoins Croyland Hall, originally a farmhouse, which was home to Wellingborough Heritage Centre until 2006. Renamed Wellingborough Museum, it relocated to the building that used to be Dulleys swimming baths in Castle Way, with the help of the Heritage Lottery Fund.

Both Croyland Hall and Croyland Abbey are now occupied as offices by Wellingborough Borough Council. There is a Cleric with the Title Abbot of Croyland.
