= 2011 Wellingborough Borough Council election =

2011 UK local government election

- 5 May 2011

All 36 seats in the Wellingborough Borough Council 19 seats needed for a majority
	First party	Second party
Party	Conservative	Labour
Last election	30	4
Seats won	27	9
Seat change	▼3	▲5
Popular vote	13,551	9,945
Percentage	46.4%	29.7%
- Map showing the results of the 2011 Wellingborough Borough Council elections.
Council control before election
Conservative
Council control after election
Conservative

The 2011 Borough Council of Wellingborough election took place on 5 May 2011 to elect members of Borough Council of Wellingborough in Northamptonshire, UK. This was on the same day as other local elections.
