= 2015 Wellingborough Borough Council election =

2015 UK local government election

- 7 May 2015

All 36 seats in the Wellingborough Borough Council 19 seats needed for a majority
	First party	Second party
Party	Conservative	Labour
Last election	27	9
Seats won	27	9
Seat change	Steady	Steady
Popular vote	18,375	11,766
Percentage	46.4%	29.7%
- Map showing the results of the 2015 Wellingborough Borough Council elections.
Council control before election
Conservative
Council control after election
Conservative

The 2015 Borough Council of Wellingborough election took place on 7 May 2015 to elect members of Borough Council of Wellingborough in Northamptonshire, UK. This was on the same day as other local elections.
