= Orlingbury =

Village in Northamptonshire, England

Coordinates: 52.3394°N 0.7339°W

- Location within Northamptonshire
- Population: 439 (2011 census)
- OS grid reference: SP8672
- Unitary authority: North Northamptonshire
- Ceremonial county: Northamptonshire
- Region: East Midlands
- Country: England
- Sovereign state: United Kingdom
- Post town: Kettering
- Postcode district: NN14
- Dialling code: 01933
- Police: Northamptonshire
- Fire: Northamptonshire
- Ambulance: East Midlands
- UK Parliament: Wellingborough

Orlingbury is a village and civil parish in the English county of Northamptonshire. It is between the towns of Kettering and Wellingborough. Administratively it forms part of North Northamptonshire but was in the borough of Wellingborough until 2021. At the time of the 2011 census, the parish's population was 439 people.

The villages name origin is uncertain. 'Grove', 'woodland swine-pasture', 'hill' or 'fortification' connected with Ordla'. The hundred takes its name from Orlingbury. The site of the meeting-place is unknown. The west part of Orlingbury hundred was Mawsley hundred.

== Notable buildings ==
The Historic England website contains details of a total of 16 listed buildings in the parish of Orlingbury. Those which are Grade II* are:

- St Mary's Church, The Green Orlingbury is part of a united Benefice along with Great Harrowden, Little Harrowden, Isham and Pytchley.
- Orlingbury Hall, The Green
- The Old Rectory, Rectory Lane
- Gatepier approximately 45 metres north east of the Old Rectory, Rectory Lane

The Village Hall can be found at Rectory Lane and The Queen's Arms public house at Isham Road.

== Wythmail ==
The site of the deserted village of Wythmail is in the parish of Orlingbury.

== Cricket ground ==
On the outskirts of Orlingbury is a cricket ground, home of Isham Cricket Club who play in Division 1 of The Northamptonshire County League. Past players have included Stephen Fleming (New Zealand national cricket team Captain), Johann Myburgh (SA Titans) and John Hughes (Northamptonshire County Cricket Club).

According to local folklore, the man who killed the last wolf in England is buried in the church. He is known locally as Jock of Badsaddle.
