= Redhill Grange =

Area of Wellingborough, Northamptonshire, England

Coordinates: 52.322317°N 0.70454657°W

- Location within Northamptonshire
- OS grid reference: SP8839170147
- Unitary authority: North Northamptonshire
- Ceremonial county: Northamptonshire
- Region: East Midlands
- Country: England
- Sovereign state: United Kingdom
- Post town: WELLINGBOROUGH
- Postcode district: NN9
- Police: Northamptonshire
- Fire: Northamptonshire
- Ambulance: East Midlands
- UK Parliament: Wellingborough

Redhill Grange is a suburb of Wellingborough, Northamptonshire. Colloquially referred to as Redhill, the area is situated just north of the town's Redwell area, 10 miles from Northampton.

== History ==
Redhill Grange is a small private housing area of just under 400 homes, located approximately a mile and a half north of the centre of Wellingborough. The site is predominantly surrounded by farmed land, although there are also adjacent areas of woodland and hedgerows. The Great Harrowden Brook runs along the southern edge of the side whilst to the east there is an area of farmland followed by the Finedon Road industrial estate.

Redhill Grange was slowly developed over the period between the late 1960s and the late 1990s by a number of different developers and properties range from two bedroom semi-detached to five bedroom detached houses

However, in 2006 a speculative property development was announced by Bee Bee Developments which planned for the construction of some 4,000 homes, and which included the building of two local centres with office space, retail units, a 50-room hotel and retail units surrounding Redhill Grange.

In November 2006 the residents of Redhill Grange formed the Redhill Grange Community Association to respond to Bee Bee Developments proposals and provide a platform for residents to voice their concerns.

In November 2007 Bee Bee Developments submitted a planning application to the Wellingborough Borough Council ( Application WP2007/7050) for the construction of Upper Redhill, a development of 3,000 homes which would surround Redhill Grange. At 4 February 2009 Extraordinary Meeting of the Borough Council of Wellingborough, councillors voted by 18 votes to 7 votes to refuse the Upper Redhill planning application submitted by North Northants LLP (Bee Bee Developments).

Subsequently the Developers lodged an appeal and in June 2009 a Public Inquiry was held. Following this Inquiry the then Secretary of State for Communities and Local Government granted the Developers outline planning permission in February 2010.

== Amenities ==
A small shopping unit exists in the adjacent Redhill Farm estate with a Co-operative Group supermarket, several takeaway shops, an automotive parts store, bicycle repair store and a children's nursery. The 'ock n Dough was the only public house in the community, owned by Greene King Breweries, until recently when a new ale house opened called Ale Hub opposite.

== Transport ==
Road

Redhill Grange is located on east of the A509 road which links Kettering with Wellingborough, and is to the north of the northern ring road Northern Way and Niort Way (A510 road), accessible from the A45 road.

Bus

Connect Wellingborough W6 buses formerly linked the area to the town centre, with the route 24 previously linking the area to Kettering. The Stagecoach Midlands X4 bus service can be caught from Harrowden Road, connecting the area to central Wellingborough, Kettering, Northampton and Peterborough.

Train

Wellingborough railway station is three miles away from the area to the south east. East Midlands Railway operate direct trains to London St Pancras, departing every 30 mins, with an average journey time of 55 mins. The railway line also connects Wellingborough with Bedford, Luton, Kettering, Corby, Leicester, Nottingham, Derby, Sheffield and Leeds.

== See also ==
- Wellingborough
