= 2007 Wellingborough Borough Council election =

2007 UK local government election

- 3 May 2007

All 36 seats in the Wellingborough Borough Council 19 seats needed for a majority
	First party	Second party
Party	Conservative	Labour
Last election	27	9
Seats won	30	4
Seat change	▲3	▼5
Popular vote	12,190	8,188
Percentage	52.7%	35.4%
- Map showing the results of the 2007 Wellingborough Borough Council elections.
Council control before election
Conservative
Council control after election
Conservative

The 2007 Borough Council of Wellingborough election took place on 3 May 2007 to elect members of Borough Council of Wellingborough in Northamptonshire, UK. This was on the same day as other local elections. The Conservatives won 30 seats with 12,190 votes, while Labour won 4 seats with 8,188 votes.
