= British Society of Master Glass Painters =

British trade association for the art and craft of stained glass

The British Society of Master Glass Painters (BSMGP) is a British trade association for the art and craft of stained glass. Founded in 1921, it is a membership organisation which exists to represent the trade of glass painting and staining in Britain. The founding subscribers included John Hardman, Walter Tower (Kempe & Co), Arthur Powell (James Powell and Sons) and Thomas Grylls (Burlison & Grylls) and Percy Bacon.

BSMGP activities include: lectures, conferences, exhibitions, forums, and guided walks. It also offers publications such as an annual journal and a quarterly newsletter. Additionally, it houses an extensive reference library, available to its members only.

The current president is Prince Richard, Duke of Gloucester.

== See also ==
- Worshipful Company of Glaziers and Painters of Glass
