= Great Harrowden =

Village in Northamptonshire, England

Coordinates: 52.329°N 0.710°W

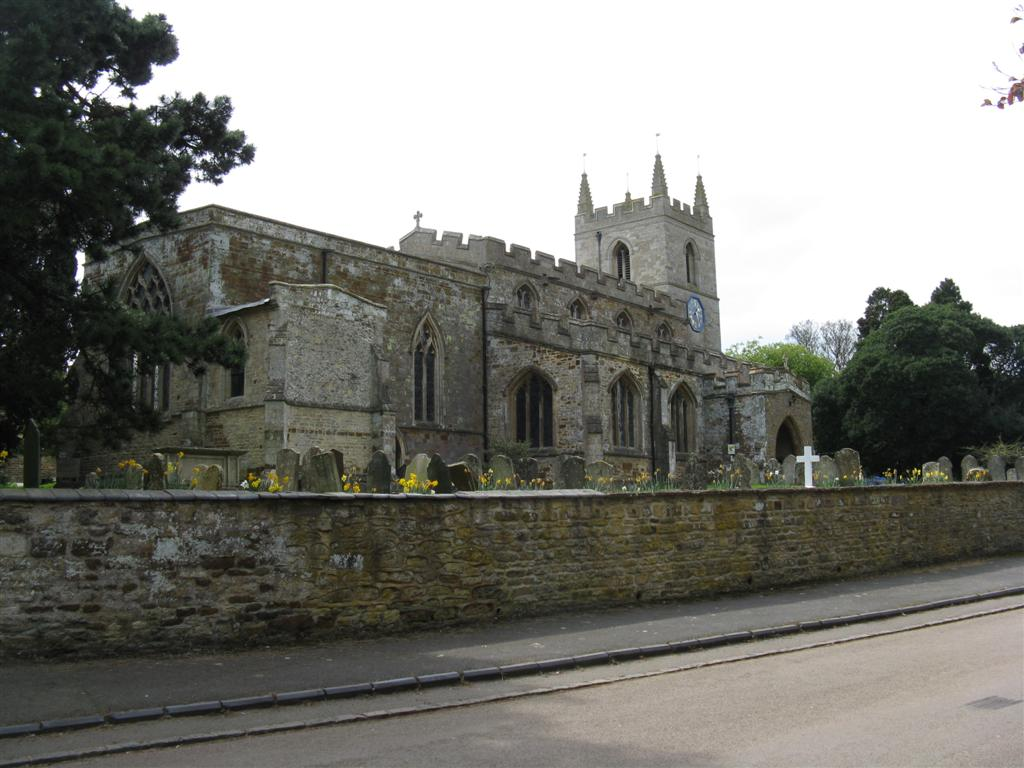
- All Saints' Church, Great Harrowden

- Location within Northamptonshire
- Population: 161 (2011 census)
- OS grid reference: SP879708
- Unitary authority: North Northamptonshire
- Ceremonial county: Northamptonshire
- Region: East Midlands
- Country: England
- Sovereign state: United Kingdom
- Post town: WELLINGBOROUGH
- Postcode district: NN9
- Dialling code: 01933
- Police: Northamptonshire
- Fire: Northamptonshire
- Ambulance: East Midlands
- UK Parliament: Wellingborough

Great Harrowden is a village and civil parish in North Northamptonshire, with a population (including Hardwick) at the 2011 census of 161. The village is located near the A509 road running between Kettering and Wellingborough. The village formed part of the Orlingbury hundred and the Borough of Wellingborough. Since 2021 it has been within North Northamptonshire unitary authority.

The village's name means 'heathen temple hill' from the Old English hearg.

Nearby settlements include Little Harrowden, Isham and Finedon.

== Church ==
The Church of England parish church of All Saints dates back to Norman times and is a Grade II* listed building. It is famous for its medieval Doom painting above the chancel arch. The painting is not sophisticated but is considered to be one of the best and most complete Dooms remaining in England.

The church is mainly made of ironstone apart from the tower, which is ashlar. The tower was rebuilt in 1822; there was formerly a spire, but this collapsed in the 18th century.

The church contains some 17th-century plate (cup: 1695; paten: 1698) and a brass to William Harrowden.

== Great Harrowden Hall ==
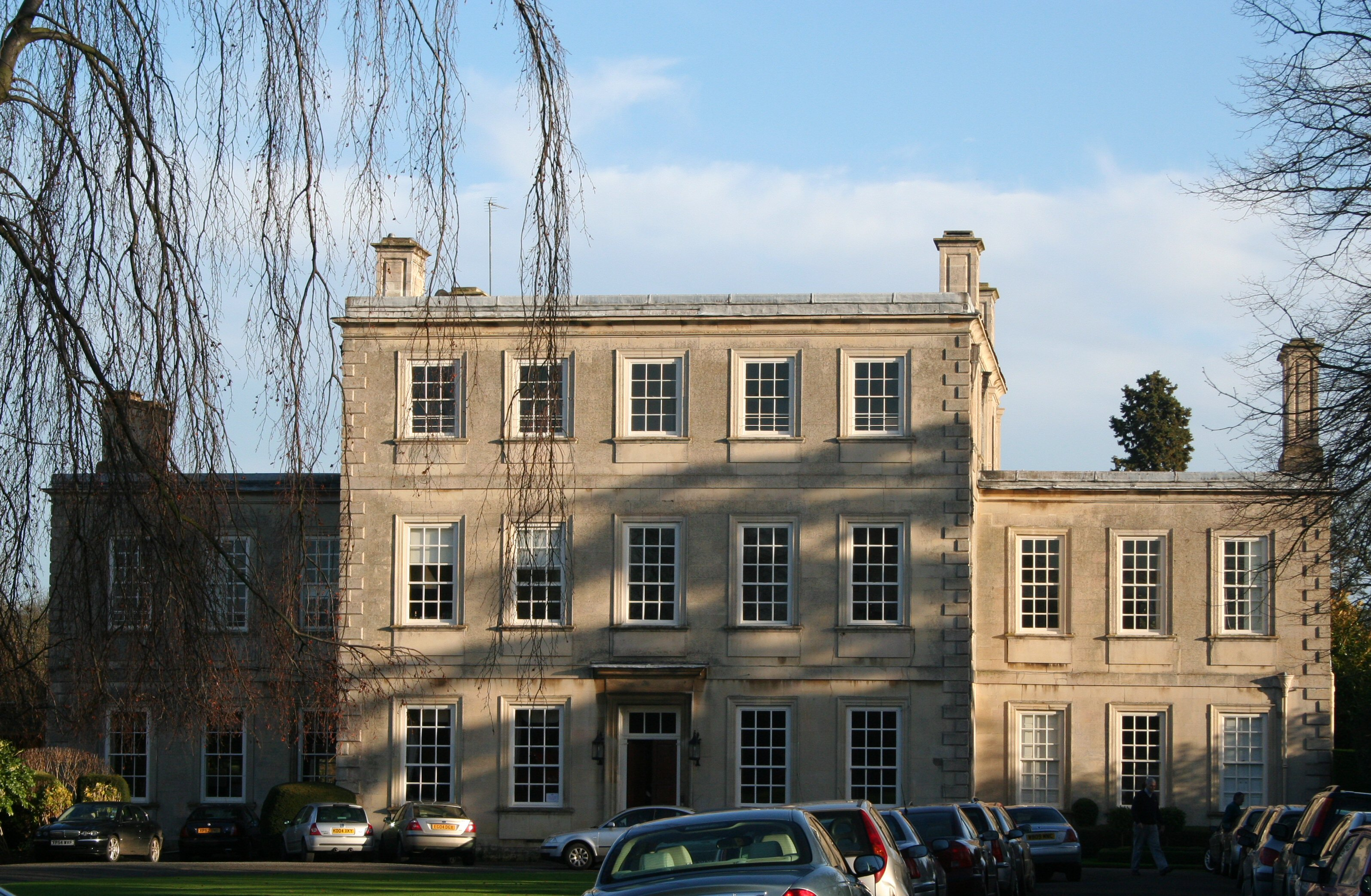
Great Harrowden Hall

In the 15th century the manors of Great and Little Harrowden were held by Sir William Vaux, killed at the Battle of Tewkesbury in 1471. There has been a house on the site since then, which Henry VIII and James I are both known to have visited. The Vaux family were created barons by Henry VIII in 1523. On the death of the fifth Lord Vaux in 1662 the title fell into abeyance and the estates were inherited by Nicholas Knollys, who was still claiming the title Earl of Banbury when he died in 1674.

Thomas Watson-Wentworth bought the estate from the Knollys family in 1695 and built the present Hall between 1716 and 1719 for use as a Dower House. His son Thomas Wentworth (died 1750) who had become the 6th Lord Rockingham, was created Marquess of Rockingham in 1746. In 1782 Harrowden was inherited by William, Earl Fitzwilliam of Milton, and it descended in the Fitzwilliam family. Towards the end of the nineteenth century it housed a small girls’ boarding school; the Hawaiian princess, Victoria Kaiulani was educated there between 1889 and 1892. In 1895 it was sold to the seventh Lord Vaux, a descendant of the earlier owners.

In 1975 the hall was acquired by Wellingborough Golf Club to be its new clubhouse after it had been rescued from demolition by A. James Macdonald-Buchanan, High Sheriff of Northamptonshire for 1972. An 18-hole championship golf course has been created in the park.

The Hall is Grade I listed and contains a landscape park of about 160 acres (650,000 m^{2}) to the north and east of the hall. In addition to the golf course, the park contains some unaltered early formal gardens, surrounded by brick walls and fine iron gates with several statues by the Dutch sculptor John van Nost. The grounds also contain a chapel built by the 7th Baron Vaux in 1905 – being a copy of the school at Higham Ferrers and three groups of lead statuary.

== Gallery ==
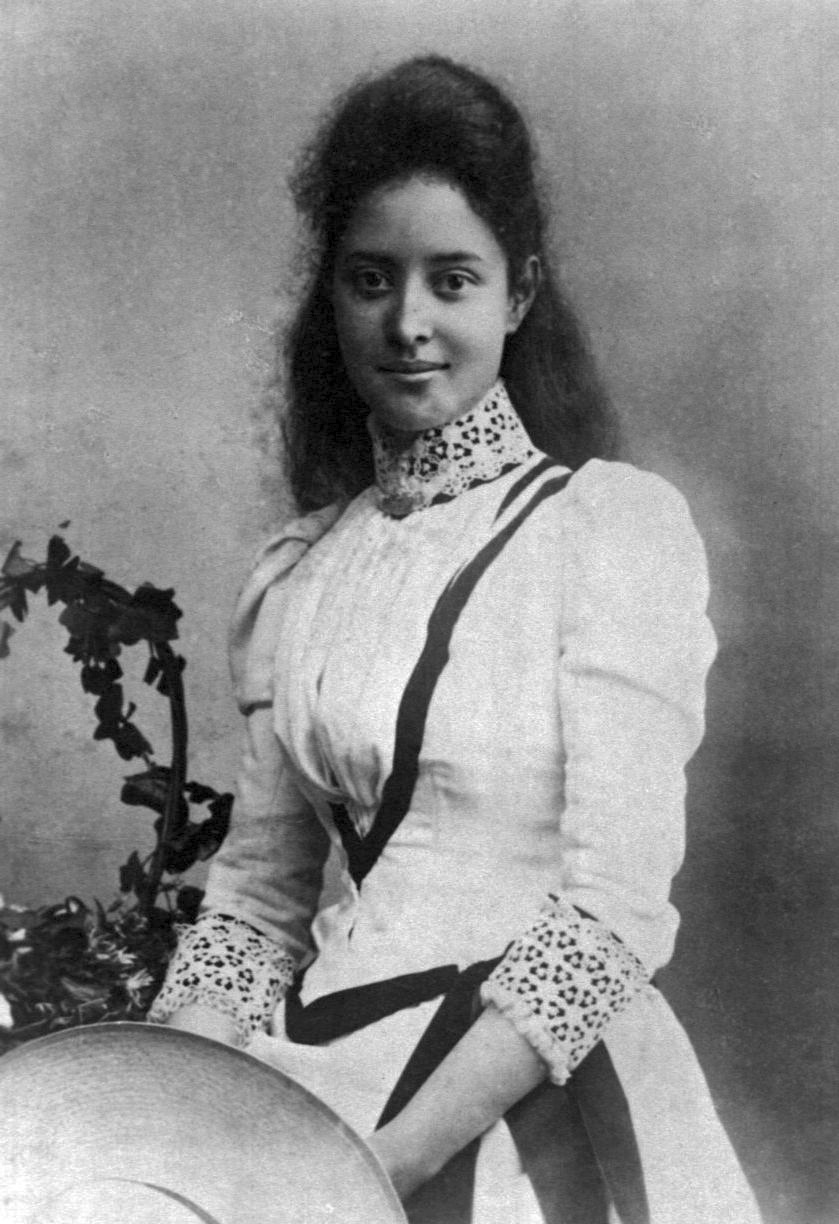
Princess Victoria Kaiulani, heir to the Hawaiian throne, educated at Great Harrowden Hall

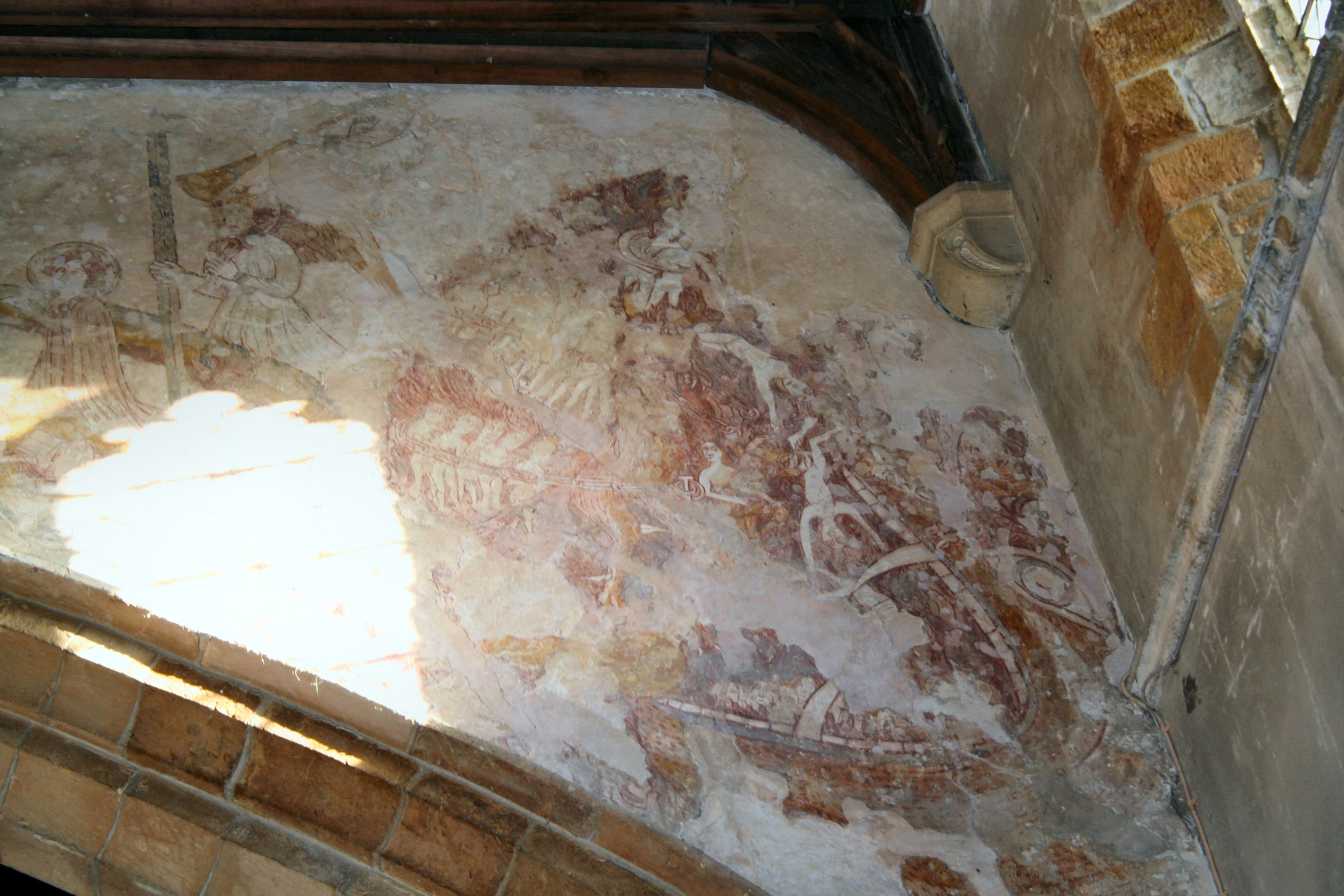
The medieval doom picture in All Saints' Church
