= 2003 Wellingborough Borough Council election =

2003 UK local government election

- 1 May 2003

All 36 seats in the Wellingborough Borough Council 19 seats needed for a majority
	First party	Second party
Party	Conservative	Labour
Last election	15	20
Seats won	27	9
Seat change	▲12	▼11
Popular vote	11,906	7,352
Percentage	56.4%	34.8%
- Map showing the results of the 2003 Wellingborough Borough Council elections.
Council control before election
Labour
Council control after election
Conservative

The 2003 Borough Council of Wellingborough election took place on 1 May 2003 to elect members of Borough Council of Wellingborough in Northamptonshire, England. This was on the same day as other local elections.
