= Ecton, Northamptonshire =

Village in Northamptonshire, England

Coordinates: 52.265°N 0.787°W

Ecton
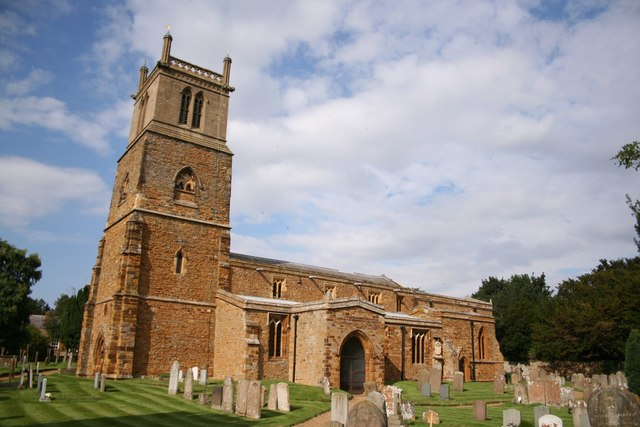
- Parish Church of St. Mary Magdalene

- Location within Northamptonshire
- Population: 466 (2011 census)
- OS grid reference: SP827637
- Civil parish: Ecton
- Unitary authority: North Northamptonshire
- Ceremonial county: Northamptonshire
- Region: East Midlands
- Country: England
- Sovereign state: United Kingdom
- Post town: Northampton
- Postcode district: NN6
- Dialling code: 01604
- Police: Northamptonshire
- Fire: Northamptonshire
- Ambulance: East Midlands
- UK Parliament: Daventry
- Website: Ecton Village

Ecton is a village and civil parish in North Northamptonshire, England. The village is just east of Northampton, just off the A4500 road. It was one of the first villages in Northamptonshire to be given conservation status. The toponym is derived from the Old English words Ecca and tun, meaning "Ecca's farm/settlement."

== Demographics ==
The 2011 census recorded 466 people living in the village: 231 male, 235 female, in 211 households.

== American links ==
Ecton is a place of pilgrimage for many Americans. Benjamin Franklin's ancestors lived here for over 300 years, many generations of them being the village blacksmiths, on a site where now stands the Three Horseshoes Inn. There are still headstones for members of the Franklin family in the village churchyard; inside the church there is a bronze plaque, provided by a group of American visitors in 1910, which has a quotation from one of Benjamin Franklin's speeches.

== Transport ==
Ecton is served by the A4500 which runs east–west past the top of the village. The road connects Ecton to Northampton and Wellingborough, as well as a number of other villages. To the south of the village is the A45. There are no public transport services that run through the village itself, although Stagecoach United Counties provides regular bus services that stop on the A4500. Bus services run from early morning to late evening with a reduced service on Sundays and Bank Holidays.

== Religion ==
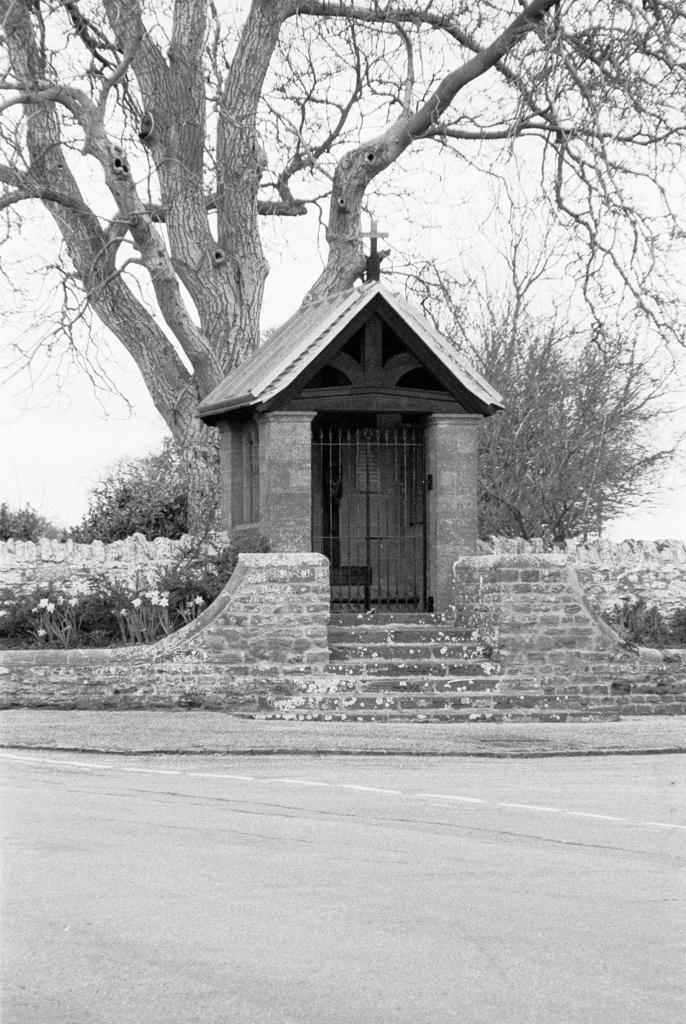
The Shrine

The Church of England parish church of Saint Mary Magdalene is just off the High Street. It dates from the 13th century. Graves of the Sotheby family of Ecton Hall and the Franklin family are in the churchyard. The stained glass in the east window of St Mary Magdalene's Church is dedicated to the memory of Major General Frederick Edward Sotheby of Ecton Hall. It depicts The offering of King David at the Cave of Adullam, and was executed in 1912 by Percy Bacon & Brothers.

The church is in the Diocese of Peterborough.

Two former chapels, one off the High Street and the other in West Street, have been converted to residential properties.

From about 1687 to 1703 Henry Bagley ran a bell foundry in Ecton. Bagley is buried in the parish churchyard. The Bagley family also ran a bell-foundry in Chacombe.

== Public houses ==
Ecton has two public houses: The World's End which was refurbished and extended in 2006, and The Three Horseshoes, also refurbished in April 2011. The World's End is at the edge of the village on the A4500, and The Three Horseshoes is in the centre of the village. The Three Horseshoes offers traditional pub games including skittles, darts and cribbage.

== Shops ==
Ecton no longer has any shops. In the past the village had a post office and numerous shops but the last post office and shop closed in 1989. The village has also been home to many different trades, including a baker, blacksmith, tailor and a bell foundry. There are many self-employed people operating in the village offering services such as hairdressing, building, and odd-job persons.

== School ==
The village primary school educates children up to the age of 11 from the village and surrounding area.

== Recreation ==
The village has a playing field which is adjacent to The World's End pub and The Shrine which has swings, a roundabout, slide and climbing equipment for young children. The village cricket club plays on a pitch located behind the village club. The pitch used to be located in a field off the A4500 until the mid-1990s when it moved to its current location.

== See also ==
- Northampton
- Wellingborough
- Earls Barton
- Sywell
- Overstone
- Mears Ashby
- Cogenhoe
- Whiston
- Wilby
- Great Doddington
