= 1999 Wellingborough Borough Council election =

1999 UK local government election

- 6 May 1999

All 36 seats in the Wellingborough Borough Council 19 seats needed for a majority
	First party	Second party
Party	Labour	Conservative
Seats won	20	15
- Map showing the results of the 1999 Wellingborough Borough Council elections.
Council control before election
No Overall Control
Council control after election
Labour

The 1999 Borough Council of Wellingborough election took place on 6 May 1999 to elect members of Borough Council of Wellingborough in Northamptonshire, UK. This was on the same day as other local elections.

The result was significant as it went against the national swing as Wellingborough was the only council Labour gained in the 1999 elections.
