= Percy Bacon Brothers =

Firm which produced stained glass

Percy Bacon & Brothers
- Industry: Stained glass
- Founded: 1892; 134 years ago at 11 Newman Street, London, United Kingdom
- Founder: Percy Charles Haydon Bacon
- Defunct: 1930s
- Headquarters: United Kingdom
- Area served: United Kingdom; Australia; Canada; United States

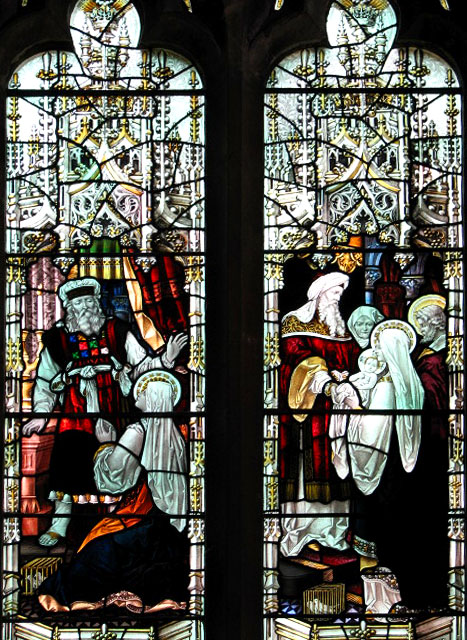
Window from St Mary's Church, North Creake, Norfolk

Percy Bacon and Brothers was a firm which produced stained glass, church furnishings, and decorations. The firm was set up in 1892 by stained glass artist and sculptor, Percy Charles Haydon Bacon, and operated for many years from 11 Newman Street, London. He was joined there by his brothers, Herbert W. Bacon, and Archibald Arthur Bacon. The vast majority of the firm's output of stained glass was installed in Great Britain, with a few examples in Northern Ireland and the Republic of Ireland, but their work can also be found in the United States of America, Australia, New Zealand, and Canada.

== History ==
Percy Charles Haydon Bacon was born in Ipswich on 23 December 1860, the son of a boot closer, Joshua Bacon and his wife, Elizabeth. When his father died in 1881, his family moved to 65 Charlotte Street, London. Here Percy Bacon began work as a stained glass artist, designing windows for James Powell & Sons, such as the east window of Tempo Church, Fermanagh, and the reredos at Yarcombe, Devon, among others. Between 1892 and 1923 the business operated from a studio at 11, Newman Street, London, but in 1923 moved to 4, Endsleigh Gardens, London. In its early years the firm enjoyed a good deal of success, being commissioned to design and execute stained glass windows in Manchester Cathedral (1892), and Newcastle-upon-Tyne Cathedral (1895).

The firm worked closely with architect George Fellowes Prynne, who wrote; "[Percy Bacon's] glass and painting is, I consider, second to none, and as in the carrying out he works entirely in harmony with my wishes, and in close conjunction with me as the work proceeds, I feel entirely confident of completely satisfactory results". Many commissions also came from the Reverend Architect Ernest Geldart with whom the firm worked from at least 1894.

In April 1917 the firm of Percy Bacon and Brothers Limited went into voluntary liquidation, as a result of financial problems. Shortly afterward, on 6 June 1917, Percy Bacon registered a new company, "Percy Bacon Limited", operating from 11, Newman Street, London. This would be the name under which the firm operated until its final closure in 1932.

In 1921 Percy C. H. Bacon was one of the founding subscribers to, and member of the British Society of Master Glass Painters with, amongst others, his contemporaries John Hardman, Walter Tower (Kempe & Co), Arther Powell (J Powell & Sons) and Thomas Grylls (Burlison & Grylls).

In around 1930 the firm seems to have moved to premises in Reading, Berkshire, though no records have come to light which confirm this, with the exception of one window, installed by the firm in 1930 in St Matthew's Church, Ipswich, which bears the signature "PERCY BACON READING". Percy Bacon died on 2 January 1935 at a nursing home in Reading.

== Windows ==
The windows of Percy Bacon Brothers were inspired by those of the 15th century, with the central figures generally framed by architectonic canopies of Late Gothic or Early Northern Renaissance form. The windows are opulent in style, generally depicting Biblical and historical figures of the Church richly attired in heavy robes, often decorated at the borders with pearls. The lower section of the window often contains a scroll bearing the relevant inscription, and supported by two angels. Output of the firm in the early years of the First World War had declined considerably, but following the firms liquidation in April 1917 and restart under its new name in June of that year, the firm was called upon to produce a great many memorial windows. These often depict heroic subjects, the Archangel Michael and St George, and virtues of Victory, Valour, Courage and Fortitude.

Among the characteristics of the glass of this firm is that the flesh is of translucent off-white glass that may be fawn or greenish in hue and relies on very detailed painting and stippled shading to achieve effect. The hair is often stained yellow with silver nitrate. The canopies are rarely coloured glass, but employ linear painting and shading, and have elements picked out with silver stain. The robes employ intensely coloured glass, often flashed, and sometimes etched to achieve elaborate patterns. There are often borders on the robes that are elaborately painted to resemble pearls and facetted jewels. The drawing of the figures displays a typical Late 19th-century academic approach.

== Examples ==
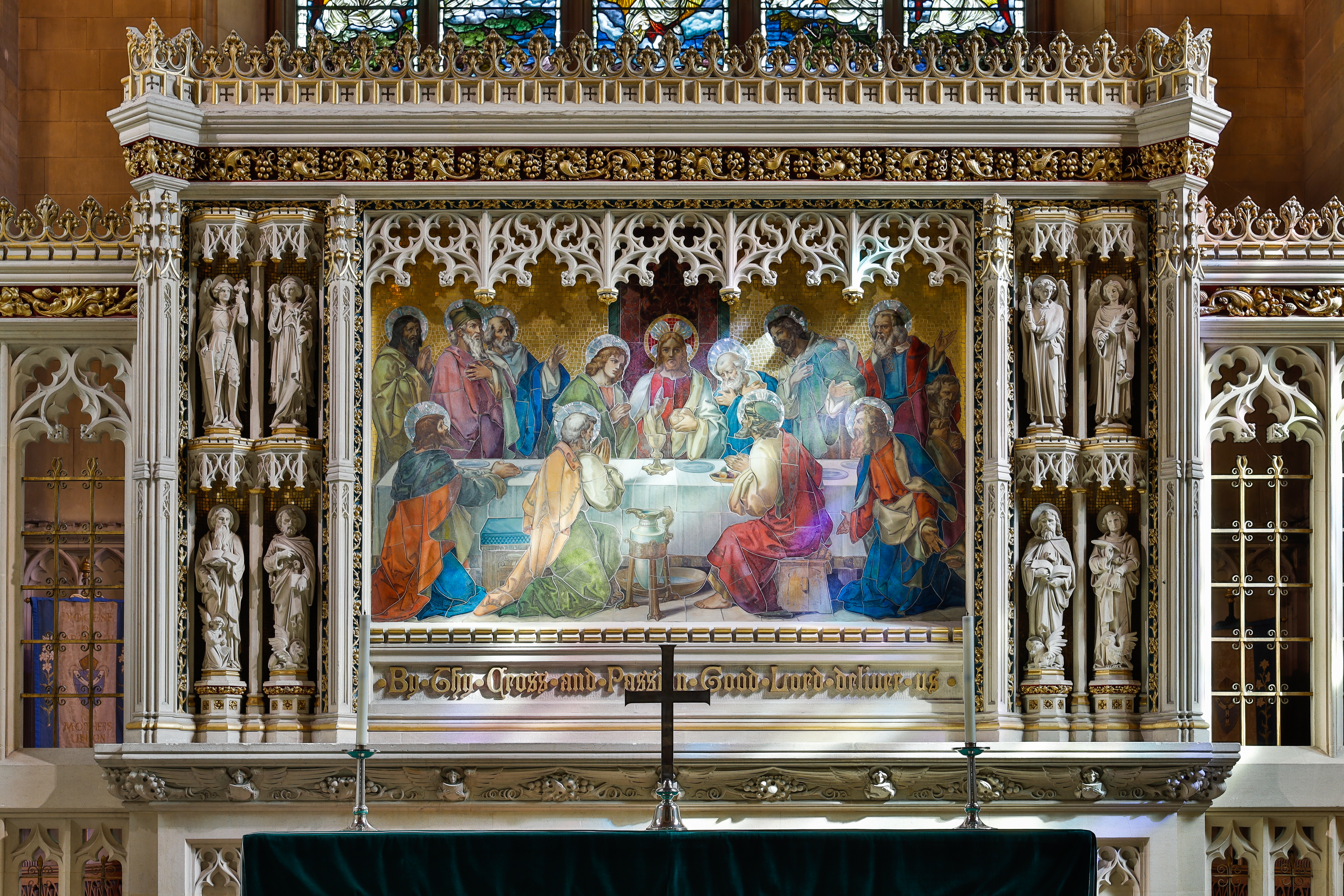
Last Supper as panel of painted ceramic, created for a reredos in St Patrick's Cathedral in Armagh that was designed by George Fellowes Prynne and installed in 1913

- Corpus of Percy Bacon: Manchester Cathedral, 1892. A large 6-light window in the bapistery representing baptism by blood, water, and fire, illustrated by the martyrdom of St Stephen. The window was destroyed in December 1940 during a bombing raid by the German Luftwaffe.
- St Mary Magdalene, Ecton, Northamptonshire, 1912; East window. The Offering of King David at the Cave of Adullam.
- St James' Church, Sydney, large Georgian windows, each with a single saint, without canopies and set against plain quarries, to suit the style of the church.
- Chapel of the Cross (Chapel Hill, North Carolina) 1925, Above the altar, triple East window of the Crucifixion with red-winged seraphim, St Mary and St John flanked on the left by St Peter preaching ("God is no respecter of persons") and on the right St Paul preaching (the altar "to the unknown god"). Large traceried West window of the Incarnation including Nativity, shepherds, kings, and surmounted above lights of the Law (Moses) and the (four Major) Prophets. Windows fully exhibit characteristics described in the text above, including rich canopy work and jewelled robes.
- St Andrew's Church, Boscombe, Dorset. All stained glass windows except the memorial window in the south nave were executed by Percy Bacon & Brothers.

== List of works ==
=== Australia ===
- St James' Church, Sydney, New South Wales

=== England ===
- St Andrew's Church, Boscombe, Dorset
- Manchester Cathedral, Manchester, Greater Manchester
- St Nicholas' Church, Brandiston, Norfolk
- Church of St Mary Magdalene, Ecton, Northamptonshire

=== United States ===
- Chapel of the Cross, Chapel Hill, North Carolina

== See also ==
- British and Irish stained glass (1811–1918)
