= Lok'nStore =

Provider of self storage space in the UK

Lok'nStore Group PLC
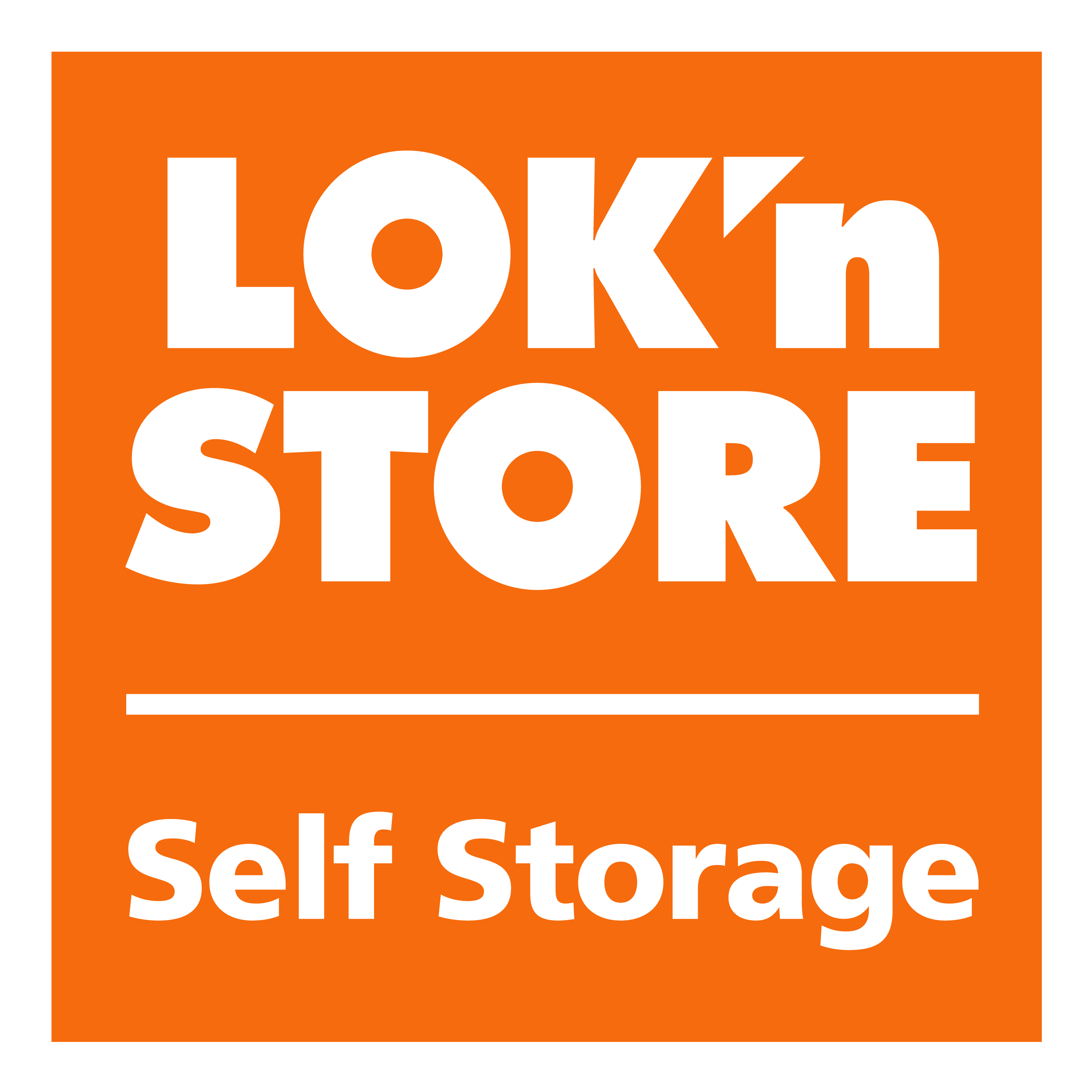
- Lok'nStore Logo
- Company type: Public
- Traded as: LSE: LOK
- Industry: Storage
- Founded: 1995
- Defunct: 1 August 2024; 22 months ago
- Headquarters: Farnborough, Hampshire, UK
- Number of locations: 43 (March 2024)
- Key people: Andrew Jacobs (Chair), Ray Davies (Finance Director), Neil Newman (Managing Director), Tom Lampard (Property Director)
- Revenue: ▲£25.3 million. Up 12.1% (2022: £22.5 million)
- Number of employees: 200+ (2024)
- Website: www.loknstore.co.uk

Lok'nStore Group PLC was a provider of self storage space in the UK. The company rented individual, storage units to both business and domestic / household customers. Lok'nStore was listed on the Alternative Investment Market (AIM) since June 2000.

== History ==
Lok'nStore was founded in February 1995 from one freehold store in Horsham, by Andrew Jacobs. Five years later, in May 2000, the business became a public company known as Lok'NStore Group PLC.

In 2003, the company received a takeover approach valued at around £33m, which was rejected by the Board. The company received a further takeover approach in 2009, which also did not proceed.

In December 2018, the company purchased the existing storage business 'The Box Room' in Hedge End, Southampton. The Box Room building was then rebranded as an orange Lok'nStore centre.

In February 2019, Lok'nStore Group PLC sold a document-storage business, Saracen Datastore Ltd, to Iron Mountain UK PLC for £7.6 million in order to pay down debt and help fund future acquisition and development plans.

In August 2024, Lok'nStore was acquired by Shurgard at a price of £11.10 per share, representing a total equity value of £378,000,000 and a total all-in cost of £613,000,000.
