= Wilby, Northamptonshire =

Coordinates: 52.2898°N 0.7332°W

Wilby
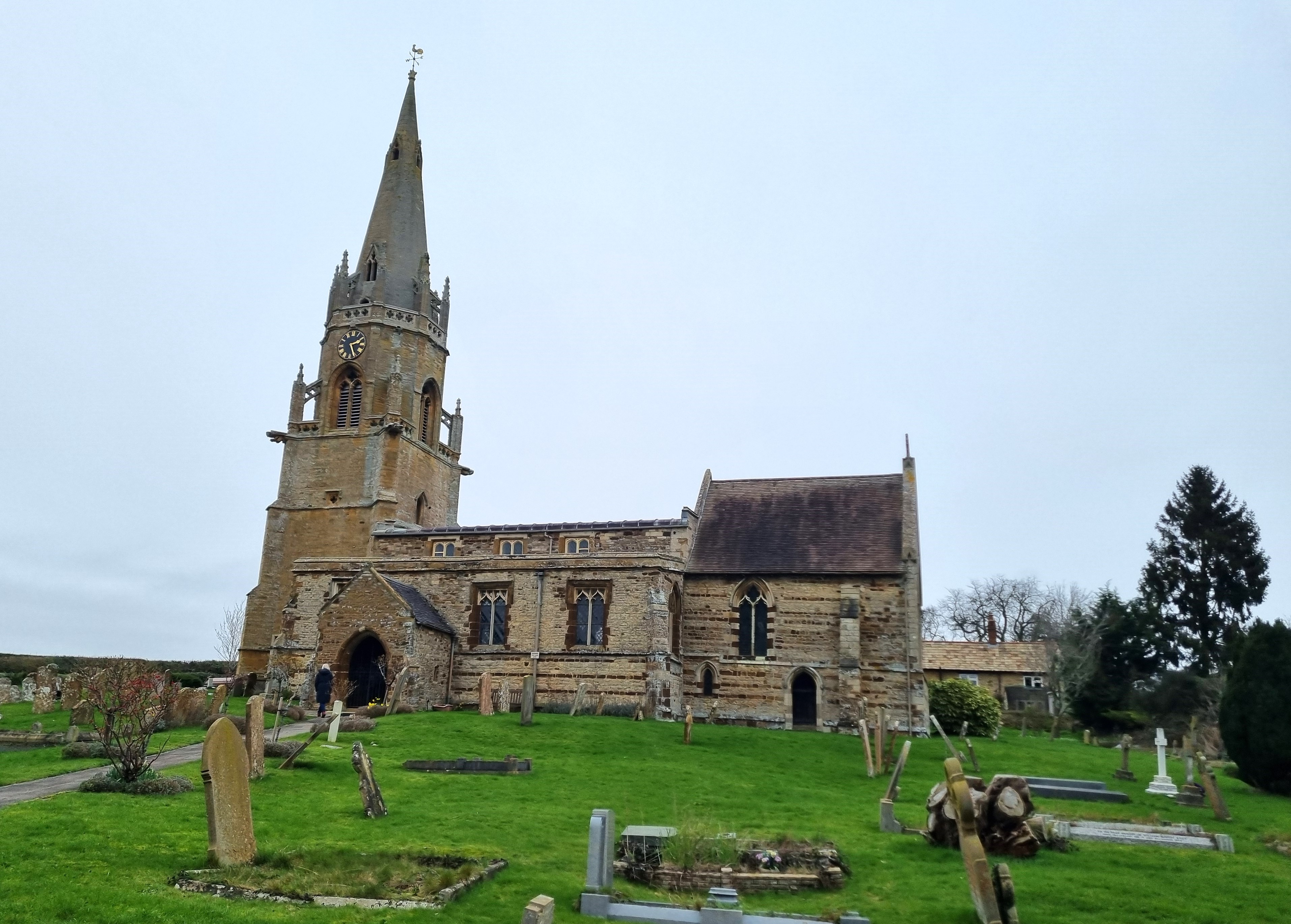
- Church of St Mary the Virgin

- Location within Northamptonshire
- Population: 643 (2021 census)
- OS grid reference: SP8666
  - London: 69.8 miles (112.3 km)
- Unitary authority: North Northamptonshire
- Ceremonial county: Northamptonshire
- Region: East Midlands
- Country: England
- Sovereign state: United Kingdom
- Post town: WELLINGBOROUGH
- Postcode district: NN8
- Dialling code: 01933
- Police: Northamptonshire
- Fire: Northamptonshire
- Ambulance: East Midlands
- UK Parliament: Wellingborough

Wilby is a suburban linear village and civil parish in the Wellingborough built-up area of North Northamptonshire, England. The suburb is 3 miles south-west of Wellingborough town centre.

The village is often considered a suburb of Wellingborough, due to its close proximity to the town, as well as having a Wellingborough town post code, as opposed to a Wellingborough rural post code.

It is directly south-west of the town of Wellingborough on the former trunk road, the A4500, to the county town of Northampton. At the time of the 2021 census, the parish's population was 643 people. It is also thought to date to the Victorian times.

The village's name origin is dubious. 'farm/settlement of Willa' or 'farm/settlement of Villi'. Later sources show similarity to Old English 'wilig' meaning 'willow'.

The village is governed as part of North Northamptonshire. Before changes in 2021 it was governed by the Wellingborough Borough Council.

Wilby has a Church of England and Voluntary Aided Primary School, a small village faith school built in 1854. Its current headteacher is Lisa Pearce.

The village also contains a working men's club, a pub, a café, a car garage, a Christian church, a hairdresser, a recreational ground and a pre-school..
