= Little Harrowden =

Village in Northamptonshire, England

Coordinates: 52.3348°N 0.7319°W

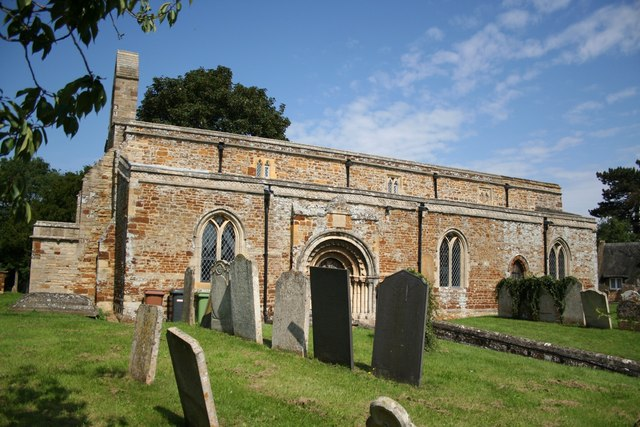
- St Mary's Church, Little Harrowden

- Location within Northamptonshire
- Population: 892 (2011)
- OS grid reference: SP8671
- Civil parish: Little Harrowden
- Unitary authority: North Northamptonshire
- Ceremonial county: Northamptonshire
- Region: East Midlands
- Country: England
- Sovereign state: United Kingdom
- Post town: WELLINGBOROUGH
- Postcode district: NN9
- Dialling code: 01933
- Police: Northamptonshire
- Fire: Northamptonshire
- Ambulance: East Midlands
- UK Parliament: Wellingborough

Little Harrowden is a village and civil parish in North Northamptonshire, England. The village is nearly 3 miles (4.8 km) north-west of Wellingborough, off the A509 road. At the 2011 Census, the population of the parish was 892.

The village is in one of the longest and narrowest parishes in Northamptonshire and is built around the Church of St Mary the Virgin, which dates back to circa 1190. The population of the parish is spread across various occupations from industrial in the east to farming in the west.

The local primary school, established over 350 years ago, along with the village hall, act as focal points in the village. The only pub, The Lamb, which was run by Charles Wells closed in 2022.

== Governance ==
Little Harrowden is governed by North Northamptonshire council. Before local government changes in 2021 it was in the North Ward of the Borough Council of Wellingborough and was in the Finedon area for Northamptonshire County Council. The Member of Parliament is Gen Kitchen (Labour, Wellingborough & Rushden).

== History ==
The village's name means 'Heathen temple hill'.

Property at Little Harrowden, Raunds and Wellingborough was included in the marriage settlement between Henry Gage and Margaret Boyville. Henry Gage was a substantial landowner in 16th century Northampton and was a son of John Gage and his wife Margaret Tawyer. On 30 September 1484, King Richard III granted to Thomas Metcalfe, the Chancellor of the Duchy of Lancaster, wardship and control of the marriage of Henry, a minor who was the son and heir of John Gage, a gentleman who had held land direct from the Crown. Henry married Margaret Boyville, a daughter of Richard Boyville. Under the marriage agreement which was made on 12 June 1505, Henry agreed to marry Margaret before the next 29 September and to settle his property on Richard and others beforehand. Richard agreed to give the couple certain stuff worth 100 shillings when they set up their household plus 20 marks; George Boyville also agreed to provide them with 100 shillings (£5). By the associated feoffment which was made on 29 July 1505, Henry (who was then described as a gentleman of Little Harrowden) granted all his property at Little Harrowden, Raunds and Wellingborough to Richard Boyville, John Muscote, George Boyville, Richard Whelewright, clerk and Thomas Catelyn of Raunds. In accordance with the terms of the marriage agreement, these trustees were to hold the property to the use of Henry and Margaret; then to the heirs of their body and in default of such heirs to the right heirs of Henry; the marriage itself presumably took place on the same day or very soon after.

Records included in “The Visitations of Northamptonshire in 1564 and 1618–19” list three children of Henry Gage and Margaret Boyville:

- George – married Cecily Wolston
- Mary – married James Foljambe
- Anne – married Anthony Shuckburgh (son of Balthazar Shuckburgh (II)) and their son was Thomas Shuckburgh who married Bridget Wheeler and their daughter was Margaret Shuckburgh (1585–1657) who married Francis Alderman of Harweden (Harrowden).

The property at Little Harrowden, Raunds and Wellingborough included in the 1505 marriage settlement was held in trust, so it was not mentioned in Henry's will. However, the will does confirm Henry's bequest of the house in which he lived at Burton Latimer.

The manor of Little Harrowden evidently remained in Henry's ownership until the end of his life and it was not until 1553 that his son and daughter in law George and Cecily conveyed it to Anthony Shuckburgh, the husband of their daughter Anne. Anthony and Annes son Thomas Shuckborough senior and Bridget his wife were dealing with the manor of Little Harrowden alias 'SHUCKBOROUGHS' in 1611 and 1619, and Thomas Shuckborough junior and Eleanor his wife in 1623 granted it to John Sanderson, who with his wife Cecily and John Sanderson junior in 1632 conveyed it to Edward Vaux, Lord Harrowden.

== Landmarks ==
St Mary's church dates mainly from the Norman period and is a Grade II* listed stone building in the Transitional style, from Early English to Decorated; and consists of chancel, with south vestry, clerestoried nave of four bays, aisles, south porch and, until 1967, an embattled western tower, containing a clock and four bells.

The oldest part of the church is the main south doorway which dates from c 1195, and exhibits some good Norman work. This was the south doorway of an aisle-less 12th century church. There is also a smaller door of the same period, also on the south side. To this early building a south aisle was first added. Then early in the 14th century the nave was extended eastwards, a new chancel built, a north aisle was remodelled and extended.

Thus in the early 14th century the church took on substantially its present shape. The north aisle was built in 1850, at a cost of £600, this took the place of the one demolished at an earlier date. The organ was erected by subscription in 1876 at a cost of £150.

The tower was originally surmounted by a spire, but this fell in a storm in 1703 and was not rebuilt. The impressive Norman tower itself became unsafe and was demolished in September 1967.The tower was replaced by a single storey vestry with a glazed tower arch and bellcote at the apex, housing the smallest of the original four bells.

The lower part of the gothic tower arch has been filled with a war-memorial oak screen which has the names of the men from the parishes of Great and Little Harrowden that were killed in the Great War. Brass plaques added to the screen have the names of those men that perished in World War 2.
