= Sywell =

Village in Northamptonshire, England

Coordinates: 52.2994°N 0.7893°W

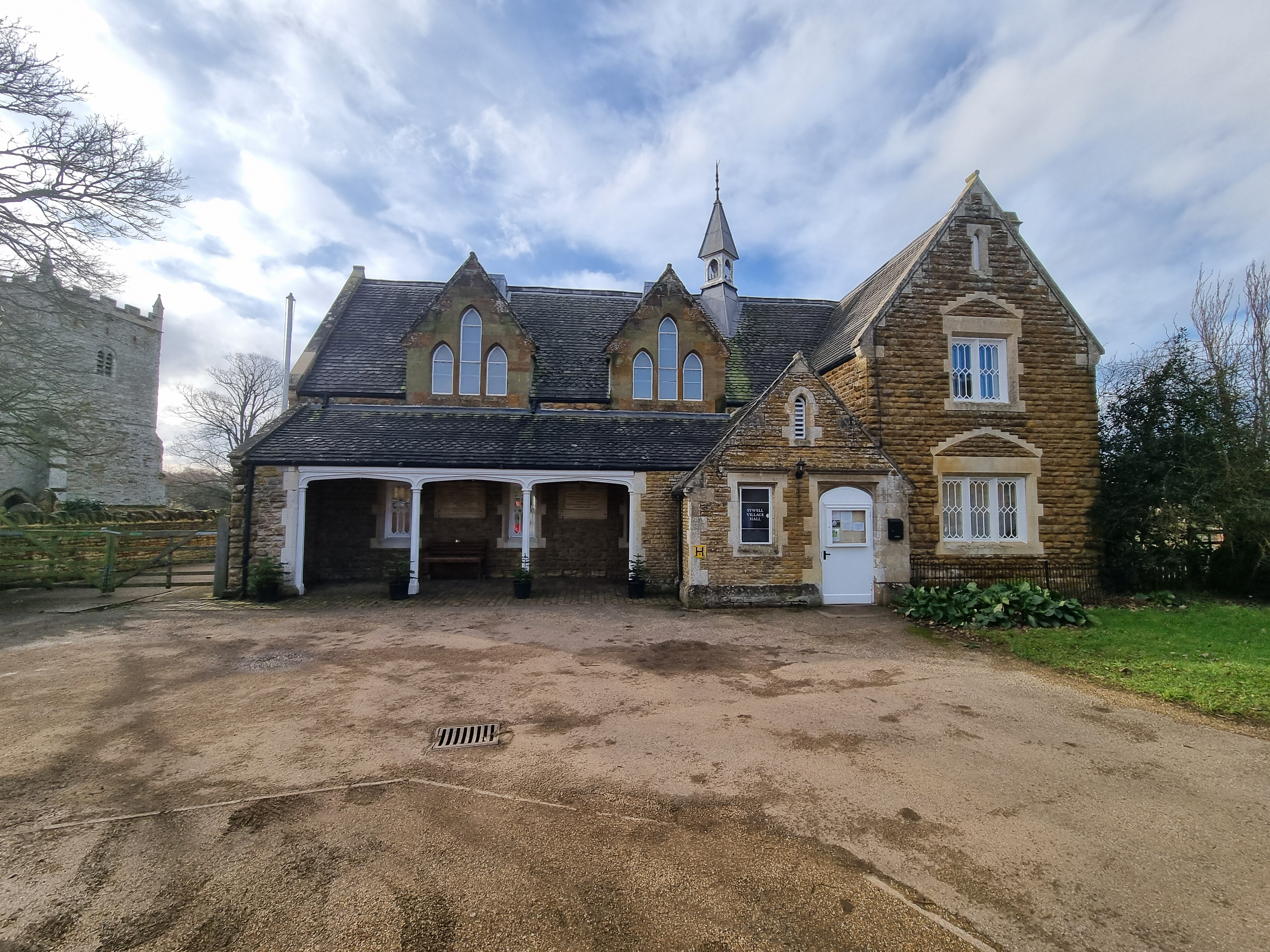
- Sywell Village Hall

- Location within Northamptonshire
- Population: 792 (2011 Census)
- OS grid reference: SP825675
- Civil parish: Sywell
- Unitary authority: North Northamptonshire
- Ceremonial county: Northamptonshire
- Region: East Midlands
- Country: England
- Sovereign state: United Kingdom
- Post town: NORTHAMPTON
- Postcode district: NN6
- Dialling code: 01604
- Police: Northamptonshire
- Fire: Northamptonshire
- Ambulance: East Midlands
- UK Parliament: Wellingborough

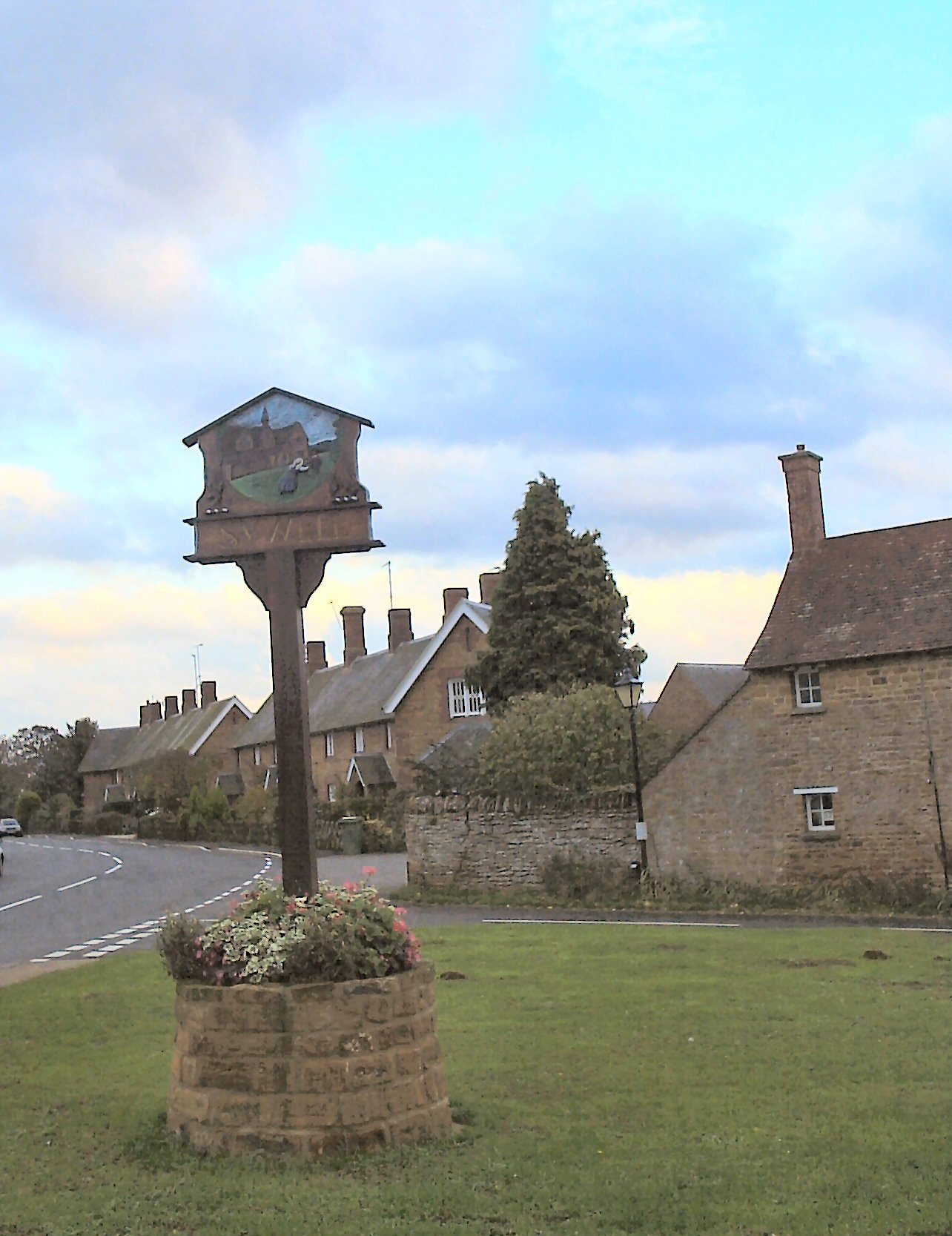
The village sign - Sywell

Sywell is a village and civil parish in North Northamptonshire, England. At the 2011 Census, the population of the parish was 792.

The name Sywell is thought to mean "seven wells".

== Facilities ==
The facilities found in the village include:

- The church (St Peter & St Paul)
- Sywell Aerodrome, opened in 1928 and active during World War II
- Sywell Aviation Museum at the aerodrome
- The Horseshoe pub
- Overstone Squash Club
- Overstone Solarium (caravan park)
- The Overstone Manor (family pub)
- Sywell Reservoir (redundant as a working reservoir and now a country park)
- Overstone Park Cricket Club
- Sywell CEVA Primary School

== Other ==
The Ecton Lane part of the village is built just inside the walls of Overstone Hall; the estate wall is of fine quality and in village folklore is said to be seven feet high, be seven miles long and took seven men seven years to build.

== Pevsner on Sywell ==
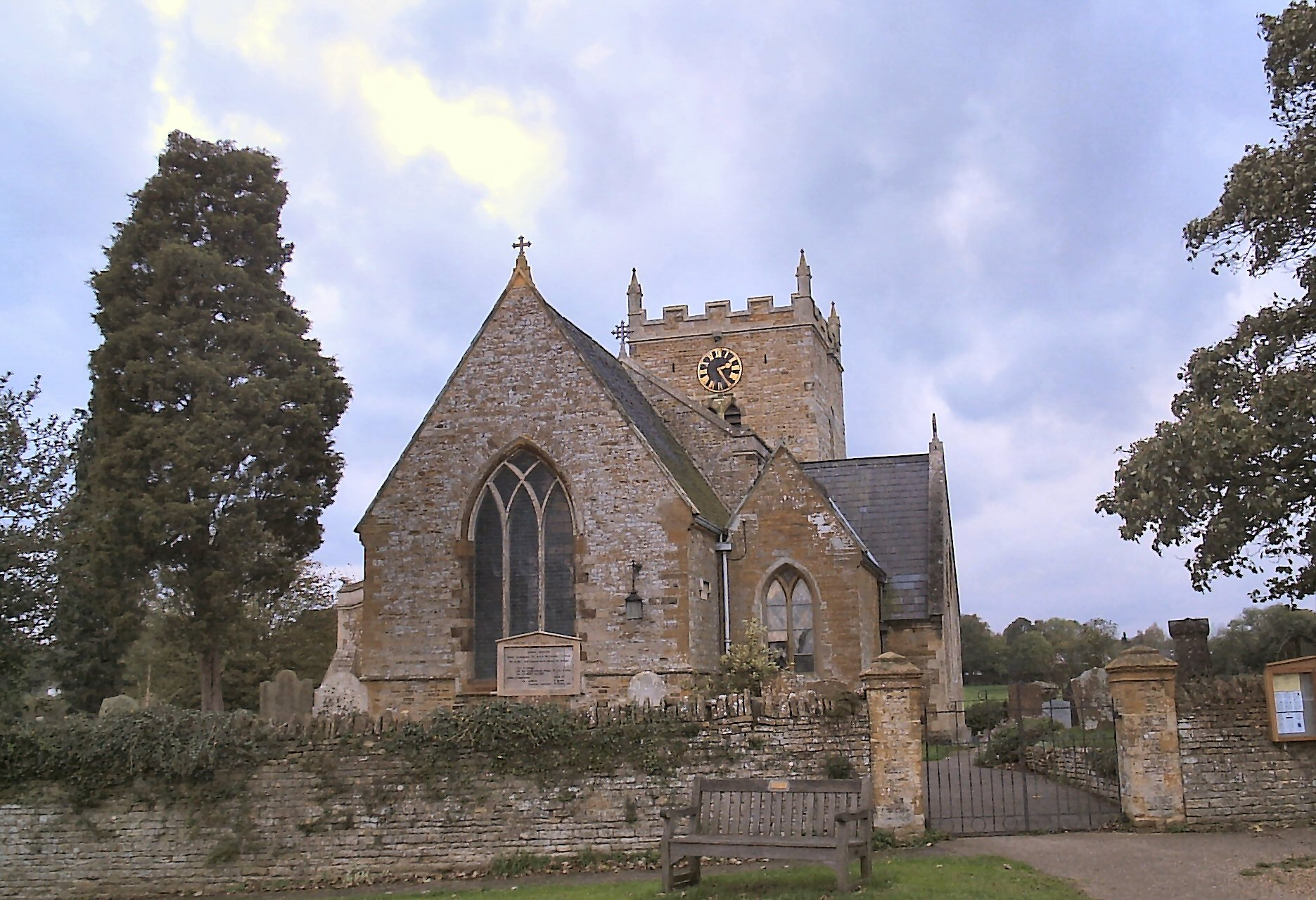
The church at Sywell

Church - this has a short tower dating to the 13th century. The pretty stair projection found in the west side of the church is not medieval as it appears. Renovations dating from the 1870s have left the church with an odd feel. There is a stained glass window by Thomas Willement dating from 1839, which is very fine. It uses heraldic glass dating from 1580.

Sywell Hall - the hall has a long straight front with two small and one larger gable ends. The house appears to originally date from Elizabethan times.

Village - many local houses were rebuilt by Lady Overstone in the 1860s - with the (old) school dating to 1861 and the rectory's rebuilding to 1862.

The church's plate dates from 1816 and is the work of Patten.

The airfield hosts an annual concert called "Music in the Air". A combination of classical music and aviation.

== Links with the village from the Dictionary of National Biography ==
- Anthony Jenkinson, merchant, sea-captain, and traveller married Judith Mersh of Sywell in 1567. In 1578 he bought the village from his father in law and moved to the village.
- Lewis Atterbury was appointed rector of the village in 1684.
- William Lancaster (died 1717) - scholar; was married to a daughter of a Mr Wilmer from Sywell.
- Admiral Sir Watkin Owen Pell was the son of Samuel Pell of Sywell Hall.
- Bishop Archibald Robertson (Bishop of Exeter) was born at Sywell in 1853.
- William Tresham, Speaker of the House of Commons (died 1450) was the eldest son of Thomas Tresham of Sywell. He was also the father of another speaker Thomas Tresham (died 1471).
