= Borough of Wellingborough =

Former borough in England

Coordinates: 52°18′05″N 0°41′40″W

- Non-metropolitan district and borough
- Shown within Northamptonshire
- Sovereign state: United Kingdom
- Constituent country: England
- Region: East Midlands
- Ceremonial county: Northamptonshire
- Admin. HQ: Wellingborough

Government
  - Type: Borough Council of Wellingborough
  - Leadership: Alternative - Sec.31
  - Executive

Area
  - Total: 62.95 sq mi (163.04 km^{2})

Population (2019)
  - Total: 79,707
  - Density: 1,266.2/sq mi (488.88/km^{2})
- Time zone: UTC+0 (Greenwich Mean Time)
  - Summer (DST): UTC+1 (British Summer Time)
- ONS code: 34UH (ONS); E07000156 (GSS)
- Ethnicity: 90.8% White; 4.5% S.Asian; 2.5% Afro-Caribbean
- Website: wellingborough.gov.uk

The Borough of Wellingborough was a non-metropolitan district and borough in Northamptonshire, England, from 1974 to 2021. It was named after Wellingborough, its main town, but also included surrounding rural areas.

The local council preferred to call itself the "Borough Council of Wellingborough" rather than the more usual form "Wellingborough Borough Council".

The borough covered almost the same area as the Wellingborough constituency. It was formed on 1 April 1974, under the Local Government Act 1972, by a merger of the borough of Wellingborough with Wellingborough Rural District.

The borough bordered the districts of South Northamptonshire, Northampton, Kettering, Daventry and East Northamptonshire, as well as Milton Keynes in Buckinghamshire, and Bedford in Bedfordshire.

== Abolition and replacement ==
In March 2018, following suspension of the County Council arising from its becoming insolvent, due to financial and cultural mismanagement by the cabinet and officers, the then Secretary of State for Local Government, Sajid Javid, sent commissioner Max Caller into the council, who recommended the county council and all district and borough councils in the county be abolished, and replaced by two unitary authorities, one covering the West, and one the North of the county. These proposals were approved in April 2019. It meant that the districts of Daventry, Northampton and South Northamptonshire were merged to form a new unitary authority called West Northamptonshire, whilst the second unitary authority North Northamptonshire consists of Corby, East Northamptonshire, Kettering and Wellingborough districts. These new authorities came into being on 1 April 2021. Elections for the new authorities were due to be held on 7 May 2020, but were delayed due to the COVID-19 pandemic.

Concurrent with these changes, the unparished area of Wellingborough was established as a civil parish and gained a Town Council.

== Settlements and parishes ==
Civil parishes of the Borough of Wellingborough upon its creation in 1974

Other than Wellingborough itself the borough included:

- Bozeat
- Earls Barton
- Easton Maudit
- Ecton
- Finedon
- Great Doddington
- Great Harrowden
- Grendon
- Hardwick
- Irchester
- Isham
- Little Harrowden,
- Little Irchester
- Mears Ashby
- Orlingbury
- Strixton
- Sywell
- Wilby
- Wollaston

The following changes to civil parishes took place over the district's history:

- 1 April 1983: Finedon re-created out of part of the Wellingborough unparished area.
- 1 April 2021: Wellingborough parish created out of the Wellingborough unparished area and parts of the parishes of Finedon and Great Harrowden.

== Political control ==
See Wellingborough Borough Council elections

== Arms ==
Coat of arms of Borough of Wellingborough

Crest
On a wreath of the colours in front of an annulet embattled on the outer edge per pale Gules and Sable a Garb Or.
Escutcheon
Per pale Gules and Or five roundels barry wavy of six those on the dexter Or and Gules and those on the sinister Gules and Or the centre roundel Or and Gules per pale counter-changed.
Supporters
On the dexter side a bull guardant Sable armed and supporting an abbatical crozier Or with veil Proper and on the sinister side a lion guardant Or armed and langued Gules supporting with the front paw a currier's shave Proper.
Motto
Forward Together
Badge
A roundel barry wavy of six Gules and Or ensigned with a mural crown also Or with flames issuant Proper.
