= List of council estates in the United Kingdom =

This is a list of notable council estates. Public housing in the United Kingdom has typically consisted of council houses, often built in the form of large estates by local government councils.

Becontree in the London Borough of Barking and Dagenham is generally considered to be the largest council estate (in terms of population). Some council estates, such as Heygate Estate (setting of the film Harry Brown) in London, or Hulme Crescents in Manchester, have been demolished.

== England ==
=== London ===
==== Largest ====
	Estate	Image	Dates	Location	Size (units)	Notes/Description
1	Churchill Gardens		1946–62 built	Pimlico area of Westminster 51.487°N 0.140°W	1,600	Designed by architects Powell and Moya to replace Victorian terraced houses extensively damaged during the Blitz; won RIBA London Architectural Bronze Medal (1950); model for many later projects.
2	Grahame Park		1971 first move-in	Colindale area of Barnet, London; 51.602°N 0.248°W	1,177	Built on site of the old Hendon Aerodrome in North West London. Named after Claude Grahame-White, aviation pioneer who established the aerodrome. Plain, square, brick terraced houses and "Brick Brutalist" low-rise flats. Brick Brutalist Colindale, currently being demolished/refurbished
3	Becontree		1921–35 built	Barking and Dagenham, London; 51.5487°N 0.1427°E	26,000	Built by London County Council outside of the then-limits of County of London. Population over 100,000; asserted to be the largest public housing development in the world.
	Chalkhill Estate		1966–70 built	Wembley Park area of Brent, London; 51.564°N 0.270°W	1,900	Early example of compulsory purchase; many homes of 1921 era Metroland-type development had to be demolished. Charges of engineering area to swing MP seat from Conservative to Labour were levied, though in fact Conservative served from 1974 to 1997. Low—rises and 30 high-rise "Bison" built blocks. Design based on that of Park Hill in Sheffield.
	Stonebridge Estate		1960s–1970s built	Brent, London; 51.541637°N 0.261200°W	1,775	Highest recorded gun crime of any ward in London.
	South Kilburn		1959–1970s built; redevelopments 2014-	Brent, London; 51.530°N 0.197°W		Low-rise flats and 11 concrete tower blocks in Brutalist style. Severe crime problems.
	St Raphael's Estate		1967–82 built	Brent, London; 51.550536°N 0.264883°W	1,174	Low density.

==== Other ====
- Greenwich/Bexley
  - Thamesmead Estate, Thamesmead
  - Ferrier Estate, Kidbrooke
  - Barnfield Estate, Woolwich
  - Cherry Orchard Estate, Charlton
- Hillingdon
- Hackney
  - Nightingale Estate
  - Kingshold
  - London Fields
  - Homerton
  - Pembury Estate
- Haringey
  - Broadwater Farm, Tottenham
- Islington
  - Andover Estate, Upper Holloway
- Lewisham
  - Excalibur Estate, Catford
  - Woodpecker Estate, New Cross/Deptford
  - Pepys Estate, Deptford
  - Honor Oak Estate, Brockley
- Lambeth
  - Angell Town Estate, Brixton
  - Loughborough Junction, Brixton
  - Somerleyton Estate, Brixton
  - Myatt's Fields Estate, Brixton
  - New Park Road Estate, Brixton Hill
- Merton
  - St Helier Estate, Morden
- Newham
  - Carpenters Estate, Stratford
  - Custom House
- Redbridge
  - Hainault
- Southwark
  - Aylesbury Estate currently being demolished
  - Brandon Estate, Walworth
  - Kingswood Estate, Sydenham Hill
  - Ledbury Estate, Peckham
  - North Peckham Estate, Peckham
- Sutton
  - Roundshaw Estate, Wallington
- Tower Hamlets
  - Lansbury Estate, Poplar
  - Cranbrook Estate, Bethnal Green
  - Brownfield Estate, Poplar
  - Samuda Estate, Isle Of Dogs
  - St John's Estate, Isle Of Dogs
  - Barkantine Estate, Millwall
- Wandsworth
  - Alton Estate, Roehampton
  - Doddington and Rollo Estate, Battersea
  - Winstanley and York Road Estate, Clapham Junction

=== West Midlands ===
	Estate	Image	Dates	Location	Size (units)	Notes/Description
2	Austin Village		1917 built	Northfield, Birmingham-adjacent; 52.401°N 1.973°W	200	Cedar prefabricated bungalows erected during the First World War to support Austin Motor Company's manufacture of tanks and aircraft.

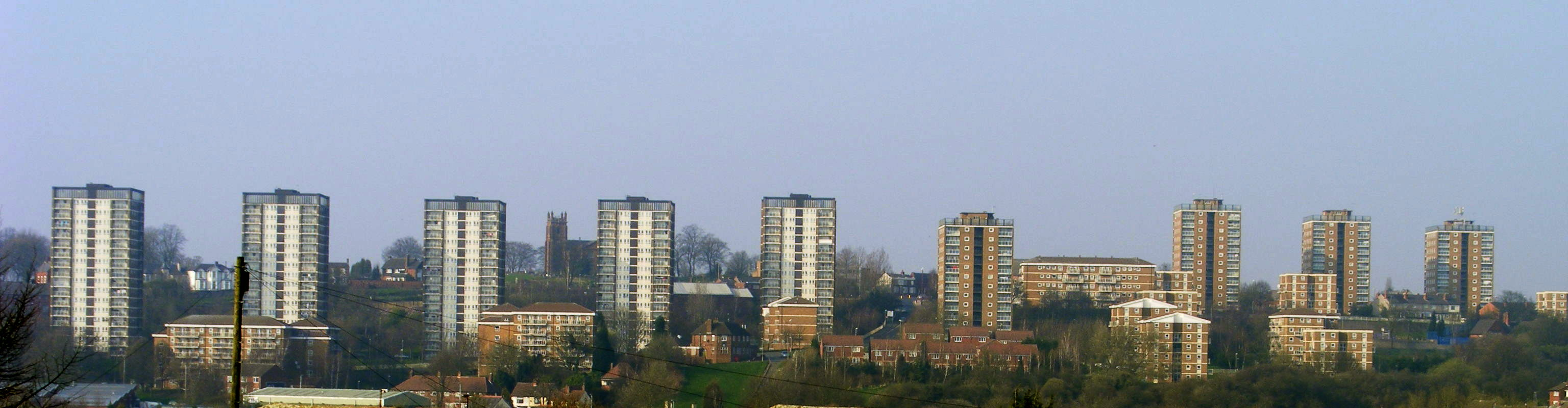
Brierley Hill flats in Dudley

==== Birmingham ====
- Druids Heath
- Hawkesley
- Castle Vale
- Billesley
- Yardley Wood
- Warstock
- Frankley

==== Dudley ====
- Wren's Nest Estate, Dudley
- Priory Estate, Dudley
- Russells Hall Estate, Dudley
- Chapel Street Estate, Brierley Hill

==== Sandwell ====
- Hateley Heath, West Bromwich
- Tantany, West Bromwich
- Friar Park, Wednesbury
- Tibbington, Tipton
- Galton Village, Smethwick

==== Solihull ====
- Chelmsley Wood

==== Walsall ====
- Coal Pool, Walsall
- Beechdale, Walsall

==== Wolverhampton ====
- Ashmore Park, Wednesfield, Wolverhampton
- The Lunt, Bilston, Wolverhampton

==== Telford ====
- Woodside

=== Greater Manchester ===
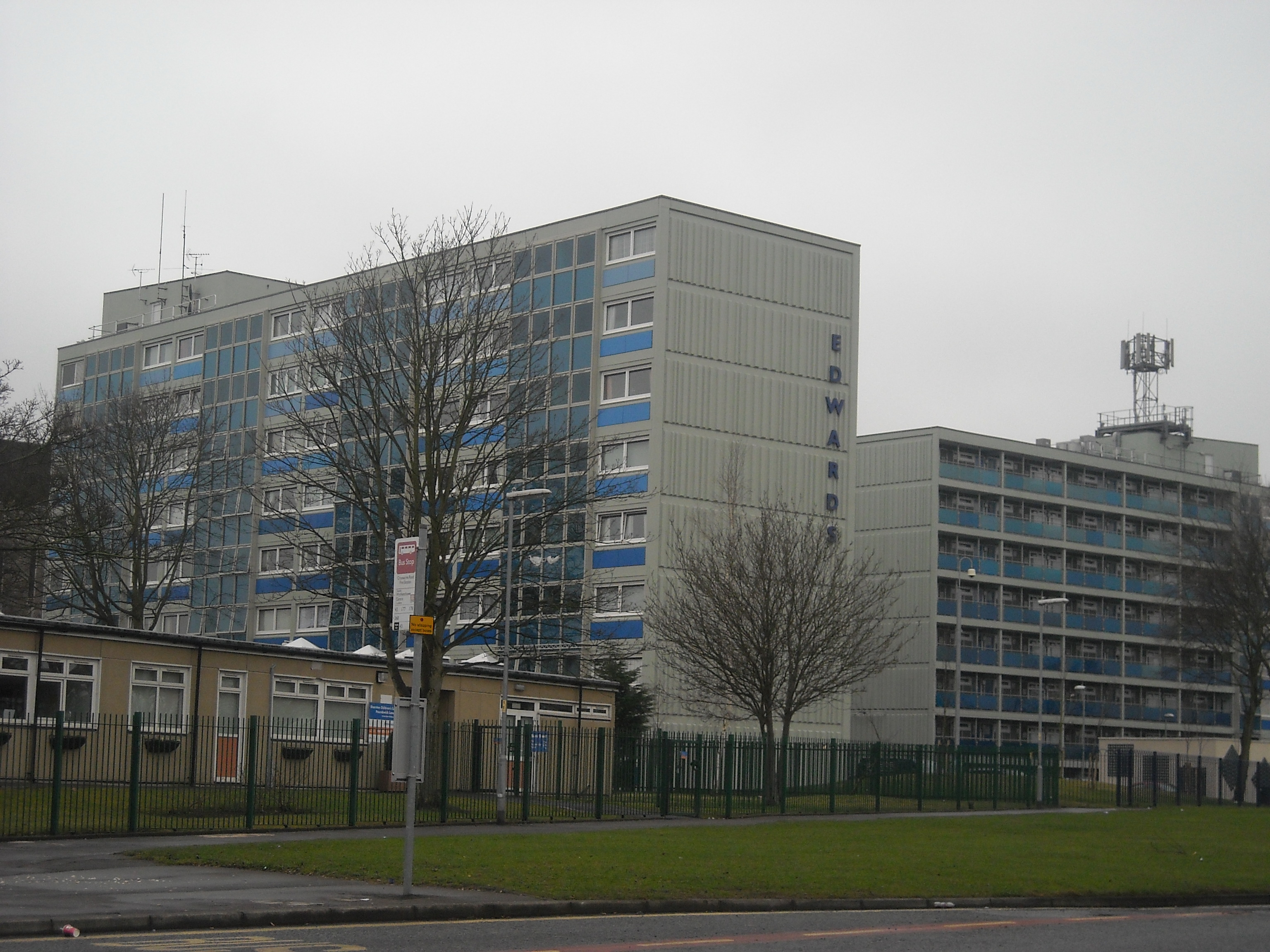
Flats on Birchtree Court, Wythenshawe, Manchester

==== City of Manchester ====
- Wythenshawe

==== Tameside ====
- Hattersley

=== West Yorkshire ===
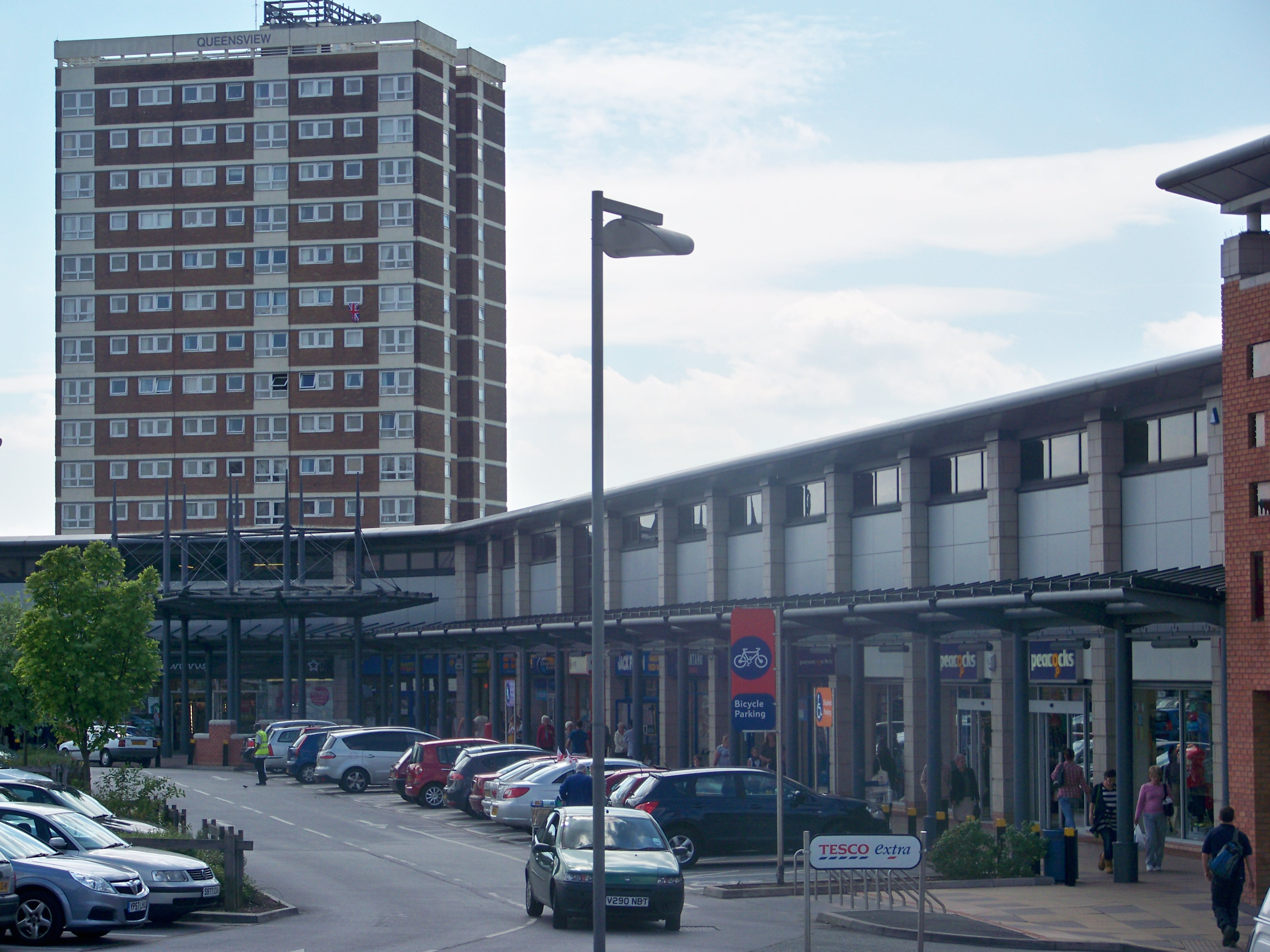
Queensview Tower in Seacroft, Leeds

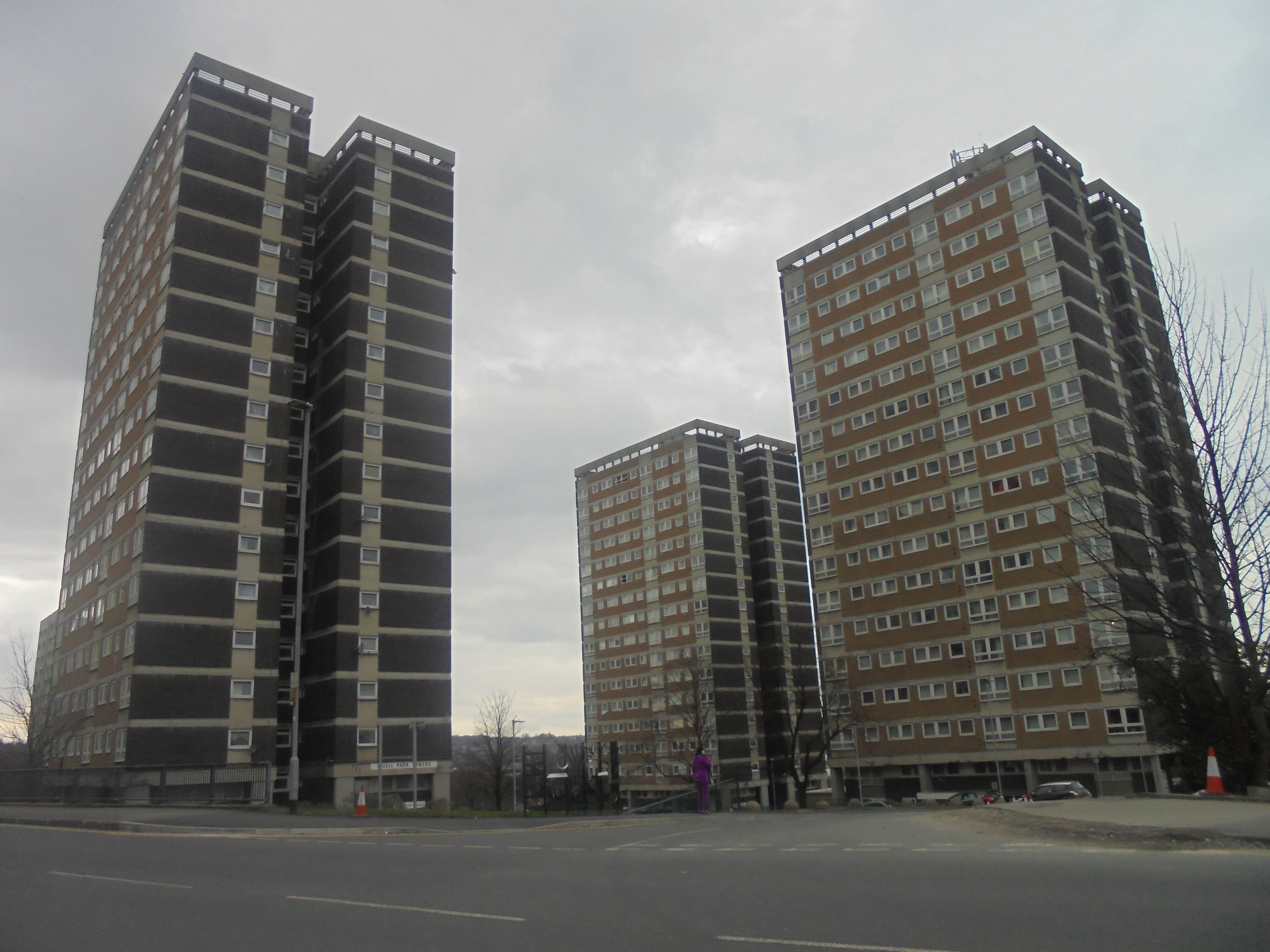
Lovell Park Flats, Leeds

==== Leeds ====
- Beeston
- Bramley
- Cottingley
- Halton Moor
- Lincoln Green (Burmantofts)
- Little London
- Lovell Park
- Seacroft
- Wortley

=== South Yorkshire ===
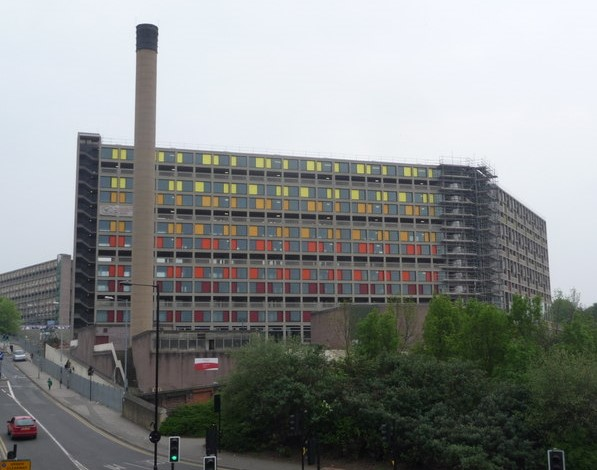
Renovated Park Hill flats in Sheffield

==== Sheffield ====
- Park Hill
- Gleadless Valley
- Parson Cross

=== North Yorkshire ===
==== Middlesbrough ====
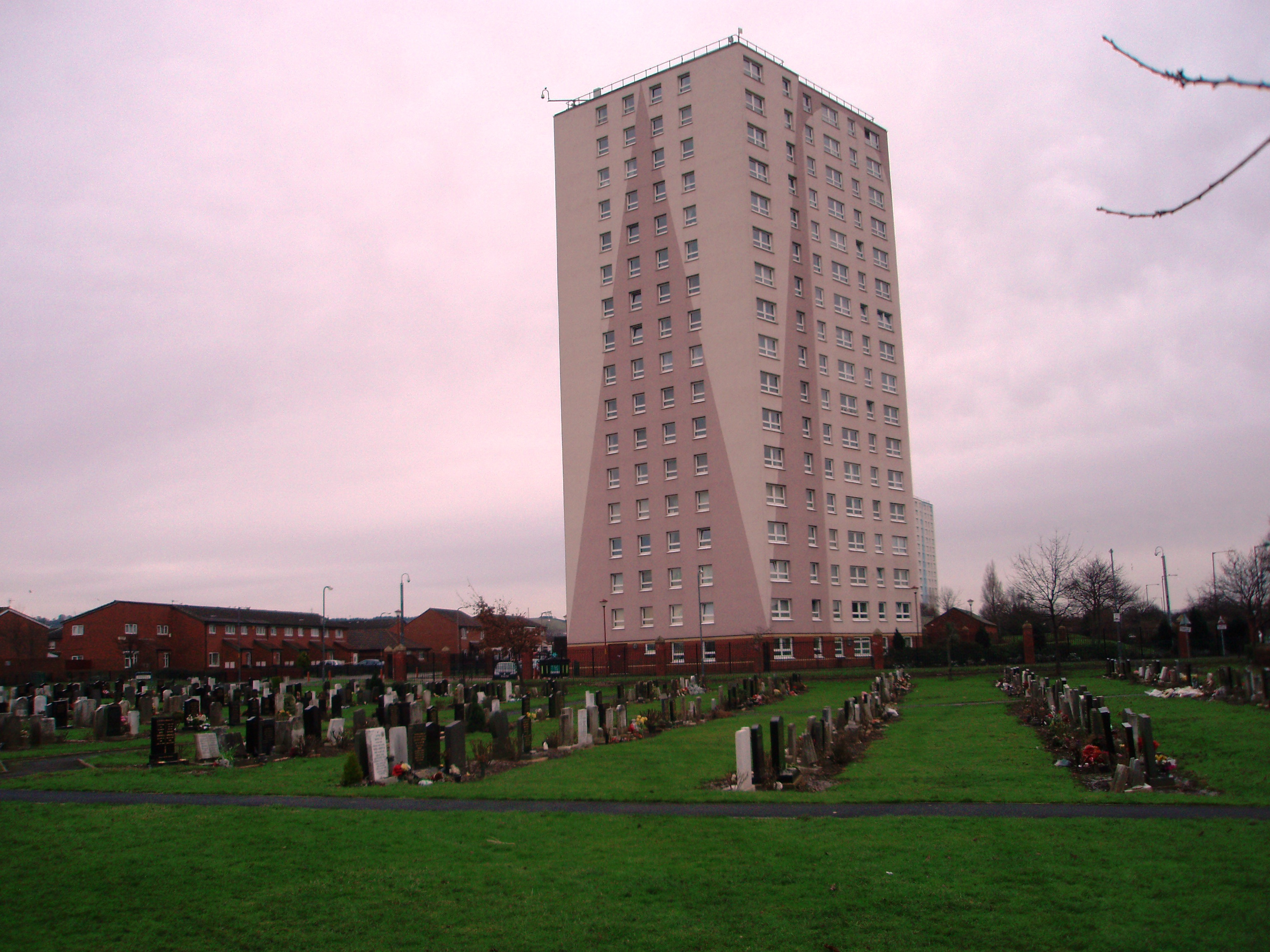
Block of Council Flats in Middlesbrough

- Grove Hill

=== East Riding of Yorkshire ===
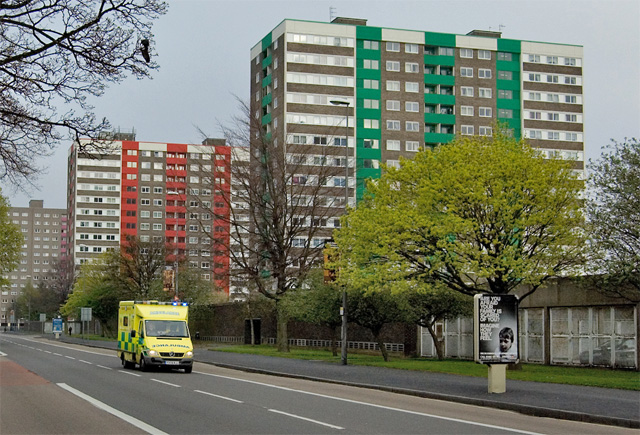
High Rise Flats on Anlaby Road, Hull

==== Kingston upon Hull ====
- Bransholme
- Orchard Park

=== Merseyside ===
==== Knowsley ====
- Stockbridge Village

==== Liverpool ====
- Norris Green
- Speke

=== Norfolk ===
==== Norwich ====
- Mile Cross
- Heartsease

==== Kings Lynn ====
- Fairstead, Norfolk

=== Northamptonshire ===
==== Wellingborough ====
- Hemmingwell
- Kingsway
- Queensway

=== Hampshire ===
==== Portsmouth ====
- Paulsgrove

==== Havant ====
- Leigh Park
- Wecock Farm

==== Southampton ====
- Townhill Park
- Redbridge
- Thornhill
- Weston
- Northam
- Millbrook

=== Oxfordshire ===
==== Oxford ====
- Blackbird Leys estate

=== Surrey ===
==== Mole Valley ====
- Goodwyns, Dorking

=== Tyne and Wear ===
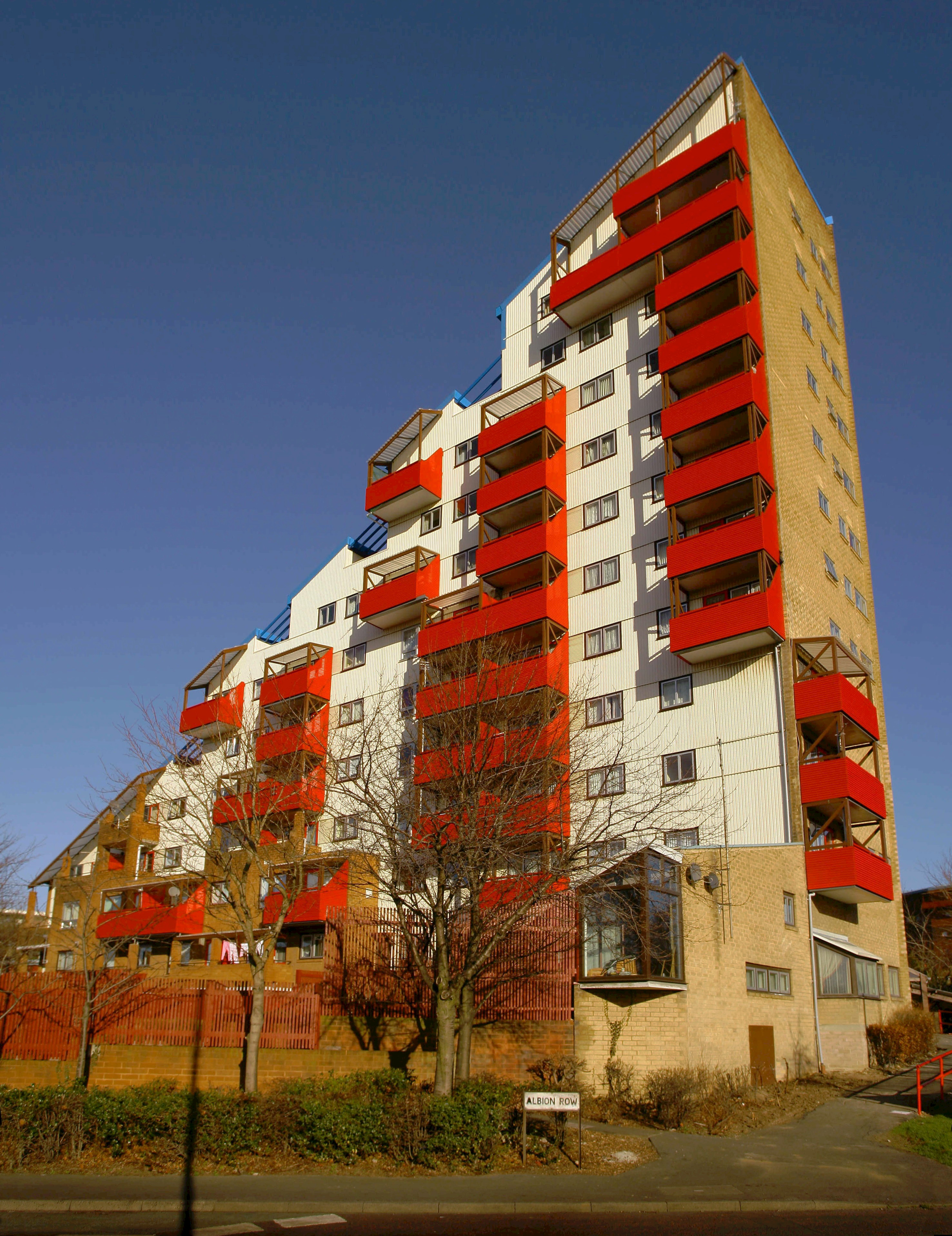
Tom Collins House, Byker Wall Estate, Newcastle Upon Tyne

==== Newcastle upon Tyne ====
- Byker (population approx 9,500)

==== Sunderland ====
- Pennywell (population 10,709)

== Scotland ==
=== Glasgow ===
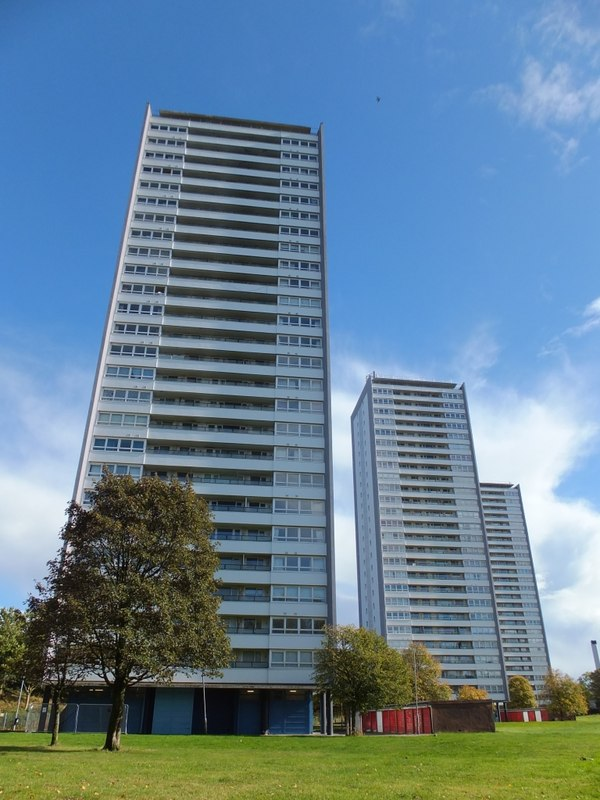
High rise flats in Wyndford Road, Glasgow

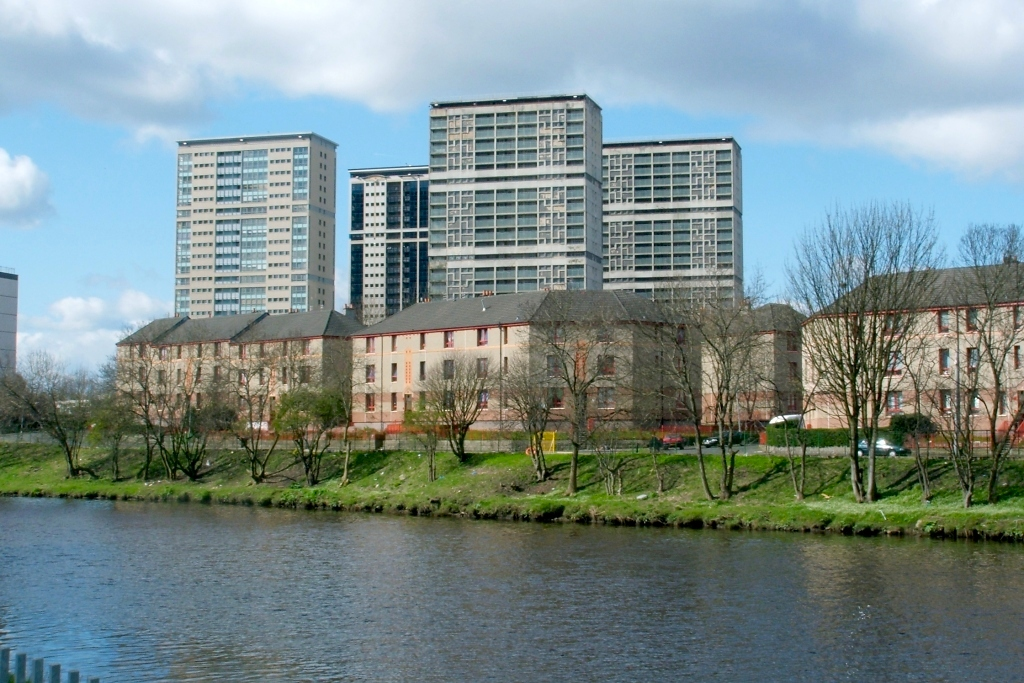
Tower Blocks in Hutchesontown in Glasgow

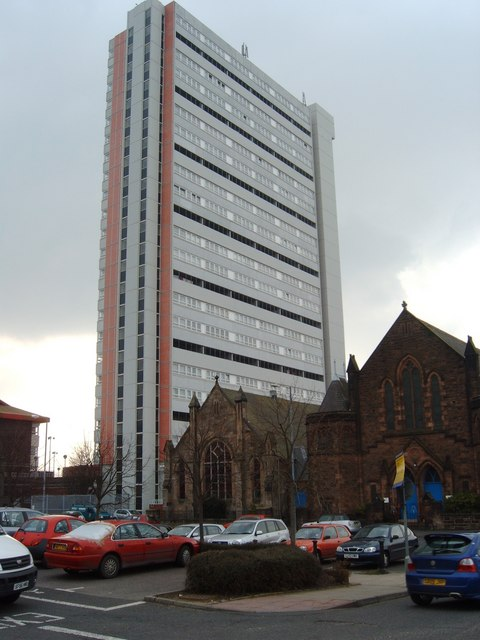
Anniesland Court in Anniesland, North West Glasgow

- Easterhouse (widely rebuilt)
- Castlemilk (partially rebuilt)
- Drumchapel (partially rebuilt)
- Pollok
- Red Road (demolished)
- Sighthill (demolished)
- Blackhill (rebuilt)
- Toryglen (partially rebuilt)
- Carnwadric
- Arden
- Hamiltonhill
- Wyndford
- Carntyne
- Riddrie
- Barlanark
- Darnley (rebuilt)
- Ruchazie
- Barmulloch
- Penilee
- Merrylee
- Garthamlock
- Craigend
- Cranhill (partially rebuilt)

=== Edinburgh ===
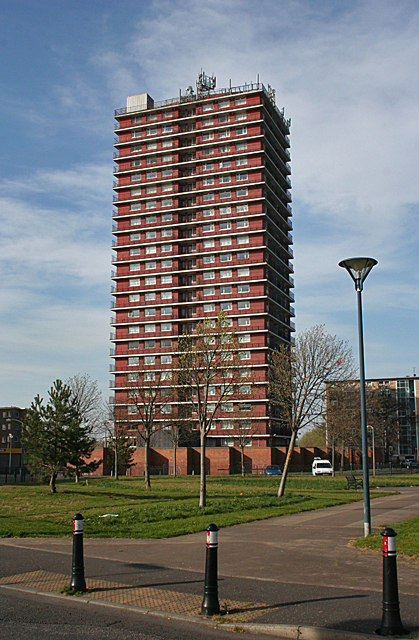
Tower Block in Muirhouse, Edinburgh

- East Pilton
- Muirhouse
- Greendykes
- Moredun
- Oxgangs
- Cables Wynd House
- Dumbiedykes
- Lochend
- Gilmerton

=== Dundee ===
- Whitfield
- Ardler
- Fintry
- Logie
- Menzieshill
- Kirkton

=== Other ===
- Faifley
- Ferguslie Park
- Foxbar
- Gallowhill
- Gowkthrapple
- Hillhouse
- Whitlawburn

== Northern Ireland ==
=== Greater Belfast ===
- Ballybeen
- Rathcoole (Newtownabbey)

=== Derry ===
- Creggan
