= Overspill estate =

Housing for relocated inner-city residents

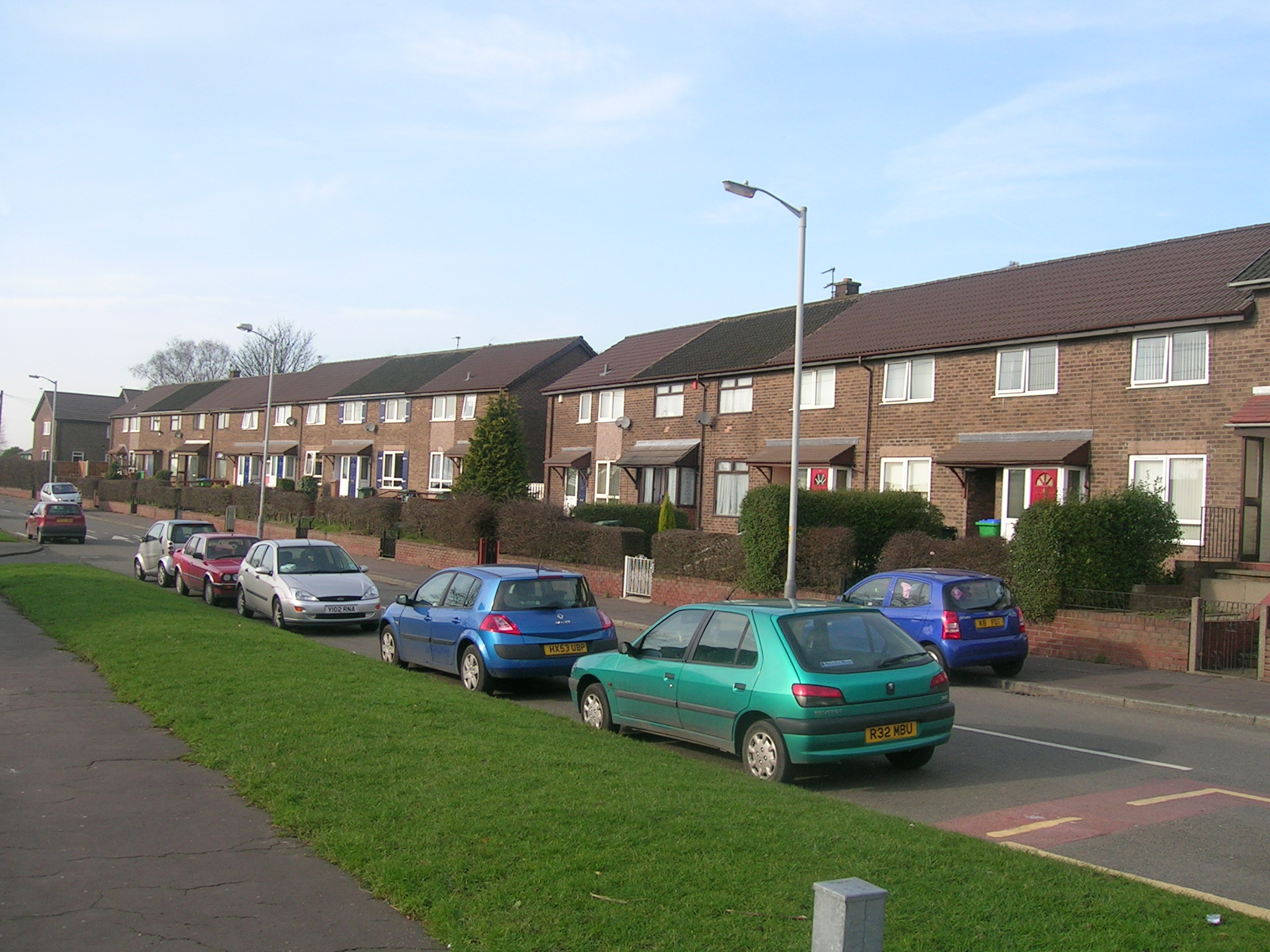
The Darnhill estate near Heywood, Greater Manchester was built by Manchester Corporation between 1947 and the 1960s as overspill housing.

An overspill estate is a housing estate built at the edge of an urban area, often to rehouse people from inner city areas as part of slum clearances. They were created on the outskirts of most large British towns in the 20th century. The Town Development Act 1952 encouraged the expansion of neighbouring urban areas rather than the creation of satellite communities.

== Aims of overspill estates ==
‘Overspill theory’ aims to simultaneously support suburban growth in less densely populated areas, whilst also reducing congestion within inner city areas. It is a method of urban management which attempts to reduce the amount of “slum dwellers” in inner city areas by moving them to the periphery of the town in question. Overspill estates were intended to be self-sufficient and mostly removed industrially and economically from the capital city from which they were derived. UK authorities did not want overspill estates to become “dormitory towns”, meaning that tenants of the estates would continue to work in the main city, rather than the overspill town. This was due to one of the main reasons behind the construction of overspill estates being the aim to reduce congestion in main cities. Hence, overspill theory intends on achieving a balance between housing and employment within the overspill town.

Improved quality of living and access to amenities were of great importance to the overspill programs throughout the UK. Most tenants of overspill estates were housed there due to their prior residences having insufficient facilities or being classed as “slums”. Due to “slum clearance” programs, new building and building improvements being halted during the war, in the years after World War II, the UK authorities planned to demolish the derelict housing in congested cities. This would allow for people to have access to housing in which they would not have to share amenities or be crowded, as well as better utilise the spaces in congested cities for public development including new offices, housing, schools, shops and other facilities.

After World War II, the construction of overspill estates in existing towns was favoured, compared to further expanding urban sprawl (Cullingworth, 1960). This was to protect the green belt, which attempted to maintain accessibility to countryside areas for those living in the inner city, as well as foster agricultural land.

== Overspill estate locations ==
=== England ===
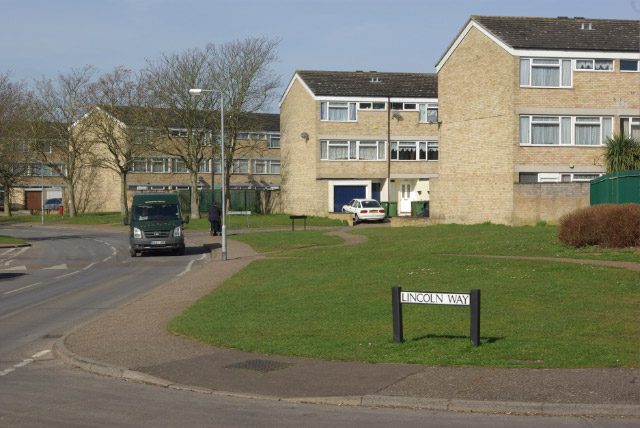
Abbey Farm housing estate, Thetford (2009)

- Bristol: Patchway, Lawrence Weston, Hartcliffe, Inns Court estate (Knowle West), Henbury, Lockleaze
- Glossop: Gamesley
- Handforth: Spath Lane
- Heald Green: Outwood Road
- Hertfordshire: Borehamwood, South Oxhey
- Heywood: Darnhill
- Hyde: Hattersley
- Knutsford: Longridge
- London Borough of Havering: Harold Hill
- London Borough of Merton: St Helier
- Liverpool: Kirkby, Halewood, Huyton, Birkenhead, Knowsley, Poulton, Seacombe, Bootle, Whiston, Runcorn
- Manchester: Wythenshawe
- Middlesbrough: Thorntree
- Middleton: Langley
- Milton Keynes (Bletchley): Lakes Estate
- Sale: Racecourse estate
- Salford: Little Hulton
- Solihull: Chelmsley Wood
- Stalybridge: Carrbrook
- Suffolk: Haverhill
- Swindon: Walcot
- Thetford: Abbey Farm
- Trafford: Partington
- Wellingborough: Hemmingwell, Queensway
- Wilmslow: Colshaw Farm
- Whitefield: Hillock

=== Scotland ===
- Glasgow: Drumchapel, Castlemilk, Easterhouse, Pollok

== Overspill populations ==
Overspill populations in the UK were mainly derived from the highly populated areas of inner-city London, Birmingham, Liverpool and Manchester. The official estimated overspill from each area was calculated by county councils and were approximately 680,000 for inner-city London, 118,000 for Birmingham, 124,000 for Liverpool and 31,000 for Manchester. These figures entail the number of people that the local authorities planned to relocate from the major cities into new towns or expanded towns, potentially to live in overspill estates. Considering the loss or damage to approximately 2,000,000 homes or buildings in London alone during the war, the approximately 680,000 residents who made up the difference between the forecasted population and the planned population would need to be re-homed elsewhere. This near 1,000,000 person figure of estimated official overspill populations does not include the estimates of the local councils in other provincial centres of the UK, which make up about 500,000 more residents planned to live in overspill areas.

== History ==
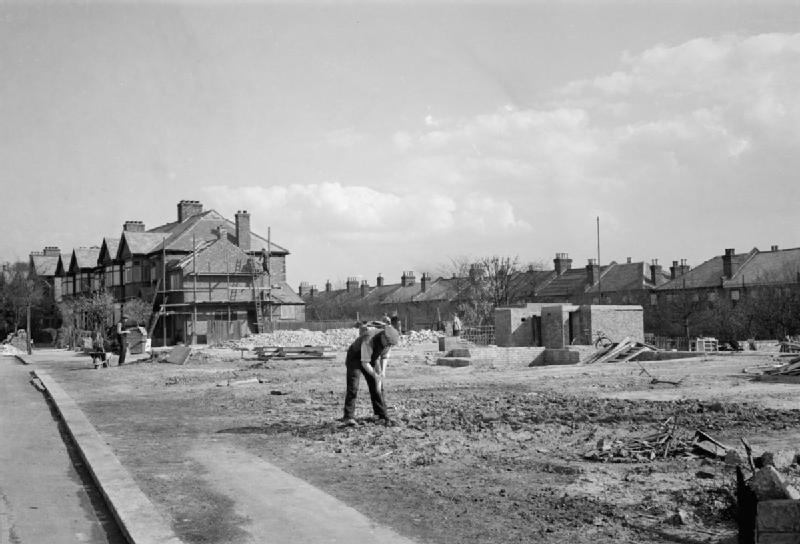
The destruction of housing from bombings on a residential London street during WWII

Slum clearance programs had been planned in the UK since before the second World War. They were put on hold due to the war and were further slowed down by the impacts that bombings had on housing. During the period of and immediately following the war, the quality of most homes in the UK were out of date. Due to a lack of development in wartime, most homes were made of brick or stone, as opposed to concrete like other modern buildings of the time, and the facilities and amenities were substandard. There were very few high-rise buildings in the UK at this time, and authorities wished to better utilise space in busy cities.

After the second World War, authorities in the UK were determined to redevelop slums and derelict housing within highly congested cities in order to create housing areas which enabled a higher standard of living for tenants. It was a method of gentrification, allowing the authorities to access war-affected areas and utilise the spaces more economically. Compulsory purchase orders were used by authorities for slum clearance, allowing local governments to purchase areas of housing or buildings which were considered to be unsafe living spaces.

Government Regional Offices and local authorities were given the duty of managing overspill at this point. The 1946 New Towns Act, implemented in the UK, was the plan to relocate hundreds of thousands of people from congested cities into newly built towns. Overspill estates and “suburban expansion” were the more prominent forms of relocation at the time compared to these new towns. Overspill seemed to be an effective method of relieving housing pressure and congestion following World War II, up until 1951. As at 1951, there were an estimated 380,000 people in need of relocation from London County alone. It was also at this point that the Conservative government of the time began to disrupt the progress of overspill estates through cuts to budgets and diminish Government Regional Offices, impeding the progression of overspill estate building. Overspill estate planning and building was further set back by the introduction of the first green belt, which negated the expansion of housing on the outskirts of busy cities.

Some overspill estates still exist as housing and others have been redeveloped into more sophisticated fixtures, such as high-rise buildings.

== Employment and overspill estates ==
The concept of overspill estates was to relocate people who were on housing lists due to their relatively poor living circumstances. In order to enable this relocation, industry and a workforce also needed to be established in overspill areas to create infrastructure and support the growing economy. As per overspill theory, the workforces which built these overspill areas would ideally be relocated from highly congested areas. This was not the case in many accounts, with workers being chosen to work on overspill estates based on their competency and workmanship value, regardless of where they lived prior to relocation. The 1953 Industrial Selection Scheme was introduced by the Ministry of Labour to encourage workers to move from the congested cities of the UK to the suburban overspill areas. The scheme allowed people to have guaranteed housing and employment in the town that they were moving to prior to their relocation, as they were registered with the Ministry of Labour through their local authorities and waitlisted for housing and employment opportunities. Many expanded towns that took on overspill populations did not have the necessary employment opportunities or resources to provide opportunities to those moving into overspill estates. Through this, the Industrial Selection Scheme attempted to ensure economic security for the expanding towns involved.

In cases where workers maintained their jobs in the city from which they have relocated, the journey to work was a newfound expense. Additionally, public transport services to and from city centres became more crowded due to this phenomenon of employees travelling out of their new overspill housing areas for work in cities. This meant that for those workers with lower incomes, their place of residence may be determined by the amount of money that they could afford to spend on travel. This created class differences between the areas where overspill estates existed, as the upper class could afford to live in and travel from more areas than the lower class.

== Social costs of overspill estates ==
For many people, the choice was between living in the slums of a city in which they desired to be, or more liveable housing on the outskirts of the city, where they did not wish to live, but had proper amenities and better quality housing. Some reasons behind families and individuals moving to overspill estates included the need for better housing, inability to acquire higher quality housing within the city they were living, forced removal through slum clearance schemes, and local authorities deeming housing to be inadequate.

First-hand accounts recall a divide between overspill estate tenants and existing residents of the overspill towns. In order to make connections with people already living in the communities, those who had relocated from the inner city often found that they had to seek out the social interactions as the existing residents were more reserved than the new tenants. Extended families were often split by some family members relocating to overspill estates while others stayed behind in the busier cities. For some new residents of overspill estates, this was isolating and they felt that the new homes were remote, compared with their previous living arrangements of being central to the city, as well as their families and friends. This more rural lifestyle was quite different to what was previously known to those who had relocated from the city slums. Though overcrowded, city slums often provided a sense of intimacy within its residents as families and kinship ties were strong, which was mostly lost for those living in overspill estates.

In terms of the original residents of the towns in which overspill estates were built, there were some reservations regarding the construction of overspill estates and town expansion. The loss of community and identity, and of historic features or landscapes due to new housing developments, were of concern to some of the towns. For those residents who moved out of the slums of busy cities, it was a different experience. There were many positive aspects of moving to overspill estates, despite the desires to live in major cities. Those living in slum-like areas of major cities often experienced substandard living spaces with overcrowding issues including shared toilets for multiple families or entire families sharing one bedroom. Compared to the cities from which they were relocated, tenants in overspill estates experienced better housing and amenities, no shared living arrangements or overcrowding in housing, and a significant reduction in general congestion of the towns.

== See also ==
- Exurb
- London overspill
- Satellite city
- Urban sprawl

Locations:

- Chelmsley Wood
- Darnhill
- Gamesley
- Hattersley
- St Helier, London
- Wythenshawe
- Pollok
- Castlemilk
