= Radburn design housing =

Housing estate planning design

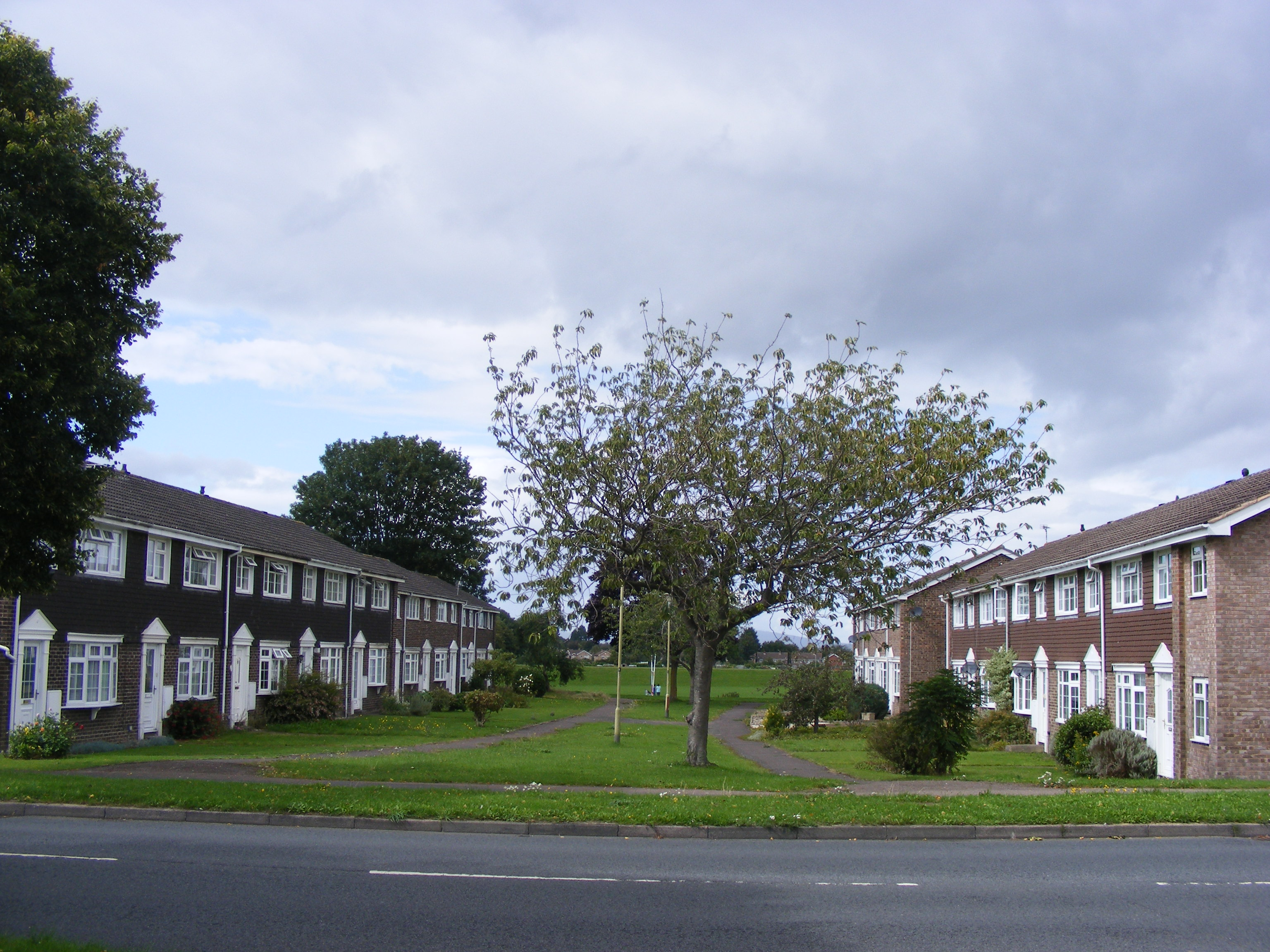
An example of Radburn design housing in Abbeydale, Gloucester, England with Redpoll Way (left) facing Redstart Way across a green space. Road access is to the rear of the houses.

Radburn design housing (also called Radburn housing, Radburn design, Radburn principle, or Radburn concept) is a concept for planned urban settlements and housing estates, based upon a design that was originally used in the community of Radburn within Fair Lawn, New Jersey, United States. The objective of the planners Clarence Stein and Henry Wright in the late 1920s was to accommodate the increasing car traffic of the time while keeping it separate from pedestrian spaces and to prevent accidents.

Some of the guidelines for the residential layout were:

- Streets are classified as main connecting roads, collector roads and residential streets.
- Different means of transport are kept separate.
- Living streets mostly take the form of culs-de-sac and turning loops.
- Intersections are replaced with overpasses and underpasses as well as T-junctions.

Backyards of homes were preferably facing the street and sometimes the fronts of homes were facing one another, over common yards.

== History ==
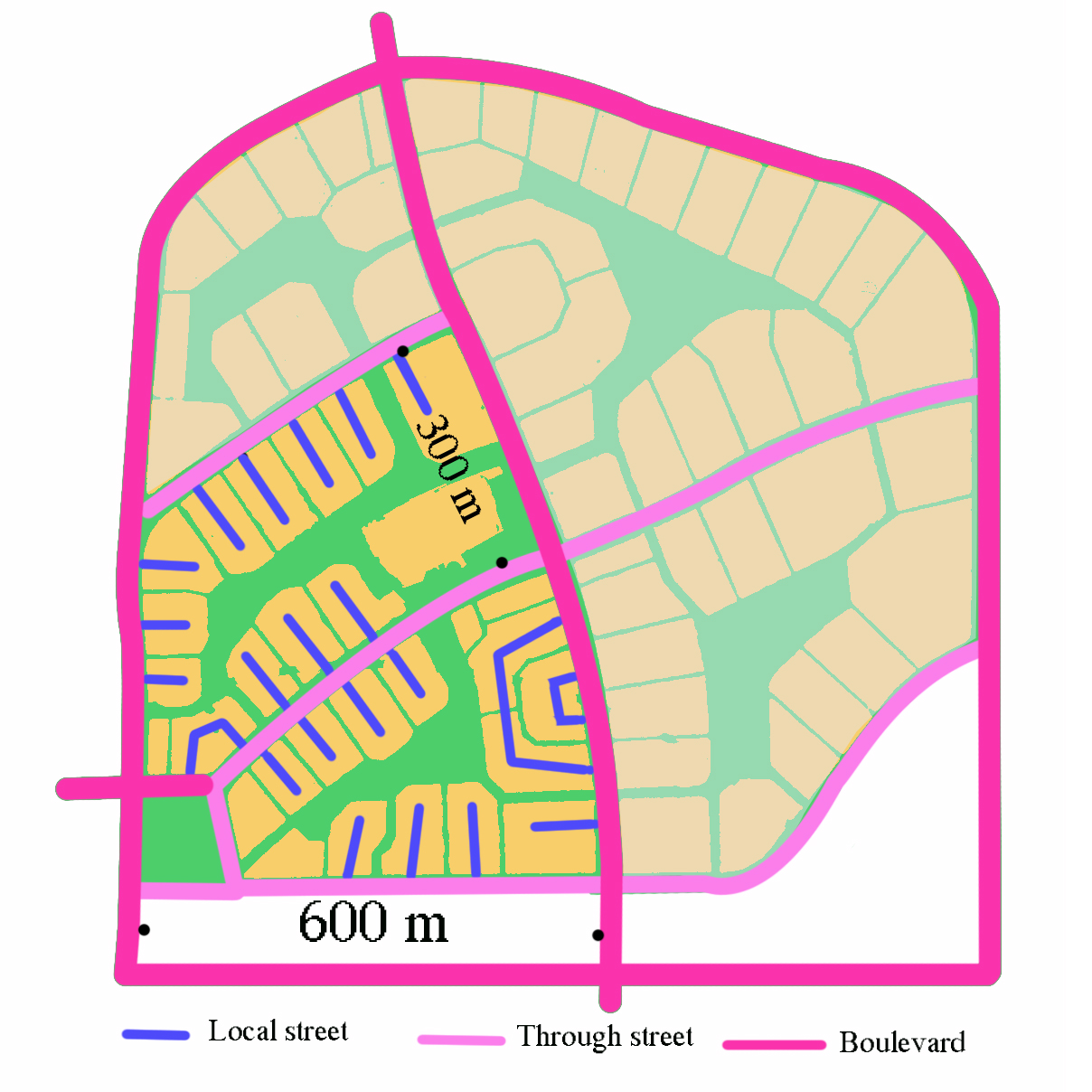
A diagram showing the street network structure of Radburn and its nested hierarchy. (The shaded area was not built)

Radburn design is an offshoot of American designs from the English garden city movement and culminated in the design of the partly-built 1929 Radburn estate.

In the United States, the Radburn idea reached its ultimate expression in Los Angeles, California, with the design and construction of Clarence Stein and Robert Alexander's Baldwin Hills Village, now known as Village Green. It opened as apartments for lease to the public on December 7, 1941. Between 1973 and 1978, it was transformed into an HOA community of 629 unit-owners. It has been designated a National Historic Landmark.

It is often referred to as an urban design experiment that is typified by failure because of its laneways being used as common entries and exits to the houses, helping to isolate communities and to encourage crime. There have been efforts to 'de-Radburn' or demolish some Radburn designed public housing areas in Australia.

When interviewed in 1998, the architect responsible for introducing the design to public housing in New South Wales, Australia, Philip Cox, was reported to have admitted with regard to a Radburn-designed estate in the suburb of Villawood: "Everything that could go wrong in a society went wrong.... It became the centre of drugs, it became the centre of violence and, eventually, the police refused to go into it. It was hell."

== Research and influence ==
The impact of Radburn's urban form on energy conservation for short, local trips was considered in a 1970 study by John Lansing of the University of Michigan. The study found Radburn's design to have important implications for energy conservation: 47% of its residents shopped for groceries on foot, compared to 23% for Reston, Virginia (another Radburn-type development but more car-oriented) and only 8% for a nearby, unplanned community.

Walt Disney was influenced by Radburn and the works of Howard in his planning for Disneyland, Walt Disney World, more specifically, his original vision of the Experimental Prototype Community of Tomorrow (concept) (EPCOT). Disney incorporated the pedestrian pathway concept into his own future city planning: "Children going to and from schools and playgrounds will use these paths, always completely safe and separated from the automobile." Other Radburn innovations that Disney would look to incorporate into his plans for EPCOT were cul-de-sacs, collector streets and common open spaces within superblocks.

== Worldwide examples ==
=== Canada ===
In Canada, the Radburn concept was used in the late 1940s and early 1950s, most notably in Halifax and Winnipeg. Westmount Subdivision in Halifax features a Radburn neighbourhood on the site of the original Halifax Municipal airport. In Winnipeg, Manitoba, there are eight distinct Radburn subdivisions:

- Wildwood Park in Fort Garry, consisting of ten bays
- Norwood Flats in St. Boniface, consisting of four bays
- Gaboury Place, an individual bay in St. Boniface
- Raymond Place, a single bay in St. Boniface
- Rillwood Place and Rillwillow Place, two bays in South St. Vital
- Millwood Meadow in Transcona
- Blairmore Gardens in Transcona
- Agincourt, Bromton, and Culloden Roads in Southdale

Today, as in Westmount in Halifax and Wildwood Park in Winnipeg, Radburn designs are considered to be desirable middle to upper-middle income neighbourhoods to reside in.

The Cité-jardin du Tricentenaire in Montreal, designed in 1942, has a Radburn layout. Only about a quarter of the plan was built before the project stopped in 1947.

Clarence Stein incorporated Radburn design principles into the plan of Alcan company town Kitimat, British Columbia in the 1950s, and the developers of Varsity Village and Braeside, subdivisions in Calgary, Alberta also used the Radburn model in the late 1960s.

=== Australia ===
In Australia, the first example of the Radburn model was used for a housing estate for workers at the Commonwealth Munitions works in St. Marys, Sydney, from 1942, the architect being Walter Bunning. The model was also used in the planning of some Canberra suburbs developed in the 1960s, in particular Charnwood, Curtin and Garran, and a small part of Hughes. In 2014, with plans for demolition of houses under the Mr Fluffy asbestos home demolition scheme being developed, it was realised that a significant number of the houses treated with loose asbestos, and thus affected, were in the Radburn areas.

The best examples of "Radburn-type development" found in Australia are in Canberra, in suburbs such as Rivett.

In Western Australia it was used in the 1970s in the southern suburb of Thornlie in what is known as the Crestwood Estate. Today the estate is considered to be a highly successful implementation of the Radburn principles. It also inspired the design of South Hedland which clustered four residential neighbourhoods around a commercial core. The design was quickly considered a failure by residents and government authorities and abandoned in 1974. Other examples include Withers Housing Estate, in South Bunbury and Karawara. Gehl stated Crestwood is not only a "perfect Radburn plan", but that it was the only entire correct Radburn plan which had ever been constructed.

It was also used in the Melbourne suburb of Doncaster East in an area known as the Milgate Park Estate. In the mid-1960s the Fountain Gate Housing Estate in Narre Warren was designed with Radburn design principles. The design was also applied in the 1970s in Minto, an outer suburb of Sydney, Australia where it was one of a number of factors leading to serious social problems on the estate. In New South Wales the then Housing Commission used the Radburn concept in numerous new estates built in the mid to late 1960s and early 1970s. Many of the medium density dwellings are being 'turned around' by lowering the road side 'rear' fence and fencing off the 'front yards that share a communal space.

The lane ways have long been a problem giving local youth a place to hide and evade motorized police patrols while launching raids into homes virtually unobserved. One benefit of this plan not often mentioned is that it allows for narrower streets in the cul-de-sacs that serve the backs of the houses. This means lower costs as less bitumen, piping and cabling is needed to service the homes. In major Radburn areas such as Mt Druitt in Sydney the current Housing NSW are selling off many of their properties as they pass their economical maintenance life and begin to cost more than they are worth. Other properties, particularly the blocks of flats often housing the less affluent and educated are being demolished and new medium density developments built in their place. These are being given to the aged and (specifically migrant) families rather than the former residents, many of whom were on parole or being reintroduced to the general community after treatment for various psychiatric disorders.

Planning for new towns built for the iron ore industry in Australia in the late 1960s was also heavily influenced by Radburn principles. They included South Hedland, Dampier, Shay Gap (now demolished) and Karratha.

=== United Kingdom ===
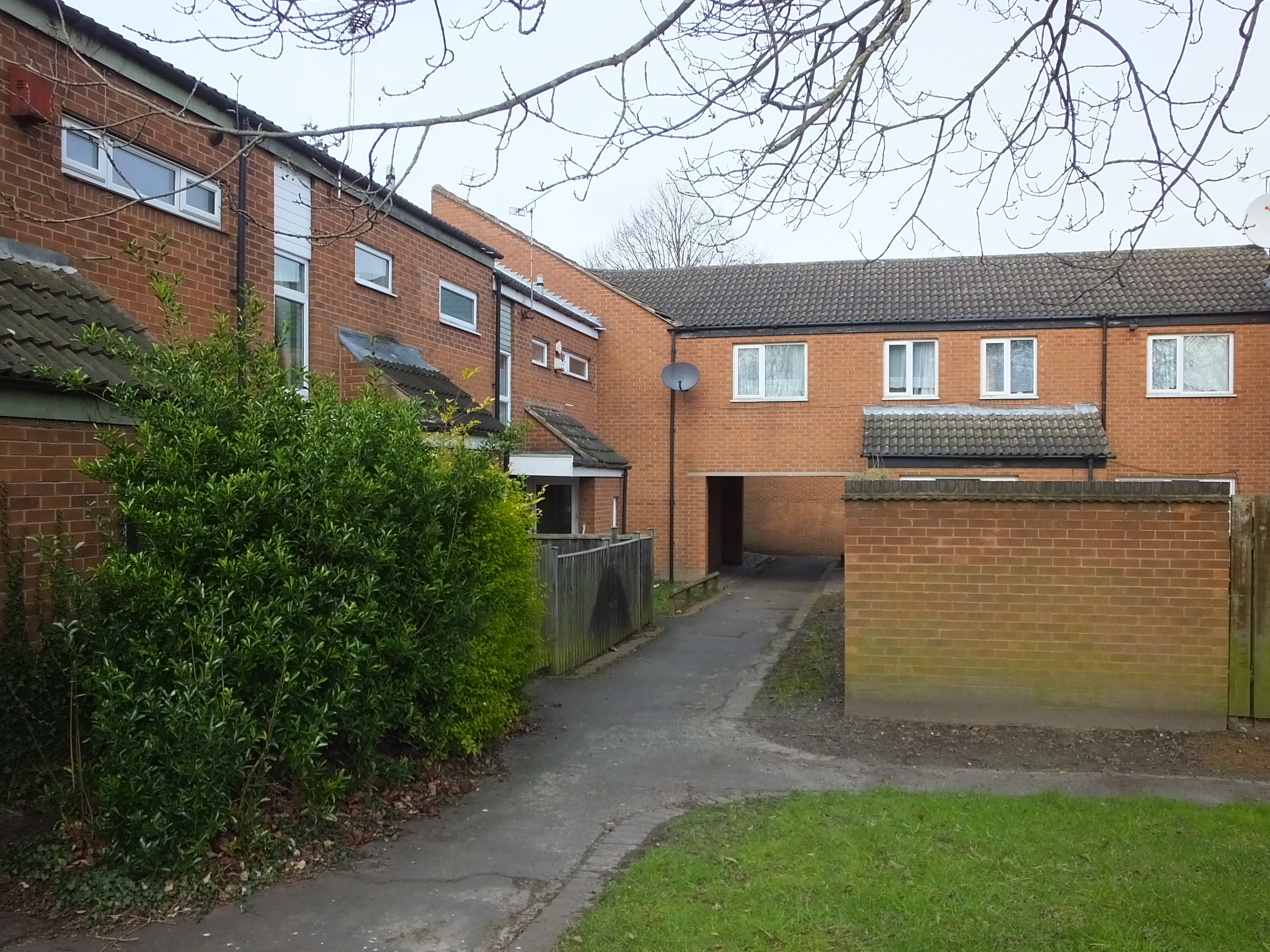
The Meadows, Nottingham, England

The Orchard Park Estate, Kingston upon Hull, UK was built beginning 1963 to the Radburn design, with several other council estates in the city following that pattern - most notably Bransholme. At Skelmersdale, UK the Radburn design layout was explicitly blamed by residents for problems of antisocial behaviour; specifically that unobserved rear parking gave areas prone to crime. In The Meadows, Nottingham the model also led to anti-social behaviour problems : Nottingham City Council has stated that "the problems associated with the layout of the New Meadows Radburn style layout... contribute to the anti-social behaviour and crime in the area." However, councillors in Kent have suggested the reputation is unfair, instead blaming negative press coverage and unfavourable views towards incomers from London following slum clearances.

In the new town of Hemel Hempstead the Grove Hill neighbourhood, one of the seven planned neighbourhoods, was partly designed using the Radburn model. The Stanshawe Estate (at one time the largest private estate in Europe), in the south-west of Yate, South Gloucestershire in England was developed using the Radburn model. Parts of Abbeydale in Gloucester surrounding the Heron Way spine road have been built using the Radburn design. Elsewhere in England the model was employed in an extension to Letchworth Garden City and in the New Town of Bracknell, particularly in the neighbourhoods of Great Hollands, Wildridings and Hanworth.

Much of the early new town of Livingston in West Lothian was built to a Radburn design plan.

In Haywards Heath the Wilmington Way Estate was designed on Radburn principles, which "resulted in an absence of properly overlooked streets and encouraged crime and anti-social behaviour". The estate was demolished and rebuilt in a different layout between 2010 and 2013 (the original layout then being considered "poor and outdated" and the buildings life-expired).

The Lakes Estate in what is now Milton Keynes (but preceded it) was designed and built by the Greater London Council as part of its London overspill developments around Bletchley. "Less than fifty years after completion the Lakes Estate ranked in the top 10 most deprived areas in England for crime, income and health deprivation according to the Index of Multiple Deprivation (IMD 2015). The urban principles of the Radburn System have contributed to a place that lacks prosperity, pride, or opportunities for healthy and happy lifestyles."

Similarly to Bletchley's Lakes Estate, both Hemmingwell and Queensway estates in the nearby town of Wellingborough, Northamptonshire were designed by Greater London Council in a Radburn-style as part of its series of London overspill developments.
