= Patricia Daley =

British human geographer and academic

- Born: Jamaica

Academic background
- Education: University of London, University of Oxford
- Thesis: Refugees and underdevelopment in Africa : the case of Barundi refugees in Tanzania (1989)

Academic work
- Discipline: Human geographer
- Sub-discipline: forced migration; political ecology; Africa
- Institutions: Dartmouth College; Loughborough University; University of Oxford; Pembroke College, Oxford; Jesus College, Oxford

Patricia Orchid Daley is a British human geographer and academic, specialising in forced migration, political violence, political ecology, and Africa. She is Professor of Human Geography of Africa at the University of Oxford and the Helen Morag Fellow and Tutor in Geography at Jesus College, Oxford.

== Early life and education ==
Daley was born In Kingston,Jamaica, and spent her early years in rural Jamaica. At the age of 10, she emigrated to England. She attended school in Hackney, London, and as a teenager lived in the Pembury Estate.

Daley was the first of her family to attend university, and studied at Middlesex Polytechnic, graduating with a Bachelor of Science (BSc) degree. She then undertook postgraduate studies at Goldsmiths College and the School of Oriental and African Studies, both part of the University of London, graduating with a Postgraduate Certificate in Education (PGCE) and a Master of Arts degree in African Studies. She then moved to the University of Oxford to study for a Doctor of Philosophy (DPhil) degree. She completed her doctorate in 1989 with a thesis titled "Refugees and underdevelopment in Africa: the case of Barundi refugees in Tanzania".

== Academic career ==
Daley previously taught at Dartmouth College, and Loughborough University. In 1996, she moved to the University of Oxford, where she was appointed University Lecturer in Human Geography and jointly to Jesus College and Pembroke College, Oxford. She is the first black woman to be appointed a lecturer at Oxford. She is now solely a Fellow of Jesus College, Oxford. She served Jesus College as Tutor for Women from 1998 to 2004, and as Tutor for Admissions from 1999 to 2002. She was the University Assessor for the 2015/2016 academic year. She was awarded a Title of Distinction as Professor of the Human Geography of Africa in September 2016. Daley served as Vice-Principal of Jesus College from 2018 to 2021 and was elected to the governing Council of the University of Oxford in 2021.

In 2017, Daley was one 24 notable individuals chosen by the University of Oxford to have their portrait painted. Daley's portrait was painted by Binny Mathews (https://www.binnymathews.com/) . It was first exhibited at a temporary exhibition and then permanently at the Examination Schools of Oxford University. The portrait commission was part of a project to augment the existing portraiture at Oxford with a greater, "diversity of background, gender and accomplishments of scholars, staff and alumni."

In 2020, Daley was announced as one of the United Kingdom's 100 most influential people of African or African Caribbean heritage, in recognition of her contribution to education by being included in the 2021 edition of the annual Powerlist. In October 2025, a portrait of Daley painted by artist Chloe Cox was hung in the dining hall of Jesus College, making Daley the second person of colour to be displayed there, after college alumnus Norman Manley.

== Selected works ==
- Daley, Patricia O. (2008). Gender and genocide in Burundi: the search for spaces of peace in the Great Lakes Region. Oxford: James Currey. ISBN 978-1847013071.
- R Elena Fiddian-Qasmiyeh, R . E. and P. O. Daley (Eds.). (2018). Routledge Handbook of South-South Relations. Routledge. ISBN 1138652008.
- Amber Murrey & Patricia Daley (2023) Learning Disobedience: Decolonizing Development Studies. Pluto Press. https://www.plutobooks.com/product/learning-disobedience/
- Patricia Daley; Ian Klinke (2025). Human Geography: A Very Short Introduction. Very Short Introductions. Oxford: Oxford University Press. ISBN 9780192869302.
