= London overspill =

Mid 20th century population movements in South East England

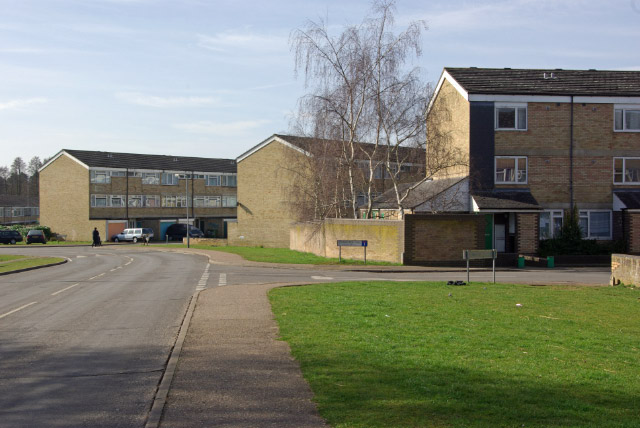
Abbey Farm was one of several housing estates built in Thetford to absorb London overspill population

London overspill communities were established as part of a government-led initiative to alleviate overcrowding in Greater London by relocating residents to other parts of England between the 1930s and 1970s. The earliest efforts focused on nearby areas in the South East, with the development of towns such as Harlow, Crawley, Basildon, and Stevenage. These initiatives were underpinned by the Greater London Plan of 1944, authored by Patrick Abercrombie, which proposed a ring of satellite towns beyond a newly defined Green Belt to decentralise population and industry.

From the 1950s, the scheme extended into East Anglia, where towns such as King's Lynn, Thetford, Haverhill, and Bury St Edmunds were expanded or redeveloped to accommodate Londoners. This regional inclusion aligned with the New Towns Act of 1946, which empowered the government to designate development areas and establish corporations to oversee their planning and growth. Peterborough, for instance, was designated a New Town in 1967 with a target population increase of 70,000.

During the 1960s and early 1970s, the programme moved into the East Midlands, particularly Northamptonshire, where towns like Northampton, Corby, and Wellingborough were developed along key transport corridors such as the M1 and A1. In its later stages, the policy reached the North West of England, with Burnley in Lancashire—over 200 miles from London—formally designated as an overspill town. This marked a shift from regional relief to a broader strategy of national population and industrial redistribution, largely implemented through the construction of council houses and the development of new towns.

== Policy development ==
The policy was initiated in the 1930s, and started in earnest after the Second World War, as a reaction to the housing shortages caused by enemy bombing and large amounts of substandard housing in the capital. This policy existed until the late 1970s, reinforced by a widespread dislike of ribbon development. Started by the London County Council, the task was completed by its successor, the Greater London Council. In the 1960s, the Location of Offices Bureau dispersed office workers away from the capital.

In 1960, the Greater London Plan proposed that over one million Londoners should be relocated from Inner London. The great majority of overspill families were relocated either to existing or new towns within south east England. As a short term expedient, viewed as regrettable, to meet an urgent need, "quasi-satellites" were created around the edge of Greater London, or close by, at South Oxhey, Debden and Harold Hill.

== List of new and expanded towns ==
In 1973, the following towns were listed, in Hansard, as London overspill:

Town	Economic planning region	Status	Anticipated numbers (1973-1979)
Andover	South East	Expanded town	
Ashford	South East	Expanded town	
Aylesbury	South East	Expanded town	
Banbury	South East	Expanded town	
Basildon	South East	New Town	16,000
Basingstoke	South East	Expanded town	
Bletchley	South East	Expanded town	
Bracknell	South East	New Town	12,000
Braintree	South East	Expanded town	
Crawley	South East	New Town	8,000
Farnborough	South East	Expanded town	
Harlow	South East	New Town	5,000
Hastings	South East	Expanded town	
Hatfield	South East	New Town	1,000
Hemel Hempstead	South East	New Town	4,000
Houghton Regis	South East	Expanded town	
Letchworth	South East	Expanded town	
Milton Keynes	South East	New Town	69,000
Sandy	South East	Expanded town	
Stevenage	South East	New Town	4,000
Welwyn Garden City	South East	New Town	2,000
Witham	South East	Expanded town	
Bury St Edmunds	East Anglia	Expanded town	
Haverhill	East Anglia	Expanded town	
Huntingdon	East Anglia	Expanded town	
King's Lynn	East Anglia	Expanded town	
Long Melford	East Anglia	Expanded town	
Mildenhall	East Anglia	Expanded town	
Peterborough	East Anglia	New Town	47,000
St Neots	East Anglia	Expanded town	
Sudbury	East Anglia	Expanded town	
Thetford	East Anglia	Expanded town	
Bodmin	South West	Expanded town	
Plymouth	South West	Expanded town	
Swindon	South West	Expanded town	
Corby	East Midlands	New Town	8,000
Grantham	East Midlands	Expanded town	
Northampton	East Midlands	New Town	55,000
Wellingborough	East Midlands	Expanded town	10,000
Gainsborough	East Midlands	Expanded town	
Burnley	North West	Expanded town	

== See also ==
- Overspill estate
- Niethrop and Bretch hill, Banbury
- Ruscote and Hardwick, Banbury
- Hemmingwell, Wellingborough
- Queensway, Wellingborough
