= Abbeydale and Abbeymead =

Suburbs of Gloucester, England

Coordinates: 51.848°N 2.198°W

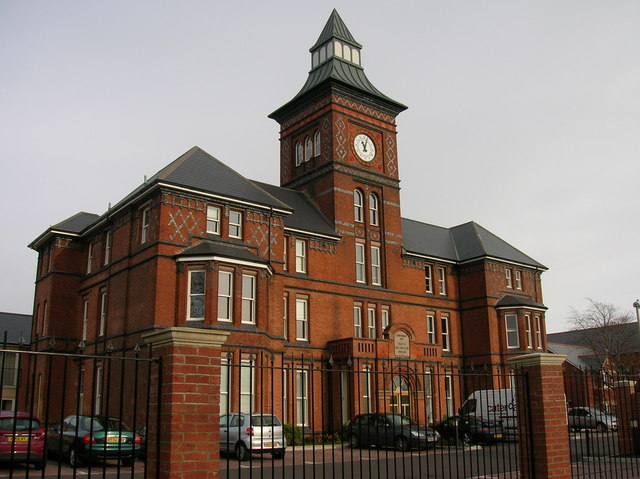
Clock Tower in Abbeymead, converted into flats

Abbeydale and Abbeymead are modern suburbs of the city of Gloucester in the county of Gloucestershire, England. They lie approximately 3 miles south-east of the city centre, and are bounded by the suburbs of Coney Hill to the north west, Barnwood and Hucclecote to the north and north east, Matson to the south west and the M5 motorway to the south and east. Mostly connected with segregated bicycle paths into Gloucester city along Metz Way. The village of Upton St Leonards is directly across the M5 motorway.

The two suburbs are contiguous and share many amenities but there is a clear definition of where Abbeydale ends and Abbeymead begins.

== History ==
Most of the Abbeydale area was green fields until around 1970, when the Heron Park development was constructed by Heron Homesteads. At that stage, it was officially known as "The Land to the East"

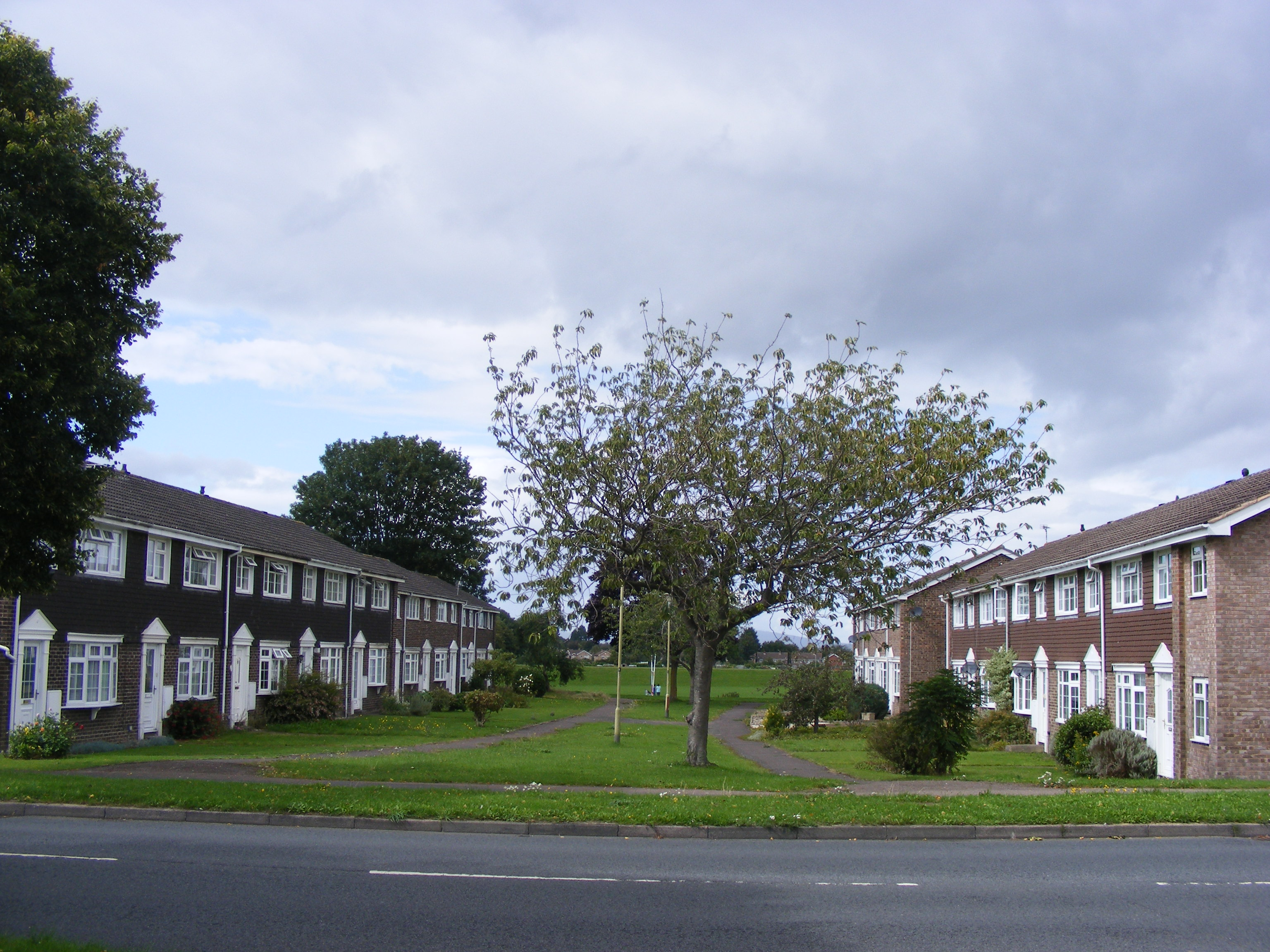
An example of Radburn design housing in Abbeydale, with Redpoll Way (left) facing Redstart Way across a green space. Road access is to the rear of the houses.

The first two-thirds of Heron Park appears to have been designed in accordance with the Radburn model. It consists of loops and cul-de-sacs radiating from a central spine road, Heron Way, giving access to the rear of the houses where there are garages and hard-standings. The houses face each other across interconnecting pathways and green spaces, so that pedestrians are largely separated from traffic. In keeping with the developer's brand name, the streets were named after British birds. The area is almost identical to a Heron development in Yate, South Gloucestershire which was built around the same time and even has its own Heron Way. Later parts of Heron Park, such as Hawthorne and Bittern Avenues completed around 1981, were not built to the Radburn model. Because Fieldfare linked the Radburn-built houses and conventional houses of the new part, those houses in Swift and Woodcock which faced onto Fieldfare were re-named and re-numbered as Fieldfare.

In 1975, contracts were signed for the construction of Heron Primary School, which opened in 1977.

The Glevum Way Shopping Centre opened in 1981, with a Safeway supermarket and a handful of small shops. Over the following few years, a community centre, a doctor's surgery, a pub (the Ridge & Furrow, operated by Courage) and a veterinary clinic were built beside the centre. In the 1980s, the Community Centre was built, initially without the current sports facilities. On the evening of 4 August 1983, the Safeway store was evacuated when fire broke out, severely damaging the building. In 2005, the shopping complex was demolished to make way for a new, larger Morrisons store, but using the plans which Safeway already had building permission for before being taken over by Morrisons. The pub was closed by Morrisons around 2012, to make way for a petrol station, which was turned down by planners, and has since reopened.

The second half of what became known as Abbeydale, was started around 1976, with further development on land between Heron Park and the M5. These homes were constructed by the Robert Hitchins and Glevum Estates building companies and are distinguished from Heron Park by their more conventional layout and different house designs. Most houses face the road, have front driveways and garages, and are similar to those built by the same companies in Quedgeley. These developments, which lie either side of Wheatway, were completed around 1982-1986. When the road, Wheatway, was built, it bisected The Wheatridge and the part nearest the M5 motorway was called The Wheatridge East. This newer part of Abbeydale is separated from the older Heron Park by The Wheatridge - a lane of former farmworkers' cottages and larger country houses leading from Painswick Road (B4073). Around 1983, plots of land at the top of The Wheatridge were sold for the construction of individually designed homes and a small housing development. A small church, Christchurch, Abbeydale, was built and opened in 1995.

From 1986, further housing development began on farmland between Abbeydale and Barnwood and became known as Abbeymead. It was connected to Abbeydale with the construction of its main artery, Abbeymead Avenue, designated the Eastern Radial Road, a high speed roadway into Gloucester, which was to have had a flyover across Eastern Avenue; never built. To cater for road safety, with an original speed limit of 40 mph, no houses on Abbeymead Avenue actually face directly on the road. Smaller, piecemeal developments have continued to be added, turning Abbeymead into one of the more populous suburbs of the city. Lobleys Drive is an important spine road off Abbeymead Avenue, leading, over the M5, into Coopers Edge and Gloucester Business Park. However, despite being required to be an adopted road by 2008, through the business park, as a result of a Section 106 agreement, it currently remains a private road.

== Local government ==
For administrative purposes, the suburb is covered by four electoral wards. The majority of residents live in the Abbey ward, the north eastern area is in the Hucclecote ward, and the northern area is in the Barnwood ward. The councillors currently representing Abbeymead^{A} are as follows, as of June 2026:

- Abbeydale Ward: Andrew Gravells (Conservative) ; Louise Walker (Conservative)
- Abbeymead ward: Kate Hyland (Conservative); Laura Brooker (Conservative);
- Barnwood ward: Ashlet Bowkett (Liberal Democrat); Joshua Taylor (Liberal Democrat)
- Hucclecote ward: Alwin Wiederhold (Liberal Democrat) ; Declan Wilson (Liberal Democrat)

== Amenities ==
The biggest suburban shopping outlet, next to Heron Way (Abbeydale) has five shops in addition to the Morrisons supermarket, Taylors (Estate Agents), Ruby Cantonese/Dave's Fish & Chip shop, Coral Betting Shop, plus Sue Ryder Care charity shop. Adjacent is the Ridge & Furrow Pub, Hadwen Doctors' Surgery/Pharmacy and Veterinary Surgery. Part of the shopping complex includes a community centre with an all-weather pitch. Straight across Abbeymead Avenue are several other small retail units.

Heron Primary School in Heron Way and Abbeymead Primary School in Abbeymead Avenue are the only two schools in the area and both serve 4- to 11-year-olds. Near to the latter is also a children's playground. By Abbeymead School is another pub, called The Turmut Hoer, and a small row of shops, a Tesco Express, hairdresser, Michael Tuck Estate and Letting Agents, Gloucester Grill, and The Polash Indian restaurant.

Among Abbeymead's many open spaces lies a skateboarding amenity, Clock Tower Park and, further away, a local nature reserve at Hucclecote Meadows, which has been designated as a Site of Special Scientific Interest (SSSI).

As the area is now virtually fully built up, it is unlikely that Abbeydale/Abbeymead will see any real expansion. Large-scale residential development is in progress, however, at Brockworth, on the other side of the M5 motorway, linked from Abbeymead Avenue by Lobleys Drive. Nearby is also a large business park, on the site of the old Brockworth Aerodrome, with a large Tesco Supermarket, Whittle Inn pub, Premier Inn Hotel and several other shops.

The whole area is served by several frequent bus routes operated by Stagecoach West, the 2, 2A, 8 and 13 and more recently the 66z

== Sister cities ==
- Shuklaganj, India

== Notes ==
- ^ Note A: Gloucester City Council
