= Ronan Point =

Partly collapsed tower block in London

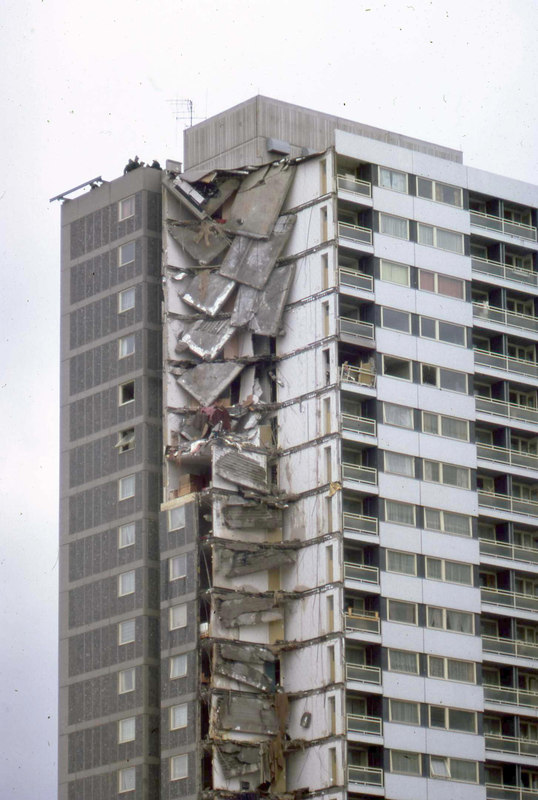
- Ronan Point, following the gas explosion
- Interactive map of the Ronan Point area

General information
- Status: Demolished
- Type: Tower block
- Location: Canning Town, London
- Coordinates: 51.5129°N 0.0215°E
- Construction started: 1966
- Completed: 1968
- Demolished: 1986
- Owner: Newham Council

Technical details
- Structural system: Large panel system
- Material: Prefabricated pre-cast concrete
- Floor count: 22

Design and construction
- Main contractor: Taylor Woodrow Anglian
- Known for: Partial collapse following gas explosion

Ronan Point was a 22-storey tower block in Canning Town in Newham, East London, that partially collapsed on 16 May 1968, only two months after it opened. A gas explosion blew out some load-bearing walls, causing the collapse of one entire corner of the building; four people died and 17 were injured. The nature of the failure (caused by both poor design and poor construction) led to a loss of public confidence in high-rise residential buildings, and major changes in British building regulations resulted.

== Construction ==
Ronan Point was part of the wave of tower blocks built in the 1960s as cheap, affordable prefabricated housing for inhabitants of West Ham and other areas of London. The building was named after Deputy Mayor Harry Ronan, former chairman of London Borough of Newham's Housing Committee. The tower was built by Taylor Woodrow Anglian using the large panel system building technology, which involves casting large concrete sections off-site and bolting them together to construct the building. The precast system used was the Danish Larsen & Nielsen system.

Construction started in 1966 and was completed on 11 March 1968.

== Collapse ==
At approximately 5:45 am on 16 May 1968, resident Ivy Hodge went into her kitchen in flat 90, a corner flat on the 18th floor of the building, and lit a match to light the gas stove for a cup of tea. The match sparked a gas explosion that blew out the load-bearing flank wall, which had been supporting the four flats above. The flank wall fell away, leaving the floors above Hodge's living room and bedroom unsupported, causing their collapse. Falling floor slabs from Hodge's floor and the floors above stacked onto the floors below, causing a progressive collapse of all of the floors of the living room portions of the south-east units of the building.

The building had just opened, and three of the four flats immediately above Hodge's were unoccupied. Four of the 260 residents died immediately and seventeen were injured and taken to hospital, of whom three were detained including a young mother who was stranded on a narrow ledge when the rest of her living room disappeared. Hodge survived, having been knocked unconscious in her kitchen by the blast. Leaking gas had collected in the hallway outside her kitchen, and the largest area of overpressure from the gas explosion's blast wave occurred at this concentration of gas in the hallway, causing the highest pressures of the blast wave to travel outward to the exterior flank wall uninterrupted. The existing overpressure in the kitchen as a result of the gas explosion's origin there blunted the higher overpressure caused by the hallway explosion, leaving the walls of the kitchen intact and sparing Hodge's life. Hodge's stove had also remained intact, and was taken to her new address.

The gas leak was determined to have been caused by a cracked nut connecting the building's gas line to Hodge's stove, which was believed to have cracked due to being overtightened at the time of installation. The force of the blast also had lifted upward a portion of the ceiling in Hodge's unit (i.e., the unit above's floor slab) causing loss of the gravity load between the floor slab and flank wall necessary to keep the flank wall anchored to the floor slab. Further, a subsequent investigation determined that mechanical elements of the floor slab/flank wall connection were not properly designed to account for the effects of gravity load changes due to lateral forces such as high winds or explosions. In the immediate aftermath of the collapse, the managing director of Taylor Woodrow Anglian denied that the collapse was related to a failure of the building itself.

The four tenants who died were Thomas and Pauline Murrell, who lived in flat 110, above flat 90 on the 22nd floor (the highest level), and Thomas McClusky and Edith Bridgestook who lived in flat 85, directly below it on the 17th floor. The Murrells had refused their allocated flat eight times, ultimately agreeing to live there only because their former home had been condemned. The low death toll is thought to be due to the early hour of the collapse, when most residents were in their bedrooms, rather than in their living-rooms that were affected by the collapse. The day after the collapse saw three residents dead, three unrecovered, and three hospitalised. The three tenants detained in hospital were Ivy Hodge, in whose flat the explosion occurred and who was suffering from minor shock and burns, Brenda Maughun, who was suffering from a dislocated shoulder, a broken tibia and three broken teeth, and Ann Carter. Ann Carter died in hospital two weeks later, although her death was not directly related to the accident.

== Griffiths inquiry ==
In the immediate aftermath of the collapse, the government commissioned an inquiry, led by Hugh Griffiths, QC. It reported on dangers caused by pressure on the walls from explosion, wind, or fire, finding that although the design had complied with the current regulations, the following recommendations should be implemented:

- Gas supplies should be disconnected from existing tall buildings until they have been strengthened
- Consideration should be given to a requirement to notify the gas board of new gas installations
- Consideration should be given to improving ventilation in high blocks
- The regulations for the storage of explosive materials in high blocks should be reviewed
- All blocks over six storeys should be appraised by a structural engineer
- Where necessary high blocks should be strengthened
- Designers of new tall blocks should design them so they are not susceptible to progressive collapse
- Designers should have regard to recent research on frequency and duration of high wind speeds etc.
- Designers should have regard to the effects of fire on the structural behaviour of the building

== Rebuilding and later demolition ==
Ronan Point was partly rebuilt after the explosion, using strengthened joints designed to deal with those issues, and the building regulations were altered to ensure that similar designs would not be permitted in the future. However, public confidence in the safety of residential tower blocks was irreparably shaken. Many residents, even those in unaffected flats, refused to return after the evacuation.

Sam Webb, an architect who had given evidence to the Griffiths inquiry, predicted that after approximately 15 years, Ronan Point would develop structural problems and collapse. Webb's concerns eventually led the council to evacuate the building in 1984, 16 years after the collapse, and then to demolish it in 1986 in a methodical manner (rather than, for example, using explosives). When this was done, the extent of the defects found shocked even some of the activists, including Webb himself. It was discovered that most of the mechanical connections between floor slabs and flank walls had not been attached properly during construction. Significant corner-cutting had also been undertaken during the construction, with bolts often missing. Holes that should have been filled with concrete were found stuffed with rubbish and newspaper. On the lower floors, cracks were found in the concrete where it had been point-loaded, and it was alleged that the extra pressure on those points during a high wind (such as during the Great Storm of 1987, barely a year after the demolition) would soon have led to building collapse.

== Effect on legislation ==
The partial collapse of Ronan Point led to major changes in building regulations. The first of these came with the 5th Amendment to the Building Regulations in 1970. These are now embodied in Part A of the Building Regulations and cover "Disproportionate Collapse". They require that "the building shall be constructed so that in the event of an accident the building will not suffer collapse to an extent disproportionate to the cause". They specifically cover pressures which may be caused for example by wind forces, explosions (either internal or external), or vehicle incursions, and note that seismic design may occasionally be required.

Immediately after the publication of the report, the Government brought out interim measures to ensure the safety and integrity of buildings in the event of an explosion. All new buildings of over five storeys constructed after November 1968 were required to be able to resist an explosive force of 34 kPa (4.9 psi). Existing buildings were allowed to resist an explosive force of 17 kPa (2.5 psi), provided that the gas supply was removed and flats were refitted for electric cooking and heating.

Many other jurisdictions, including the US, have since amended their building codes to require that buildings subject to explosions or other accidents will not collapse to an extent disproportionate to the cause.

Two days after the Grenfell Tower fire in 2017, John Knapton, emeritus professor of structural engineering at Newcastle University, claimed that regulations which came into force in 1971, following lessons learned from Ronan Point, had improved building structural strength in such a way as to prevent the collapse of the Grenfell Tower, which was built in 1974.

== Effect on housing ==
In 1985, the Building Research Establishment published a report entitled "The Structure of Ronan Point and other Taylor Woodrow – Anglian buildings" to advise local councils and building owners on checking the structural stability of their blocks. Southwark Council confirmed in 2017 that strengthening work ordered after Ronan Point may not have been carried out on the Ledbury Estate, after structural weaknesses were found that led to the evacuation of four tower blocks.

Within a couple of decades of the collapse of Ronan Point, the public's lack of confidence in the construction technique used at Ronan Point, together with the social problems within such developments, led to the demolition of many tower blocks. In particular, the construction technique involved metal bolts which expand when they rust and crack the concrete around them. In 2018, it was reported that two tower blocks on the Broadwater Farm estate in Tottenham, Tangmere House and Northholt House, were structurally unsound and could collapse catastrophically if there is a gas explosion or if a vehicle collides with the base. Both were evacuated, demolished, and as of May 2026, new housing construction planned to begin in June 2026. Other buildings in Broadwater Farm had less serious problems.

== Legacy ==
In May 2018, 50 years after the partial collapse, Ronan Point was the subject of an experimental documentary film, And Then We Heard Shouts and Cries, by artist Ricky Chambers. Chambers' grandparents and mother had lived in flat 87 on the 18th floor of the tower block at the time of the gas explosion.

== See also ==
- Ballymun flats
- List of structural failures and collapses
- Grenfell Tower fire
- Lakanal House fire
- Structural robustness

== Bibliography ==
A number of books have covered the collapse of Ronan Point, including Collapse: Why Buildings Fall Down by Phil Wearne ISBN 0-7522-1817-4. This was written to accompany the television series of the same name shown on Channel 4 in early 2000.

Building Research Establishment reports:

- The Structure of Ronan Point and other Taylor Woodrow-Anglian Buildings 1985 ISBN 0-85125-342-3
- Large panel system dwellings: preliminary information on ownership and condition 1986 ISBN 0-85125-186-2
- The structural adequacy and durability of large panel system dwellings 1987 ISBN 0-85125-250-8
