= Darnhill =

Area of Heywood, Greater Manchester, England

Coordinates: 53.5874°N 2.2439°W

Darn Hill
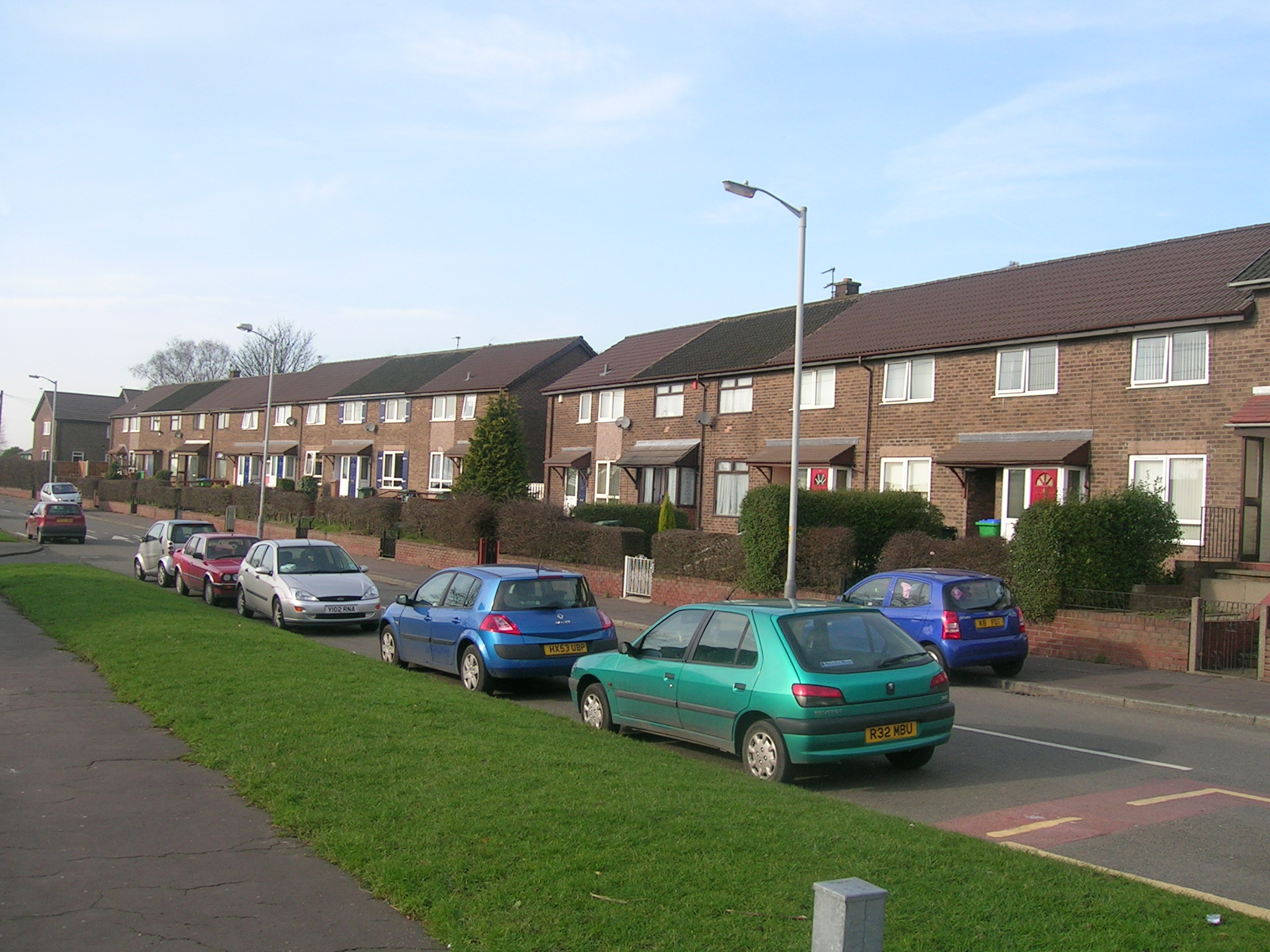
- Argyle Street, Darnhill

- Location within Greater Manchester
- OS grid reference: SD838101
- Metropolitan borough: Rochdale
- Metropolitan county: Greater Manchester
- Region: North West
- Country: England
- Sovereign state: United Kingdom
- Post town: HEYWOOD
- Postcode district: OL10
- Police: Greater Manchester
- Fire: Greater Manchester
- Ambulance: North West

Darnhill (or Darn Hill as recorded by the Ordnance Survey) is an area of Heywood, a town within the Metropolitan Borough of Rochdale, in Greater Manchester, England. In the 20th century, Darnhill was chosen as the location for a planned overspill housing estate for Manchester, to alleviate quality housing shortages in that city. The Darnhill council estate is no longer overseen by Manchester City Council, but by the Guinness Trust Housing Association.

== History ==
During World War II, Manchester was heavily bombed. Lacking space the Council bought land from neighbouring boroughs to build municipal housing for its bombed out residents. Although these estates were in boroughs outside of Manchester, residents still paid rent and rates to Manchester City Council. The Darnhill Estate began construction in the early 1960s with the first family moving in in 1962. Eventually 5,000 people moved to the estate, mainly from the Collyhurst and Miles Platting area of the city.

In 1998, after consultation with residents, Manchester City Council, transferred its interests in the Darnhill Estate to the Guinness Trust.

== Geography ==
Darnhill is located in the southwestern part of Heywood, between the River Roch (to the north) and East Lancs Railway (to the south). It is close to the Metropolitan Borough of Rochdale's boundary with the Metropolitan Borough of Bury.

== Education ==
Our Ladys and St. Pauls RC is the only school on the estate at the present time. Darnhill Primary School was closed in 2007. Heywood Community High School closed on 31 June 2010.
