= Ledbury Estate =

Housing estate in Peckham, London

Coordinates: 51.480449°N 0.063070°W

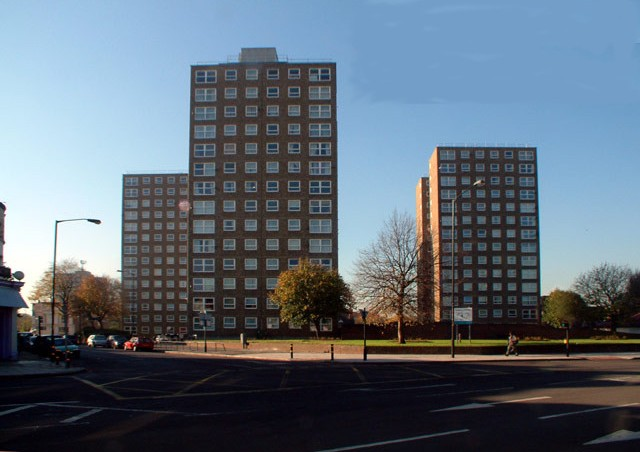
- Interactive map of Ledbury Estate

General information
- Location: Peckham

Construction
- Constructed: 1968-70
- Authority: Greater London Council
- Style: Large-panel-system

Other information
- Governing body: London Borough of Southwark

The Ledbury Estate is a large estate of social housing, in Peckham in the London Borough of Southwark. The estate is just south of the Old Kent Road, part of the A2 4 kilometres (2.5 mi) from both Tower Bridge and the Elephant & Castle it is adjacent to land used by George Livesey for the South London Gasworks.

It was found, while making fire safety checks in 2017 in the wake of the Grenfell Tower fire, that the blocks had not been strengthened, as required after the Ronan Point collapse in 1968.

== History ==
The estate comprises houses and maisonettes on Hoyland Close, Commercial Way, Bird in the Bush Road, Naylor Road, Windspoint Drive, Ethnard Road and Pencraig Way. There are four thirteen-storey H-shaped tower blocks: Bromyard House, Sarnesfield House, Peterchurch House and Skenfrith House.

The Ledbury blocks were constructed between 1968 and 1970 using a method called large panel system, in which giant concrete sections were bolted together on site. There was no supporting frame. Many companies produced these building systems, including Tracoba, Camus and Sectra in France, and Jespersen, Skarne and Larsen-Nielsen in Scandinavia. British construction firms such as John Laing and Taylor Woodrow-Anglian used these systems, working for local housing authorities to quickly produce the new homes that were a political necessity in the 1960s.

It was this technique was used at Ronan Point which partly collapsed in 1968 following a gas explosion.

The blocks were constructed for Greater London Council using the Larsen-Nielsen method. They are 13 storeys high and contain 56 flats, all except those on the top floor accessible by a lift and stairs, the top floor only by stairs. One lift serves the even numbered floors, and a second lift serves floor 12 and the odd numbered floors. They are the form of an H, there are two flats on each of the long (28m) walls connected by a narrow central service area where one finds the lifts and stairs and a disused drying room. The exterior concrete panels are faced with Norfolk flint. The design is in the Scandinavian point block genre, as found on the Alton Estate rather than following a pure Le Corbusier brutalist (concrete brut) genre. In front of the flats is a piazza, which forms the roof to a block of subterranean garages which in 2016 were unused.

There are other low rise buildings on the estate constructed by the Larsen-Nielsen method.

== Construction concerns and fire safety ==
Residents have been raising concerns for a number of years regarding cracks beginning to appear in the walls in the tower blocks. The Ledbury Action Group was formed to voice these concerns to Southwark Council, but that little was done until the aftermath of the Grenfell Tower Fire.

After the Grenfell fire, authorities across Great Britain performed additional fire safety checks on all social housing tower blocks. In a block like Skenfrith House, this concentrated on fire doors, evacuation procedures and compartmentalisation: could a fire in one flat be contained for one hour without breaching into an adjacent flat. Prior to this process - as far back as 2010, some residents had already complained of cracks in the concrete that would allow a piece of paper to pass to the flat above. Following residents insistence post-Grenfell Ove Arup, was then commissioned by Southwark Council to conduct a structural report. After ARUP initially reported to residents in July 2017 that the 'cracks were not a structural concern' a later report in August 2017 recommended the immediate removal of piped gas in the blocks.

Southwark Council announced that strengthening work ordered after Ronan Point may not have been carried out. The gas supply to each block was severed until remedial work had been done. Residents remained in their flats but without heating, hot water and cooking facilities.

A further ARUP reported in November 2017 confirmed that the buildings had not been strengthened in the early seventies.

== Community centre and studios ==
The estate is within the Old Kent Road Opportunity Area. A scheme is in place to convert the disused garages into a community and training centre with space for small workshops.

== See also ==
- Grenfell Tower fire
- List of large council estates Southwark
