= Kingsway, Wellingborough =

Housing area of Wellingborough, Northamptonshire, England

Coordinates: 52.2900625°N 0.7048534°W

Kingsway
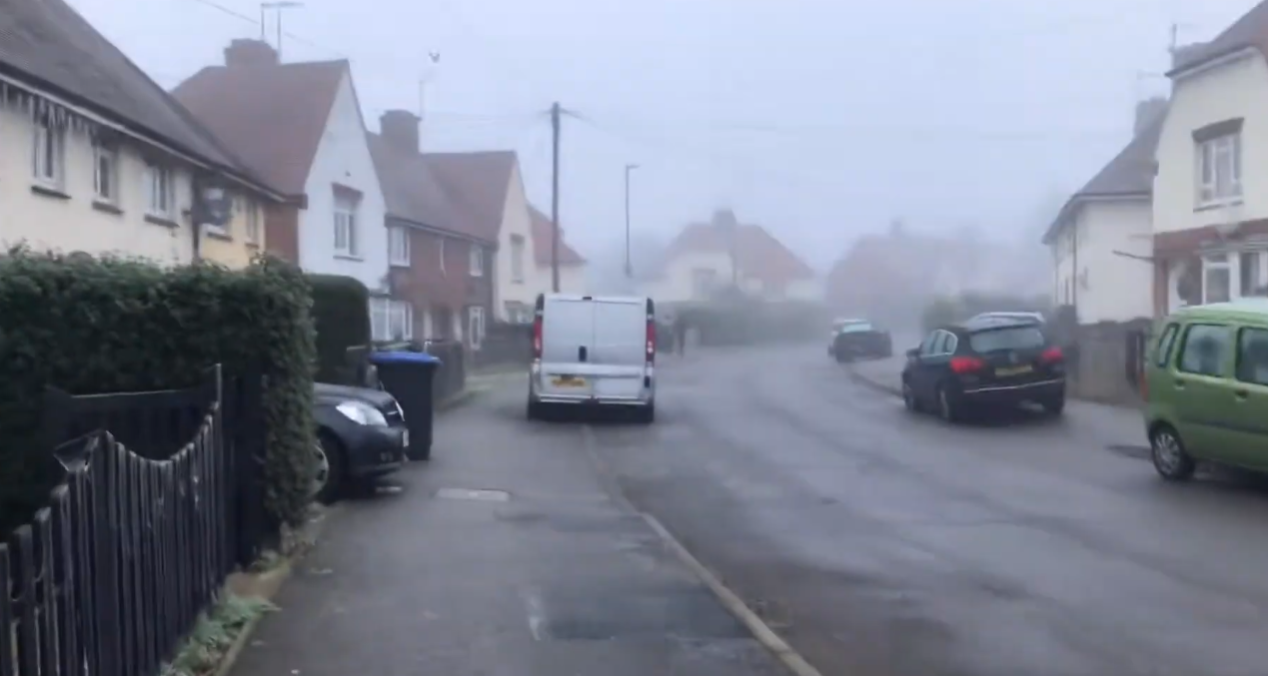
- Jubilee Crescent

- Location within Northamptonshire
- Population: 8,239 (2011 Census)
- OS grid reference: SP8843366559
- Civil parish: Wellingborough
- Unitary authority: North Northamptonshire
- Ceremonial county: Northamptonshire
- Region: East Midlands
- Country: England
- Sovereign state: United Kingdom
- Post town: WELLINGBOROUGH
- Postcode district: NN8
- Dialling code: 01933
- Police: Northamptonshire
- Fire: Northamptonshire
- Ambulance: East Midlands
- UK Parliament: Wellingborough

Kingsway is a suburb of Wellingborough, Northamptonshire. The estate's main road after which the area is named runs east–west between Doddington Road and Northampton Road, and is situated south-west of Wellingborough town centre.

With a population of 8,239 at the 2011 census, the area occupies a large section of southern Wellingborough.

== History ==
Construction of the Kingsway estate began in the 1930s, but was not completed until later into the 20th century as a result of the Second World War.

Community-based amenities were developed alongside housing during the completion of the estate, with the Kingsway Centre being established on land leased in 1967 to the National Association of Boys Clubs.

== Governance ==
As of November 2025, Kingsway falls within the Croyland and Swanspool ward, and is represented on Wellingborough Town Council by Martin Griffiths and Chris Munday (Reform UK). The ward forms part of the parliamentary constituency of Wellingborough and the MP is Gen Kitchen (Labour).

== Shops and amenities ==
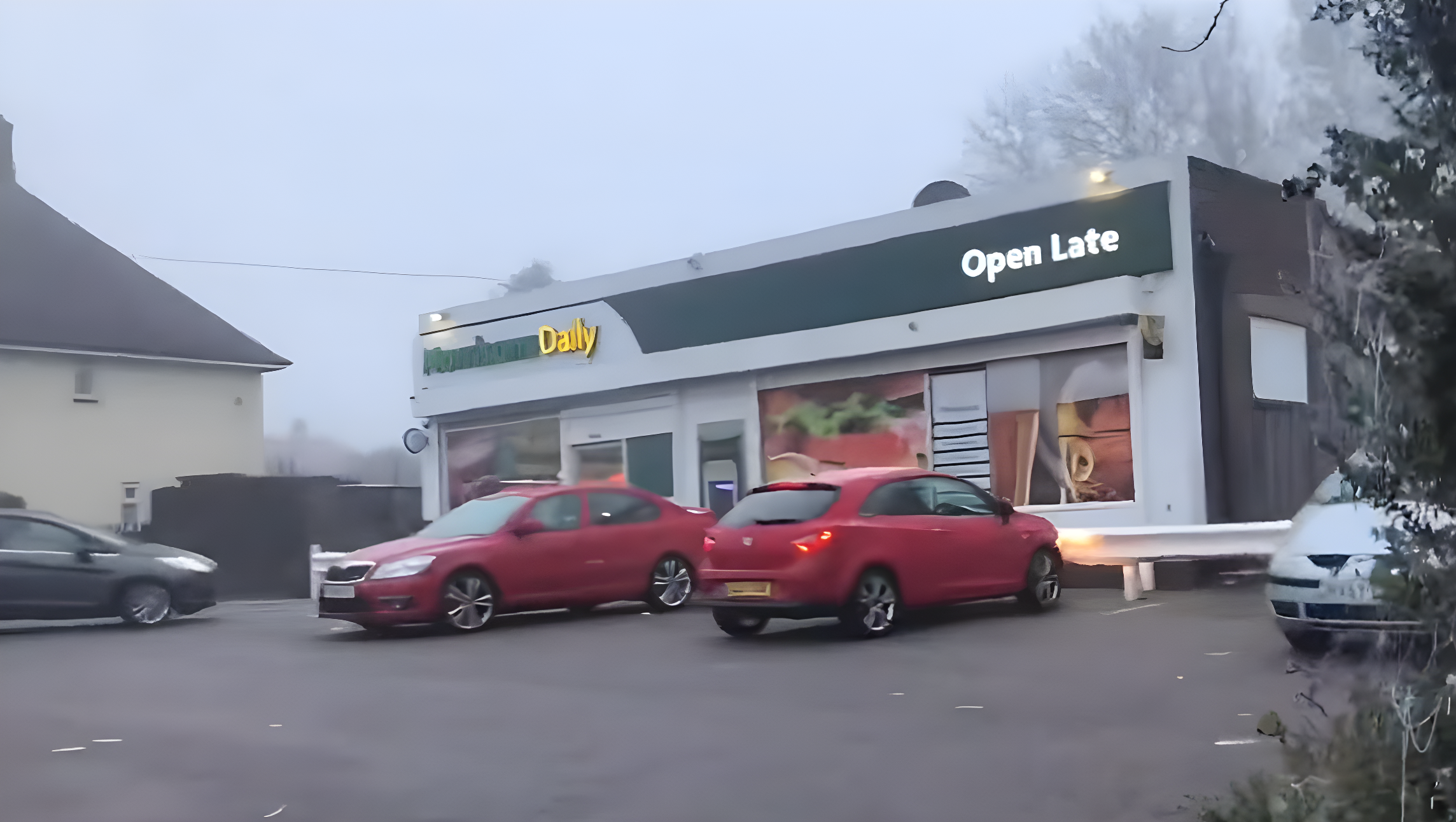
Kingsway Morrisons

As of March 2026, Kingsway's shops include a Budgens, a Morrisons Daily, two Chinese restaurants and a pharmacy, along with various other convenience stores. The Kingsway Centre, as well as both Saint Andrew’s Church and Wellingborough Methodist Church offer regular community based events.

== Culture ==
Every year Kingsway's Croyland Park hosts Party In The Park. The festival takes place on the first weekend of July, and features live music acts, rides and food stalls.

== Public transport ==
Kingsway is connected to Wellingborough town centre via the W3 bus service provided by CommMiniBus. Additionally, the Stagecoach Midlands X46, X47 and X4 services run at each end of the estate, accessible from Northampton Road and Doddington Road. This connects the estate to places like Northampton, Rushden, Kettering, Corby and Raunds.

== Education ==
State funded schools:

- Croyland Primary School
- Our Lady's Catholic School
- Warwick Academy
- Wrenn School (Doddington Road site)

== Notable people ==
- Peter Murphy, lead vocalist of gothic rock band Bauhaus grew up on the estate, with the band playing their first gig at the estate's now demolished Cromwell pub on New Year's Eve 1978.
- Thom Yorke, lead singer of alternative rock band Radiohead spent his early years living on Kingsway's Jubilee Crescent.

== See also ==
- Hemmingwell
- Queensway
