= Location of Offices Bureau =

The Location of Offices Bureau was set up in April 1963 by the United Kingdom government as part of its policy of dispersing office jobs from the centre of London.

Developers wishing to build new offices in London required permits from the bureau. The need for such permits lasted throughout the 1970s.

It was claimed that between 1963 and 1969 some 24,000 jobs a year were dispersed.

In 1966 the Location of Offices Bureau published "Commuters to the London Office - a survey". that indicated that 53% of commuters would prefer to work closer to home than in Central London.

The bureau was one of the many quangos abolished in the early years of the administration of Margaret Thatcher as part of the economic liberalization of the 1980s.
