= Hemmingwell =

Housing area within town of Wellingborough, England

Coordinates: 52.316284°N 0.6908190°W

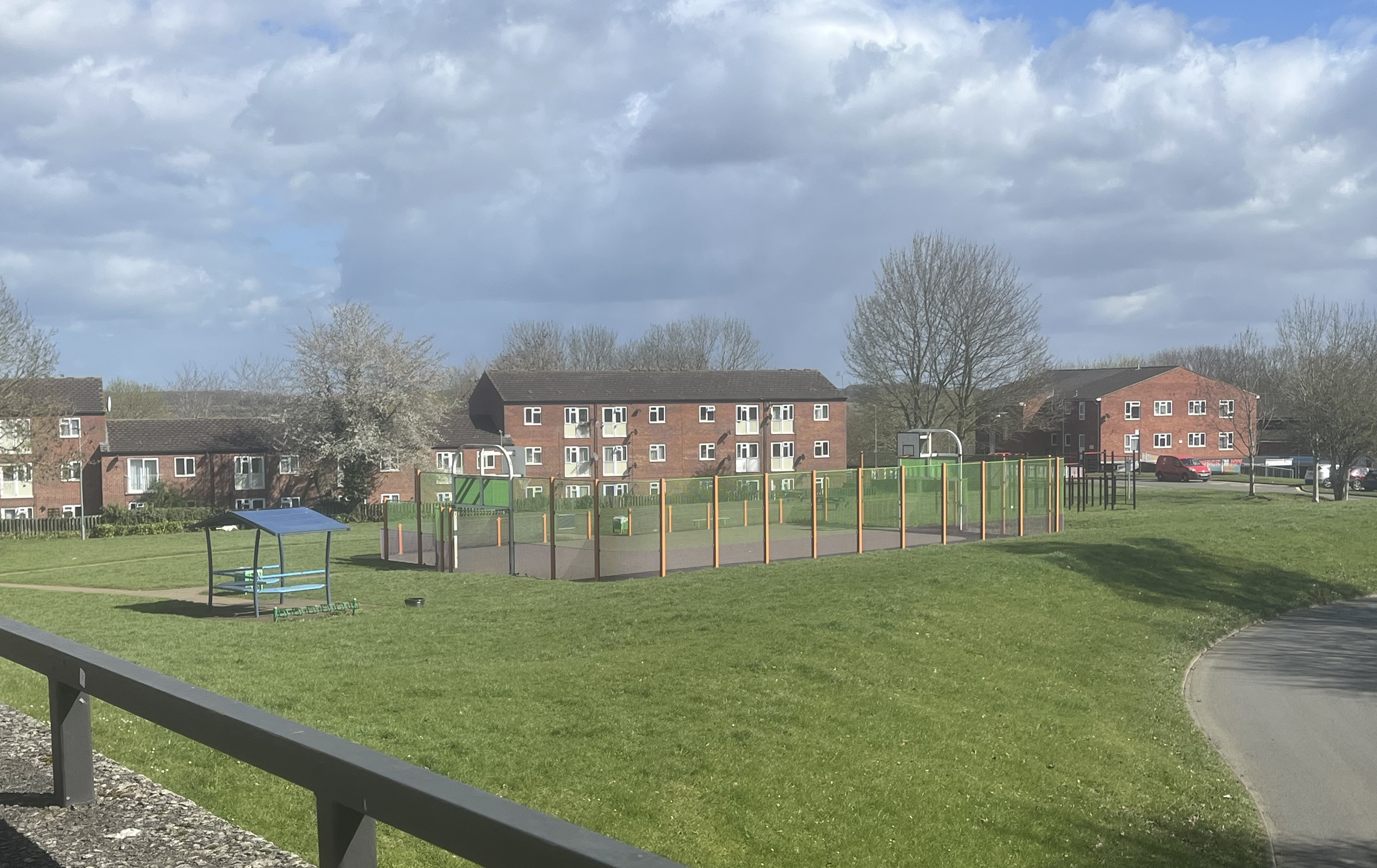
- Hemmingwell Park

- Location within Northamptonshire
- Population: 8,272 (2011 Census)
- OS grid reference: SP8933969493
- Unitary authority: North Northamptonshire
- Ceremonial county: Northamptonshire
- Region: East Midlands
- Country: England
- Sovereign state: United Kingdom
- Post town: WELLINGBOROUGH
- Postcode district: NN8
- Dialling code: 01933
- Police: Northamptonshire
- Fire: Northamptonshire
- Ambulance: East Midlands
- UK Parliament: Wellingborough

Hemmingwell is a suburb of Wellingborough, Northamptonshire. The area had a population of 8,272 at the 2011 census, and is situated roughly two miles north-east of Wellingborough town centre.

Consisting primarily of public housing, the estate is one of the most densely populated areas of the town, and is often considered to be 'Wellingborough's toughest estate'.

== History ==
Architectural model of Hemmingwell's northern edge, 1969

The area that would become Hemmingwell was first used for farming and allotments, and consisted of farms Nest Farm and Hemmingwell Farm. The estate takes its name from the latter, which in turn derived its name from the historic Hemmingwell spring, one of five wells traditionally associated with Wellingborough. In the late 1960s, the allotments were removed and construction of the estate begun. The estate was predominantly built to house London overspill population, consisting of a mixture of terraced houses and low-rise flats in a Radburn-style layout. The development was built adjacent to the estate known as 'The Pyghtle', which was built in the 1950s. Hemmingwell Road connects the two estates.

Archaeological investigations carried out during development of the area uncovered evidence of a Late Iron Age settlement north of present-day Nest Farm Road. Excavations in 1971 revealed occupation dating from approximately the 1st century BC until the Roman conquest of Britain in the 1st century AD.

From the 1980s until the early 2000s, strong putrid fumes from Chettles pet food factory along Ditchford Lane would usually blow upwind into Wellingborough, particularly eastern Wellingborough and Hemmingwell. Chettles took control of the problem in the early 2000s due to numerous complaints.

In 1997 following the ongoing eruption of Soufrière Hills volcano in Montserrat, a percentage of the 4,000 people evacuated from the island to the United Kingdom were moved into vacant properties on the estate, as part of the collaborative aid effort of both Monserrat and United Kingdom's governments.

From 2012–2014, the estate's garages and parking areas were redesigned to be more open and less concealed, in an effort to reduce crime and anti-social behaviour. For example, walls were removed or replaced with fences and barricades, along with other general improvements around the estate.

== Demographics ==
At the 2011 Census, Hemmingwell had a population of 8,272, with a near-even gender split of approximately 51% female and 49% male. The average age was 36, with a median age of 35, reflecting a relatively young population compared with national averages.

The estate has a diverse population in terms of country of birth. In 2011, around 81.5% of residents were born in England, with other significant groups including residents born in India (2.4%), Kenya (1.0%), Zimbabwe (0.8%), Bangladesh (0.5%), Jamaica (0.4%), and South Africa (0.4%). Smaller proportions were born in Scotland, Wales, and Ireland.

The proportion of residents born outside the United Kingdom is higher than national averages, reflecting patterns of post-1960s migration into Wellingborough associated with planned housing expansion and London overspill.

== Crime ==
Hemmingwell has consistently held a high crime rate and is known for gang-related violence. Crime patterns in the area have been linked in part to wider socio-economic deprivation associated with housing estates of similar design and tenure mix. The estate is also known for other offences, particularly arson.

In response to concerns regarding both arson and persistent anti-social behaviour, Northamptonshire Police launched targeted enforcement activity including Operation Restore in 2017, which focused on reducing deliberate fires and associated criminal damage within the estate. More recent policing strategies for the area have emphasised neighbourhood engagement and targeted patrols, with dedicated officers assigned to Hemmingwell as part of the Wellingborough North neighbourhood policing team.

== Parks and recreation ==
- Hemmingwell Park
- Fulmar Lane Skate Park
- Guillemot Park and Play Area

== Transport ==
=== Public transportation ===
The area is connected to Wellingborough town centre via Stagecoach’s W2 bus service, which runs from 07:20–19:22 Monday–Friday and from 07:55–19:22 on Saturdays.

Bus services in the area were previously operated under the “Connect Wellingborough” network branding, introduced in the 2000s as part of efforts to integrate and simplify local bus services. This branding has since been discontinued. Access to public transport within the estate is largely concentrated along its primary through-roads (such as Nest Farm Road and Nest Lane), meaning most residents reach bus stops via short walking routes.

The estate is roughly two miles away from Wellingborough railway station, which connects the town to London and the north of England.

=== Streets ===
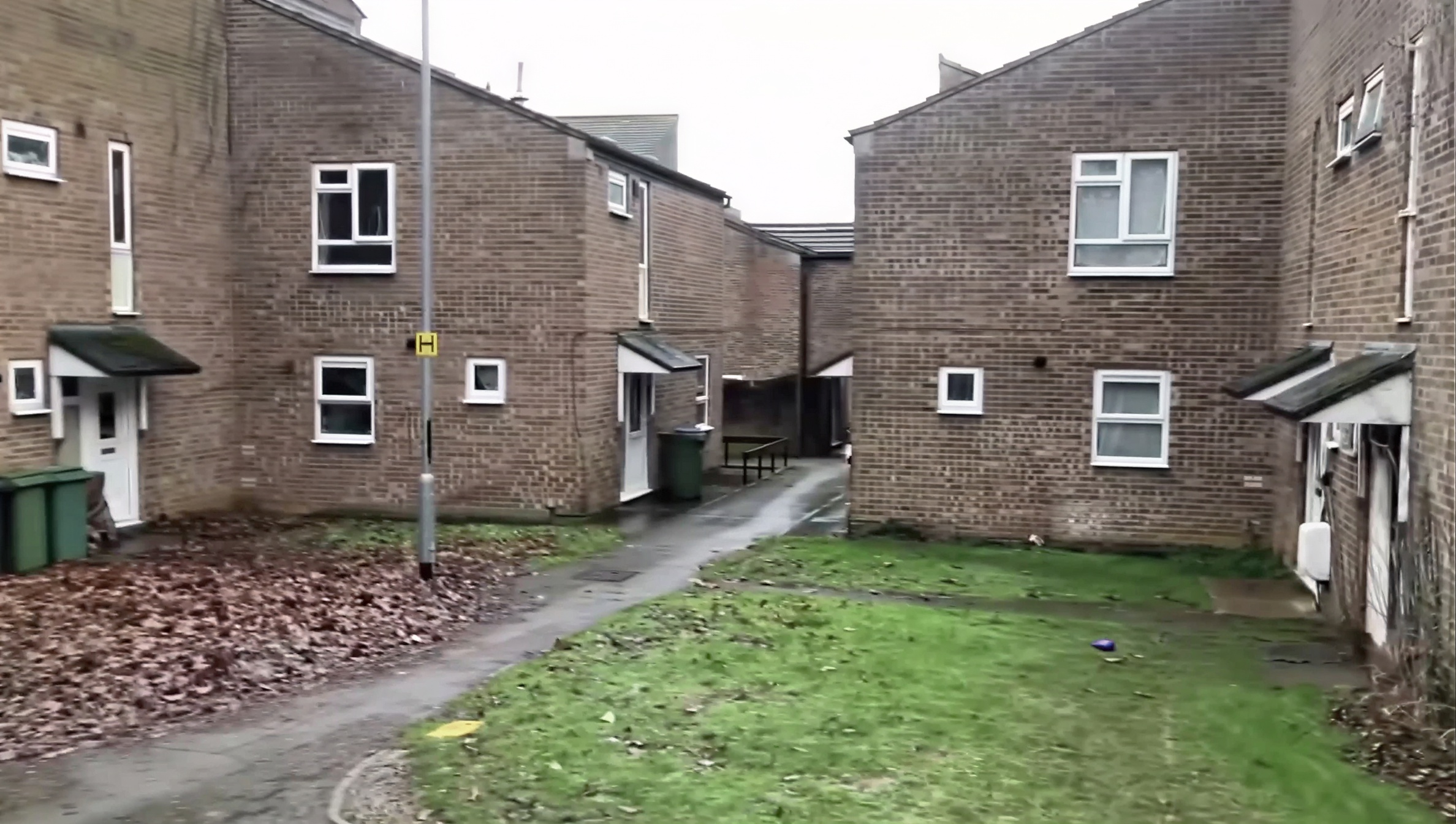
Fulmar Lane walkway

The area is primarily centred around Nest Farm Road which runs north–south between Northen Way and Nest Lane. The majority of roads in the area are named after birds, e.g Fulmar Lane, although a select few roads do not follow this rule, e.g Nursery Drive. The street layout in Hemmingwell largely reflects its Radburn-style planning, with many roads designed to prioritise pedestrian pathways and cul-de-sacs over through-traffic. Residential streets are often arranged around small housing clusters and open green spaces, with some routes connecting via footpaths rather than direct road access. This design was intended to reduce traffic danger within the estate, although it has also resulted in a network that can be less straightforward to navigate for visitors compared with traditional grid layouts.

== Governance ==
As of May 2025, Hemmingwell falls within the Hatton Park ward, and is represented on Wellingborough Town Council by seven councillors: Ken Harrington and Vinnie Whitrow (Reform UK), and Simon Masters, Jonathan Ekins, Judy Samworth, Launa Koriya and Raz Koriya (Conservative). The ward forms part of the parliamentary constituency of Wellingborough and the MP is Gen Kitchen (Labour).

== Geography ==
Hemmingwell is situated approximately 2 miles (3 km) from Wellingborough town centre. The area lies at an elevation of around 80–85 metres above sea level on relatively flat terrain typical of the surrounding East Midlands landscape. It is primarily a low-rise residential development, with surrounding areas including Finedon Road Industrial Estate to the north-east, Redwell to the north-west, and the Pyghtle to the south-west.

== Shops and amenities ==
Hemmingwell contains a number of local amenities serving residents of the estate. These include the Well Café, Chick N Joy, and K D Supermarket, which provide basic food, takeaway, and convenience retail services within the area. The estate is also served by Hope Church, which operates as a place of worship and community activity space. The Hemmingwell Community and Skills Centre provides local training, learning opportunities, and community support services.

== Education ==
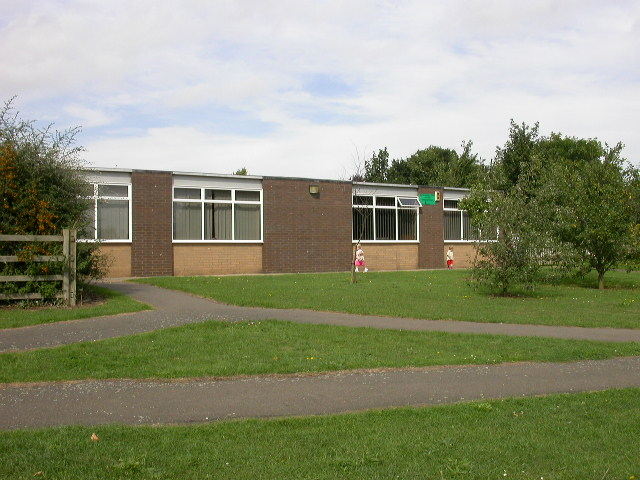
Oakway Academy

State funded schools:

- Oakway Academy
- Sir Christopher Hatton Academy

== See also ==
- Kingsway
- Queensway
