= Pembury Estate =

Housing estate in Hackney, London

Coordinates: 51°33′4.51″N 0°3′29.73″W

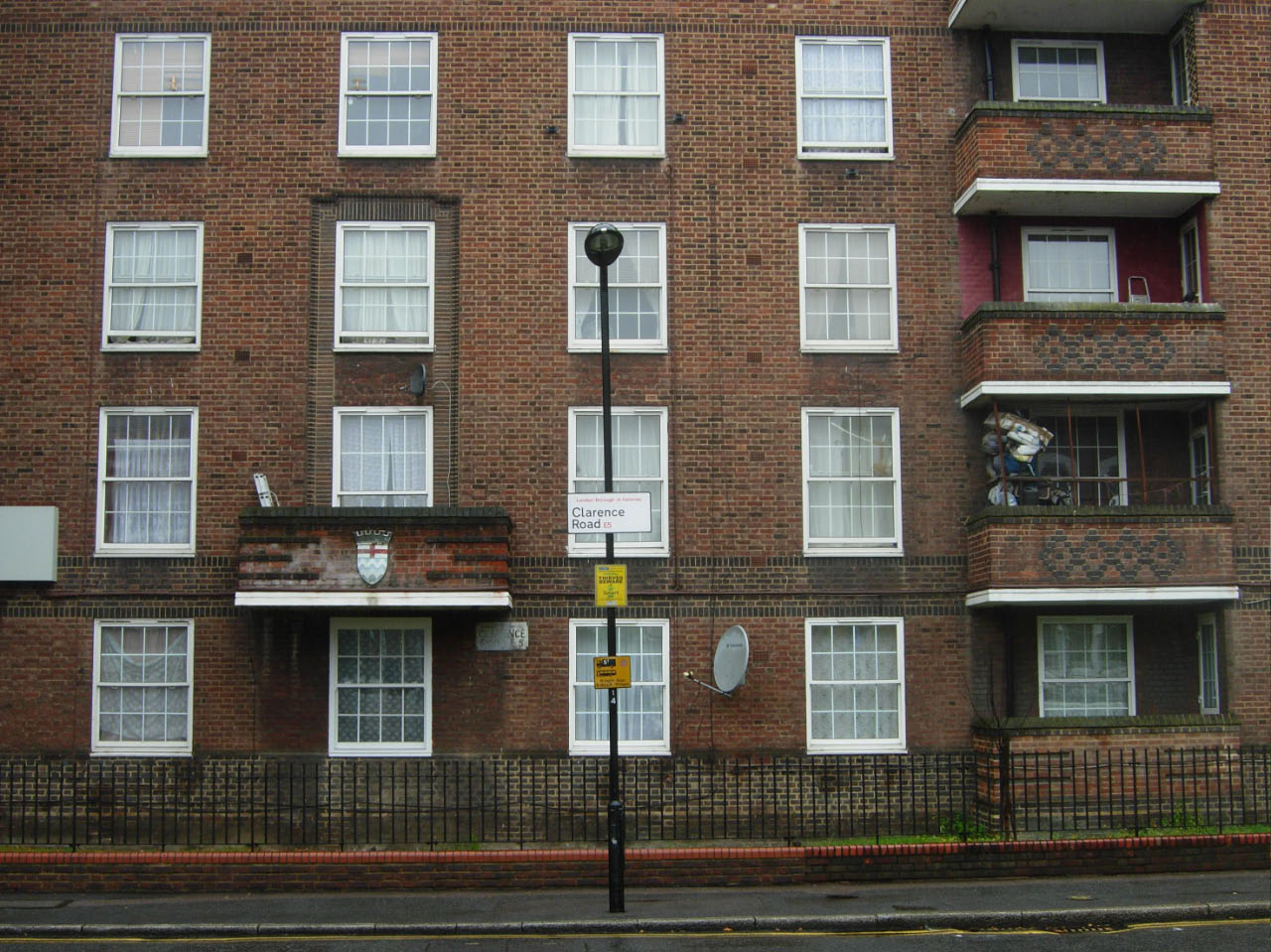
- Interactive map of Pembury Estate

General information
- Population: 2,000

Construction
- Constructed: 1930s-60s

Refurbishment
- Proposed in: 2011

Other information
- Governing body: Peabody Trust

The Pembury Estate is a housing estate in the London Borough of Hackney in East London next to the Hackney Downs. The Pembury Estate consists of two sections: Old Pembury and New Pembury (divided into East and West). Old Pembury consists of 24 1930s walk-up blocks. New Pembury consists of multiple 1960s maisonettes and bungalows, and the Pembury Circus development which is composed of 268 new homes. The Pembury Estate has approximately 1,500 to 2,000 residents. It is managed by the Peabody Trust.

The area saw violent protests during the 2011 England Riots.

== Regeneration ==
A regeneration of the estate has been planned since 2011.
