= Queensway, Wellingborough =

Housing area of Wellingborough, Northamptonshire, England

Coordinates: 52.3041599°N 0.7182623°W

Queensway
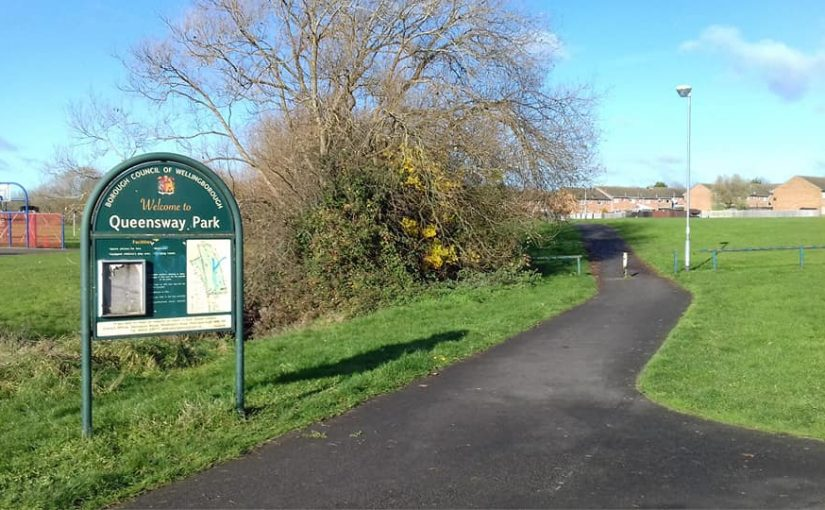
- Queensway Park

- Location within Northamptonshire
- Population: 5,818 (2011 Census)
- OS grid reference: SP8933969493
- Unitary authority: North Northamptonshire
- Ceremonial county: Northamptonshire
- Region: East Midlands
- Country: England
- Sovereign state: United Kingdom
- Post town: WELLINGBOROUGH
- Postcode district: NN8
- Dialling code: 01933
- Police: Northamptonshire
- Fire: Northamptonshire
- Ambulance: East Midlands
- UK Parliament: Wellingborough

Queensway is a suburb of Wellingborough, Northamptonshire. Running north–south between Hardwick Road and Northampton Road, Queensway, along with Kingsway and Gleneagles Drive, acts as an inner bypass of central Wellingborough, making it one of the most important and busiest roads in the town.

Colloquially referred to as 'Queens', the estate is situated on the west side of Wellingborough town. The area had a population of 5,818 at the 2011 census.

== History ==
Queensway expansion underway in 1971

Queensway was significantly expanded in the 1960s–70s to re-house overspill population from London in a collaborative effort between Greater London Council and Wellingborough Urban District Council, both now defunct. Prior to this expansion, Queensway was a medium-sized council estate, with predominantly semi-detached council houses, with a large portion of the area consisting of green land and fields. In 2015, the Queensway area faced a large amount of regeneration following the transfer of Wellingborough social housing from Wellingborough Council to Wellingborough Homes (now Greatwell Homes).

== Crime and poverty ==
For a significant period Queensway has been known for gang related crime and violence. In 2021, Queensway was one of the 225 neighborhoods across the UK identified as being 'left behind' by the government.

== Public transport ==
The area is served by Stagecoach's W1 bus.

== Governance ==
As of November 2025, Queensway falls within the Brickhill and Queensway ward, and is represented on Wellingborough Town Council by Gavin Beales (Reform UK). The ward forms part of the parliamentary constituency of Wellingborough and the MP is Gen Kitchen (Labour).

== Education ==
State funded schools:

- Olympic Primary School
- Ruskin Academy
- Weavers Academy

== Notable people ==
- Anita Neil (born 1950), first Black British female Olympian.

== See also ==
- Hemmingwell
- Kingsway
