= Grade II* listed buildings in Kettering (borough) =

There are over 20,000 Grade II* listed buildings in England. This page is a list of these buildings in the former district of Kettering in Northamptonshire, now part of the unitary authority area of North Northamptonshire.

== Kettering ==
Name	Location	Type	Completed (Note: The date given is the date used by Historic England as significant for the initial building or that of an important part in the structure's description.)	Date designated	Grid ref. (Note: Sometimes known as OSGB36, the grid reference is based on the British national grid reference system used by the Ordnance Survey.) Geo-coordinates	Entry number (Note: The "List Entry Number" is a unique number assigned to each listed building and scheduled monument by Historic England.)	Image
The Rectory	Barton Seagrave, Kettering	House	Late 17th century	27 February 1950	SP8876377048; 52°23′03″N 0°41′50″W	1372630	Upload Photo
Church of All Saints	Braybrooke, Kettering	Parish Church	13th century	25 February 1957	SP7646684592; 52°27′14″N 0°52′34″W	1289123	Church of All Saints More images
Church of St Andrew	Broughton, Kettering	Parish Church	12th century	25 February 1957	SP8371875799; 52°22′26″N 0°46′18″W	1289054	Church of St Andrew More images
Dovecote at Burton Latimer Hall	Burton Latimer, Kettering	Dovecote	late 16th century or early 17th century	18 January 1950	SP8985275342; 52°22′08″N 0°40′54″W	1191366	Upload Photo
Jacobean House	Burton Latimer, Kettering	House	1972	18 January 1950	SP9023275083; 52°21′59″N 0°40′34″W	1052126	Jacobean House More images
Church of St Andrew	Cranford St Andrew, Cranford, Kettering	Church	Late 12th century	25 February 1957	SP9238677271; 52°23′08″N 0°38′38″W	1052098	Church of St Andrew More images
Church of St John	Cranford St John, Cranford, Kettering	Parish Church	12th century	25 February 1957	SP9272677092; 52°23′02″N 0°38′21″W	1191477	Church of St John More images
Dovecote at Dairy Farm	Cranford St Andrew, Cranford, Kettering	Dovecote	15th century	25 October 1951	SP9231177298; 52°23′09″N 0°38′42″W	1191580	Dovecote at Dairy Farm More images
The Manor House	Cranford St John, Cranford, Kettering	House	19th century	25 October 1951	SP9250376960; 52°22′58″N 0°38′32″W	1052100	Upload Photo
Cransley Hall	Cransley, Kettering	Country House	1677	25 October 1951	SP8288876605; 52°22′52″N 0°47′01″W	1289058	Cransley Hall
Church of All Saints	Dingley, Kettering	Church	13th century	25 February 1957	SP7695787696; 52°28′54″N 0°52′06″W	1372349	Church of All Saints More images
Bridge over River Ise	Geddington, Kettering	Bridge	c. 1250	25 February 1957	SP8938682923; 52°26′13″N 0°41′12″W	1191813	Bridge over River Ise More images
Church of St Peter and Paul	Harrington, Kettering	Parish Church	Early 14th century	25 February 1957	SP7783880574; 52°25′03″N 0°51′25″W	1213602	Church of St Peter and Paul More images
Church of St Leonard	Loddington, Kettering	Parish Church	13th century	25 February 1957	SP8146278355; 52°23′50″N 0°48′15″W	1288918	Church of St Leonard More images
Loddington Hall	Loddington, Kettering	Apartment	c. 1300	25 October 1951	SP8138578433; 52°23′52″N 0°48′19″W	1213737	Upload Photo
Church of St Peter	Little Oakley, Newton and Little Oakley, Kettering	Parish Church	13th century	25 February 1957	SP8919785596; 52°27′40″N 0°41′19″W	1052023	Church of St Peter More images
Manor Farmhouse and attached Outbuildings	Little Oakley, Newton and Little Oakley, Kettering	Farmhouse	16th century	25 October 1951	SP8917085561; 52°27′39″N 0°41′20″W	1372407	Upload Photo
Newton Field Centre	Newton, Newton and Little Oakley, Kettering	Parish Church	14th century	25 February 1957	SP8844883287; 52°26′25″N 0°42′01″W	1052061	Newton Field Centre More images
The Orton Trust Workshop	Orton, Kettering	Stonemasons Yard	1991	25 October 1951	SP8056679417; 52°24′25″N 0°49′02″W	1213823	The Orton Trust Workshop More images
Jesus Hospital	Rothwell, Kettering	Apartment	1950	12 June 1950	SP8167681092; 52°25′18″N 0°48′01″W	1288810	Jesus Hospital More images
Rothwell United Reformed Church	Rothwell, Kettering	Church Hall	1909	23 January 1985	SP8137480930; 52°25′13″N 0°48′18″W	1213989	Rothwell United Reformed Church More images
Church of All Saints	Rushton, Kettering	Parish Church	Norman	25 February 1957	SP8409382874; 52°26′15″N 0°45′52″W	1052039	Church of All Saints More images
Glendon Hall	Glendon, Rushton, Kettering	House	mid/late 16th century	25 October 1951	SP8447481356; 52°25′25″N 0°45′33″W	1192189	Glendon Hall More images
The Grooms House	Rushton, Kettering	House	Early 18th century	25 October 1951	SP8385382795; 52°26′12″N 0°46′05″W	1372412	Upload Photo
Church of St Botolph	Stoke Albany, Kettering	Church	Late 13th century	25 February 1957	SP8055188294; 52°29′12″N 0°48′55″W	1372373	Church of St Botolph More images
The Manor House	Stoke Albany, Kettering	Manor House	15th century TO 17th century	25 October 1951	SP8069287914; 52°28′59″N 0°48′48″W	1189756	Upload Photo
The Old House	Stoke Albany, Kettering	Manor House	Late 14th century	25 October 1951	SP8049488256; 52°29′11″N 0°48′58″W	1052146	Upload Photo
Church of All Saints	Thorpe Malsor, Kettering	Parish Church	Late 13th century	25 February 1957	SP8336979008; 52°24′10″N 0°46′34″W	1214178	Church of All Saints More images
Montagu Hospital	Weekley, Kettering	House	1611	25 October 1951	SP8880280918; 52°25′09″N 0°41′44″W	1052010	Montagu Hospital More images
The Dower House	Boughton Park, Weekley, Kettering	House	1705	25 October 1951	SP9004681543; 52°25′28″N 0°40′38″W	1342871	Upload Photo
Church of All Saints	Wilbarston, Kettering	Church	12th century	25 February 1957	SP8119988364; 52°29′14″N 0°48′20″W	1293981	Church of All Saints More images
Barton Seagrave Hall	Barton Seagrave, Kettering	Country House	18th century	27 February 1950	SP8874877304; 52°23′12″N 0°41′51″W	1372597	Barton Seagrave Hall More images
Carey House	Kettering	House	18th century	27 February 1950	SP8653878904; 52°24′05″N 0°43′46″W	1051659	Carey House More images
Church of Saint Mary	Kettering	Church	1932	14 April 1976	SP8743179037; 52°24′09″N 0°42′59″W	1051645	Church of Saint Mary More images
Manor House	Kettering	House	17th century	27 February 1950	SP8672478376; 52°23′48″N 0°43′37″W	1189094	Upload Photo
Sawyer's Almshouses	Kettering	Almshouse	1688	27 February 1950	SP8663978269; 52°23′44″N 0°43′41″W	1372594	Upload Photo
