= Robert Maunsell (Royal Navy officer) =

Royal Navy officer, post-captain in 1812 (d. 1845)

Robert Maunsell CB
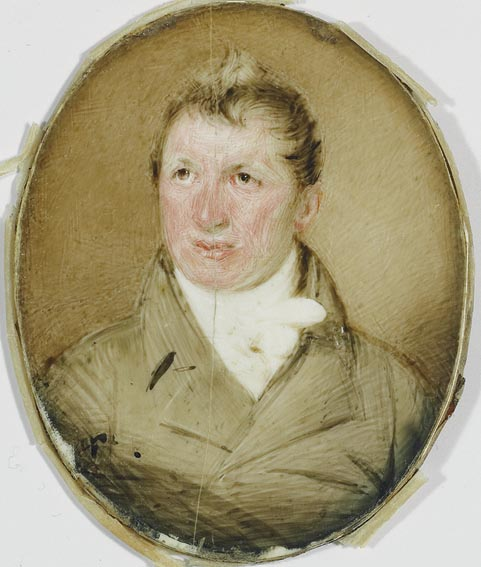
- Portrait miniature by John Comerford, 1814
- Born: 1785 / May 1786; Limerick, Ireland
- Died: 31 August 1845 (aged 60); London, England
- Burial place: Thorpe Malsor Church
- Military career
- Allegiance: Great Britain; United Kingdom
- Service: Royal Navy
- Service years: 1799–1843
- Rank: Post-captain
- Commands: HMS Procris (1808–11); HMS Illustrious (1811–12); HMS Chatham (1812–14); HMS Alfred (1831–33); HMS Rodney (1842–43)
- Conflicts: Napoleonic Wars; Action of 11 July 1804 (WIA); Invasion of Java; Action of 31 July 1811

Captain Robert Charles Maunsell (1785/6–1845) was an Anglo-Irish officer in the British Royal Navy, rising to the rank of post-captain. He was born at Limerick, a son of Archdeacon William Maunsell, in 1785 or 1786. He had one brother in the Church, and another in the Army.

He entered the Royal Navy on board the Mermaid, 32 guns, Captain Robert Dudley Oliver, in 1799; and subsequently served under Captains Richard Hussey Moubray and George Elliot, in the Maidstone, 32 guns, on the Mediterranean station. On 11 July 1804, he received a very severe wound in the hip, while assisting at the destruction of about a dozen French settees, at La Vandour, near Toulon, by the boats of the Maidstone and her consorts, under the orders of Lieutenant John Thompson; and for his gallant conduct on that occasion, he was rewarded with a commission as Lieutenant, dated 7 March 1805, the day on which he completed his time. From that period, he served on board the Princess Royal, 98 guns, in the Channel fleet. He was promoted to Commander on 8 March 1808.

Maunsell next commanded the Procris brig, on the East India station, where he destroyed the Dutch Company's vessel Wagster, of 8 guns, 4 swivels, and 86 men, in about 1810. At the commencement of the operations against Java, he performed a gallant exploit, leading men of the 14th and 89th regiments ashore to the attack of six of the enemy's gunboats. He was rewarded by an appointment to command the Illustrious, 74 guns, bearing the broad pendant of Commodore Broughton; and during the subsequent operations against Batavia, he bore a very distinguished part on shore, under the orders of Captain Sayer; particularly at the assault of Meester Cornelis, on 27 August 1811.

On 10 September, Commodore Broughton joined Rear-Admiral Stopford, off Samarang; and in the course of the ensuing night, several of the enemy's gun vessels, lying in-shore, were attacked and destroyed by the boats of the squadron, under the directions of Captain Maunsell; whose post commission was confirmed by the Admiralty, on 7 February 1812. His next appointment was, on 24 or 25 August 1812, to the Chatham, 74 guns, bearing the flag of Rear-Admiral Matthew Henry Scott, on the North Sea station; the command of which ship he retained till July 1814.

After 16 years ashore, he was next, on 22 February 1831, placed in command of the Alfred, 50 guns, and sent to the Mediterranean, where he remained for three years. His last appointment was, on 13 May 1840, to the Rodney, 92 guns, bound for Alexandria, where he opened communications between Commodore Napier and Mehemet Ali. In October 1843 the Rodney was paid off. On 20 July 1838, Captain Maunsell was nominated a C.B. He died on 31 August 1845.

== Genealogy ==
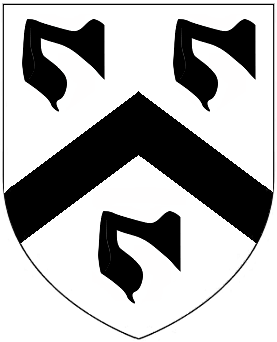
Canting arms of Maunsell: Argent, a chevron, between three Maunches, sable. Motto: Quod Vult Valde Vult

The family of Maunsell, of Thorpe Malsor, in Northamptonshire, of which Robert was a scion, is recorded from the period of the Norman Conquest. Ralph Maunsell held lands in Buckinghamshire in the time of Henry II, and his lineal descendant, John Maunsell, Esq., of Chicheley, Buckinghamshire, a barrister, purchased from Lord Holland the rectory, manor, and estate of Thorpe Malsor in 1622. From that time, the main line of the family continued to reside at Thorpe Malsor.

Robert Maunsell was a son of a younger brother of the house. He was born, in 1785, or in May 1786, at Limerick, the third, or fourth, son of William Maunsell, Archdeacon of Kildare, and Chancellor of Limerick, by Lucy, daughter and co-heir of Philip Oliver, Esq., M.P., of Castle Oliver, County Limerick; and a near relative of Admiral Robert Dudley Oliver. His eldest brother, Thomas Philip Maunsell, Esq., of Thorpe Malsor, who inherited the family estate, was M.P. for the northern division of Northamptonshire, Colonel of the Northampton Militia, and Captain of the Kettering Yeomanry Cavalry: his second, William Wray Maunsell, Archdeacon of Limerick, married the eldest daughter of Charles Warburton, Bishop of Cloyne.

== Service ==
=== Early service ===
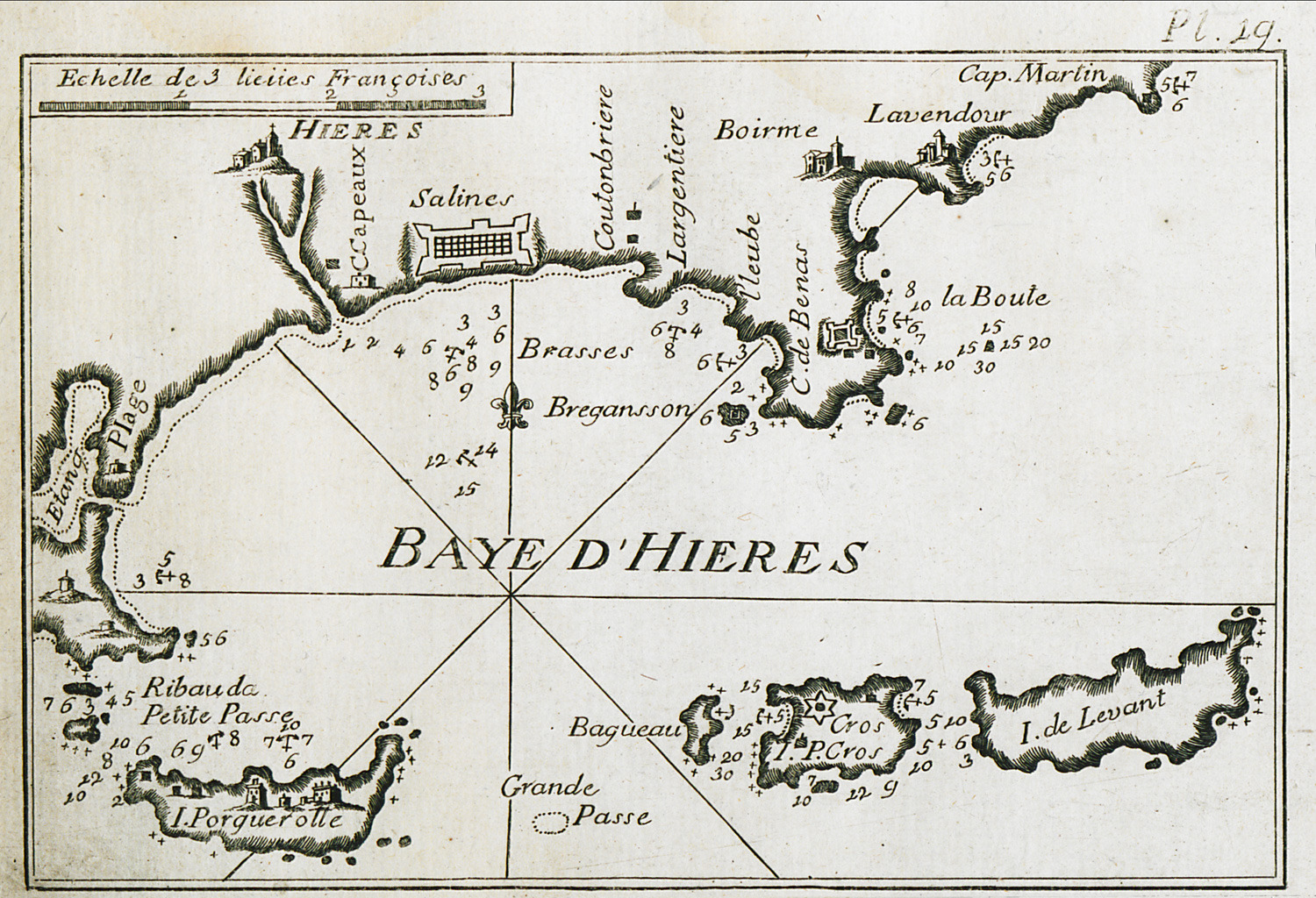
Map of the Bay of Hiérès, 1804

Maunsell entered the Royal Navy, in February 1799, as First Class Volunteer, on board the Mermaid, 32 guns, commanded by his relative, Captain Robert Dudley Oliver, fitting for the Mediterranean; where he attained the rating of Midshipman in July 1800, removed in 1801 to the Maidstone, 32 guns, Captains Richard Hussey Moubray and George Elliot, and continued actively employed until the end of 1804. During that period to be made a participator in many cutting-out affairs; but particularly on 11 July 1804, when, holding the rating of Master's Mate, he served with the boats of the Maidstone, Narcissus, and Seahorse, 10 in number, under the orders of Lieutenant John Thompson, (Note: Lieutenant Thompson was killed in the barge of the Melpomene frigate, Captain Sir Peter Parker, at the capture of a French armed settee, near Leghorn, on 4 July 1806.) and assisted at the capture of 12 settees, lying at La Vandour, in the Bay of Hières, after a conflict, in which the British, encountered by a tremendous fire of grape-shot and musketry, as well from the vessels themselves as from a battery and the houses of the town, sustained a loss of 4 men killed and 23 (including himself, severely) wounded. (Note: In consideration of the injury he received the Patriotic Society voted him a gratuity.)

He was promoted, as soon as he had accomplished his time, to a Lieutenancy, on 7 March 1805, in the Princess Royal, 98 guns, Captain Robert Carthew Reynolds, attached to the Channel fleet. (Note: He had often, previously, had charge of a watch.) On 8 March 1808 he was promoted to the rank of Commander.

=== East Indies ===
1:48 scale plan for Cephalus and Procris, 1 February 1806

Being next, on 26 May 1807, appointed to the Blanche, 28 guns, Captain John Edgcumbe, on the East India station, he took a passage thither, possibly in the St. Alban's, 64 guns. Soon after his arrival, he was advanced, by a commission dated 15 February 1808, to the command of the Procris, 18 guns.

Among the numerous prizes made by Maunsell in the sloop Procris, was the capture, in July 1810, or else in 1809, of the Dutch Company's brig Wagster, of 8 guns, 4 swivels, and 86 men.

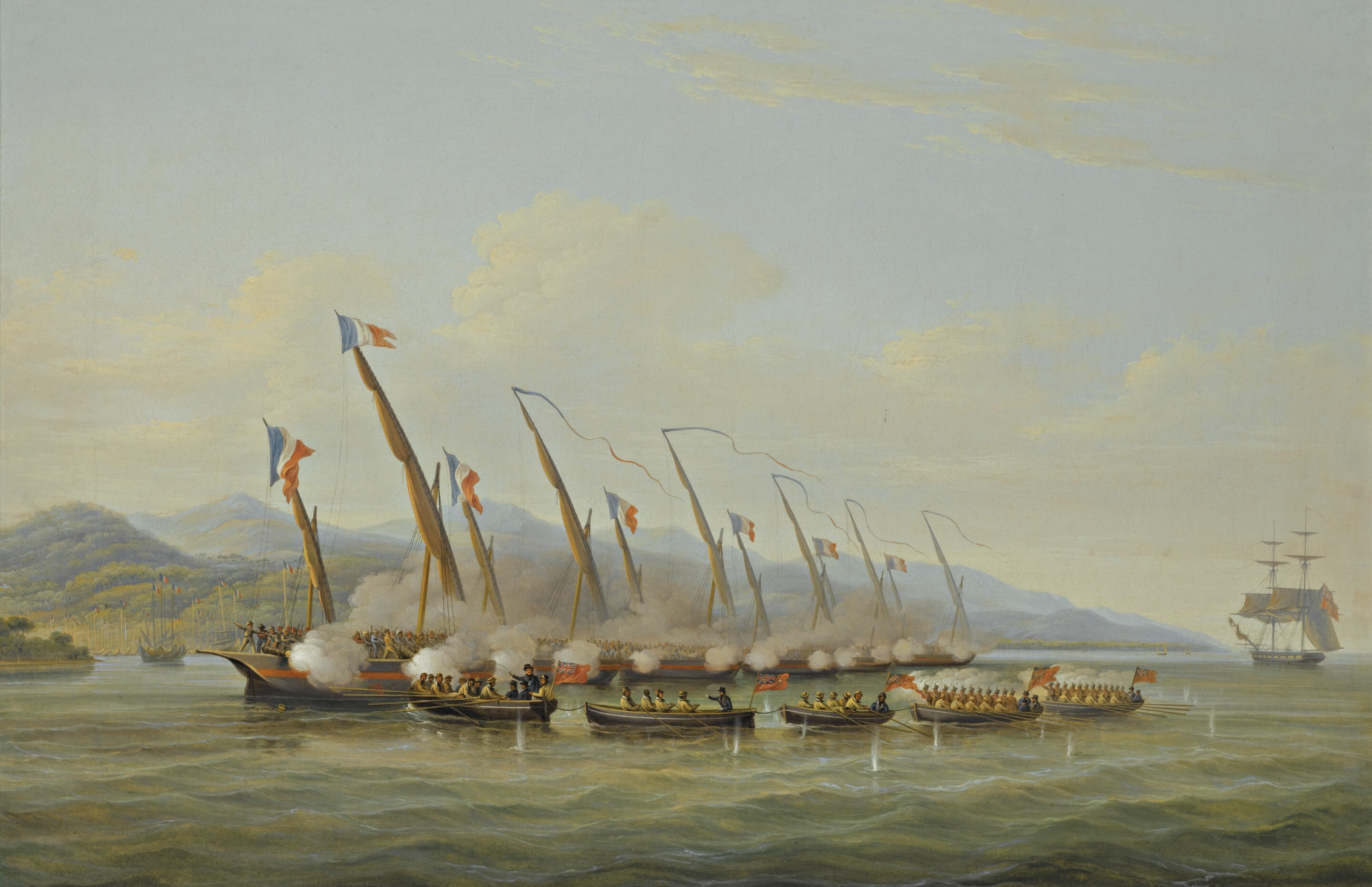
W. Huggins: Capt. Robert Maunsell capturing French gunboats off Java, July 1811

On the morning of 31 July 1811, being off the mouth of the Indramayo River, coast of Java, he took personal command of the boats of the Procris, together with two flat-boats, carrying an officer and 20 men of the 14th Regiment, and an officer and 20 men from the 89th Regiment, and with a degree of skill and ability that called forth the after-thanks of Commodore Broughton, led them ashore to the attack of six of the enemy's gunboats; each mounting 1 brass 32-pounder carronade forward and 1 18-pounder aft, both on pivots, with a crew of more than 60 men, in convoy of 40 or 50 proas. Although the latter contrived to escape by hauling through the mud up the river, five of the armed vessels were boarded and carried, and the remaining one destroyed; this with a loss of only 11 men wounded, notwithstanding that the enemy, in addition to the fire of their guns, kept up a constant discharge of musketry. As a reward for his meritorious conduct, Maunsell was almost immediately placed in acting-command of the Illustrious, 74 guns, bearing the broad pendant of Commodore Broughton.

Prior to the event just recorded, he had been ordered to take charge of a transport with 400 troops in the Sunda Strait, for the purpose of joining the expedition then daily expected off Batavia. Owing to the reluctance felt by the Master of the transport to run during the night, Maunsell, fearing that the delay thereby occasioned would prevent their arriving at the appointed rendezvous in time to assist in the landing, took the whole 400 men on board his own vessel, and by his promptitude in so doing was enabled to reach his destination two days previous to the debarkation, whereas the transport did not arrive until nearly a month afterwards.

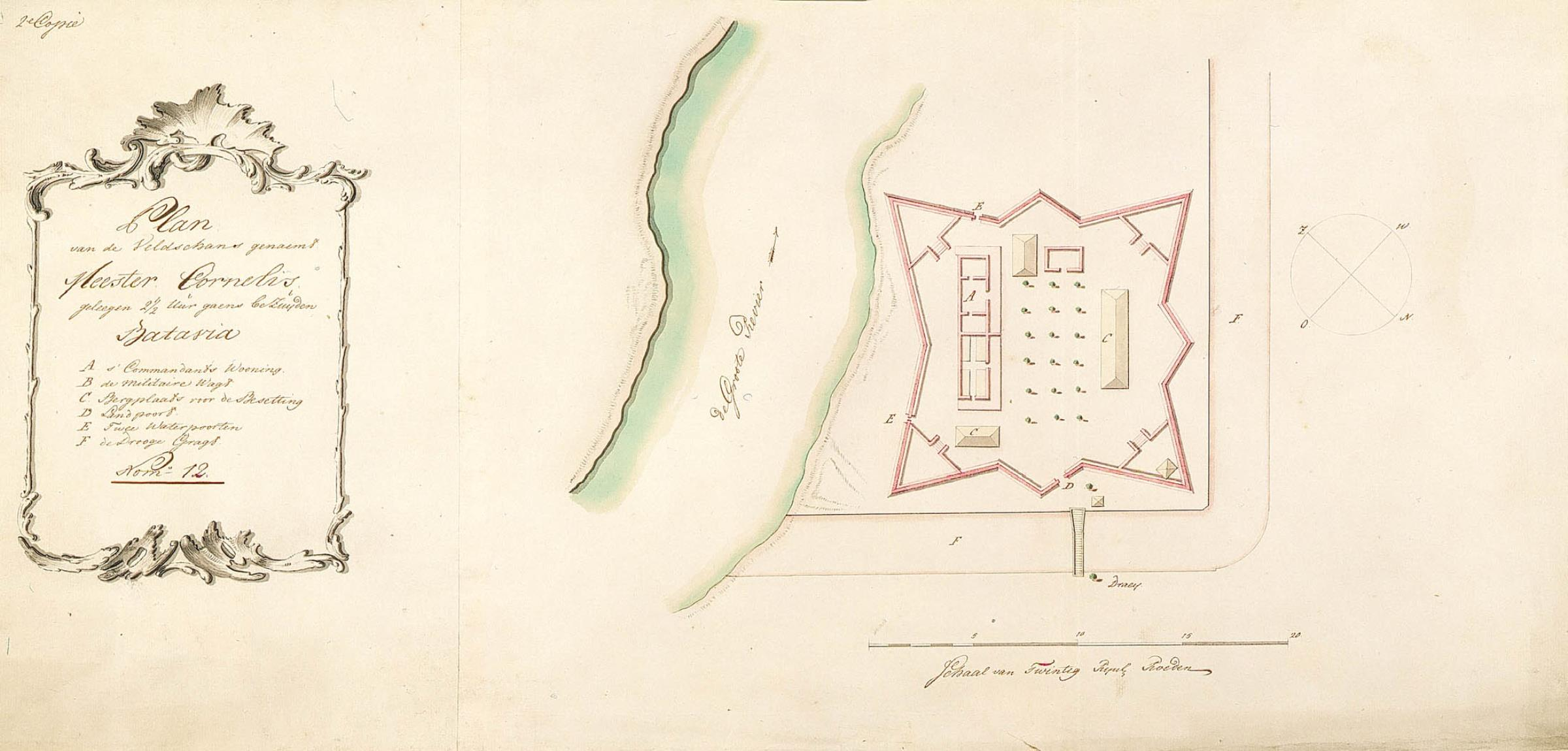
Dutch plan of the Meester Cornelis entrenchment, near Batavia, c. 1764

During his command of the Illustrious, (Note: Richard Maunsell was a midshipman on board the Illustrious. Whilst serving with his cousin, Captain Robert Maunsell, he was killed in the action against the Dutch at Java.) a period of about two months, Maunsell served on shore throughout all the operations which terminated in the fall of Java; where he enacted a distinguished part on shore at the head of a body of seamen, and aided in the bombardment and storming of Fort Cornelis on 26 August 1811. On the night of 10 September, with a division of boats under his orders, he took captive, in the neighbourhood of Samarang, a large sloop-rigged gun-boat, mounting 4 heavy guns and 2 brass swivels, a Malay-rigged gun-boat, carrying 1 12-pounder carronade, and a despatch-boat.

=== Post-captain ===
In the early part of 1812, on 7 February in which year he was confirmed to Post-rank, Captain Maunsell, in consequence of an attack of Batavian fever, returned to England; and on 24 or 25 August 1812, was appointed to the Chatham, 74 guns, bearing the flag in the North Sea of Rear-Admiral Matthew Henry Scott, with whom he continued until 26 May 1814.

=== Later service ===
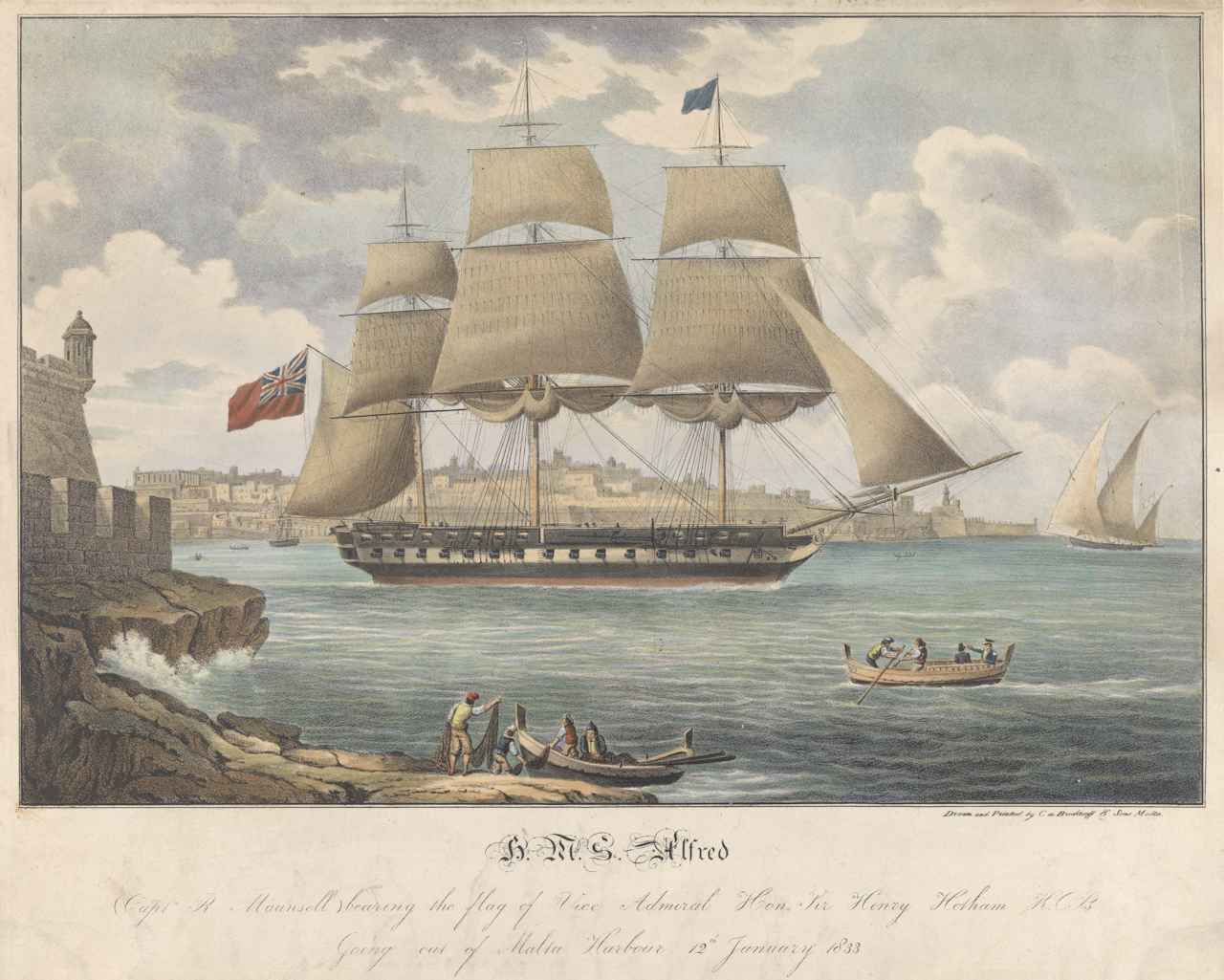
C. F. de Brocktorff: HMS Alfred (Capt R. Mounsell [sic]) bearing the flag of Vice Admiral Hon. Sir Henry Hotham KCB. Going out of Malta Harbour 12^{th} January 1833, n.d.

After 16 years' incessant application for employment, he was next, on 22 February 1831, placed in command of the Alfred, 50 guns, and sent to the Mediterranean; where, during a servitude of three years, he witnessed the establishment of King Otho on the throne of Greece, and was selected to watch the movements of the hostile fleets of Turkey and Egypt.

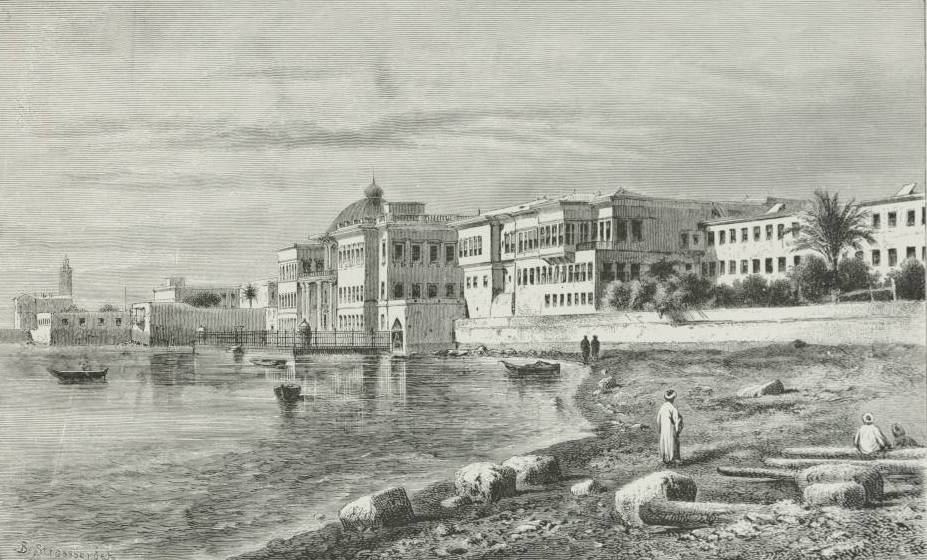
Engraved view of the vice-regal palace at Alexandria, c. 1878

His last appointment afloat was, on 13 May 1840, to the Rodney, 92 guns. On his arrival in that ship off Alexandria, on 22 November 1840, he was instructed by Commodore Napier to open a direct communication between him and Mehemet Ali. Landing, accordingly, close to the palace, he managed to pass the guards unmolested, and, entering the presence-chamber, without introduction, had the good fortune to obtain a very flattering audience, and fully to carry out the object of his mission. The next day he landed, with the Commodore, and, perhaps, remained with him until the conclusion of the convention between him and Mehemet Ali, the Egyptian potentate.

The Rodney, it appears, was the means of afterwards, in November 1842, rescuing the Formidable, 84 guns, when on shore near Barcelona; and in the course of December was present at the reduction of that city by the force under Espartero. In the spring of 1843, having returned to England, she was despatched to the Cape of Good Hope with the 7th Dragoon Guards, a company of the 45th Regiment, another of Artillery, and 150 men, on board. In October 1843 she was paid off.

=== Honours ===
On 20 July 1838, Captain Maunsell was nominated a C.B.; and in April 1844, as a tribute to "his high personal character, and his eminent professional service", he was spontaneously appointed by the prime minister, Sir Robert Peel, a Commissioner of Greenwich Hospital.

== Death ==
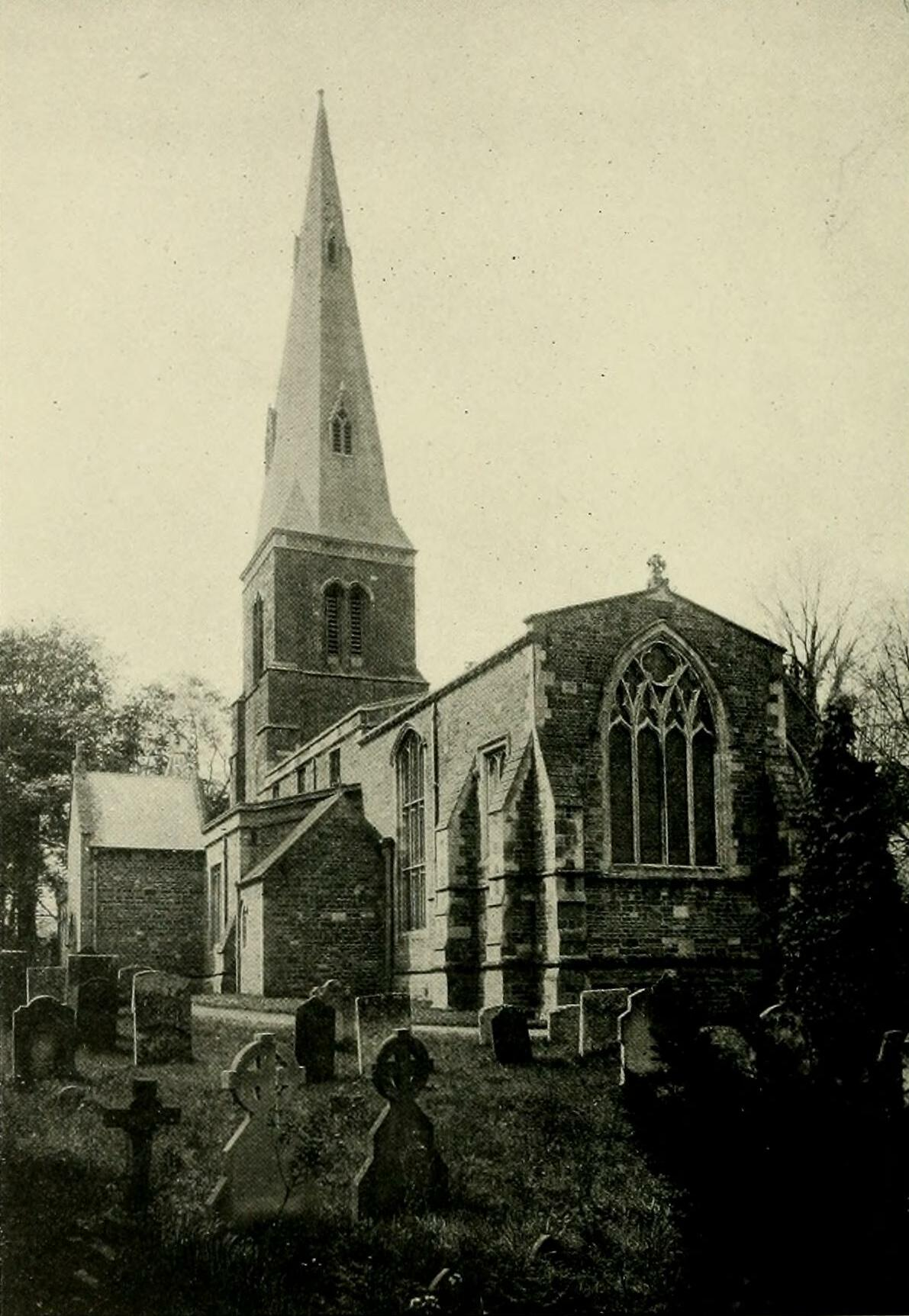
Thorpe Malsor Church, c. 1903

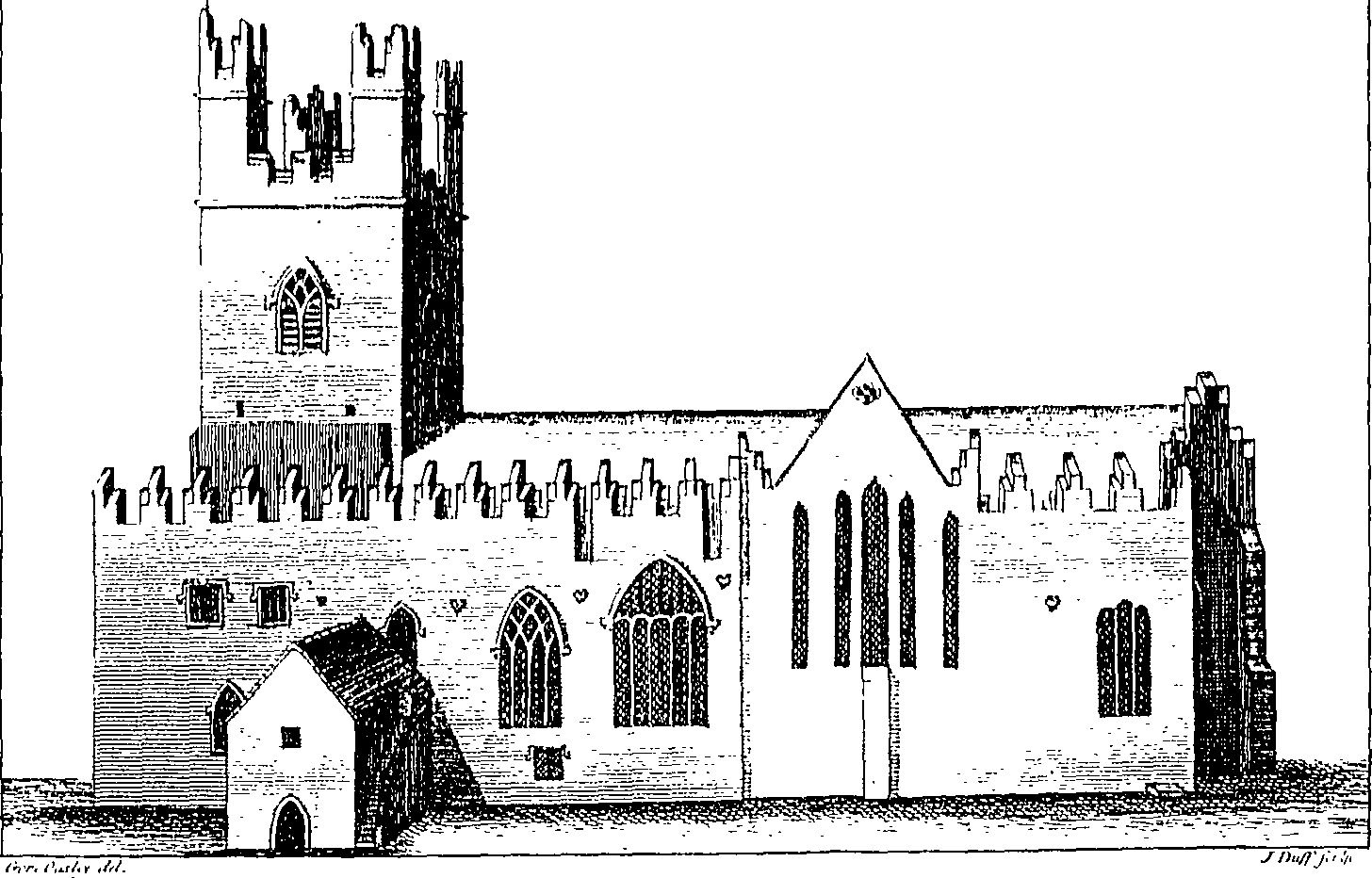
Limerick Cathedral, 1787

The death of Captain Robert Maunsell, who was unmarried, occurred at London on 31 August 1845. He bequeathed his landed property and 8000l. to his brother, the Archdeacon of Limerick; 3,500l. to his sister, Mrs. Joseph Gabbett, and his swords, medals, decorations, and various honorary gifts, which he received during his long service, to his brothers, Colonel Maunsell, M.P., and Captain John Maunsell, Royal Horse Artillery. He was buried in the parish church of Thorpe Malsor. There is also a monument to his memory in St. Mary's Cathedral, Limerick, which bears the following inscription:

A.J. MAUNSELL
CAUSED THIS MONUMENT TO BE ERECTED
IN MEMORY OF
HER BELOVED BROTHER
CAPTAIN ROBERT MAUNSELL C.B., CAPT, R.N
COMMISSIONER OF GREENWICH HOSPITAL
HIS REMAINS ARE
INTERED IN THE PARISH CHURCH OF
THORPE MALSOR NORTHAMPTONSIRE
AFTER A LIFE
ACTIVELY AND GALLANTLY SPENT
IN THE SERVICE OF HIS COUNTRY
HE DIED AT LONDON 21^{ST.} AUG. 1845,
BORN 18^{TH.} MARCH 1786,
ENTERED THE NAVY 1799,
LIEUT. 1805, POST CAPT. 1812,
HE WAS FOURTH SON OF
THE VENERABLE WILLIAM MAUNSELL
ARCHDEADON OF KILDARE AND
CHANCELLOR OF LIMERICK CATHEDRAL.

== See also ==
- History of the Royal Navy (after 1707)
- Naval artillery in the Age of Sail

== Sources ==
- Allen, Joseph (1852). Battles of the British Navy. Vol. 2 (New ed.). London: Henry G. Bohn. pp. 86–7, 328–9, 525.
- Caffrey, Paul (1999). John Comerford and the Portrait Miniature in Ireland c. 1620–1850. Kilkenny: Kilkenny Archaeological Society. p. 71.
- Ebers, Georg (1878). Egypt: Descriptive, Historical, and Picturesque. Vol. 1. Translated by Bell, Clara. New York: Cassell & Company, Limited.
- Maunsell, Robert George (1903). History of Maunsell, or Mansel, and of Crayford, Gabbett, Knoyle, Persse, Toler, Waller, Castletown; Waller, Prior Park; Warren, White, Winthrop, and Mansell of Guernsey. Cork: Guy and Company Limited. pp. 72, 85 (note), 179–80 (appendix 111).
- Descriptive Catalogue of the Portraits of Naval Commanders, Representations of Naval Actions, Relics, &c.: Exhibited in the Painted Hall of Greenwich Hospital, and the Royal Naval Museum, Greenwich. London: Printed for H.M. Stationery Office, by Eyre and Spottiswoode. 1906.
- "Obituary of Eminent Persons, Recently Deceased. Captain Robert Maunsell, C.B." The Illustrated London News. 13 September 1845. p. 170.
- "Fashionable World". The Morning Post. 13 September 1845. p. 5.

Attribution:

- Marshall, John (1823–1835). "Donnelly, Ross" . Royal Naval Biography. Vol. 52.4.4. London: Longman and Company. pp. 663–666.
- Marshall, John (1823–1835). "Sayer, George" . Royal Naval Biography. Vol. 52.19.1. London: Longman and Company. pp. 350–360.
- Marshall, John (1823–1835). "Maunsell, Robert" . Royal Naval Biography. Vol. 52.13.2. London: Longman and Company. pp. 36–39.
- O'Byrne, William R. (1849). "Maunsell, Robert" . A Naval Biographical Dictionary. Vol. 14.2. London: John Murray. pp. 745–746.
