= Grade II* listed buildings in Corby =

There are over 20,000 Grade II* listed buildings in England. This page is a list of these buildings in the former district of Corby in Northamptonshire, now part of the unitary authority area of North Northamptonshire.

== List of buildings ==
Name	Location	Type	Completed (Note: The date given is the date used by Historic England as significant for the initial building or that of an important part in the structure's description.)	Date designated	Grid ref. (Note: Sometimes known as OSGB36, the grid reference is based on the British national grid reference system used by the Ordnance Survey.) Geo-coordinates	Entry number (Note: The "List Entry Number" is a unique number assigned to each listed building and scheduled monument by Historic England.)	Image
The Bury House	Cottingham	Country house	Late 17th century	25 October 1951	SP8439490053; 52°30′07″N 0°45′29″W	1372572	Upload Photo
Church of St Leonard	Rockingham	Parish church	13th century	25 February 1957	SP8667091447; 52°30′51″N 0°43′27″W	1286197	Church of St Leonard More images
Curtain wall, gates and gatepiers attached to and approx. 50 metres north and west of Rockingham Castle	Rockingham	Gate	18th century	6 March 1987	SP8661491356; 52°30′48″N 0°43′30″W	1051710	Curtain wall, gates and gatepiers attached to and approx. 50 metres north and west of Rockingham Castle More images
Wall and steps attached to laundry and encircling the Rose Garden, Rockingham Castle	Rockingham	Wall	Mainly 17th and 18th century	6 March 1987	SP8669891266; 52°30′45″N 0°43′26″W	1372553	Upload Photo
Wall approx. 10 metres south of garden front, Rockingham Castle	Rockingham	Wall	17th/18th century	6 March 1987	SP8666891277; 52°30′45″N 0°43′28″W	1193462	Upload Photo
Haunt Hill House	Weldon	House	1636	25 October 1951	SP9252389283; 52°29′37″N 0°38′19″W	1285917	Upload Photo
The Manor House	Weldon	Manor house	Mid-16th–late 17th century	25 October 1951	SP9309689534; 52°29′45″N 0°37′49″W	1051693	The Manor House
Church of St John the Baptist	Corby	Parish church	Late 12th century	17 March 1953	SP8983788772; 52°29′22″N 0°40′42″W	1372547	Church of St John the Baptist More images
Church of St Michael	Great Oakley	Parish church	13th century	25 February 1957	SP8712485851; 52°27′49″N 0°43′09″W	1372544	Church of St Michael More images
Great Oakley Hall and attached Gazebo	Great Oakley	Country house	c.1555	25 October 1951	SP8715285902; 52°27′51″N 0°43′07″W	1372545	Great Oakley Hall and attached Gazebo More images

== See also ==
- Grade I listed buildings in Northamptonshire
- Grade II* listed buildings in Northamptonshire
  - Grade II* listed buildings in Daventry (district)
  - Grade II* listed buildings in East Northamptonshire
  - Grade II* listed buildings in Kettering (borough)
  - Grade II* listed buildings in Northampton
  - Grade II* listed buildings in South Northamptonshire
  - Grade II* listed buildings in Wellingborough (borough)
