= Thorpe Underwood =

Thorpe Underwood may refer to the following places:

- Thorpe Underwood, Northamptonshire
- Thorpe Underwood, North Yorkshire
