= William Maunsell =

Irish Anglican priest

William Maunsell (born in Limerick 1 October 1729 – died Thorpe Malsor 22 March 1818) was an Anglican priest in Ireland during the second half of the 18th and first decades of the 19th centuries, most notably Archdeacon of Kildare from 1772 until his death.

Maunsell was educated at Trinity College, Dublin and was appointed Precentor of Kildare Cathedral in 1766.

He married Lucy Oliver in 1780 and his second son was William Maunsell (Archdeacon of Limerick) (1782-1860)
