= Grade II* listed buildings in Northamptonshire =

Northamptonshire shown within England

The ceremonial county of Northamptonshire is divided into two unitary authorities North Northamptonshire and West Northamptonshire. Up until 31 March 2021, Northamptonshire was divided into seven districts.

The districts of Corby, East Northamptonshire, Kettering, Wellingborough merged to form North Northamptonshire. The districts of Daventry, Northampton and South Northamptonshire merged to form West Northamptonshire.

As there are 368 Grade II* listed buildings in the county they have been split into separate lists for each former district.

- North Northamptonshire
  - Grade II* listed buildings in Corby
  - Grade II* listed buildings in East Northamptonshire
  - Grade II* listed buildings in Kettering (borough)
  - Grade II* listed buildings in Wellingborough (borough)
- West Northamptonshire
  - Grade II* listed buildings in Daventry (district)
  - Grade II* listed buildings in Northampton
  - Grade II* listed buildings in South Northamptonshire

== See also ==
- Grade I listed buildings in Northamptonshire
- Category:Grade II* listed buildings in Northamptonshire
