= Samuel Morland =

17th-century English polymath (1625–1695)

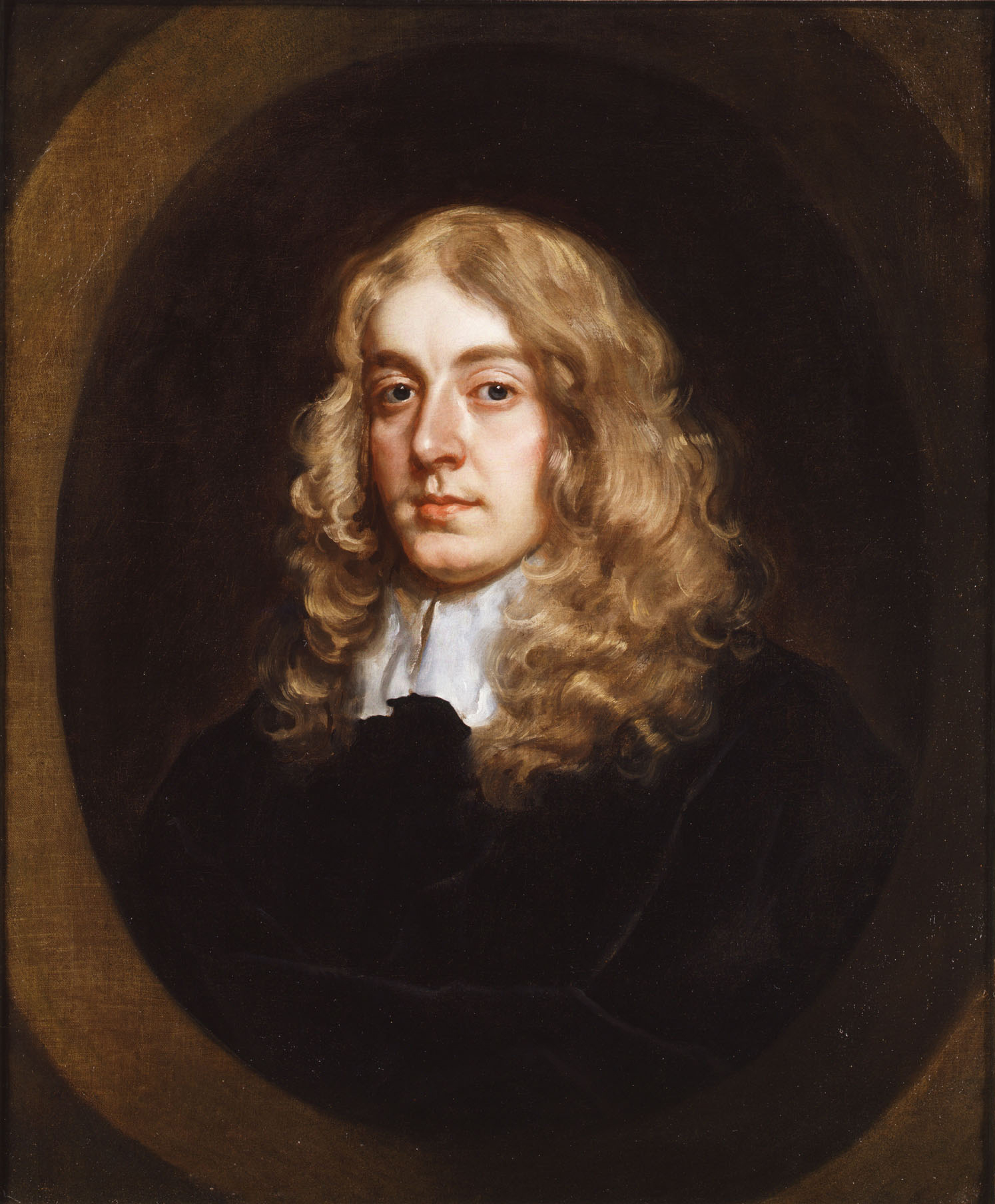
- Portrait of Morland by Peter Lely, 1645
- Born: 1625; Berkshire
- Died: 30 December 1695 (aged 70); Hammersmith, London
- Resting place: St Paul's Church, Hammersmith
- Other name: Samuel Moreland
- Spouses: Susanne de Milleville (m. 1657; died 1668) Carola Harsnett (m. 1670; died 1674) Ann Feilding (m. 1676; died 1680) Mary Ayliffe (m. 1687; div. 1688)
- Parent: Thomas Morland

Sir Samuel Morland, 1st Baronet (1625 – 30 December 1695), or Moreland, was an English academic, diplomat, spy, inventor and mathematician of the 17th century, a polymath credited with early developments in relation to computing, hydraulics and steam power.

== Early life ==
Samuel Morland was born in 1625 in Berkshire to Thomas Morland, rector of Sulhamstead Bannister.

Morland was educated at Winchester College and Magdalene College, Cambridge, where he became a Fellow in 1649. Devoting much time to the study of mathematics, Morland also became an accomplished Latinist and was proficient in Greek, Hebrew and French – then the language of culture and diplomacy. While he was a tutor at Cambridge, he first encountered Samuel Pepys who became a lifelong acquaintance.

== Diplomat ==
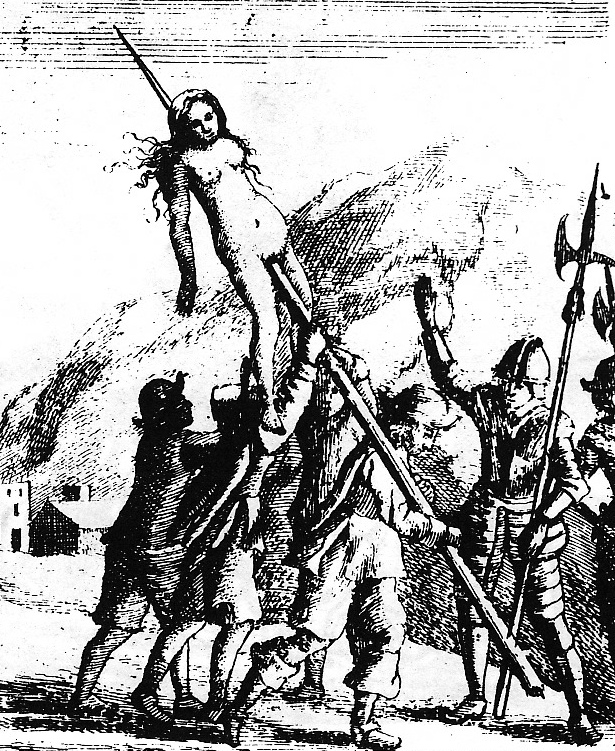
Print illustrating the 1655 massacre in La Torre, from Morland's History of the Evangelical Churches of the Valleys of Piedmont (1658)

A keen follower of public affairs, he left Cambridge and entered public service. He undertook a trip to Sweden in 1653, and in 1655 was sent by Oliver Cromwell on a mission to Italy to protest at actions taken against the Waldensians by the Duke of Savoy. He remained in Geneva for some time in an ambassadorial role, and also wrote a book: The History of the Evangelical Churches of the Valleys of Piemont, published in London in 1658.

== Spy ==
While he was serving as secretary to John Thurloe, a Commonwealth official in charge of espionage, Morland became disillusioned with the Government of the Commonwealth, allegedly after learning of a plot by Sir Richard Willis, Thurloe and Richard Cromwell to assassinate the future king Charles II. As a double agent, Morland began to work towards the Restoration, engaging in espionage and cryptography, activities that later helped him enter the king's service. In the 1660s he may have invented columnar transposition, an encryption technique which became very popular in 19th and 20th centuries.

== Inventor ==
On 18 July 1660 he was created a baronet and given a minor role at court, but his principal source of income came from applying his knowledge of mathematics and hydraulics to construct and maintain various machines. These included:

- "water-engines", an early kind of water pump. He was, for example, engaged on projects to improve the water supply to Windsor Castle, during which time he patented (c. 1675) a 'plunger pump' capable of "raising great quantities of water with far less proportion of strength than can be performed by a Chain or other Pump." He also experimented with using gunpowder to make a vacuum that would suck in water (in effect the first internal combustion engine) and worked on ideas for a steam engine. Morland's pumps were developed for numerous domestic, marine and industrial applications, such as wells, draining ponds or mines, and fire fighting. His calculation of the volume of steam (approximately two thousand times that of water) was not improved upon until the later part of the next century, and was of importance for the future development of a working steam engine.
- a non-decimal adding machine (working with English pounds, shillings, pence, and farthings), similar to the Ciclografo of the Italian Tito Livio Burattini and made by Humphry Adamson
- a machine that made trigonometric calculations

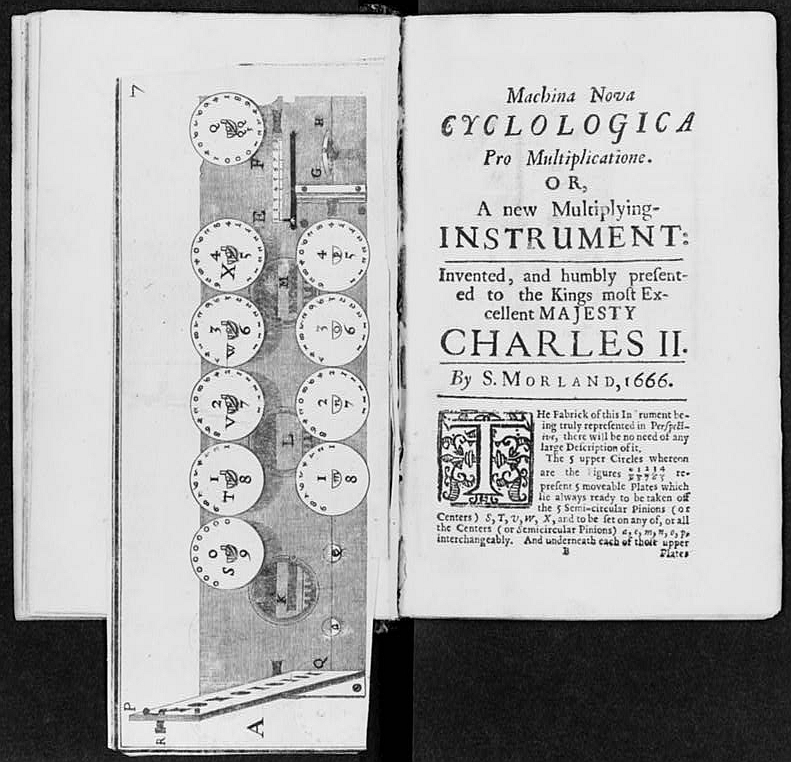
"A new Multiplying Instrument" invented by Morland in 1666

- an 'arithmetical machine' by which the four fundamental rules of arithmetic were readily worked "without charging the memory, disturbing the mind, or exposing the operations to any uncertainty" (regarded by some as the world's first multiplying machine, an example is in the Science Museum in South Kensington).
- in 1666 he also obtained a patent for making metal fire-hearths
- in 1671 he claimed credit for inventing the speaking trumpet, an early form of megaphone. One of only eight known surviving examples is displayed at the parish church of St Peter and St Paul at Harrington, Northamptonshire. The device, also known as "The Harrington Vamping Horn", was demonstrated to Charles II in St James's Park.
- he later won a contract to provide mirrors to the king and to erect and maintain the king’s printing press.
- in 1681 he was appointed magister mechanicorum (master of mechanics) to the king for his work on the water system at Windsor.
- he also corresponded with Pepys about naval gun-carriages, designed a machine to weigh ship's anchors, developed new forms of barometers, and designed a cryptographic machine.

== Personal life and family ==
From 1677 he lived in the Vauxhall area of central London, where he made improvements to New Spring Gardens which later became Vauxhall Gardens. In 1684 he moved to a house in Lower Mall, Hammersmith.

Morland married three times:

- In 1657 he married the Huguenot Susanne de Milleville, daughter of Daniel de Milleville, baron de Boissay; they had three children. She died in 1668.
- In 1670 he married Carola Harsnett, daughter of Sir Roger Harsnett; they had two children. She died in 1674.
- In 1676 he married Ann Feilding of Solihull, sister of Beau Feilding. There was no issue, and she died in 1680.
- In 1687 he married Mary Ayliffe. A con-woman, who tricked him into believing she was an heiress, and notoriously profligate, he divorced her for adultery in 1688.

There are monuments to two of Morland's three wives in the nave of Westminster Abbey.

Morland began to go blind, losing his sight in about 1692.

Morland died on 30 December 1695 in Hammersmith. Morland was buried on 6 January 1696, in St Paul's Church, Hammersmith.

== See also ==
- History of the internal combustion engine

Baronetage of England
| New creation | Baronet (of Sulhamstead Banister); 1660–1695 | Succeeded by Samuel Morland |
