= Morland baronets =

Title in the Baronetage of England

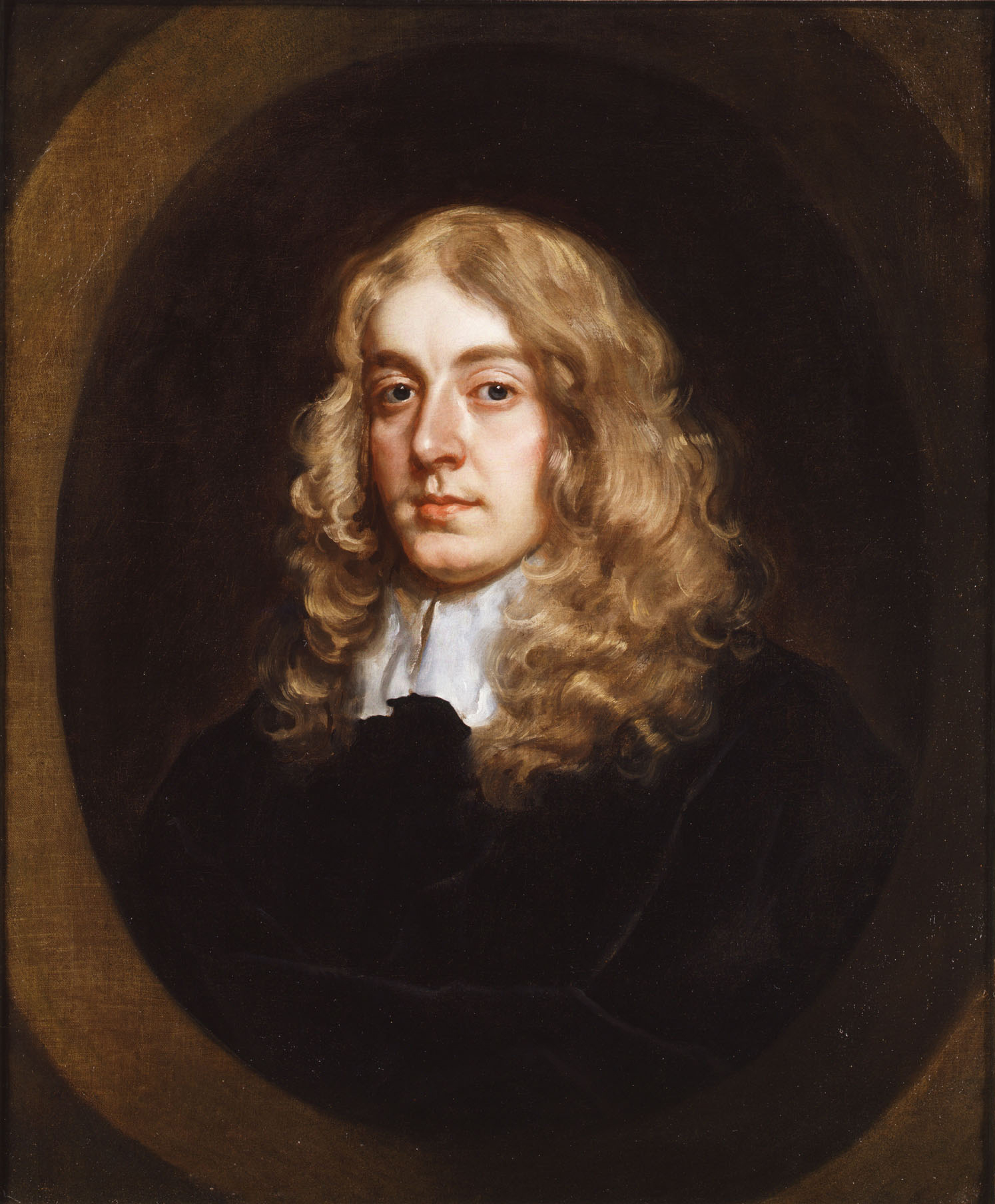
Painting of Sir Samuel Morland, 1st Baronet, by Peter Lely

The Morland Baronetcy, of Sulhamstead Banister in the County of Berkshire, was a title in the Baronetage of England. It was created on 18 July 1660 for the academic, diplomat, spy, inventor, and mathematician Samuel Morland. The title became extinct on the death of the second Baronet in 1716.

== Morland baronets, of Sulhamstead Banister (1660) ==
- Sir Samuel Morland, 1st Baronet (1625–1695)
- Sir Samuel Morland, 2nd Baronet (died 1716)
