= Action of 11 July 1804 =

Coordinates: 43.1326°N 6.3727°E

- Part of the Napoleonic Wars
Date	11 July 1804
Location	Bay of Hiérès, off Le Lavandou
Result	British victory

Belligerents
United Kingdom	France

Commanders and leaders
Lt. John Thompson	

Strength
10 ship's boats	12 settees, supported by shore battery

Casualties and losses
4 killed 23 wounded	11 settees burnt 1 settee captured

The action of 11 July 1804 was a minor naval engagement fought between the Royal Navy and the French Imperial Navy in the Bay of Hiérès, off Le Lavandou. On 11 July, at night, 10 boats belonging to the Royal Navy frigates Narcissus, Seahorse, and Maidstone, under the orders of Lieutenant John Thompson, attacked 12 French settees, lying at Lavandou, in Hiérès Bay, moored with chains to the beach, and covered by a battery of three guns. The British force destroyed most of the French small craft, but at great cost.

== Opposing forces ==
=== British ===
- HMS Narcissus, Capt. Ross Donnelly
- HMS Seahorse, Capt. Courtenay Boyle
- HMS Maidstone, Capt. George Elliot
  - 10 ship's boats, Lt. John Thompson, of the Narcissus, with Lts. John Richard Lumley, Ogle Moore, and Hyde Parker, mates, and Midn. Robert Maunsell, Samuel Spencer, William Walker, John George Victor, and *** Hamilton

=== French ===
- 12 settees
- 3-gun shore battery

== Battle ==
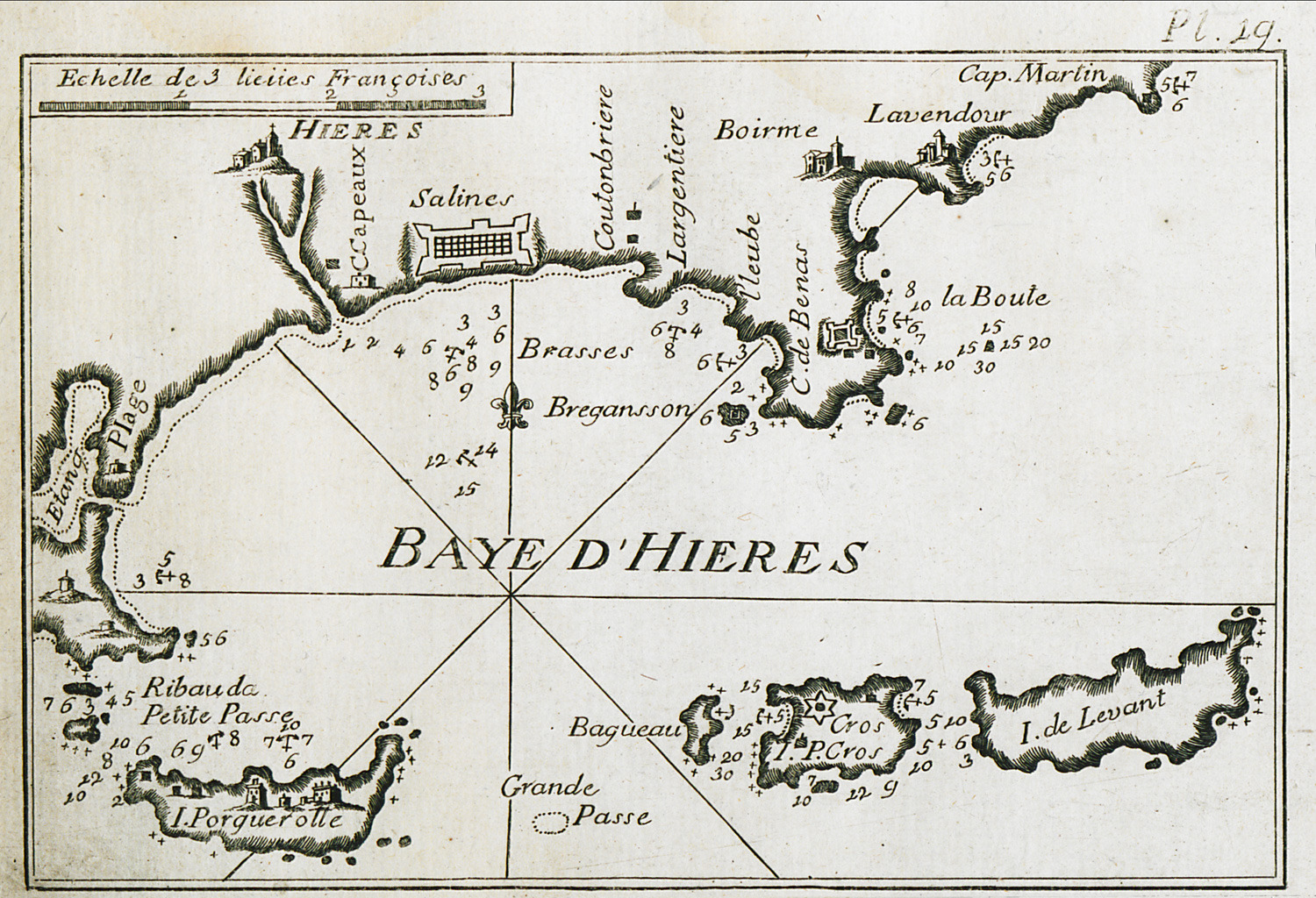
Map of the Bay of Hiérès, 1804

On 11 July, at 10 p.m., ten boats of the Royal Navy frigates Narcissus, 32 guns, Captain Ross Donnelly, Seahorse, 38 guns, Captain Courtenay Boyle, and Maidstone, 32 guns, Captain George Elliot, forming part of Lord Nelson's squadron blockading Toulon, attacked a dozen small French craft (also identified as settees) at Lavandou (La Vandour) in Hiérès Bay.

The French were fully prepared, and received the British boats, which were under the orders of Lieutenants John Thompson, John Richard Lumley, Ogle Moore, and Hyde Parker, with a tremendous fire. About or just before midnight, under fire from the settees and the troops on shore, the French vessels were boarded, and all, except one, which was brought off, set on fire.

== Casualties ==
The British force was led and handled in a manner which won warm praise from Nelson, and destroyed most of the French small craft, but only with terrible loss. Thomas Owen Roche, midshipman, two seamen, and one marine, were killed; and Lieutenant Lumley (lost an arm), Robert Maunsell, mate, Thomas W. Bedingfield, Thomas A. Watt, and John G. Victor, midshipmen, fifteen seamen, and three marines, wounded. Most of the above officers received swords or other testimonials of their gallantry from the Patriotic Fund. "Wounds", said Nelson in a general order on this affair, "are marks of honour; they must be expected."

== Sources ==
- Allen, Joseph (1852). Battles of the British Navy. Vol. 2 (New ed.). London: Henry G. Bohn. pp. 86–7.
- Clowes, W. Laird (1900). The Royal Navy: A History from the Earliest Times to the Present. Vol. 5. London: S. Low, Marston & Co. Ltd. pp. 345–6.
- James, William (1826). The Naval History of Great Britain. Vol. 3 (New ed.). London: Harding, Lepard, and Co. p. 392.
- Nicolas, Nicholas Harris (1846). The Dispatches and Letters of Vice Admiral Lord Viscount Nelson. Vol. 6. London: Henry Colburn. p. 108.
- "Gazette Letters". The Naval Chronicle. Vol. 12. London: I. Gold. 1805. p. 316.
