= Oxwich Castle =

Manor house in Gower, Swansea, Wales

Coordinates: 51.55463°N 4.16791°W

- Castell Oxwich (Welsh) (Note: Since 2024, Cadw, who care for the site, use the Welsh name only.)
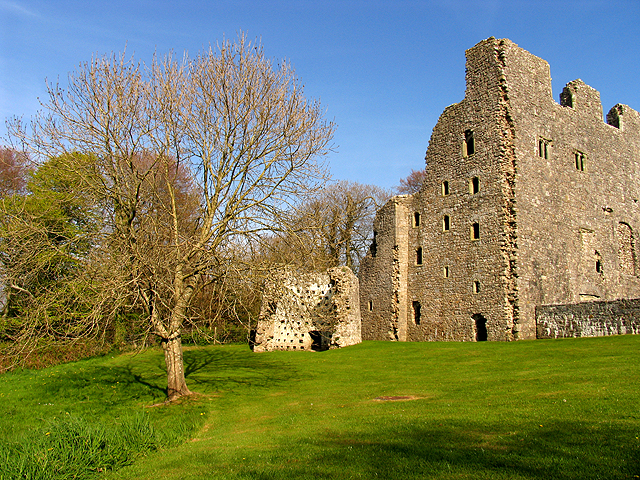
- Oxwich Castle and dovecote
- Interactive map of the Oxwich Castle area

General information
- Location: Gower Peninsula, Swansea, Wales

Website
- Castell Oxwich (Cadw)

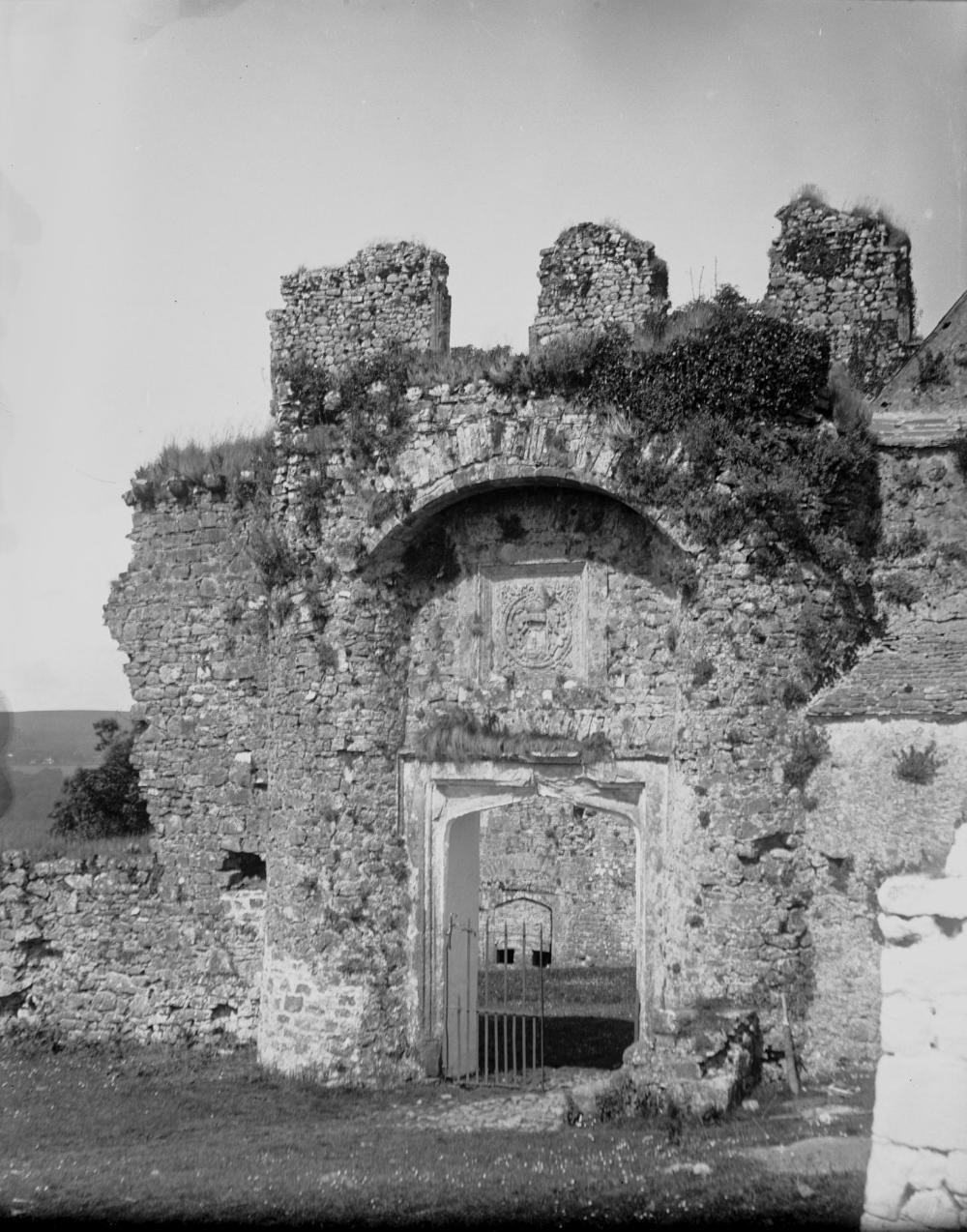
Oxwich castle entrance; c. 1910s

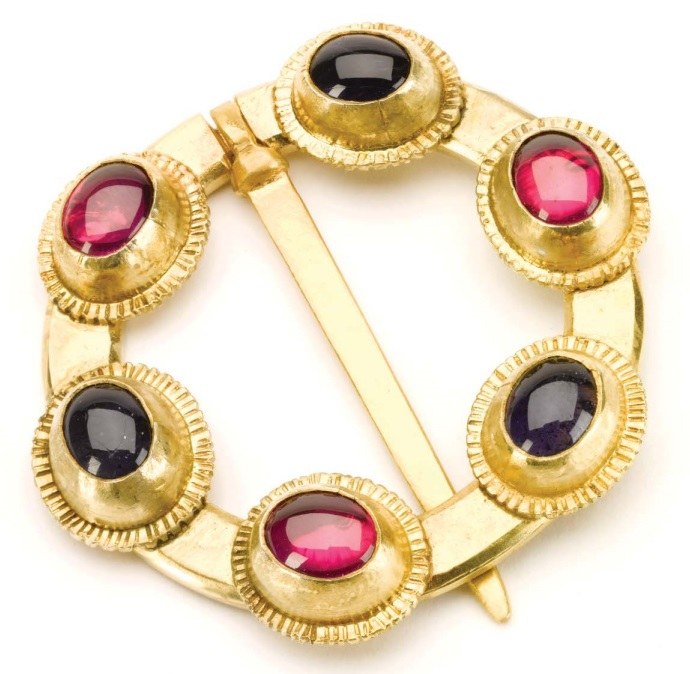
Modern replica of the original Oxwich Brooch

Oxwich Castle (Welsh: Castell Oxwich) is a Grade I listed castle which occupies a position on a wooded headland overlooking Oxwich Bay on the Gower Peninsula, Wales. Although it may occupy the site of an earlier fortification, it is a castle in name only as it is a grand Tudor fortified manor house built in courtyard style.

== Castle ==
A charter of 1306 granted in Swansea refers to tenants of "the ancient knight's fees" (that is, military tenants) at Oxwich, and this indicates that there may have been some fortifications on the site before the present castle. At this time Oxwich was owned by the de Penres family, who had been in possession since the 1230s. However, with the exception of a ruined tower to the north-east of the castle, which may predate the Tudor building, (and may be the "castrum de Oxenwych" mentioned in a document of 1459) nothing remains of any earlier works.

The existing buildings were largely created in the 16th century. They consist of a Gateway (built 1520–1538) leading to a courtyard, a Hall at the east of the courtyard opposite the Gateway (1559–1580) and a South Range (1520–38). At the corner of the Hall and the South Range is the six-story South-East Tower. To the north-east of the Castle are the remains of a large stone dovecote.

The Gateway is surmounted by a plaque with the coats of arms of the Mansell family and the Penrice and Scurlage families to which Sir Rhys was related. The East Range carried a large Hall, and, with the South-East Tower to which it was connected, provided extensive accommodation. It is possible that the construction of this range may have led to the bankruptcy of its builder, Sir Edward Mansell. The South Range contained a kitchen.

== History ==
Oxwich was originally built by Sir Rice Mansel (d. 1559), who also owned Old Beaupre Castle. The structure was built over the original ruined castle, the residence of the Norman de la Mare family during the 13th and 14th century. His son, Sir Edward Mansel (d. 1595) succeeded to the property and between 1560 and 1580 created a much grander structure, called the Great House, capable of housing a large number of guests and retainers. It was a leading example in Wales of the Elizabethan prodigy house. By 1632 however the Castle was already leased out by the Mansell family. Parts of the building collapsed in the eighteenth century. Following this, parts of the South Range were rebuilt and it continued to be used as a farmhouse into the 20th century. In 1949 the Castle was threatened with demolition but was saved and given to the State. The building is now in the care of Cadw.

Since 2024, Cadw have used the Welsh name Castell Oxwich in English, as part of an effort to standardise the names in both languages.

== Oxwich Brooch ==
During maintenance works at the Castle in 1968, a gold brooch was discovered by Cyril Grove, which is a rare fine example of medieval British jewellery. The brooch is in the form of a gold ring with mounts, of the period 1320–1340, two inches in diameter. It is set with three rubies and three cameos; it is believed that the cameos were added at a later date and that the brooch may have originally contained sapphires. It may once have been part of the treasure of Edward II or an heirloom of the Mansel family. The brooch is now on display at the National Museum Cardiff.
