= Cranford St John SSSI =

Protected area in Northamptonshire, England

Coordinates: 52.378°N 0.645°W

Cranford St John
- Site of Special Scientific Interest
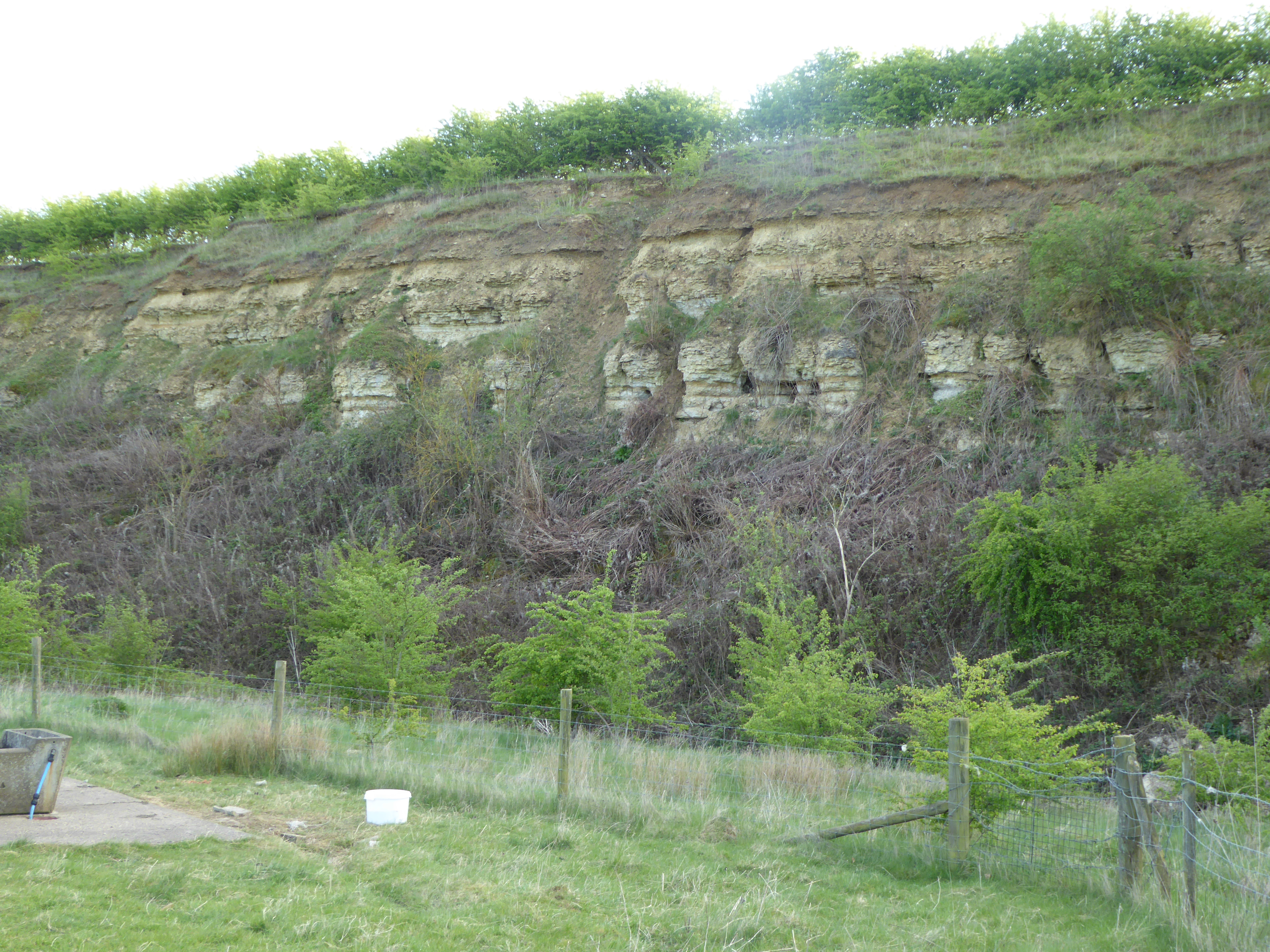
- Location of Cranford St John.
- Area of search: Northamptonshire
- Grid reference: SP 923 764
- Interest: Geological
- Area: 2.8 hectares
- Notification date: 1987
- Location map: Magic Map

Cranford St John SSSI is a 2.8-hectare (6.9-acre) geological Site of Special Scientific Interest in Cranford St John, east of Kettering in Northamptonshire. It is a Geological Conservation Review site.

This former quarry exposes rocks from the Rutland Formation and up to nearly the top of the White Limestone Formation, dating to the Middle Jurassic Bathonian stage, 169 to 166 million years ago. The site is the type section for a freshwater clay bed which is thought to result from a widespread storm deposit.

There is no access to the site, but the southern end can be viewed from a footpath from Cranford St John.
