= Action of 31 July 1811 =

Minor naval engagement

- Part of the invasion of Java
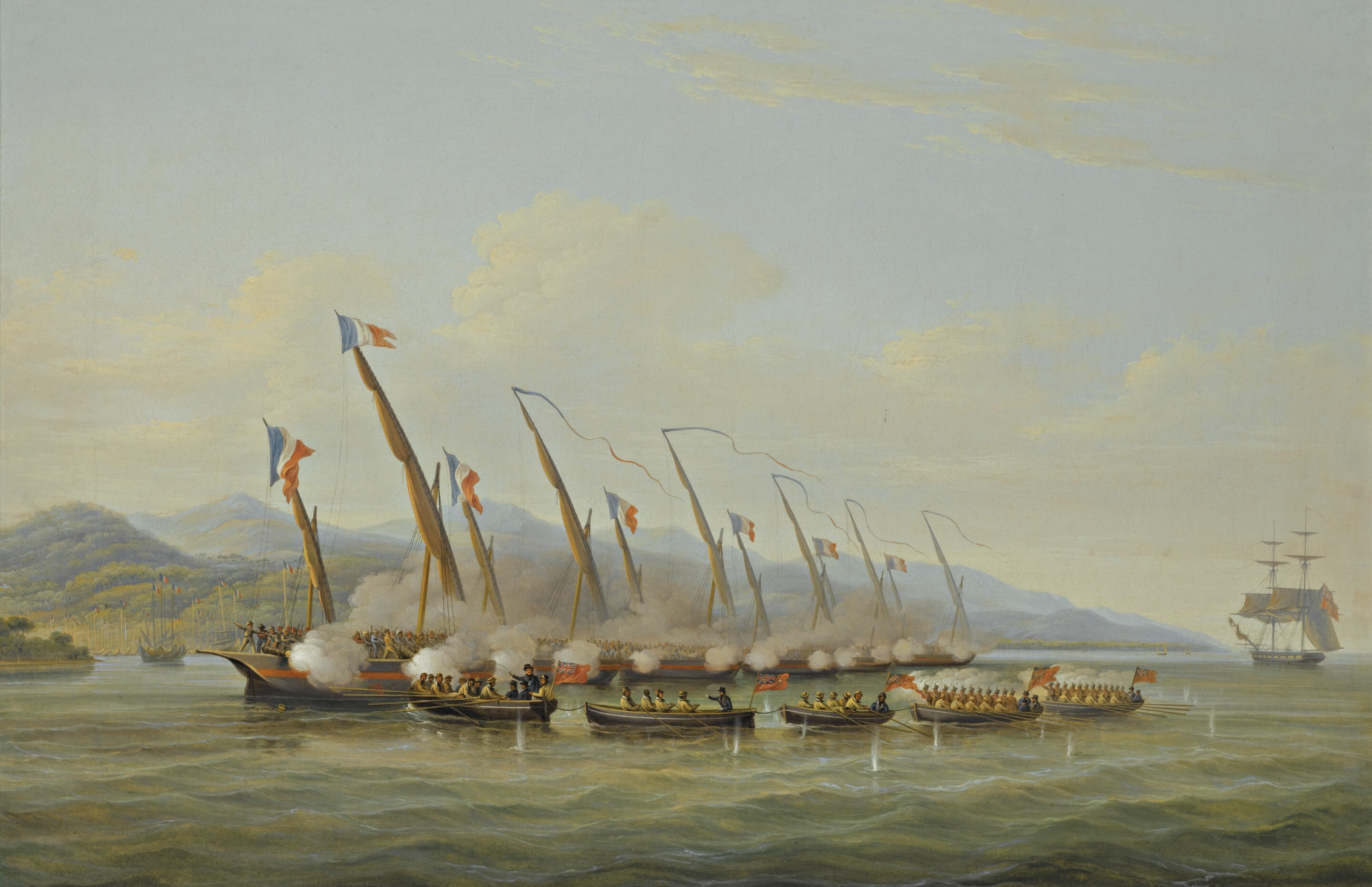
- Painting of the action by William John Huggins
Date	31 July 1811
Location	Indramayo River, Java
Result	British victory

Belligerents
United Kingdom	France

Commanders and leaders
Robert Maunsell	

Strength
ship's boats of the Procris; 2 flat boats	6 gun-boats

Casualties and losses
11 wounded	5 gun-boats captured 1 gun-boat destroyed

The action of 31 July 1811 was a minor naval engagement fought between the Royal Navy and the French Imperial Navy during the British invasion of Java in 1811.

On 31 July 1811, Commander Maunsell of the sloop the Procris discovered a convoy of 40 or 50 proas, escorted by six French gun-boats in the mouth of the Indramayo river. Launching boats they were able to board and capture five of the French gun-boats in quick succession; the sixth blew up. Meanwhile, however, the convoy escaped up the shallow muddy river.

== Events ==
On 31 July, at daybreak, the 18-gun brig-sloop Procris, Commander Robert Maunsell, being off the mouth of the Indramayo river, Java, came in sight of six French gun-boats with a convoy of proas. The Procris stood after the enemy until prevented by the shoal water from getting nearer; when Maunsell proceeded to attack them in the boats of his brig, accompanied by two flat boats, each containing twenty soldiers of the 14th and 29th regiments.

Commander Maunsell was accompanied by Lieutenant George Marjoribanks, and Lieutenants H. J. Heyland, of the 14th, and Oliver Brush, of the 89th regiments; also George Cunningham, William Eandall, and Charles Davies, masters' mates.

On nearing the gun-boats, a heavy fire was opened on the British boats, but five out of the six gun-boats were boarded and carried, and the other blown up. The vessels each mounted two brass guns: 32-pounder carronades forward, and long eighteens aft; and had crews of sixty men.

The wounded in the British boats were: one man dangerously, two severely, and eight, including Eandall, slightly. Maunsell honourably mentioned the officers present with him on the occasion.

== Sources ==
- Allen, Joseph (1852). Battles of the British Navy. Vol. 2 (New ed.). London: Henry G. Bohn. pp. 328–9.
- Clowes, Wm. Laird (1900). The Royal Navy: A History from the Earliest Times to the Present. Vol. 5. Sampson, Low, Marston and Co. pp. 299–300.
