= Thorpe Underwood, Northamptonshire =

Hamlet in Northamptonshire, England

Coordinates: 52.4222°N 0.8496°W

Thorpe Underwood
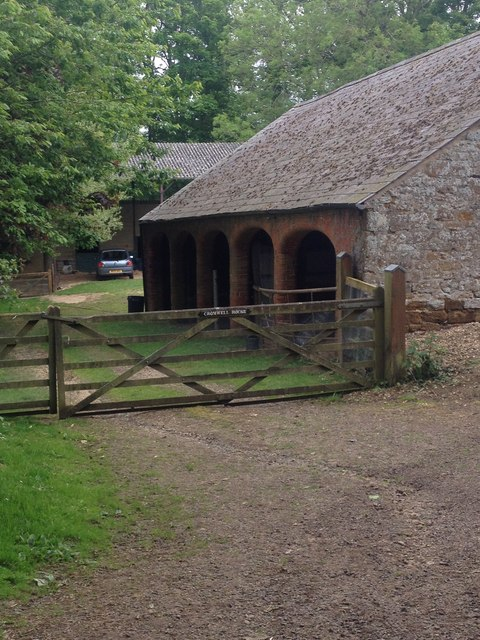
- Thorpe Underwood Farm

- Location within Northamptonshire
- OS grid reference: SP783810
- Civil parish: Harrington
- Unitary authority: North Northamptonshire
- Ceremonial county: Northamptonshire
- Region: East Midlands
- Country: England
- Sovereign state: United Kingdom
- Post town: Northampton
- Postcode district: NN6
- Dialling code: 01536
- Police: Northamptonshire
- Fire: Northamptonshire
- Ambulance: East Midlands
- UK Parliament: Kettering

Thorpe Underwood is a hamlet in the civil parish of Harrington, in the North Northamptonshire district, in the ceremonial county of Northamptonshire, England. In 1870-72 it had a population of 22. Thorpe Underwood was possibly a DMV.
