= Cranford St John =

Village in Northamptonshire, England

Coordinates: 52.38240°N 0.64267°W

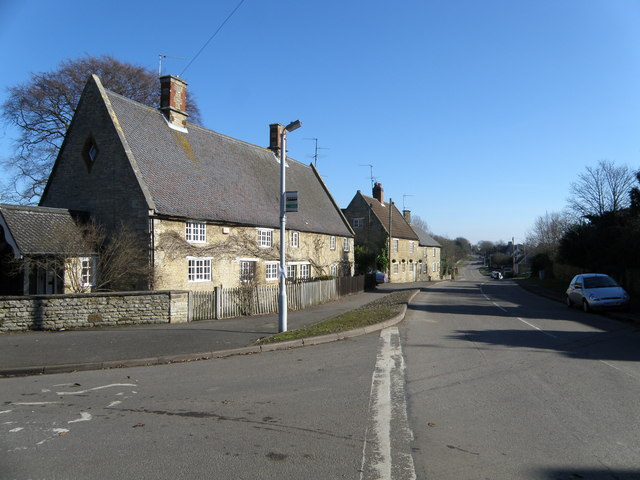

- Location within Northamptonshire
- OS grid reference: SP924769
- Civil parish: Cranford
- Unitary authority: North Northamptonshire
- Ceremonial county: Northamptonshire
- Region: East Midlands
- Country: England
- Sovereign state: United Kingdom
- Post town: Kettering
- Postcode district: NN14
- Dialling code: 01536
- Police: Northamptonshire
- Fire: Northamptonshire
- Ambulance: East Midlands
- UK Parliament: Kettering

Cranford St John is a village and former civil parish, now in the parish of Cranford, in the North Northamptonshire district, in the ceremonial county of Northamptonshire, England. It is in the southern half of the parish of Cranford, next to Cranford St Andrew – both named after the two parish churches. The two settlements are divided by the Alledge Brook, a tributary of the River Nene; the derivation of the name is "ford frequented by cranes or herons". In 1931 the parish had a population of 239. On 1 April 1935 the parish was abolished to form "Cranford".

The only public house left is the Red Lion in Cranford St John. The old station house is the station building of the Kettering to Cambridge standard gauge railway that used to run along the side of the village.

The Church was largely built in the thirteenth century, including the tower, but there is an early Norman archway in the north arcade, possibly moved from the original tower, and the rest of the arcade is late twelfth century. The south aisle was built in 1842.

The former Sunday school has been converted into a residence.

== Quarrying ==
Cranford St John SSSI is a geological Site of Special Scientific Interest which exposes rocks dating to the Jurassic period. It is the remains of an iron ore quarry which closed in 1969 and was the last of the iron ore quarries in the area. Limestone and, more especially, iron ore were once quarried extensively in the area. Much of the quarried ground is now covered by the new A14 road. The limestone and ore was taken from the quarries and mines by tramway to two sidings on the railway for transport to iron works elsewhere. One of the sidings was close to the east of the station. The other was further away to the west. The limestone quarries were to the south east and south west of the village, on the south side of the railway. They operated between 1880 and 1894.

The iron ore quarries to the west of the village began in 1878 on the north side of the railway and were extended south of the railway in 1880. Quarrying on these sites ceased 1897, and in 1909 ore was obtained by tunnelling at a number of locations into the quarry sides. These adits enabled mining to be done by the "pillar and stall method" until 1913. Later, parts of the mine collapsed leaving some depressions called sink holes in the ground above. To the east of the village iron ore quarrying took place north of the railway between 1899 and 1909 and south of the old main road from 1900 to 1969. This quarry worked its way westward and to the south of the village.

It is unclear whether the tramways associated with the quarries and mine used horses or steam locomotives to start with. Certainly from 1889 steam locomotives were used except inside the mine. The wagons were hauled out of the mine at Cranford St Andrew by a stationary steam engine with an endless cable attached to the wagons. The engine house was situated to the west of the village of Cranford St John close to the railway. The engine house chimney was demolished during the building of the A14 road (which was built on a large section of the old railway line by Cranford) in May 1989.

In 1889 the tramways were metre gauge. The remaining tramway was converted to standard gauge in 1923. The quarries and the mine were at first worked by hand but steam quarrying machines were introduced in 1918. Diesel machines were introduced from 1930 and electric from 1940 but right up to 1969 one of the steam machines was in use.
