= St Peter & St Paul's Church, Harrington =

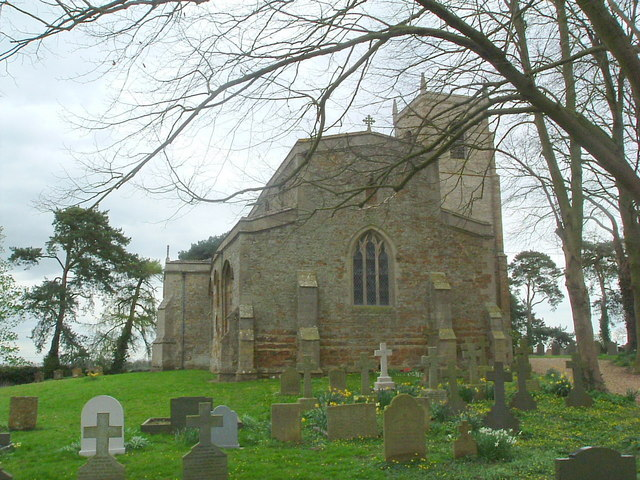
- St Peter & St Paul's Church, Harrington
- 52.4176°N 0.8569°W
- Denomination: Church of England
- Website: http://www.faxtongroup.org.uk/stpeterandstpaulharrington.htm

Administration
- Province: Canterbury
- Diocese: Diocese of Peterborough
- Archdeaconry: Northampton
- Deanery: Brixworth

Clergy
- Rector: Rev Canon Mary Garbutt

St Peter & St Paul's Church is an Anglican Church and the parish church of Harrington.

== History ==
It is a Grade II* listed building and stands on the east side of Church Lane, to the north-east of the village of Harrington.

There is no reference to a church or priest in the entry for the parish in the Domesday Book, which was compiled in 1086. This may indicate the absence of a church building at that stage or, alternatively, only the absence of a resident priest.

The main structure of the present building was erected in the 14th and 15th centuries. Its tower was built in 1809. The church consists of a nave, north and south aisles, north transept, chancel, south porch and south tower. A detailed description appears on the Historic England website

The church displays a tuba stentoro-phonica, or a speaking trumpet, one of only eight in the country. Sir Samuel Morland claimed to have invented these horns, for speaking between ships. The device, also known as "The Harrington Vamping Horn", was demonstrated to Charles II in St James' Park. In 1817, the Earl of Dysart gave to the church a ring of six bells, which were cast in the Whitechapel Bell Foundry.

The parish registers survive from 1673 and, apart from those currently in use, are kept at Northamptonshire Record Office. Details of its location and opening times can be found on the Record Office website.

Harrington is part of a united Benefice along with Arthingworth, East Farndon, and Oxendon. Each parish retains its own church building.

The ecologist Adrian Woodruffe-Peacock was curate here from 1886 to 1890.
