= Cransley Hall =

Country house in Cransley, Northamptonshire, England

Coordinates: 52.3813°N 0.7837°W

Cransley Hall

Cransley Hall is a Grade II* listed country manor house in the village of Great Cransley, near Kettering in Northamptonshire. It is set in its own grounds which include a lake created by monks in the fifteenth century. Originally built in around 1580, the Hall has over fifteen bedrooms and ornately decorated reception rooms, including Italianate plasterwork in the dining room.

The Hall was originally built by Dame Alice Owen, widowed three times, latterly to Judge Thomas Owen. Following his death she left her home in Islington, London, and moved to Cransley Hall. Owen also founded Dame Alice Owen's School.

The Hall bears the arms of later owners, Sir Thomas Cecil (c.1595) and Sir Henry Robinson (d. 1727).

It passed to the Rose family in 1791, remaining in their hands till 1904.

== See also ==
Dame Alice Owen's School
