= Cranford, Northamptonshire =

Civil parish in Northamptonshire, England

Coordinates: 52.3877°N 0.6422°W

Cranford
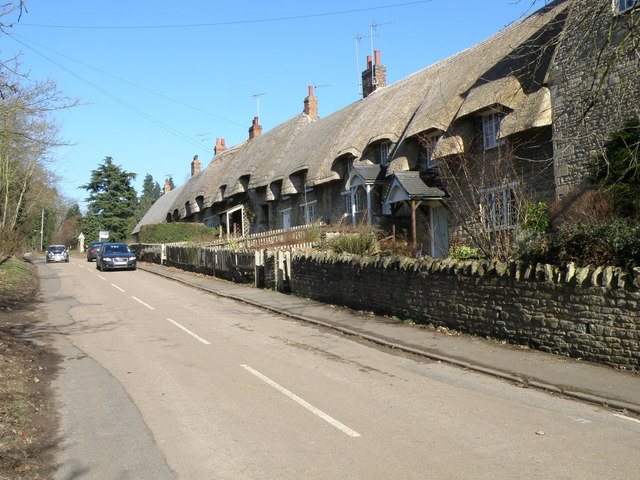
- Cranford St Andrew

- Location within Northamptonshire
- Population: 422 (2011)
- OS grid reference: SP9277
- Unitary authority: North Northamptonshire
- Ceremonial county: Northamptonshire
- Region: East Midlands
- Country: England
- Sovereign state: United Kingdom
- Post town: Kettering
- Postcode district: NN14
- Dialling code: 01536
- Police: Northamptonshire
- Fire: Northamptonshire
- Ambulance: East Midlands
- UK Parliament: Kettering

Cranford is a civil parish in the North Northamptonshire district, in the ceremonial county of Northamptonshire, England. The two settlements in the parish are:

- Cranford St Andrew
- Cranford St John

At the time of the 2001 census, the parish population was 414 people, increasing to 422 at the 2011 census.

== History ==
The parish was formed on 1 April 1935 from "Cranford St Andrew", "Cranford St John" and part of Barton Seagrave. The name "Cranford" means 'Crane/heron ford'. Cranford was recorded in the Domesday Book as Craneford.
