= St Andrew's Church, Cranford =

Coordinates: 52.3857°N 0.6440°W

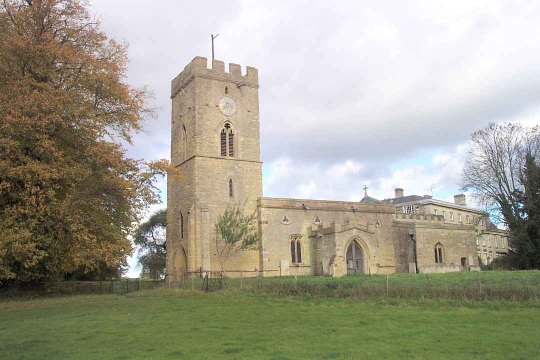
- St Andrew's Church, Cranford, from the southwest

- Location in Northamptonshire
- OS grid reference: SP 923 772
- Location: Cranford St Andrew, Northamptonshire
- Country: England
- Denomination: Anglican
- Website: Churches Conservation Trust

History
- Dedication: Saint Andrew

Architecture
- Functional status: Redundant
- Heritage designation: Grade II*
- Designated: 25 February 1957
- Architectural type: Church
- Style: Norman, Gothic, Gothic Revival
- Groundbreaking: 12th century
- Completed: 1847

Specifications
- Materials: Limestone with ironstone dressings, lead roofs

St Andrew's Church is a redundant Anglican church in Cranford St Andrew, Northamptonshire, England. It is recorded in the National Heritage List for England as a designated Grade II* listed building, and is under the care of the Churches Conservation Trust. The church stands in the park of Cranford Hall, to the southwest of the house.

== History ==
St Andrew's dates from the later part of the 12th century, the nave arcade surviving from that time. The tower was added during the following century, at which time the church was largely rebuilt, and a north chapel was added. Further building took place in the 14th century when the clerestory and porch were added, and new windows were inserted. The south chapel was added in the following century. In 1674 the south chapel was refaced with ashlar. In 1847 a north transept was added to form a family pew for the Robinsons of Cranford Hall. The church was vested in the Churches Conservation Trust on 1 December 1996.

== Architecture ==
=== Exterior ===
The church is constructed in limestone rubble, part of which is rendered, and some of the dressings are in ironstone. The roofs are covered in lead. Its plan consists of a nave with a clerestory, a north aisle, a south porch and a north transept, a chancel with north and south chapels, and a west tower. The tower is in two stages with a tall lower stage and supported by buttresses. In the lower stage is a steeply pointed west doorway, with a lancet window above it, and small stair lights to its left. On the south side is another lancet window. In the upper stage on each side are two-light bell openings with Decorated tracery and quatrefoil heads, over which are three plain corbels, and a lancet window. On the south side the central corbel is replaced by a clock face. On the summit of the tower is a castellated parapet.

There are also castellated parapets on the chancel and the porch, and plain parapets on the nave and chapels. In the south wall of the nave are a two-light square-headed Perpendicular window to the left of the porch, and a three-light window under a pointed arch on the right. In the wall of the south chapel is a doorway with an ogee head, over which is a stone dated 1674, and a two-light window. At the east end of the south chapel is a two-light window, the east window of the chancel contains a three-light Perpendicular window, and in the east wall of the north chapel is another three-light Perpendicular window. On the north side of the north chapel is a three-light window. The 19th-century north transept is in Perpendicular style. In the north aisle is a three-light window, and a two-light square-headed Perpendicular window.

=== Interior ===
The arcade between the nave and the north aisle is Norman in style and consists of three bays. The arches are round-headed and are carried on cylindrical piers with plain capitals. In the north chapel is a medieval piscina. The east window contains fragments of medieval and 17th-century glass. The pulpit dates from the 19th century and contains re-set 16th-century Flemish panels depicting biblical scenes. The font is octagonal and plain. In the church are memorials to members of the Fossebrok (or Fosbroke) and Robinson families. The two-manual organ was built in 1883 by Trustam & Co of Bedford. There is a ring of four bells. Two of these were cast in 1624 by William Haulsey, the third was cast in 1683 by Tobias III Norris, and the fourth dates from 1718 and was cast by Thomas I Eayre. In the 1930s, when the church was still in use, its plate was described as including a cup from about 1570, a paten of 1813, and flagon of 1835.

== See also ==
- List of churches preserved by the Churches Conservation Trust in the English Midlands
