= St John the Baptist Church, Corby =

Church in Northamptonshire, England

St John's Church, Corby
- Church of Saint John the Baptist, Corby
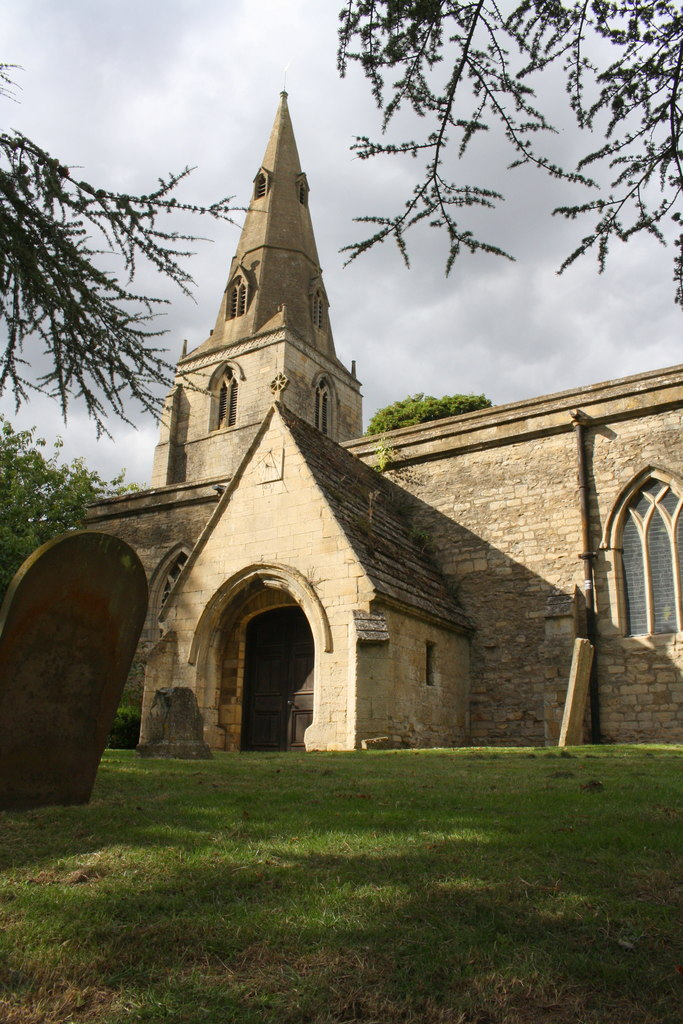
- The parish church of St John the Baptist in Corby

- Located in Northamptonshire
- 52.4895°N 0.6783°W
- Location: Corby, North Northamptonshire
- Country: England
- Denomination: Church of England
- Website: stjohnscorby.org.uk

History
- Status: Active
- Founded: 1217
- Dedication: All Saints
- Consecrated: 1217

Architecture
- Functional status: Parish church
- Heritage designation: Grade II*
- Designated: March 1953
- Architectural type: Perpendicular Gothic
- Style: Decorated Gothic
- Completed: 1217

Specifications
- Capacity: 400

Administration
- Province: Canterbury
- Diocese: Peterborough
- Parish: Corby

Clergy
- Vicar: Reverend Paul Frost

St John the Baptist Church is the oldest parish church in the town of Corby, Northamptonshire, England. It has been an active place of worship since the 1200s. It is a Grade II* listed building.

== History ==
The church congregation is believed to have existed since before the Domesday Book and for over 800 years. It has continued to build the importance of the church to the residents and other worshippers. A church was built on the site of the present-day church in the 1200s, possibly around 1217. This likely makes the church one of the oldest places of worship in the county of Northamptonshire.

A mention of the church was recorded in the book, A Topographical Dictionary of England by Samuel Lewis in 1842. The church and parish of Corby was given an entry on page 672. It mentions the church and parish as:

CORBY (ST. JOHN THE BAPTIST), a parish, in the union of Kettering, hundred of Corby, N.Division of the county of Northampton. The church is an ancient structure; the tower and chancel are of the later English style, and the nave of much earlier date.

— Samuel Lewis, A Topographical Dictionary of England

The 1848 edition of the declares the church to be built in the 14th century in decorated style.

The church bells were refurbished in 1933.

== Conservation area ==
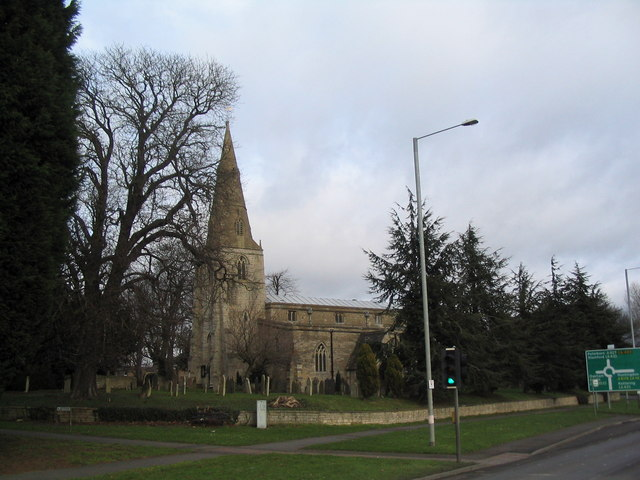
The church is part of the wider "Old Village" conservation area

The church forms part of the historical core of the old village of Corby. This conservation area is the heart of the town's historic roots. It remained a rural village until the 1930s, when the steel works and industrial revolution lead to a booming economy and huge increase in the then-village's population.

Following the end of the Second World War, Corby was designated as a new town under the New Towns Acts. New housing estates, retail parks and industrial estates were built around the church and the historic old village centre. Following this, the Old Village Conservation Area was established to protect the area and historical character of the historic village centre. This includes the church itself due to its importance to the town's religious and village life.

== Present day ==
The church continues to play an important role in Corby's Christian community and is also one of the town's many listed structures. It also hosts community events and works with other faith and secular groups to help and support the local community which includes supporting the Corby Foodbank through donations and support.

== Sources ==
- Lewis, Samuel (1848). "Corby (St. John the Baptist)". A-C. S. Lewis and Company. pp. 684–685.
