= Cranford St Andrew =

Village in Northamptonshire, England

Coordinates: 52.38673°N 0.64794°W

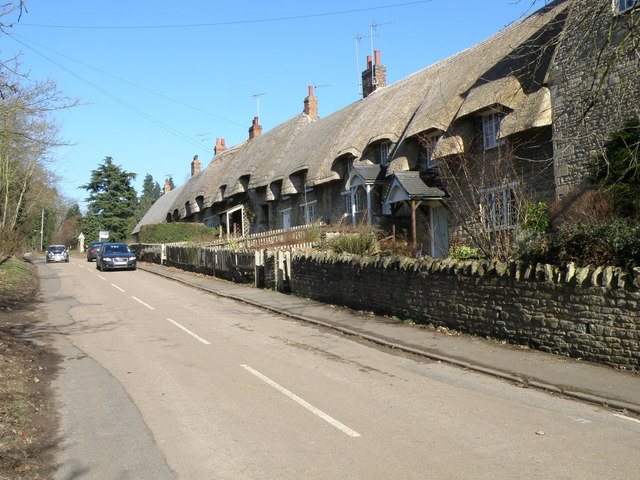

- Location within Northamptonshire
- OS grid reference: SP921773
- Civil parish: Cranford
- Unitary authority: North Northamptonshire
- Ceremonial county: Northamptonshire
- Region: East Midlands
- Country: England
- Sovereign state: United Kingdom
- Post town: Kettering
- Postcode district: NN14
- Dialling code: 01536
- Police: Northamptonshire
- Fire: Northamptonshire
- Ambulance: East Midlands
- UK Parliament: Kettering

Cranford St Andrew is a village and former civil parish, now in the parish of Cranford, in the North Northamptonshire district, in the ceremonial county of Northamptonshire, England. It neighbours Cranford St John. In 1931 the parish had a population of 142.

== History ==
The name of the two villages of Cranford derives from two Old English words meaning ford frequented by cranes or herons. The villages of Cranford St Andrew and Cranford St John are not named separately in the Domeday Survey of 1086 but the two names are mentioned separately in 1254. "St Andrew" and "St John" refer to the dedications of the parish churches.

The earliest part of the Church of St Andrew dates from about 1200. There is also later 12th century and maybe 13th work.

The hall was built in the early Georgian period and there have been later alterations. It was converted into flats in 1950.

Iron ore was obtained in the Cranford St Andrew district for many years to the east and west of the village. On the east side quarrying began to the east of Cranford Hall in 1873 continuing to 1882 or a little later. There are quarries still visible on the west side of the road. There was also a quarry on the east side of the road which was extended later. The ore was taken to a siding close to Cranford Railway Station (now closed) by horse and three-wheeled cart. From there it was taken away by train to be smelted. Quarrying began again to the east of the road in 1908 until 1919 and again from 1934 to 1955. Quarrying began to the west of the road, further north than before between 1940 and 1958.

From 1908 until 1919 the ore was taken to the siding by steam operated metre gauge tramway. The later quarries used a steam operated standard gauge tramway. From 1946 to 56 there was also a gannister quarry near to the northernmost iron ore quarry. The gannister was taken to the main tramway by steam operated narrow gauge tramway. In the earlier periods quarrying was by hand with the aid of explosives. From 1918 a steam quarrying machine was introduced. From 1934 steam and diesel machines were used and electric machines were added to these from 1940. These quarries have not been landscaped and the quarry faces are still visible.

On the west side of the village quarrying occurred between 1880 and 1889. The ore was taken to a railway siding west of the station by a tramway. It is not clear if horses or steam locomotives were used. In 1919 an adit was driven into the old quarry face and iron ore was mined using the pillar and stall method from then until 1926. In the latter stages the pillars holding the roof up were made narrower and after the mine was abandoned some of the tunnel roofs collapsed, causing sink holes or depressions in the ground. In some places they collapsed completely leaving gulleys with precipitous sides. Some of the holes and gulleys were later filled in. The mine was served by a cable operated tramway but ponies were used inside the mine and a larger horse at the tipping dock at the railway.

There were also iron ore quarries and mines at Cranford St John.

On 1 April 1935 the parish was abolished to form "Cranford".

== See also ==
- St Andrew's Church, Cranford
