= Harrington, Northamptonshire =

Village in Northamptonshire, England

Coordinates: 52.412°N 0.864°W

Harrington
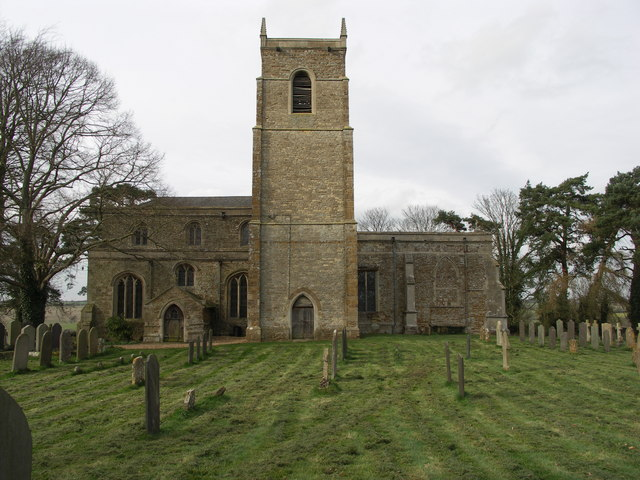
- St Peter & St Paul's Church, Harrington

- Location within Northamptonshire
- Population: 146 (2011)
- OS grid reference: SP7780
- Unitary authority: North Northamptonshire
- Ceremonial county: Northamptonshire
- Region: East Midlands
- Country: England
- Sovereign state: United Kingdom
- Post town: Northampton
- Postcode district: NN6
- Dialling code: 01536
- Police: Northamptonshire
- Fire: Northamptonshire
- Ambulance: East Midlands
- UK Parliament: Kettering

Harrington is a village and civil parish in Northamptonshire, England, administered by North Northamptonshire council. At the time of the 2001 census, the parish's population was 154 people, including Thorpe Underwood but reducing to 146 at the 2011 Census. The Church of England parish church of St Peter and St Paul is located north-east of the village itself.

== History ==
The villages name origin is uncertain. 'Farm/settlement connected with Heathuhere' or farm/settlement of the Heather dwellers'.

After the dissolution of the monasteries, the Saunders family became lords of the manor of Harrington. In the 17th century the manor house passed by marriage to the Stanhope and then the Tollemache families until it was pulled down in 1745 by Lionel Tollemache, 4th Earl of Dysart. A stone pillar from one of the gateposts now stands in the middle of Desborough.

The site of the manor house is called 'The Falls' with the 'Park' adjoining. The Falls contains the remains of terraces, fishponds and a sunken garden, which may have had a fountain. The fishponds were constructed to supply fresh fish to the monastic house. Eel, bream, pike, and perch were bred in a series of ponds of varying size fed by channels. The gardens were laid out by Sir Lionel Tollemache, 2nd Baronet who married Hon. Elizabeth Stanhope, daughter of John Stanhope, 1st Baron Stanhope, around 1620 and inherited the estate in 1675. It is now listed as an historical archaeological site.

The Tollemache family sold the Harrington estate in 1864, and it was ultimately purchased in 1913 by the Desborough Cooperative Society, which saw great possibilities in the development of ironstone working.

A converted barn at Falls Farm in Harrington now houses a gin distillery, Warner's Distillery. The gin is made with spring water from the farm itself, together with home-grown elderflower and ten other botanicals including juniper, coriander and Angelica root. In April 2013 the company was featured on BBC One's Countryfile.

== Notable buildings ==
The Historic England website contains details of a total of five listed buildings in the parish of Arthingworth, all of which are Grade II apart from St Peter & St Pauls Church, which is Grade II*. They are:

- St Peter & St Paul's Church, Church Lane
- Appleton Farmhouse, Rothwell Road
- Henry Hall's House, 22 & 24 High Street
- Slade Farmhouse, High Street
- 40-50 High Street

== RAF Harrington ==
During World War II RAF Harrington used by the USAF was located south of the village across the B576 road, now the A14. It was later a Thor missile site.
