= William Maunsell (Archdeacon of Limerick) =

Anglican priest

William Wray Maunsell (1782–1860) was an Anglican priest in Ireland in the 19th century.

He was born in Limerick and educated at Trinity College Dublin. He was Rector of Drishane from 1803 to 1814; and Archdeacon of Limerick from 1814 until his death.

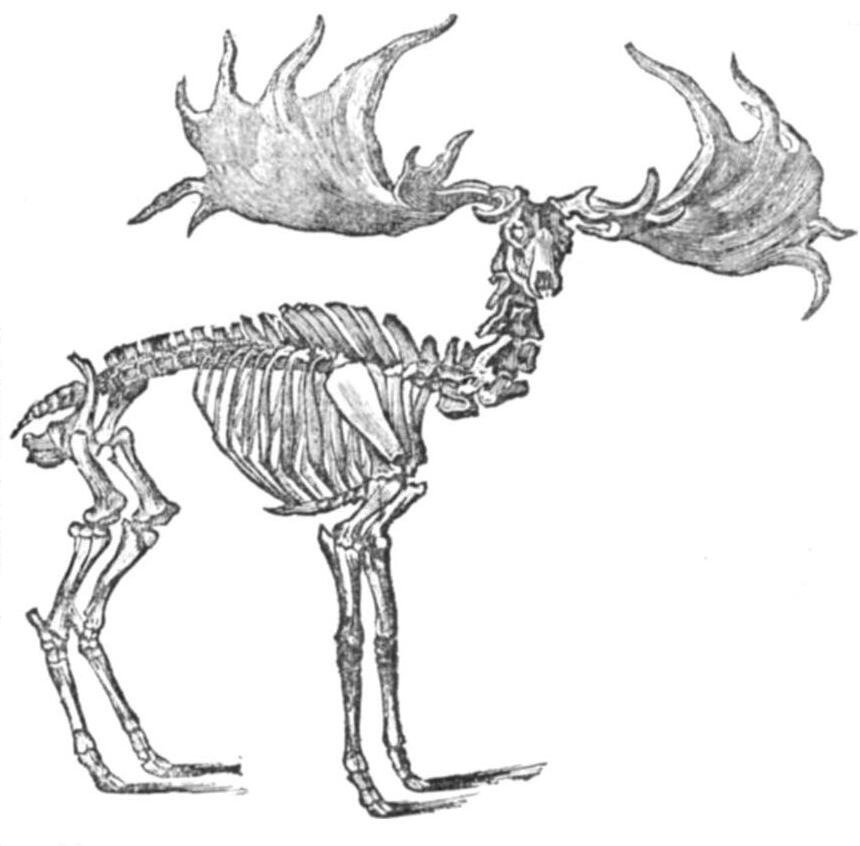
An illustration of the Irish Elk skeleton unearthed by Maunsell from a Rathcannon peat bog in 1824
