= Church of St Leonard, Thorpe Malsor =

Church in Northamptonshire, England

Coordinates: 52°24′10″N 0°46′34″W

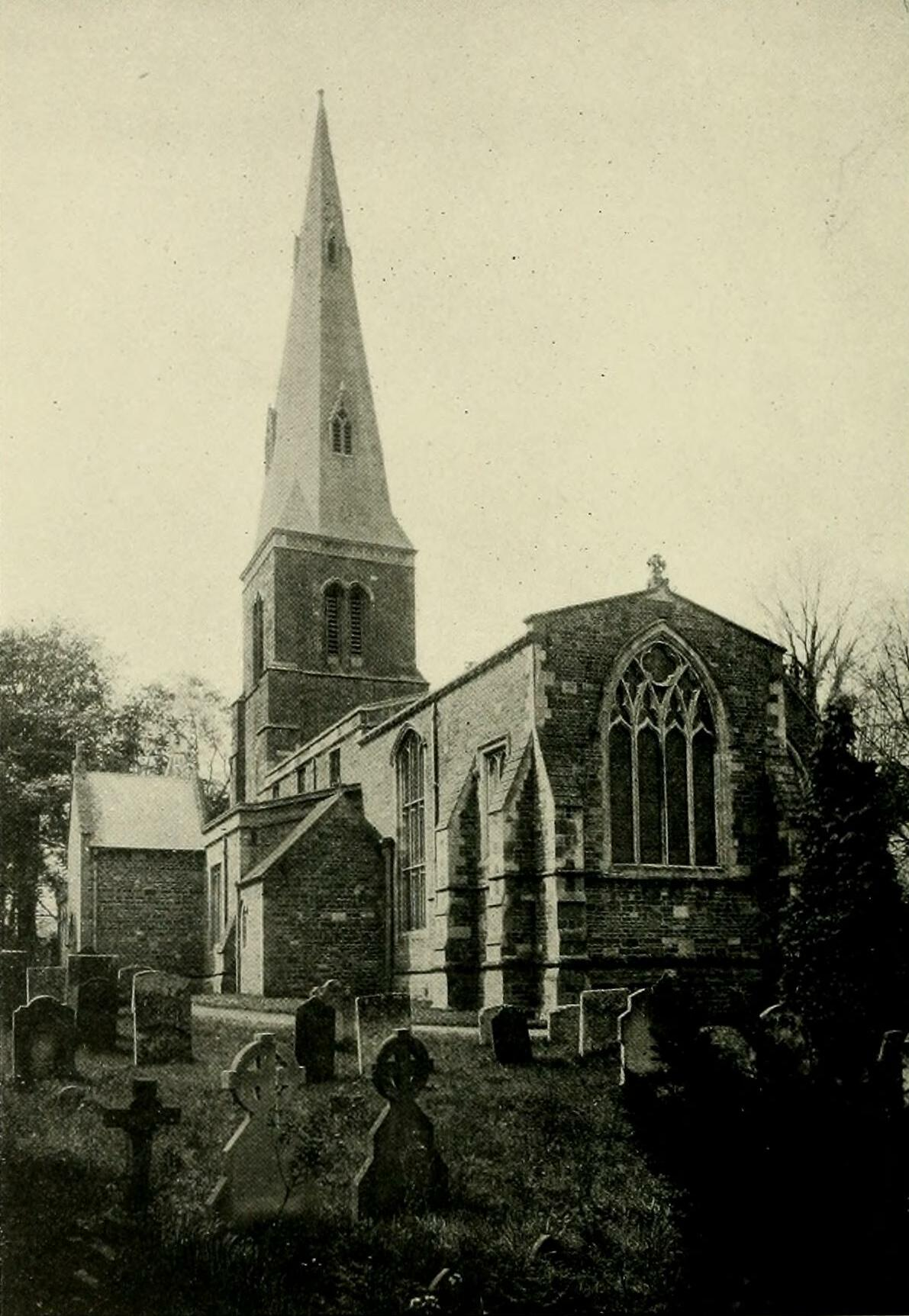
Exterior view, c. 1903

The Church of St Leonard (also called the Church of All Saints) is a Grade II* listed English parish church in Thorpe Malsor, Northamptonshire. Renovations carried out in 1877 by Clapton Rolfe of Reading somewhat altered the character of its mediaeval (13th–15th century) structures. Many of the Maunsells of Thorpe Malsor Hall are buried and memorialised there.

== Gallery ==
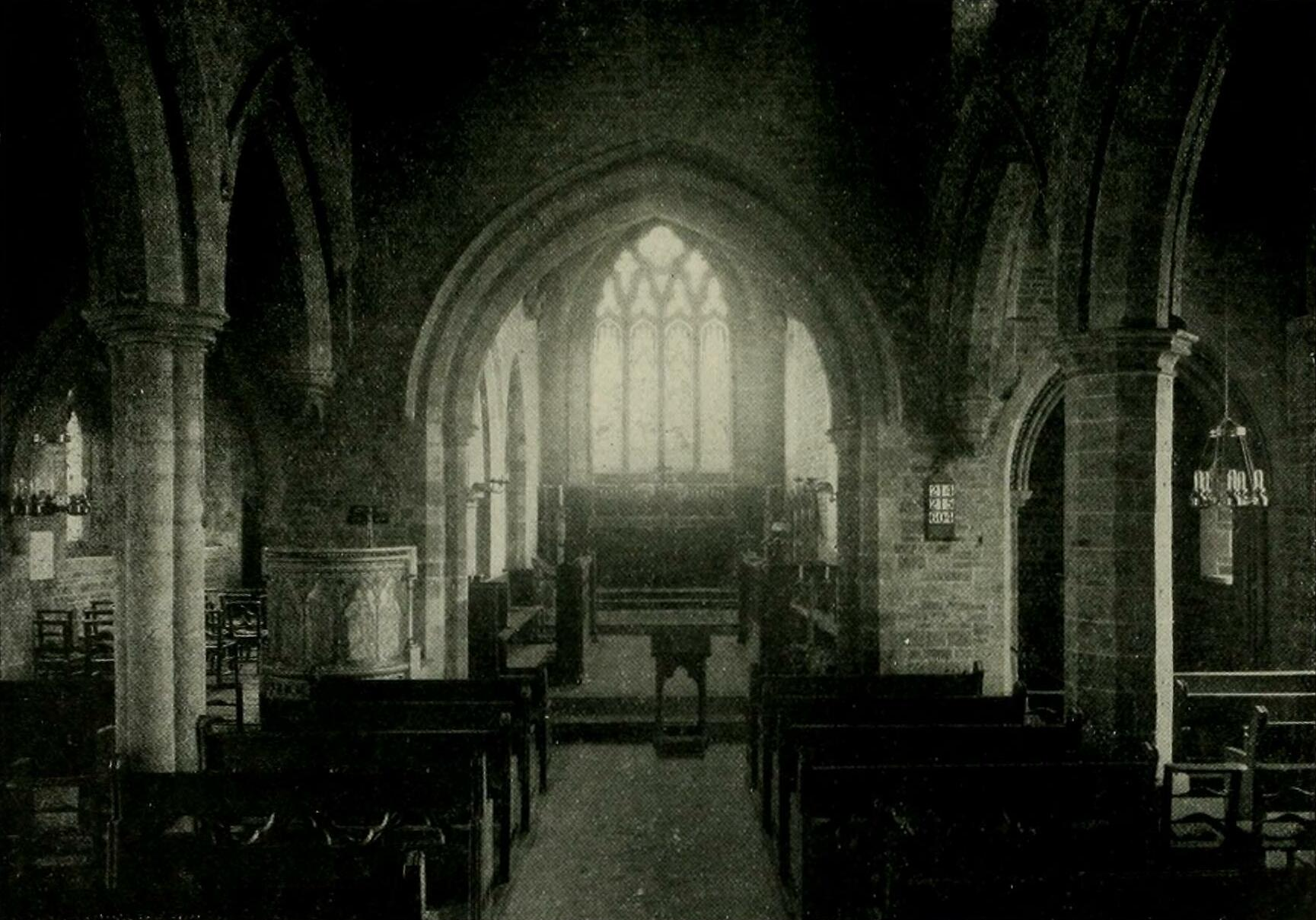
Interior view, c. 1903

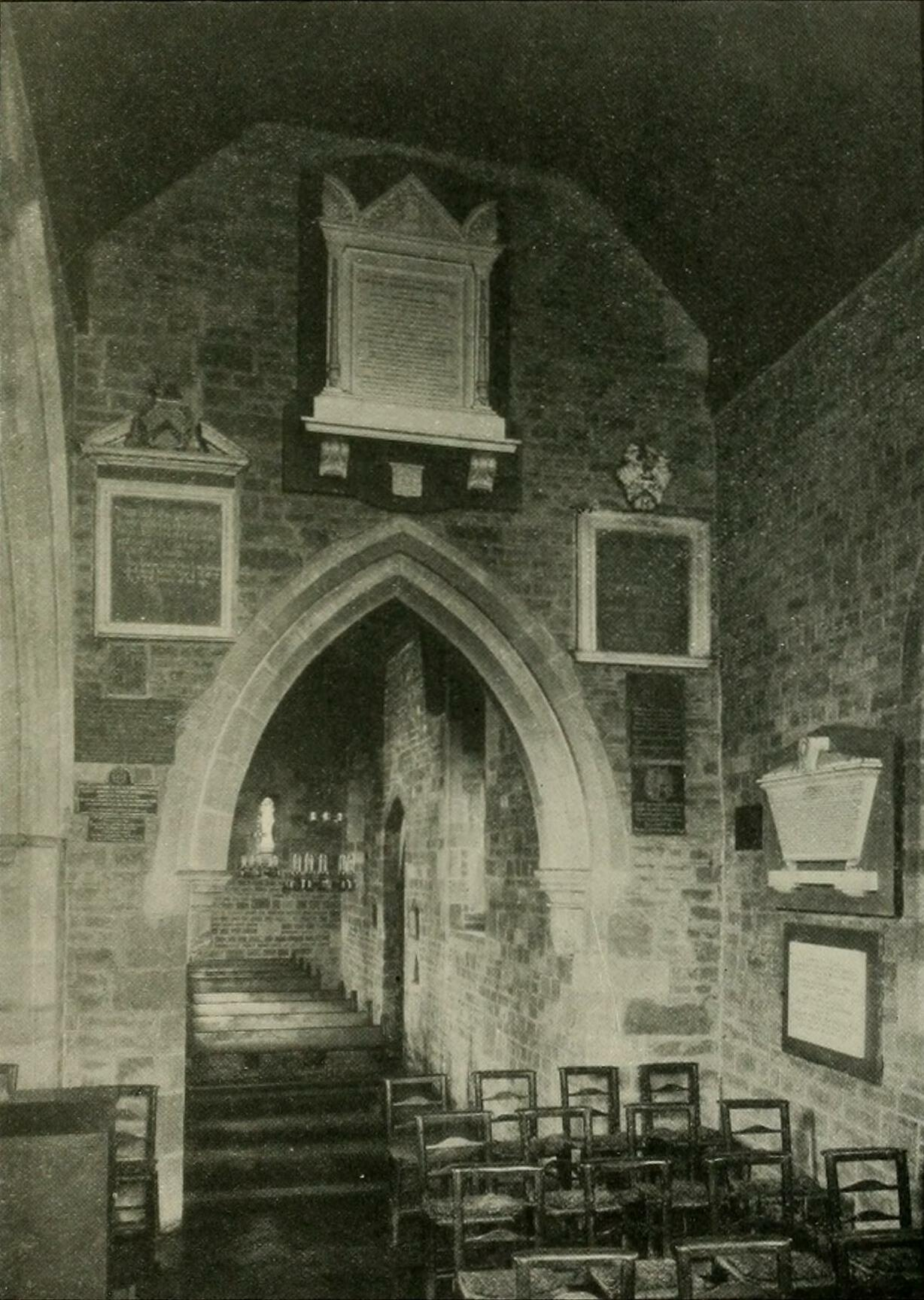
Side chapel, showing family monuments, c. 1903

== Sources ==
- Brandwood, Geoffrey K. (1987). "Thorpe Malsor St Leonard". Ancient and Modern Churches and Chapels Around Market Harborough. Leicester: Leicestershire Museums, Art Galleries and Records Service. p. 73.
- Maunsell, Robert George (1903). History of Maunsell, or Mansel, and of Crayford, Gabbett, Knoyle, Persse, Toler, Waller, Castletown; Waller, Prior Park; Warren, White, Winthrop, and Mansell of Guernsey. Cork: Guy and Company Limited. pp. 77–86.
