= Thorpe Malsor =

Village in Northamptonshire, England

Coordinates: 52.377°N 0.828°W

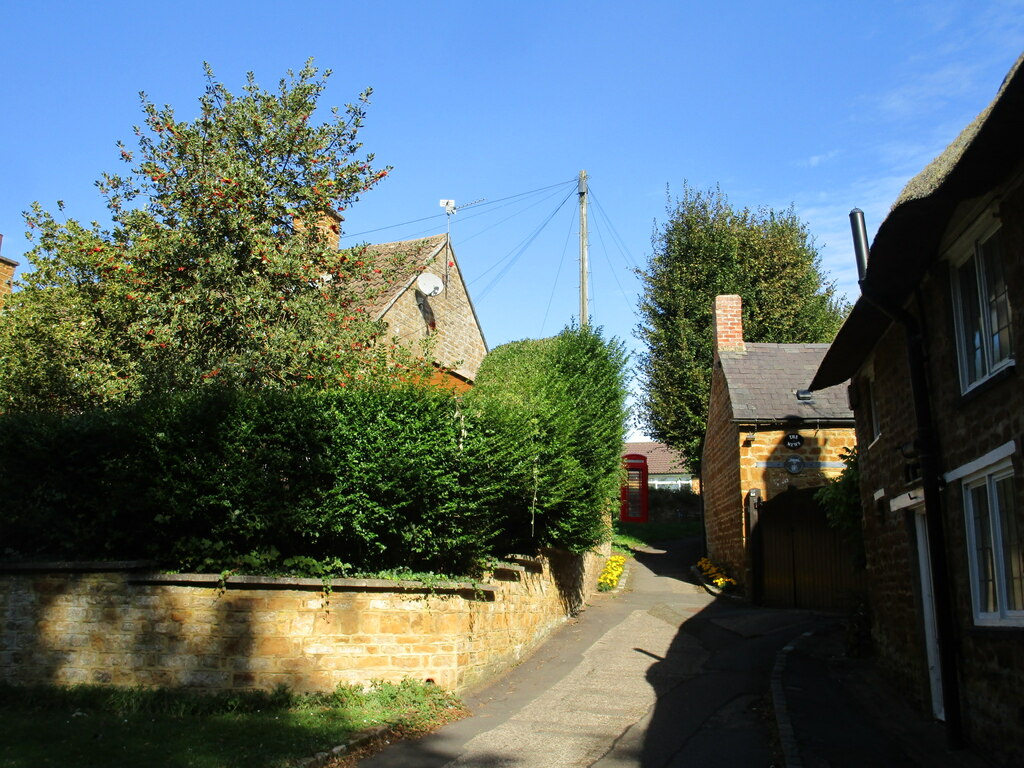
- Footpath to The Square, Thorpe Malsor

- Location within Northamptonshire
- Population: 144 (2001 census); 145 (2011 census)
- OS grid reference: SP8379
- Civil parish: Thorpe Malsor
- Unitary authority: North Northamptonshire
- Ceremonial county: Northamptonshire
- Region: East Midlands
- Country: England
- Sovereign state: United Kingdom
- Post town: Kettering
- Postcode district: NN14
- Police: Northamptonshire
- Fire: Northamptonshire
- Ambulance: East Midlands
- UK Parliament: Kettering

Thorpe Malsor is a village and civil parish 2 miles (3 km) west of Kettering, Northamptonshire, England. The population at the 2011 Census was 145.

== History ==
The village's name means 'outlying farm/settlement'. The village was held by Fucher Malesoures (Malesouveres) in the twelfth century. In the Domesday Book it was called 'Alida's outlying farm/settlement', potentially a shortening of the Old English female individual name, 'Aethelgyth'.

The Church of England parish church of All Saints was built late in the 13th and early in the 14th centuries. In 1877 the Gothic Revival architect C.C. Rolfe restored the church, with Harry Hems of Exeter undertaking the carving. All Saints parish is now part of a single benefice with the parishes of Broughton, Cransley and Loddington.

The village well in the middle of the main street was sunk in 1589. Thorpe Malsor Hall is a Jacobean house that was refenestrated in the 18th century and enlarged in 1817.

== Ironstone quarrying ==
Thorpe Malsor sits in the Northamptonshire ironstone field. Between 1903 and 1949, iron ore was quarried from extensive, shallow pits on the north and west sides of the village. These pits were connected to the ironworks north of Kettering, by branch of the narrow gauge Kettering Ironstone Railway. The first pit was close to the village on the west side. The last was further west. The railway crossed the valley north-east of the village on a substantial viaduct. The branch was removed in 1949. The railway was worked by steam locomotives including an unusual double ended locomotive built by the Sentinel Company which had a central cab and a boiler and chimney at each end. This was mostly used on the Thorpe Malsor branch. Steam quarrying machines were introduced from 1918 and diesel ones from 1944.

== See also ==
- Church of St Leonard, Thorpe Malsor
