= Finedon =

Town in Northamptonshire, England

Coordinates: 52.340°N 0.649°W

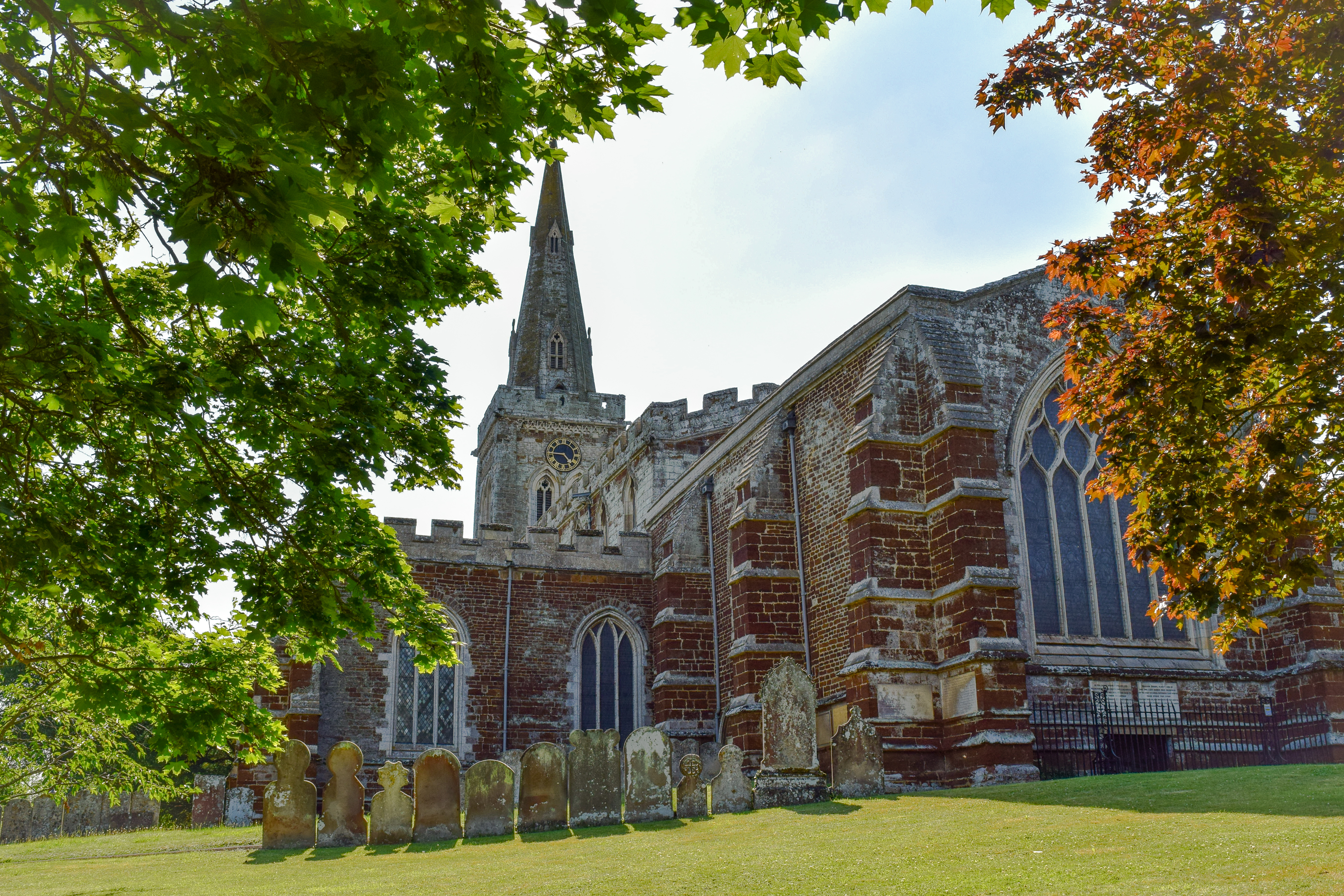
- St Mary the Virgin Church, Finedon

- Location within Northamptonshire
- Area: 14.82 km^{2} (5.72 sq mi)
- Population: 4,552 (2021 Census)
  - Density: 307/km^{2} (800/sq mi)
- OS grid reference: SP9171
- Civil parish: Finedon
- Unitary authority: North Northamptonshire
- Ceremonial county: Northamptonshire
- Region: East Midlands
- Country: England
- Sovereign state: United Kingdom
- Post town: WELLINGBOROUGH
- Postcode district: NN9
- Dialling code: 01933
- Police: Northamptonshire
- Fire: Northamptonshire
- Ambulance: East Midlands
- UK Parliament: Wellingborough

Finedon is a town and civil parish in North Northamptonshire, England, with a population at the 2021 census of 4,552. In 1086 when the Domesday Book was completed, Finedon (then known as Tingdene) was a large royal manor, previously held by Queen Edith, wife of Edward the Confessor.

From the 1860s the parish was much excavated for its iron ore, which lay underneath a layer of limestone and was quarried over the course of 100 years or more. Local furnaces produced pig iron and later the quarries supplied ore for the steel works at Corby. A disused quarry face in the south of the parish is a geological SSSI. Finedon is situated 4 miles (6.4 km) to the north east of Wellingborough. Nearby towns and villages include Irthlingborough, Burton Latimer and Great Harrowden.

== History ==
=== Domesday Book ===
In 1086 when the Domesday Book was completed, Finedon was a large royal manor, previously held by Queen Edith. At this time the village (now a town) was known as Tingdene, which originates from the Old English words þing meaning assembly or meeting and Denu meaning valley or vale. Tingdene and the later version, Thingdon, were used until the early nineteenth century until finally Finedon became the commonly accepted version, both in written format as well as in pronunciation.

At the time of the Domesday Book Finedon was one of only four towns listed with a population greater than 50 in Northamptonshire - the others being Northampton, Brackley and Rushton.

The Bell Inn also claims to be listed in the Domesday Book, but the current building does not date back to this period, and there is evidence that the original inn was situated several hundred metres away. However, the main building was built around 1598, with the current façade added in 1872.

=== St Mary's Church ===
The Parish Church of St Mary the Virgin, is a mid-14th-century church with an aisled nave of four bays. The parish priest until 2022 was the Reverend Richard Coles, a broadcaster and former member of pop group The Communards.

The tower houses a ring of eight bells in the key of D, with the tenor weighing just over 21 hundredweight (about 1.1 tonnes). The church also houses an organ which was probably originally built for St George's Chapel in Windsor Castle in 1704. It was installed in 1717, rebuilt in 1872, and restored in 1960 and again in 2014, and it retains its tracker action.

=== Finedon Hall ===
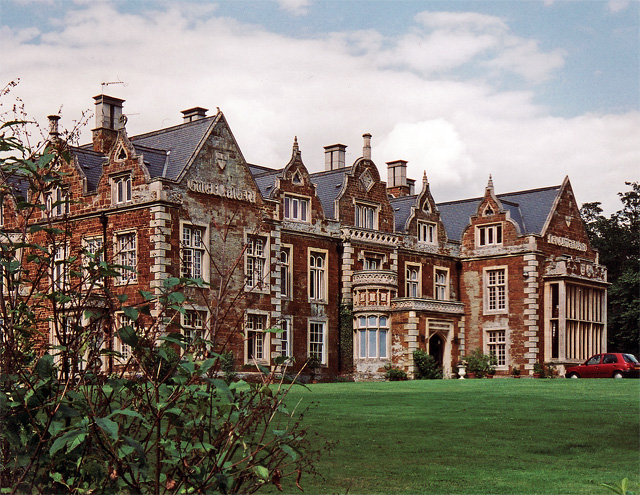
Finedon Hall

Finedon Hall is a Grade II listed 17th- or 18th-century country house with later modifications. It is built in the Tudor style to an H-shaped floor plan in two storeys with attics. It is constructed in ironstone ashlar with limestone dressings and a slate roof.

The house has now been converted into apartments.

=== Finedon Obelisk ===
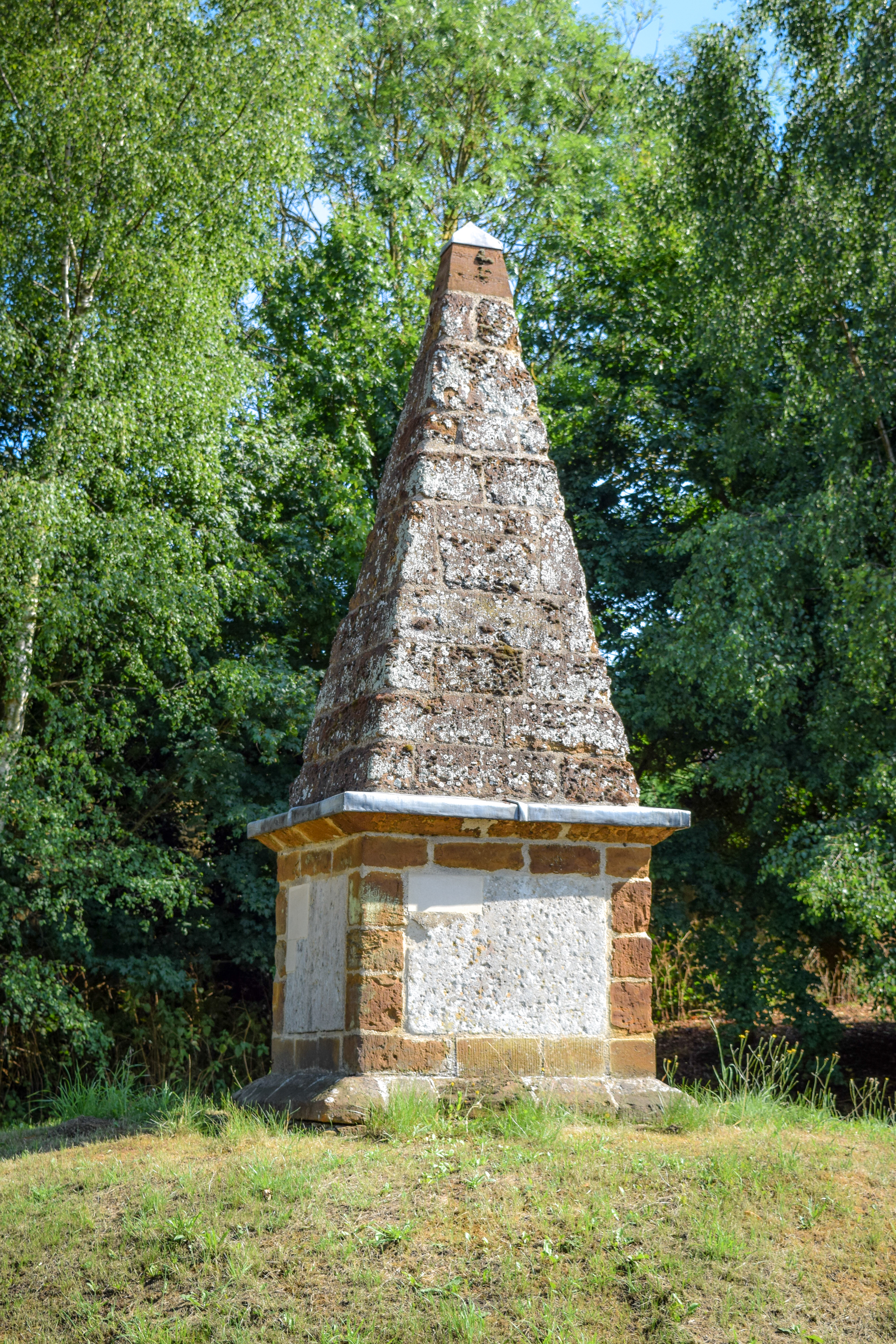
Finedon Obelisk

The Finedon Obelisk is a monument erected in 1789 to record the blessings of the year by Sir John English Dolben, the fourth and last of the Dolben baronets and lord of the manor of Finedon. The blessings are thought to include the return to sanity of George III. The 23 April 1789 was appointed a day of thanksgiving to commemorate the event, which in Finedon was celebrated with bell ringing, fireworks and the firing of cannon.

The obelisk is located in a small enclosure next to the A6 and A510 roundabout.

=== Volta Tower ===
Finedon was formerly home to the Volta Tower, a folly built in 1865 by William Harcourt Isham Mackworth-Dolben of Finedon Hall. It was built to commemorate the death of his eldest son, Lieutenant Commander William Digby Dolben, who drowned off the west coast of Africa on 1 September 1863, aged 24. The building stood for 86 years before collapsing in 1951, killing one of its residents.

=== Water Tower ===
The Water Tower was completed in 1904, originally costing £1500 to build, with the whole scheme of public water provision for Finedon costing £13,000. The tower is octagonal in shape and is divided into five interior stages. The exterior of the building is a red, yellow and blue polychrome brick design with a lead and plain-tile roof.

The Water Tower has since been converted into a private residence and in 1973, gained Grade II listed status. It stands as a local landmark beside the A6 on the southern entrance into Finedon.

== Governance ==
At the introduction of modern Local Government by the Local Government Act 1894, Finedon was designated an Urban District, with an Urban District Council. In 1935 the Finedon Urban District was abolished, and Finedon became part of the Wellingborough Urban District. In 1983, Finedon Parish Council was established, to provide better local representation and influence in decision-making. it currently has thirteen members. In 2018, the parish adopted the name Finedon Town Council.

From 1974 to 2021, Finedon was within the Borough of Wellingborough. Following the county-wide restructuring of local government on 1 April 2021, the town is now under the jurisdiction of the unitary authority of North Northamptonshire. The town is represented in the House of Commons as part of the Wellingborough Parliamentary constituency.

== Geography ==
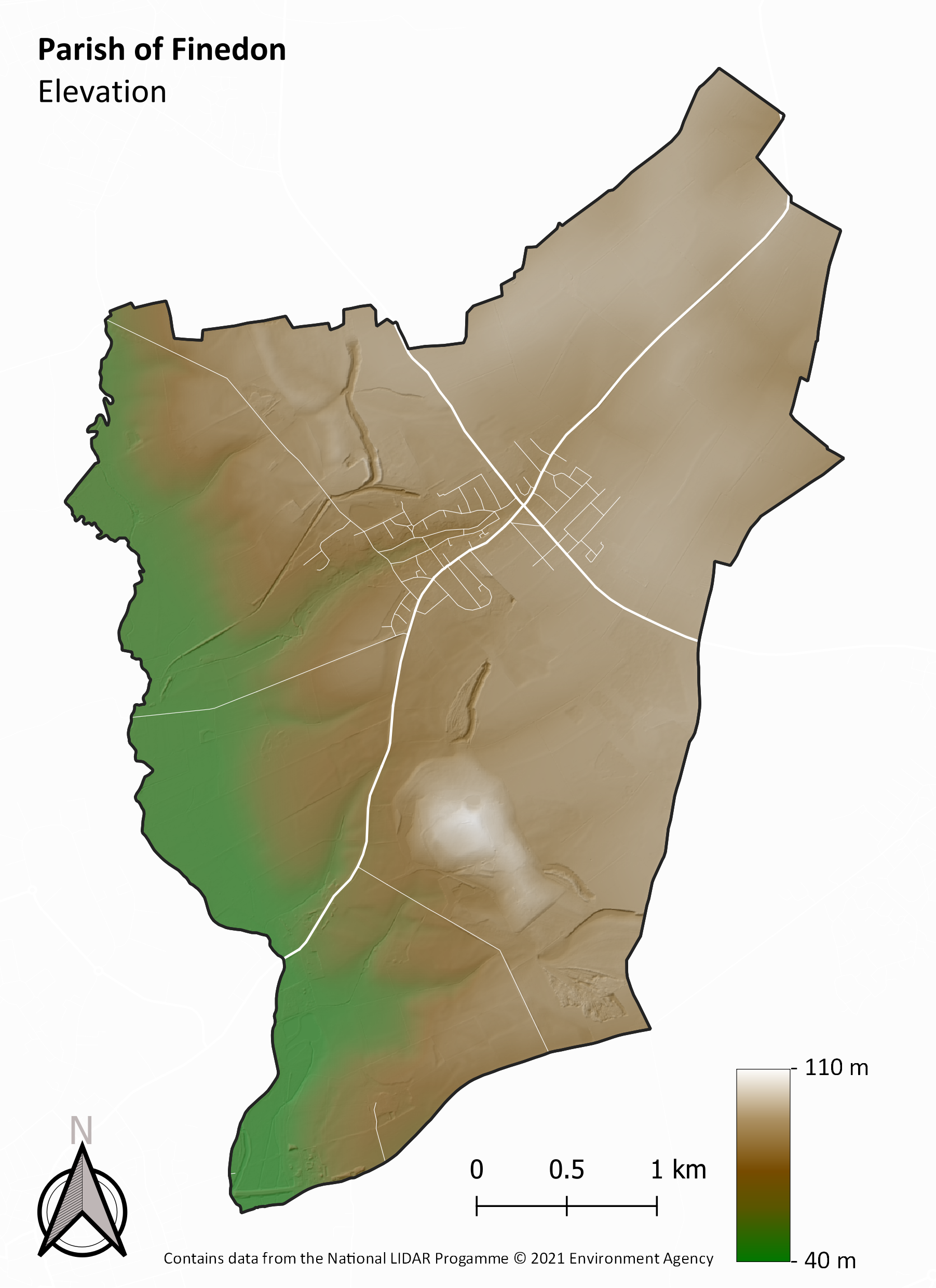
An elevation map of the Parish of Finedon.

The town of Finedon rises to approximately 90 metres Above Ordinance Datum from the River Ise, with the historical centre of the settlement occupying a shallow south-west facing valley. The contemporary point of maximum elevation in the parish is the summit of the disused Sidegate Lane Landfill Site, located south of the town at approximately 108 metres Above Ordinance Datum. The parish covers a total area of 1,482 hectares (3,662 acres).

=== Town Brook ===
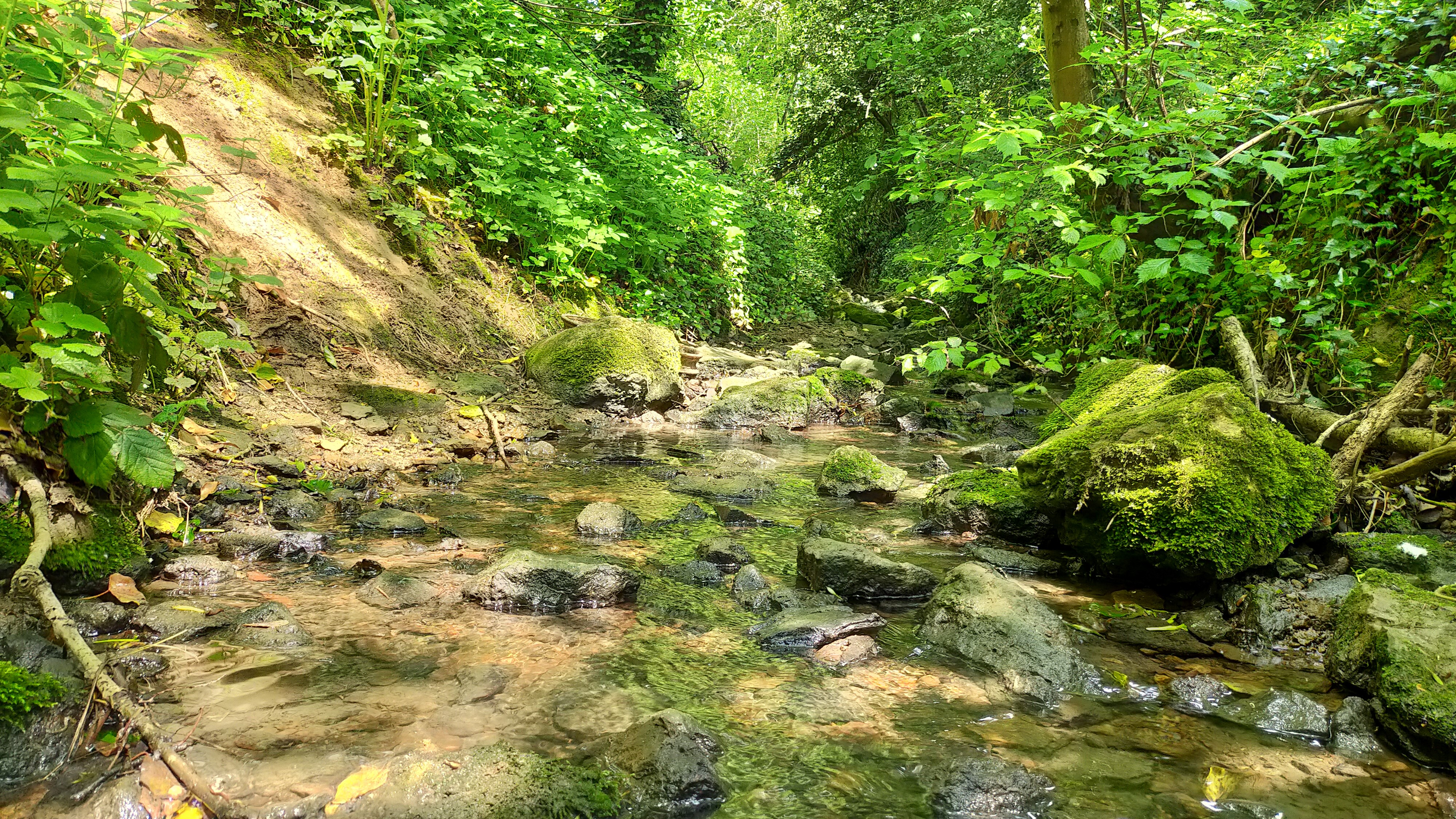
The Town Brook flowing through woodland south-west of Finedon

Finedon's origins are likely related to the availability of water from the "Town Brook" which historically flowed through the central axis of the settlement. It is now entirely culverted from its spring fed source north-east of Finedon all the way through the town, eventually surfacing in the grounds of Finedon Hall. From here, it flows through The Grove and arable farmland to meet the River Ise near the Cally Banks.

The Town Brook was dammed in the 1780s by instruction from Sir William Dolben to create a lake in the parkland associated with Finedon Hall. The lake had an island, which was accessed via a small rowing boat for picnics. The lake was drained in 1880 after a typhoid outbreak in the town and the remains of the earth dam and spillway can still be found in The Grove.

Until the mid-19th century, Dolben Square alongside Affleck Bridge also contained a substantial pond fed by the Town Brook called "The Ware", the name derived from "wayour", a pond for washing horses.

=== Banks Park ===
Finedon's main park, complete with outdoor tennis courts and an open place popular among dog walkers and cyclists. There is also a play area for children consisting of swings, climbing frame, roundabout, assault course and more. Banks Park sits between Burton Road, High Street and Wellingborough Road, Finedon and can be accessed from both High Street and Wellingborough Road.

=== Pocket Park ===
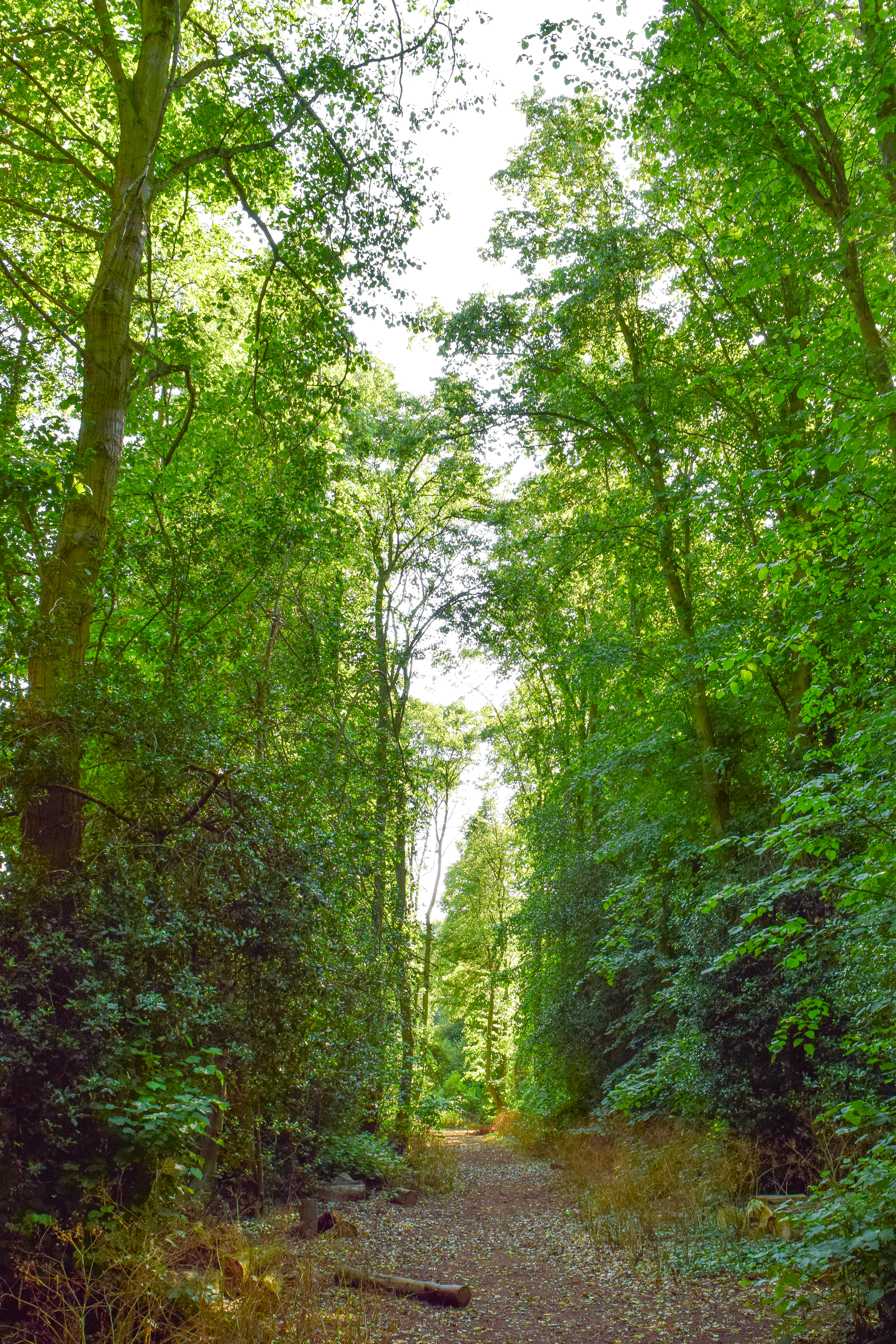
Old coppiced lime trees at Finedon Pocket Park

From 1939 until 1946 ironstone was extracted from the quarry at Finedon and transported via a railway line to the main line at Wellingborough.

Rather than filling in the railway cutting and quarry and returning it to agricultural land, the people of Finedon campaigned to retain it as an important wildlife area. In 1984, it was designated the first Pocket Park in the country. The heritage of the park as a quarry led to it earning its local name "The Pits".

The quarry area is predominantly grassland and scrub with ponds supporting a diverse range of amphibians. The majority of the railway cutting is woodland containing mainly ash, sycamore and oak. The park is owned by the Borough Council of Wellingborough and is managed by a team of volunteers from the Finedon branch of the Northamptonshire Wildlife Trust to maximise its benefit for the flora and fauna. Scrub in the quarry is cut back to maintain the grassland, whilst large trees and other patches of scrub are left to provide feeding and nesting sites for birds. The ponds are also managed to ensure they do not become completely overhung by trees.

Old coppiced lime trees estimated to be over three hundred years as well as yews of considerable age are to be found alongside the labyrinth of trails that cross the site.

Access to the park can be found via Station Road and Avenue Road, next to the Finedon Dolben Cricket Club.

To the south western side of Finedon Pocket Park is another nature reserve, Finedon Cally Banks, owned and managed by the Wildlife Trust for Bedfordshire, Cambridgeshire and Northamptonshire. The name Cally Banks comes from the process of burning iron ore to remove impurities, leaving a deposit called calcine which provides the poor soil conditions in which wildflowers flourish.

=== Climate ===
Finedon, much like the rest of the British Isles, experiences an oceanic climate and as such does not endure extreme temperatures and benefits from fairly evenly spread rainfall throughout the year.

Climate data for Finedon, GBR
Month	Jan	Feb	Mar	Apr	May	Jun	Jul	Aug	Sep	Oct	Nov	Dec	Year
Mean daily maximum °C (°F)	7 (45)	8 (46)	10 (50)	13 (55)	16 (61)	19 (66)	22 (72)	22 (72)	19 (66)	14 (57)	10 (50)	7 (45)	14 (57)
Mean daily minimum °C (°F)	2 (36)	2 (36)	3 (37)	4 (39)	7 (45)	10 (50)	12 (54)	12 (54)	10 (50)	7 (45)	4 (39)	2 (36)	6 (43)
Average precipitation cm (inches)	4.3 (1.7)	3.4 (1.3)	3.1 (1.2)	3.9 (1.5)	4.0 (1.6)	4.8 (1.9)	5.0 (2.0)	5.0 (2.0)	5.1 (2.0)	6.2 (2.4)	4.8 (1.9)	4.7 (1.9)	54.3 (21.4)

== Education ==
Finedon is served by two primary schools, the Finedon Infant School for children aged 4 to 7, and the Finedon Mulso Church of England Junior school for ages 7 to 11. The two schools became federated in 2011 and are now operated as one school with one headteacher. Supervisory childcare is available both before and after conventional school hours by the Apple Tree Club, located next to the Infant School.

There is no secondary school in Finedon, so pupils are required to travel outside of the town to continue their education after leaving the Junior school. Huxlow Academy in Irthlingborough accommodates the large majority of these pupils, with the provision of a free bus pass with services from the Gladstone bus stop on Wellingborough road and the Dolben Arms PH bus stop outside the Premier on Irthlingborough Road (A6). These services are operated by Stagecoach Midlands. It is not uncommon however for some to attend Latimer Arts College in Barton Seagrave or Bishop Stopford School in Kettering.

Pre-school and early years' education for ages 2 and up is catered for by St Michael's playgroup, rated "Good" by Ofsted in July 2014.

== Finedon Ironstone ==
The dark brown ironstone that underlies the parish is one of Northamptonshire's more durable building stones, unlike much of the ironstone elsewhere in the county which can become crumbly or delaminate. The 14th-century church is built mainly from this stone, which is presumed to have been quarried locally (with paler coloured limestone of Weldon Stone around the windows and door.) Other older buildings in the town also use the local ironstone, notably the vicarage and a house opposite the church built in 1712 as a charity school for girls. The various works of the Dolben family also make use of the ironstone. Chemical changes within the stone, while it was still in the ground, have resulted in a hard crystalline mineral version of Limonite which bonds the particles together, creating a harder, more durable ironstone, but which was still workable when lifted from the ground. An Enclosure map of 1805 records two stone pits in the town.

=== Quarries ===
In the early part of Britain's Industrial Revolution, the Northamptonshire ironstone was ignored as a source of iron ore because unlike areas such as South Wales and the north of England, it had no coal to power the furnaces. In the mid 19th century the railways arrived, which meant that either the ore could be taken to distant furnaces, or coal brought to furnaces near the iron deposits. Both happened at Finedon from the 1860s.

==== Glendon Iron Ore Company ====
Quarries in the Finedon and Burton Latimer area, began with the workings of the Glendon Iron Ore Company, who in 1866 built the Finedon Furnaces, near Finedon station, along the eastern side the Midland Railway that had opened in 1857. Furnace Lane still runs through the industrial estate where the furnace once stood. The open-top furnace produced pig iron from 1866 to 1891, and numerous quarry pits to the north, east and south of the town were engaged in the laborious task of clearing back overlying rocks (sometimes up to 25 feet thick) using wheelbarrows and planks. The underlying ironstone was then loaded into wagons which used a series of tramways to get the ore to the furnace, or later processed at a Calciting plant and then transported by rail to furnaces in the coal fields of Derbyshire or beyond.

==== Stanton Ironworks ====
Areas south and east of the town were quarried by the Stanton Ironworks Company, who began using Northamptonshire ironstone in 1865. By 1869 they were leasing quarries on the Finedon Hall estate and built a narrow-gauge tramway to connect to the Midland Railway, and from there the ore was transported by rail to their furnaces at Stanton by Dale, Derbyshire.

==== Neilson's Quarries ====
Walter Neilson was quarrying in areas close to the town, either side of Ryegate Hill from before 1879. In 1881 he laid Neilson's Tramway a 2 ft 4 in (711 mm) gauge tramway down to sidings on the Midland Railway. These siding were called "Neilson's Sidings" until at least the 1990s. Neilson's original pits were exhausted by 1892 and he leased new land on the east side of Finedon Road, immediately south of the town. This new pit was known as Thingdon Quarry. In 1911 Neilson's operation was taken over by Wellingborough Iron Company (see below).

==== Wellingborough Iron Company ====
To the south and east of the town, several companies operated quarries. Amongst these were the Rixon Iron and Brick company, which began quarrying near Finedon in 1874. Rixon laid the 1,000 mm (3 ft 3 3/8 in) gauge Wellingborough Tramway to connect their ironstone pits to sidings of the Midland Railway. Rixon built their own ironworks alongside the Midland Railway in 1884. In 1887, Rixon's company declared bankruptcy and was taken over by the newly formed Wellingborough Iron Company. They relaid the tramway and opened up several more ironstone pits south of Finedon. In 1911, Stanton took over Neilson's Thingdon Quarry immediately south of the town and started a series underground mines there in 1913. In 1932, the whole operation was merged with the Stanton Ironworks company.

Stanton Ironworks Company was acquired by Stewarts & Lloyds in 1939, which was one of the companies that were merged and nationalised to become British Steel in 1967.

==== Ironstone production ====
Quarried ironstone from the area had initially produced pig iron for use in cast-iron production. After 1879, with the development of the Gilchrist–Thomas process the production of steel was made possible using iron ore with a high Phosphate content, such as the Northamptonshire Ironstone. Around Finedon the quarries south of the town near Ryebury Hill and Sidegate Lane had been worked extensively between the 1870s and 1900s, using a labour-intensive method in which a long trench (or gullet) through the overburden was established, along which a tramway could transport the ore. The overburden (often of considerable depth) was loaded into wheelbarrows and taken via planks suspended over the trench, to be dumped on the far side, so that the next section of ore could be dug out. In this way the trench would gradually migrate across a field, and the reinstated land would be several feet lower than the surrounding fields. In the 20th century the introduction of ever larger dragline excavators allowed faster working with far fewer people employed. The smaller steel plants had all been merged in 1967 and most were shut down in favour of the Corby Works. This too ceased steel production in 1980, and all Finedon quarrying had ceased by that point.

=== Geological SSSI ===
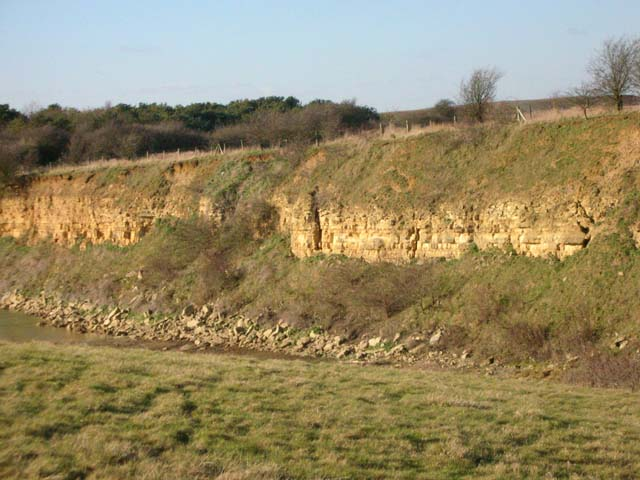
Finedon Top Lodge SSSI Quarry Face

Towards the southern end of the parish, one of the quarries that had been worked since at least the 1920s is Finedon Top Lodge Quarry. By the mid-1960 it was being worked by Stewarts & Lloyds Ltd (to whom it was known as Wellingborough No. 5 pit), who transported the ironstone to the steel works at Corby. In 1986 it was declared a Site of Special Scientific Interest on account of its geological significance. Although the quarry is no longer in use, the surviving rock-face has been given legal protection for its value in showing a representative section through the Middle Jurassic sedimentary beds. At its base, although no longer visible, is the ironstone which is part of the 'Northampton Sand Formation' of rocks. Everything above the ironstone would have been just 'overburden' to the quarrymen, which needed to be excavated and moved to the other side of the gullet, to allow the ironstone to be accessed. However they are now a piece of the evidence in building up an understanding of how the geology of Northamptonshire during the Jurassic period came into being. Almost all the layers of rock in the overburden were laid down during the Bathonian Stage of the Middle Jurassic. The layers accumulated over some 2 million years, beginning 168 million years ago, several million years after the ironstone had stopped being deposited. The cliff face reveals a 4 metres (13 ft) layer of limestone and other material known as the 'Wellingborough Member' for which this quarry face is the type section. Above that is a further 6 metres (20 ft) of harder limestone beds known as the 'Blisworth Limestone Formation'.

== Notable people ==
- Arthur Henfrey, football player for England between 1891 and 1896
- Sir Gilbert Dolben, 1st Baronet, Tory politician who sat in the House of Commons from 1685 to 1715
- Sir William Dolben, 3rd Baronet, MP and campaigner for the abolition of slavery
- Digby Mackworth Dolben, teenage poet brought up at Finedon Hall, who died young
- Richard Coles, Vicar of Finedon parish from 2011 to 2022 and former pop musician with The Communards
- Charles Addis, English first-class cricketer
- Robert Clarke, English cricketer active from 1947 to 1957
- Terry Freeman, English cricketer, cousin of Robert Clarke
- David Imms, artist and painter
- John Minney, English cricketer active from 1959 to 1967
- Herbert Paul, English writer and Liberal MP

== Town Twinning ==
Along with Wellingborough, Finedon is twinned with:

- Niort, France since 1977
- Wittlich, Germany since 1993

== See also ==
- Dutch Doll of Finedon
- Finedon railway station
