= River Ise and Meadows =

Protected area along the River Ise in Northamptonshire, England

Coordinates: 52.438°N 0.719°W

- Site of Special Scientific Interest
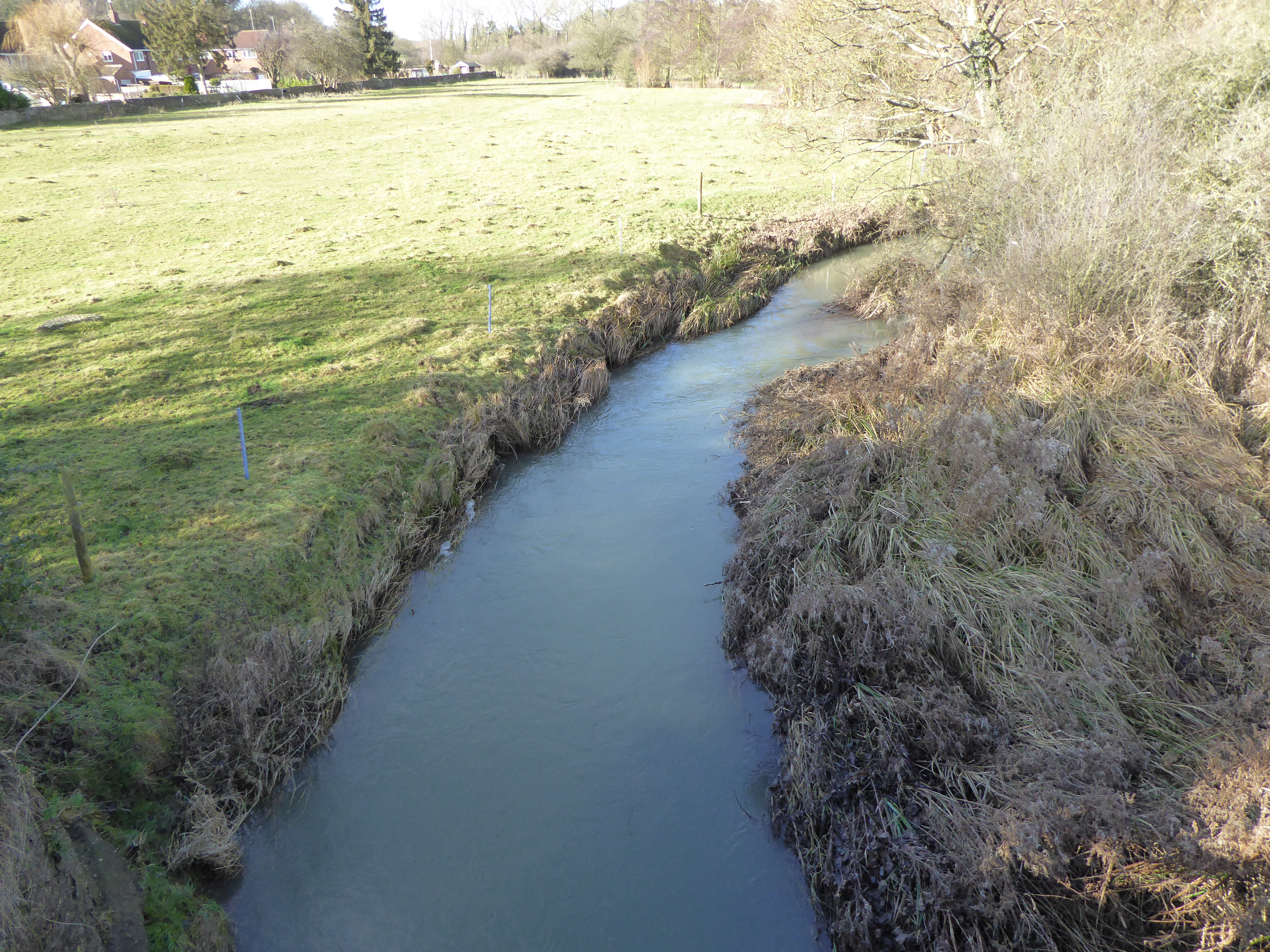
- The River Ise at Geddington
- Location of River Ise and Meadows.
- Area of search: Northamptonshire
- Grid reference: SP 871 830
- Interest: Biological
- Area: 13.5 hectares
- Notification date: 1988
- Location map: Magic Map

River Ise and Meadows is a 13.5-hectare (33-acre) biological Site of Special Scientific Interest along the River Ise in Northamptonshire between Geddington and the Kettering to Corby railway line east of Rushton.

The river is described by Natural England as "the best example in the county of a lowland river on clay, fed by base-rich water". The banks have tall fen, woodland and grassland, and there is also a species rich flood meadow. The river has many bends and loops, with silty pools and gravel shoals. The invertebrates are diverse, and there is a population of the nationally declining freshwater crayfish Austropotamobius pallipes.

The eastern section runs through private land, but the western end, between Barford Bridge and the railway line, is part of the Barford Wood and Meadows nature reserve, managed by the Wildlife Trust for Bedfordshire, Cambridgeshire and Northamptonshire.
