= Charles Addis =

English cricketer

Cricket information
- Batting: Left-handed
- Bowling: Left-arm medium

Career statistics
Competition	First-class
Matches	2
Runs scored	38
Batting average	38
100s/50s	0/0
Top score	38
Balls bowled	282
Wickets	5
Bowling average	31
5 wickets in innings	0
10 wickets in match	0
Best bowling	3/78
Catches/stumpings	1/–
- Source: CricketArchive, 9 September 2022

Charles Addis (2 February 1902 – 15 August 1983) was an English first-class cricketer. He was a left-handed batsman and a left-arm medium-pace bowler who played first-class cricket for Northamptonshire. He was born in Finedon and died in Northampton.

Addis made his debut during the 1924 season, playing against Dublin University, against whom he took three wickets with the ball. His contribution with the bat, an innings of 38 from eighth in the batting order, was to prove the only time he would take to the field with a bat in his hand. Northamptonshire beat their university opponents by an innings margin.

Addis's second and final first-class appearance came against the very same team almost exactly two years later, with the same result, thanks to century innings from team-mates William Adams and John Timms. Addis took one wicket in the first innings of the match, and in the second, bowled four overs, conceding just one run.
