= Wicksteed Park =

Amusement park in Kettering, Northamptonshire, England

Coordinates: 52.385°N 0.703°W

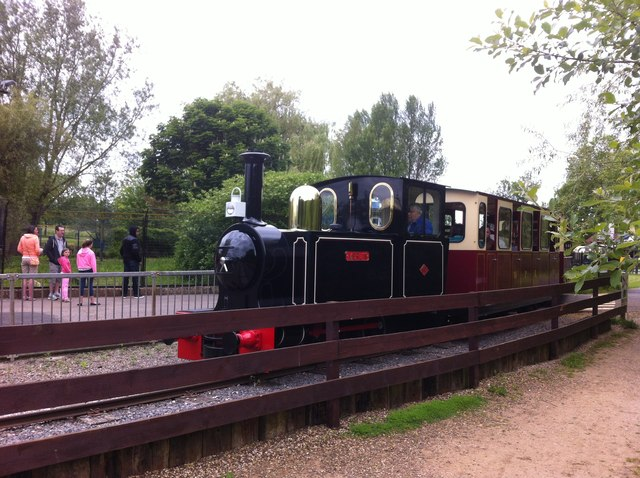
- Locomotive "Merlin" hauling a passenger train on the Wicksteed Park Railway
- Interactive map of Wicksteed Park
- Location: Kettering, Northamptonshire, England
- Opened: 1921
- Owner: Wicksteed Charitable Trust
- Slogan: The Place Where Fun Was Invented

Attractions
- Total: 27
- Roller coasters: 3
- Water rides: 4
- Website: https://wicksteedpark.org/

Wicksteed Park is a Grade II listed park described as a unique urban park with rides in Kettering, Northamptonshire, England. The park is located in the south-east of Kettering, on the western edge of Barton Seagrave village. The park is owned by the Wicksteed Charitable Trust, with the urban park being run by its trading subsidiary company Wicksteed Park Ltd (replaced by Wicksteed Trading Ltd after going into administration in 2020).

== Foundation ==
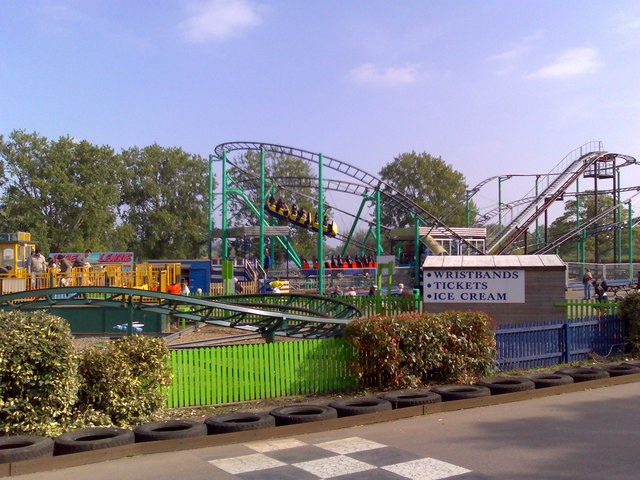
A ride at Wicksteed Park

The park was founded by Charles Wicksteed, a wealthy industrialist who owned the engineering works of Charles Wicksteed & Co. Ltd in Kettering. In 1913 he purchased the meadowland, which was part of the Barton Seagrave Hall estate, with the intention of building a model village for his workers, to be called the Barton Seagrave Garden Suburb Estate. The Wicksteed Village Trust was set up to run the enterprise. After World War I, when local authorities were building public housing, Wicksteed decided instead to create a park with leisure facilities for local people, with refreshments and attractions, for which a modest charge was made, funding the provision of a free playground and sporting facilities.

The first playground equipment, manufactured by Wicksteed's company, had been installed in 1917 and an artificial lake fed by the Ise Brook was constructed in 1921, with the park officially opened that year. By 1926 the park had a pavilion and theatre building, a rose garden, a water chute, bandstand, and fountain. The water chute was designed by Charles Wicksteed and a few years later was given a new roof. Barton Seagrave Hall was purchased by Charles Wicksteed in 1928. In 1931 a railway track was built around the edge of the lake. Charles Wicksteed died in 1931 and the Wicksteed Village Trust continued his work, adding features and facilities to the park.

== Development ==
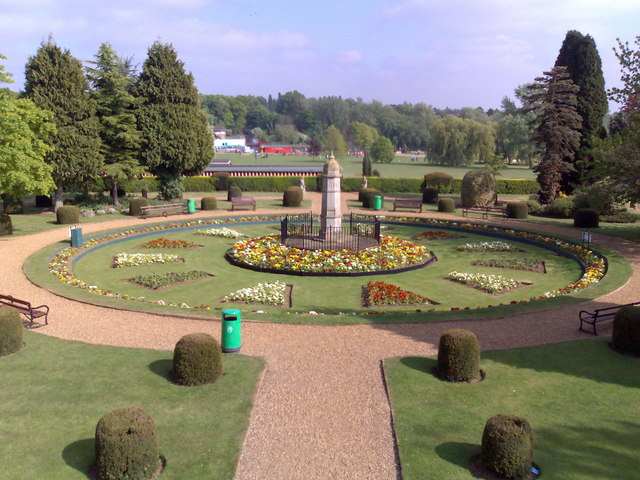
Gardens

The park continued to develop during the 1930s with the addition of a golf course, toy shop and aviary. A tunnel was added to the railway. The park attracted a record 40,000 visitors on August bank holiday Monday in 1935. During World War II the park remained partially open, with American troops billeted in the pavilion. Improvement continued in the 1950s, with the opening of a cinema, a miniature car track, a pets corner and an ice cream factory. In 1969 a new office and administration block was built. The 1970s saw the addition of a nature trail, a skateboarding rink and a ferris wheel. In April 1980 the park played host to the It's a Knockout television programme and also added the iconic double pirate ship. Attendance had fallen during the 1970s but had recovered to an annual 750,000 visitors by 1982. Two roller coasters, nautic jets, a cup and saucer ride and a pedal cycle monorail were added during the 1990s.

== Twenty-first century ==
A mascot for the park, Wicky Bear, was acquired in 2000. The park hosts the local weekly parkrun and an annual fireworks display. During the display in November 2005, eleven people were injured in an accident when a firework shot into the crowd.

In 2012 the park received over £1 million from the Heritage Lottery Fund towards the cost of restoration of the lake. Northamptonshire County Council and Kettering Borough Council also helped fund the work, which was completed in 2014. Barton Seagrave Hall was sold in 2012 to help fund the park.

In 2013 the BBC Children in Need event for BBC East was held here and had one of the choirs shown on the nationwide Children in Need Choir

On The Great Stand Up to Cancer Bake Off in 2019, comedian James Acaster made a baked replica of Wicksteed Park for his Showstopper challenge.

In 2016 the water chute at Wicksteed Park was given Grade II listed building status. At the end of the 2016 season, Wicksteed Park made the decision to close the double pirate ship due to high maintenance costs. The ride was sold to a businessman from Bulgaria.

Wicksteed Park was awarded a further £1.78 million by the National Lottery Heritage Fund in 2018 for a project to preserve the park's history.

In March 2020 the COVID-19 pandemic forced the closure of the attractions in the park, and in June 2020 Wicksteed Park Ltd announced that it had gone into administration. An appeal to save the amusement park raised £130,000 in donations from the public and £247,000 from the National Lottery Heritage Fund. A new company, Wicksteed Trading Ltd, was set up and bought most of the park's assets. The outdoor space was reopened in July 2020, with attractions and rides starting to open in the spring of 2021. An official reopening was scheduled for May 2021.

== Wicksteed Park Railway ==
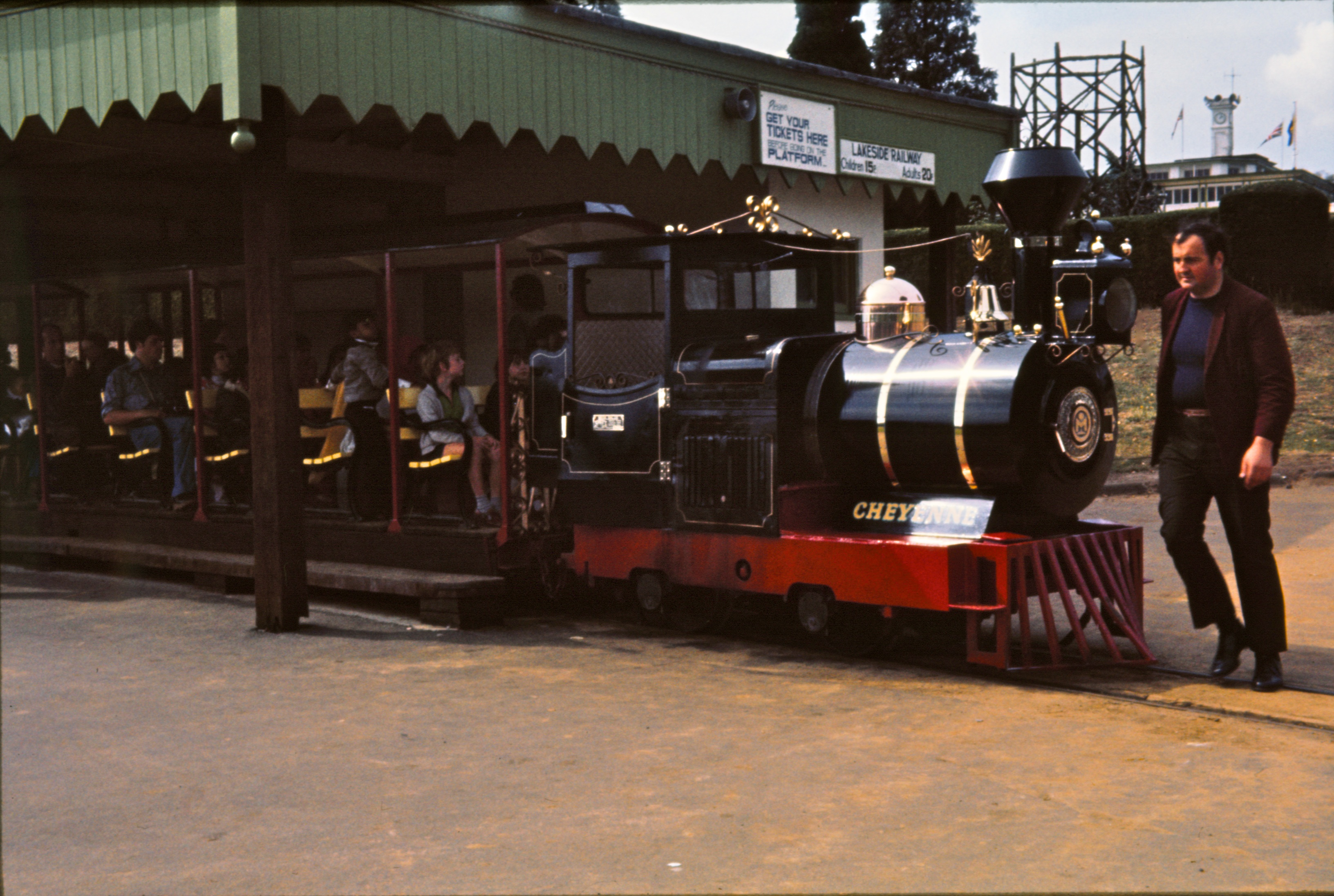
Locomotive "Cheyenne" at Wicksteed Park Railway in 1976

The 2 ft (610 mm) narrow-gauge Wicksteed Park railway is one of the features of the park. Over 15 million people have taken to its rails since it first opened in 1931. It was the last feature of the park to be added during the lifetime of the park's founder Charles Wicksteed and is supported by the Friends of the Wicksteed Park Railway.
