= Barton Hall Hotel, Barton Seagrave =

Hotel in Northamptonshire, England

Coordinates: 52.3866°N 0.6975°W

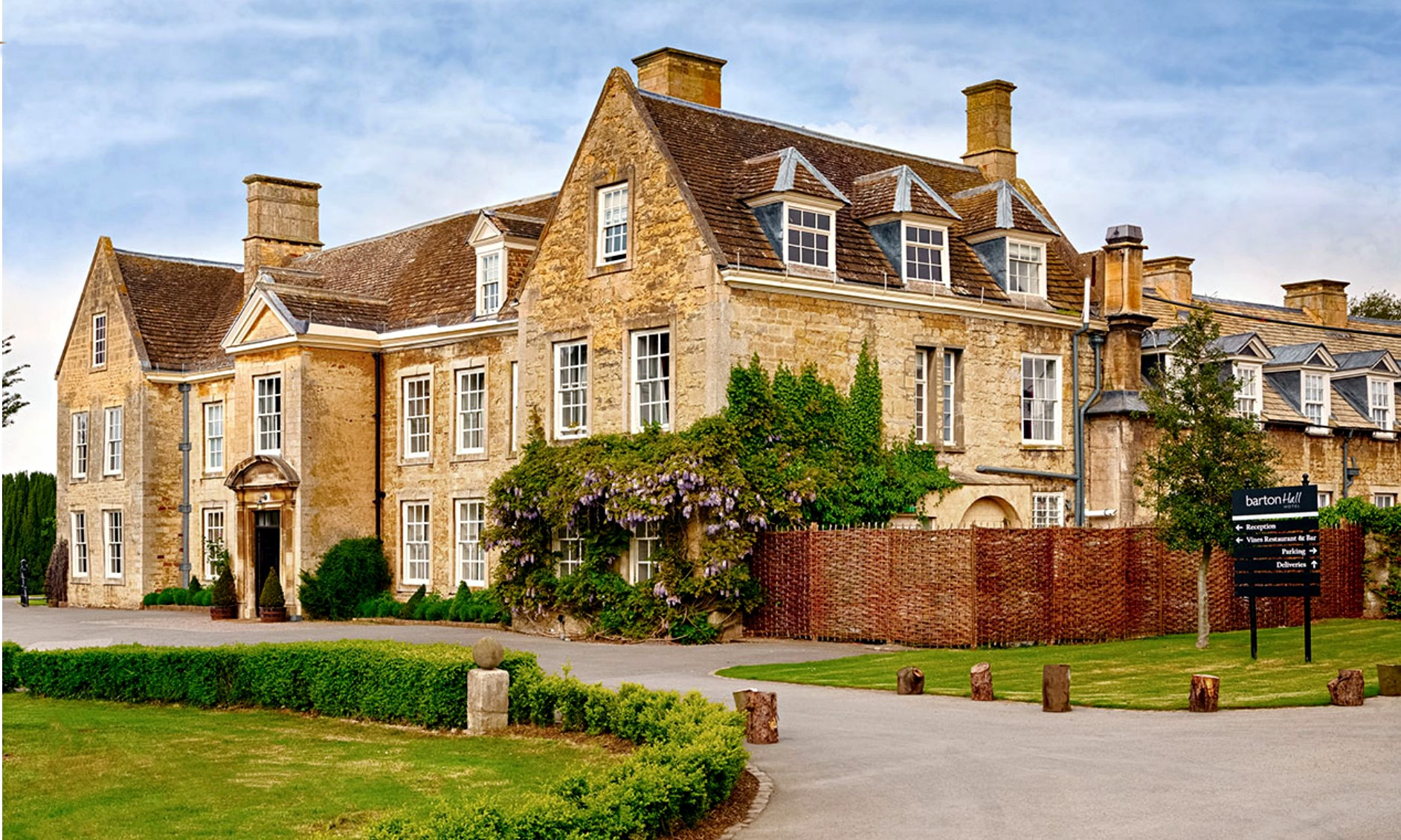
Barton Hall

Barton Seagrave Hall, now Barton Hall Hotel in Barton Seagrave, near Kettering, is a building of historical significance and is listed on the English Heritage Register. It was built in about 1550 and was the home of many notable residents over the next five centuries. Today it is a hotel which provides accommodation, restaurant facilities and caters for special events.

== Early owners ==
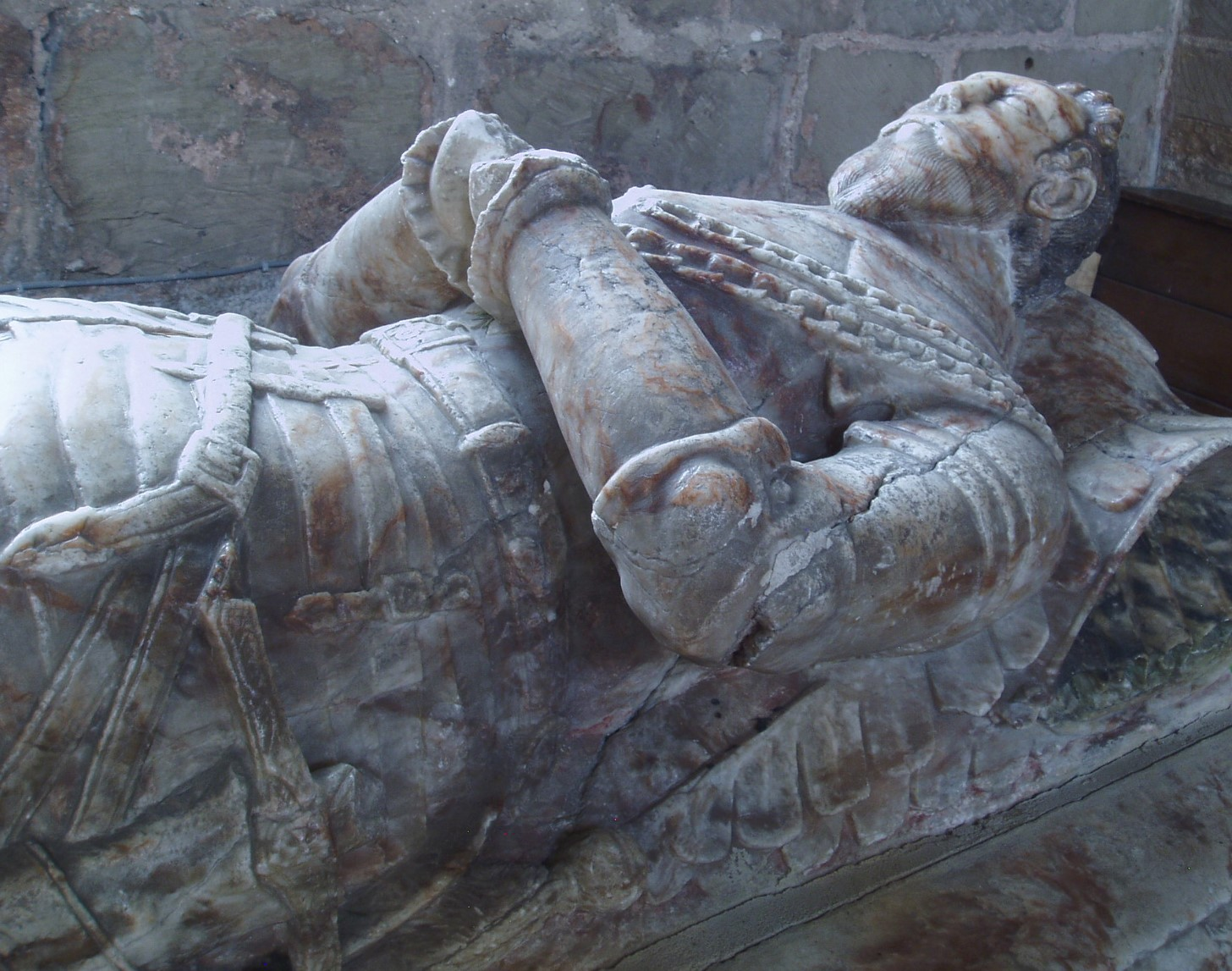
Tomb of William Humphrey who was the probable builder of Barton Hall

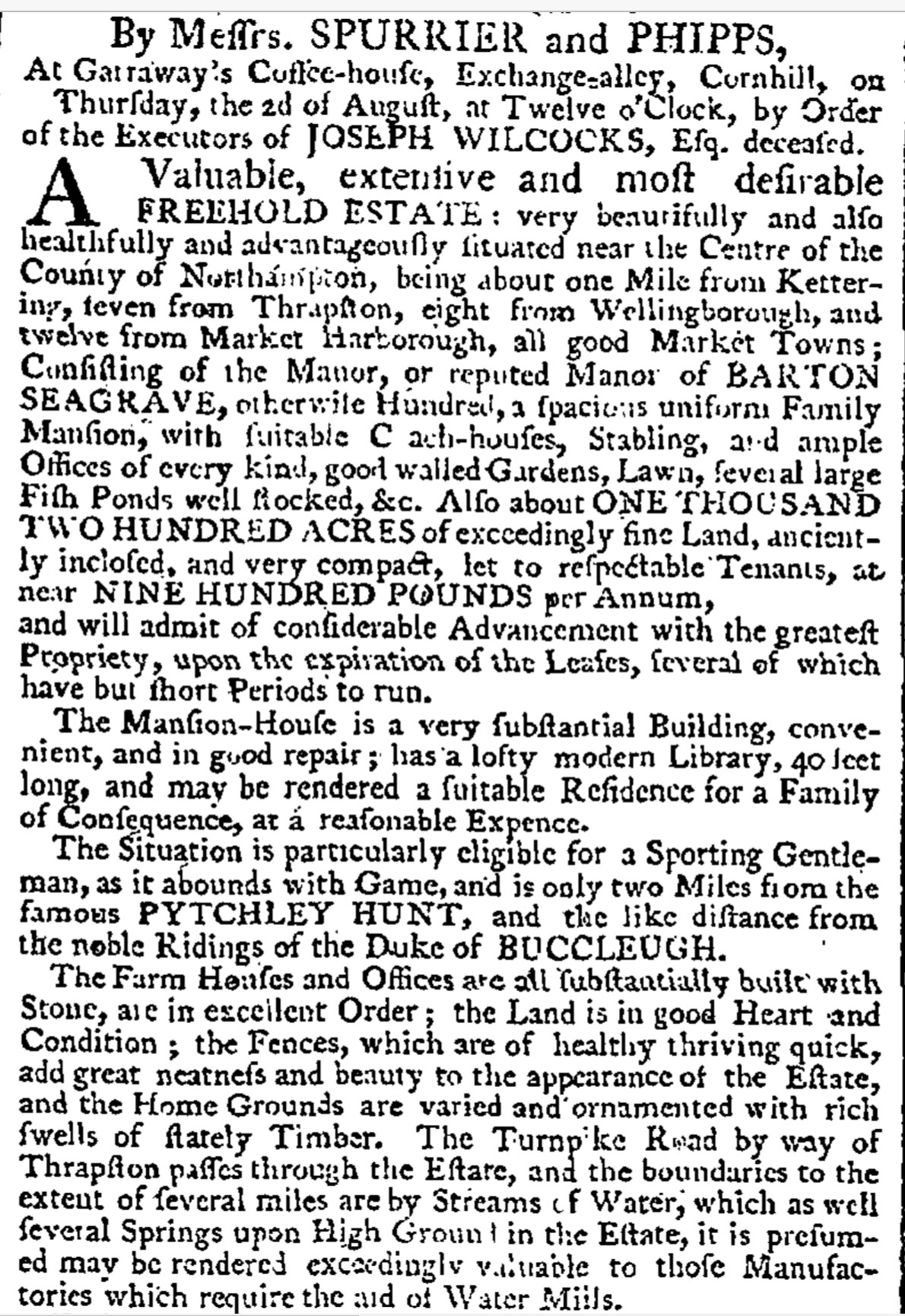
Advertisement for the sale of Barton Hall estate in 1792

The original Barton Seagrave Hall was built in about 1550 by the Humphrey family. At this time the owner of the property would have been William Humphrey (died 1591) and his wife Jane Lynne. They inherited the manor in 1553. He also owned land in Swepstone and the church there contains his tomb with his effigy dressed as a knight which is shown. Barton Hall passed down through the Humphrey family until 1665 when Nathaniel Humphrey sold it to John Bridges.

John Bridges (1642-1712) was the father of the historian John Bridges (1666-1724). He married Elizabeth Trumball who was the sister of Sir William Trumball, secretary of state. The couple had twelve children of whom John was the eldest and Charles Bridges, the painter the youngest. When he died in 1712 his eldest son John Bridges (1666-1724) inherited Barton Hall.

John Bridges (1666-1724) was a historian. He published the well known book called “The History and Antiquities of Northamptonshire”. He personally made a circuit of the county and employed several people to make drawings, collect information, and transcribe monuments and records. When he died in 1724 he left the property to his nephew John Bridges (1706-1741) who was the son of William Bridges. In 1733 he married Margaretta Horton who was his cousin. The couple had no children so when John died in 1741 he left Barton Hall to Margaretta and after her death to his relatives.

By 1749 the house had been sold by the Bridges family to Joseph Wilcocks (1673-1756), Bishop of Rochester. He used the property as his summer residence and entertained several notable people. When he died in 1756 his son Joseph Wilcocks (1724-1791) inherited the house. He lived there for some time before moving to Ladye Place in Berkshire. He did not marry and after he died in 1791 the property was sold. The advertisement for the sale is shown.

== Later owners ==
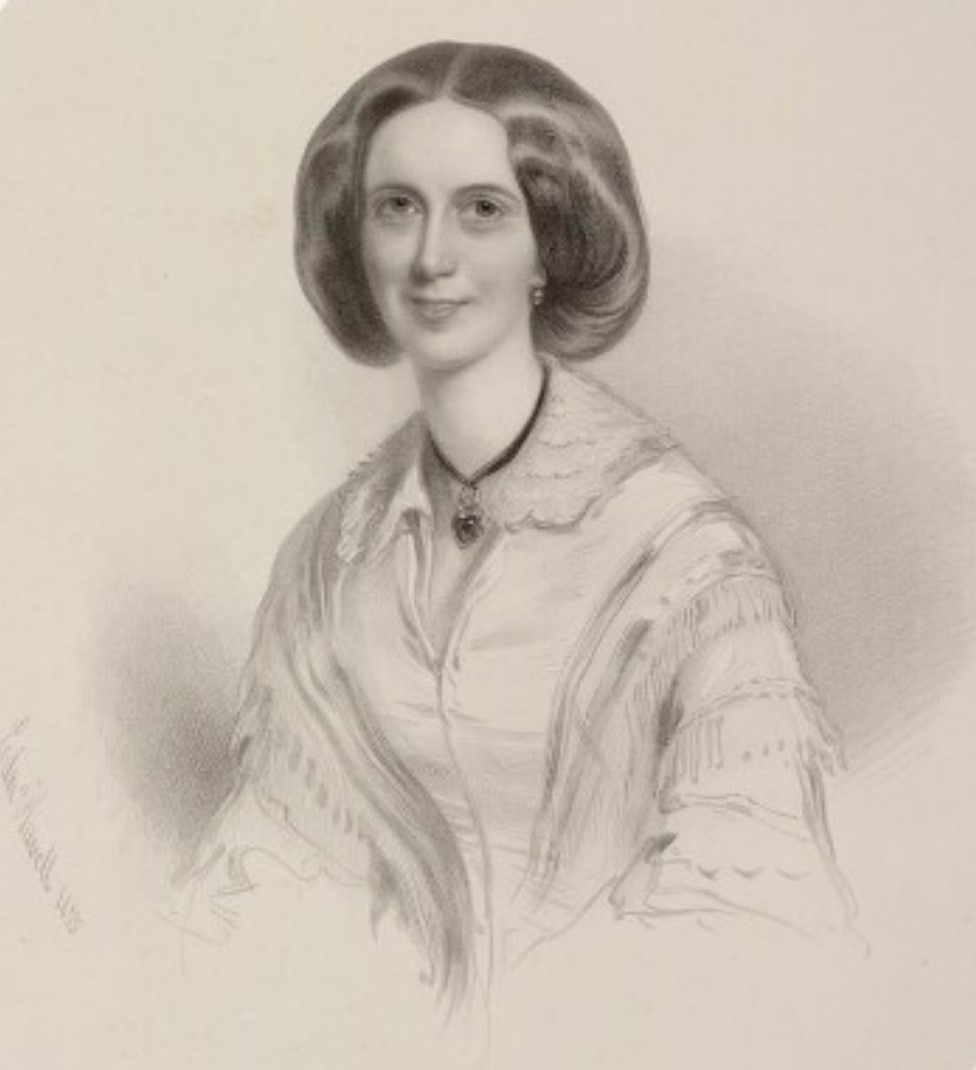
Mary isabella Tibbits later Viscountess Hood

Charles Tibbits (1764-1830) bought the house in 1791 at the time of his marriage to Mary Woodyeare (1763-1840). Charles was the son of Richard Tibbits (1771-1813) of Flecknoe and Wolfhamcote. Mary was the daughter of John Woodyeare of Crookhill. In 1793 Charles asked the famous landscaper Humphry Repton to redesign the garden close to the Hall. Repton compiled a Red Book which outlines his proposals.

Charles had one son Richard John Tibbits (1794-1821) but unfortunately he died at the age of only 27 leaving his wife Horatia Charlotte Lockwood (1797-1838) and only child Mary Isabella Tibbits (1818-1904) who was then three years old. As he predeceased his father, Barton Hall was left to his daughter Mary when Charles died in 1830. She owned the Hall for the next 74 years.

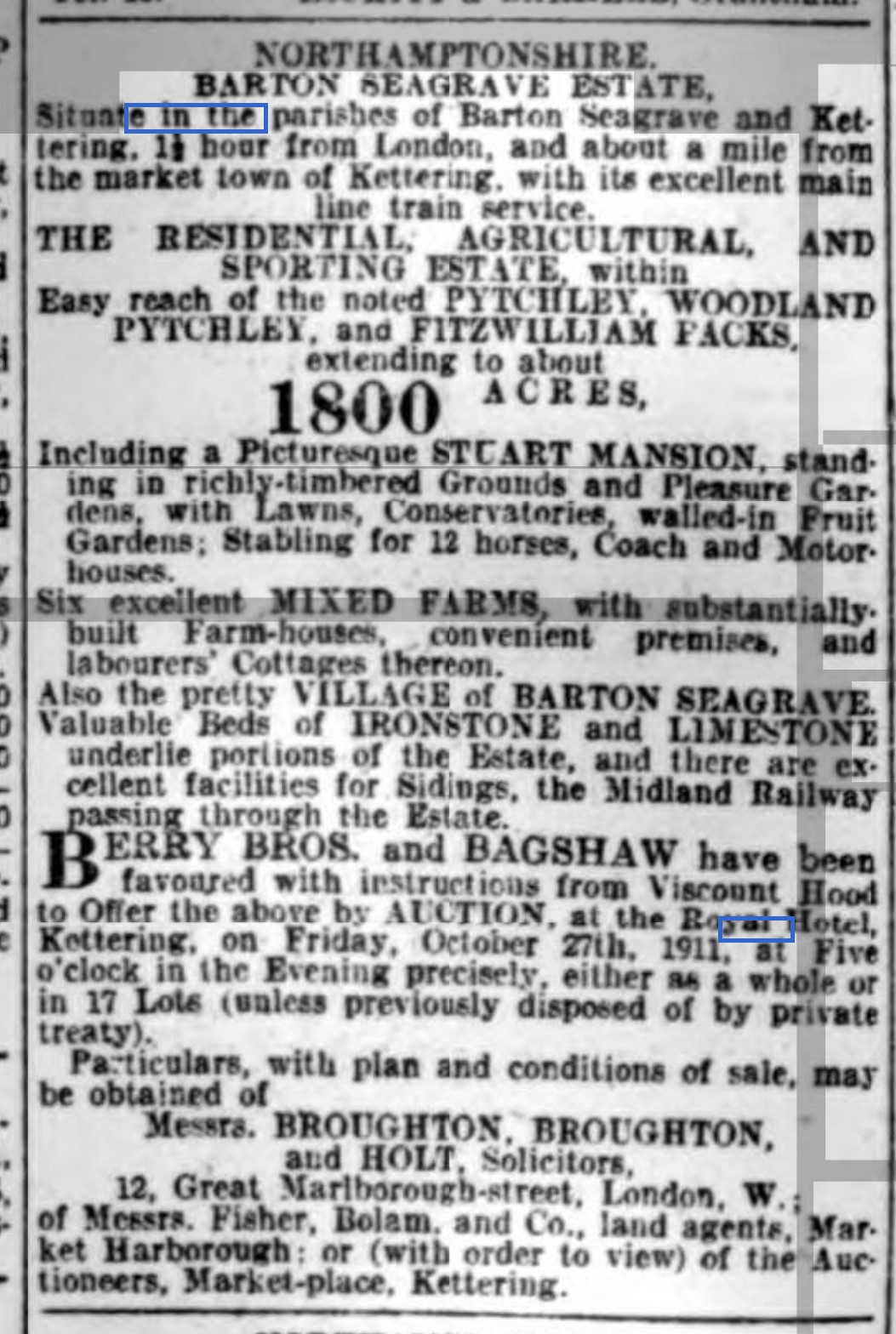
Sale notice for Barton Hall in 1911

Mary married Viscount Hood in 1837 becoming Viscountess Hood. She kept this name until the end of her life even though she married twice more after Samuel died in 1846. The couple had four sons and one daughter. In 1849 three years after Samuel’s death Viscountess Hood married George Hall (1801-1854) who was a doctor. She married thirdly John Borlasse Maunsell in 1858, a retired army officer who changed his surname to Tibbits by Royal Licence that same year.

When Mary died in 1904 her eldest son Francis Wheler Hood 4th Viscount Hood (1838-1907) inherited the estate and when he died in 1907 his son Grosvenor Arthur Frederick Hood 5th Viscount Hood (1868-1933) became the owner. In 1911 he decided to sell the whole estate which at that time was 1800 acres. The sale notice is shown.

It seems that at about this time the property was split. Charles Wicksteed bought a portion in 1913, Viscount Hood kept some of the farms and land and George Edward Stringer bought the Hall with about 65 acres.

George Edward Stringer (1853-1937) was a very wealthy colliery owner. In 1882 he married Edith Emily Harrison (1853-1922). Shortly after she died in 1922 George put Barton Hall on the market. In 1928 Charles Wicksteed bought the house and added it to his previously established Wicksteed Village Trust.

Under the Trust the Hall was used as hotel and event venue. In 1949 it became a nursing home for the elderly. In 2012 it was purchased from the Trust and converted back to a hotel. It serves this function today.
