= Barford Wood and Meadows =

Nature reserve in the United Kingdom

Coordinates: 52.434°N 0.739°W

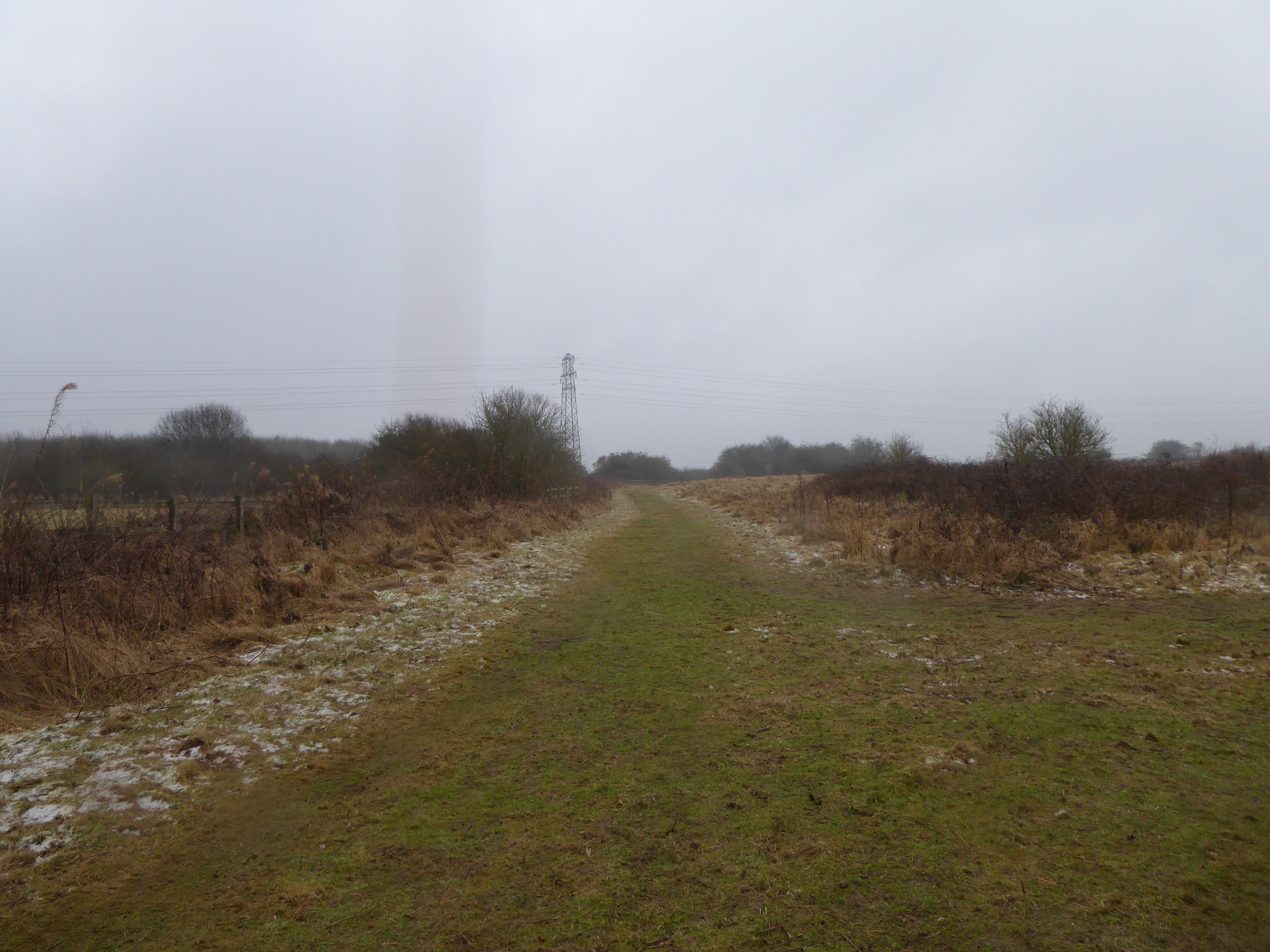
- Interactive map of Barford Wood and Meadows
- Type: Nature reserve
- Location: Rushton, Northamptonshire
- OS grid: SP 858 825
- Area: 36 hectares (89 acres)
- Manager: Wildlife Trust for Bedfordshire, Cambridgeshire and Northamptonshire

Barford Wood and Meadows or Barford Meadow Nature Reserve is a 36 hectare nature reserve east of Rushton in Northamptonshire. It is managed by the Wildlife Trust for Bedfordshire, Cambridgeshire and Northamptonshire. The north-eastern end is part of the River Ise and Meadows Site of Special Scientific Interest.

The site was formerly part of the medieval Royal Forest of Rockingham. It has diverse habitats, with hay meadows, parkland and recently planted woodland. There are many butterflies such as large skippers, orange-tips, small skippers and small coppers. Mammals include baders and red foxes.

There is access by a footpath from Rushton.
