= Dutch Doll of Finedon =

The Dutch Doll of Finedon was a wooden doll, originally housed at the Girls Charity School in Finedon, Northamptonshire. It was relocated to the Church of St Mary the Virgin in Finedon after the school moved in 1961. It was supposedly named for its similarity to the Dutch national costume, which likely resembled the uniforms worn by the girls who attended the school but "Dutch doll" was a common term for peg wooden dolls. In 1981, the doll was stolen from the church, much to the chagrin of locals, with no progress made in its recovery after investigation by local police.

== History ==
At the Girls Charity School, founded in 1712, the doll was mounted over the door, where it may have been attached to a mechanism causing it to move when the door was opened. It was believed that the doll had the supernatural ability to walk around, which led to legends about the doll's feet being chopped off. It is known that the doll was used as a threatened punishment whereby a child would be locked in a cellar with it.

The doll is carved from wood, 3 feet 6 inches (1.07 m) high, depicted in a blue dress, holding a bible in one hand and a scroll in the other which reads "Read Ye The Scriptures" John V. 39".

The mysterious nature of the doll's disappearance and the widespread belief in the legends held by the locals of the time, both children and adults alike, have been the subject of at least one novel.
