= Peter Whalley (priest) =

English clergyman, academic and schoolmaster

Peter Whalley (1722–1791) was an English clergyman, academic and schoolmaster. He is known as an antiquarian author and literary editor, and particularly as editor of John Bridges' county history of Northamptonshire.

== Life ==
Whalley was born on 2 September 1722 at Rugby, Warwickshire, the son of Peter Whalley, an attorney, and his wife Elizabeth. The family had longstanding Northamptonshire associations. He was educated at Merchant Taylors' School from 1731 to 1740, and in June 1740 was elected to a scholarship at St John's College, Oxford. He graduated B.A. in 1744, and proceeded B.C.L. in 1768. In 1743 he was elected to a fellowship at St John's College, and held it for some years.

He held a succession of ecclesiastical benefices: Holy Sepulchre in Northampton from 1748 to 1762; Ecton from 1762 to 1763; and Preston Deanery from 1753 to 1766. From 1752 he kept a school at Courteenhall, Northamptonshire. In 1760 he succeeded James Townley in the post of upper grammar master at Christ's Hospital, and retained it until the summer of 1776. From 1784 to 1789 he was headmaster of St Olave's Grammar School, Southwark. He was appointed on 5 February 1766 by the corporation of the City of London to the rectory of the united parishes of St Margaret Pattens and St Gabriel, Fenchurch Street, London; and in 1768 he was presented by Christ's Hospital to the vicarage of Horley in Surrey. Both these preferments he retained until his death.

Whalley married, on 16 January 1768, Betsey Jacobs of List Lane. He was in later life involved in money troubles. He lived for some months concealed in the house of his friend Francis Godolphin Waldron, but his hiding-place was discovered and he left for Flanders. After a few months' residence there he died at Ostend on 12 June 1791. His library was sold in 1792.

His widow survived until 16 March 1803.

== Works ==
When in 1755 Benjamin Buckler declined the work of preparing for publication the manuscripts of John Bridges' county history of Northamptonshire, the task was given to Whalley. The first volume of Bridges's History and Antiquities of Northamptonshire was brought out by Whalley in 1762, and the first part of the second volume appeared in 1769. A protracted delay then ensued, for financial reasons; the finished work came out in 1791 in two folio volumes.

Whalley edited in 1756 the Works of Ben Jonson in seven volumes, and the edition was reissued, as far as regards the dramatic works, in conjunction with those of Beaumont and Fletcher, in 1811. Waldron, in his continuation of Jonson's The Sad Shepherd (1783), reproduced and expanded Whalley's annotations. Whalley went on with preparations for a second edition of Jonson's works, which Waldron commenced publishing in 1792 in numbers. The issue stopped with the second number.

Whalley's original works were:

- An Essay on the Manner of Writing History (anon.) (1746)
- An Enquiry into the Learning of Shakespeare (1748)
- Vindication of the Evidences and Authenticity of the Gospels from the Objections of the late Lord Bolingbroke (1753)

== Bibliography ==
- Brown, Tony; Foard, Glenn (1994). The Making of a County History: John Bridges' Northamptonshire. Leicester: University of Leicester; Northamptonshire County Council. ISBN 0-947590-20-X.
- Brown, A. E. (2004). "Whalley, Peter (1722–1791)". Oxford Dictionary of National Biography (online ed.). Oxford University Press. doi:10.1093/ref:odnb/29160. (Subscription or UK public library membership required.)
- Courtney, W.P. (1885–1900). "Whalley, Peter" . Dictionary of National Biography. London: Smith, Elder & Co.

Attribution

This article incorporates text from a publication now in the public domain: "Whalley, Peter". Dictionary of National Biography. London: Smith, Elder & Co. 1885–1900.
