= John Minney =

English cricketer (1939–2016)

John Harry Minney
Personal information
- Born: 25 April 1939
- Died: 1 April 2016 (aged 76); Finedon, Northamptonshire
- Batting: Right-handed
- Role: Batsman

Domestic team information
- Years: Team
- 1959–1961: Cambridge University
- 1961–1967: Northamptonshire

Career statistics
Competition	FC
Matches	19
Runs scored	572
Batting average	19.06
100s/50s	0/1
Top score	58
Catches/stumpings	10/–
- Source: CricketArchive, 19 April 2016

John Harry Minney (25 April 1939 – 1 April 2016) was an English cricketer active from 1959 to 1967 who played for Cambridge University and Northamptonshire. He appeared in 19 first-class matches as a righthanded batsman who bowled right arm medium pace. Minney was born in Finedon, Northamptonshire on 25 April 1939, and died in 2016. He scored 572 runs with a highest score of 58.

He made his debut for Northants in the 1961 season, when he played three matches. He returned to the side six years later to play two further games, making his highest score of 58 against Middlesex in his final innings.
