= Swanspool Lake =

Lake in Wellingborough, England

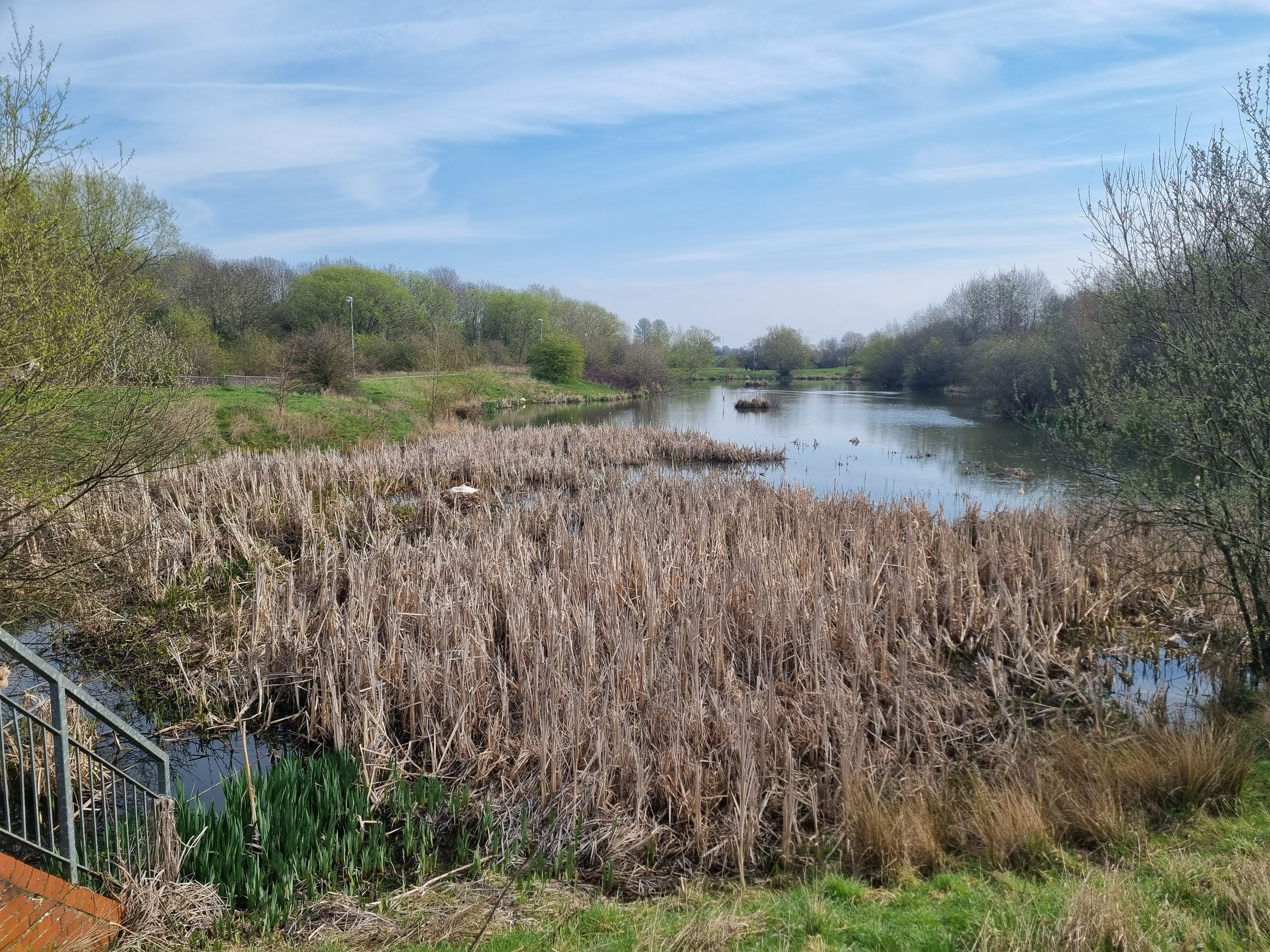
- View from western shore

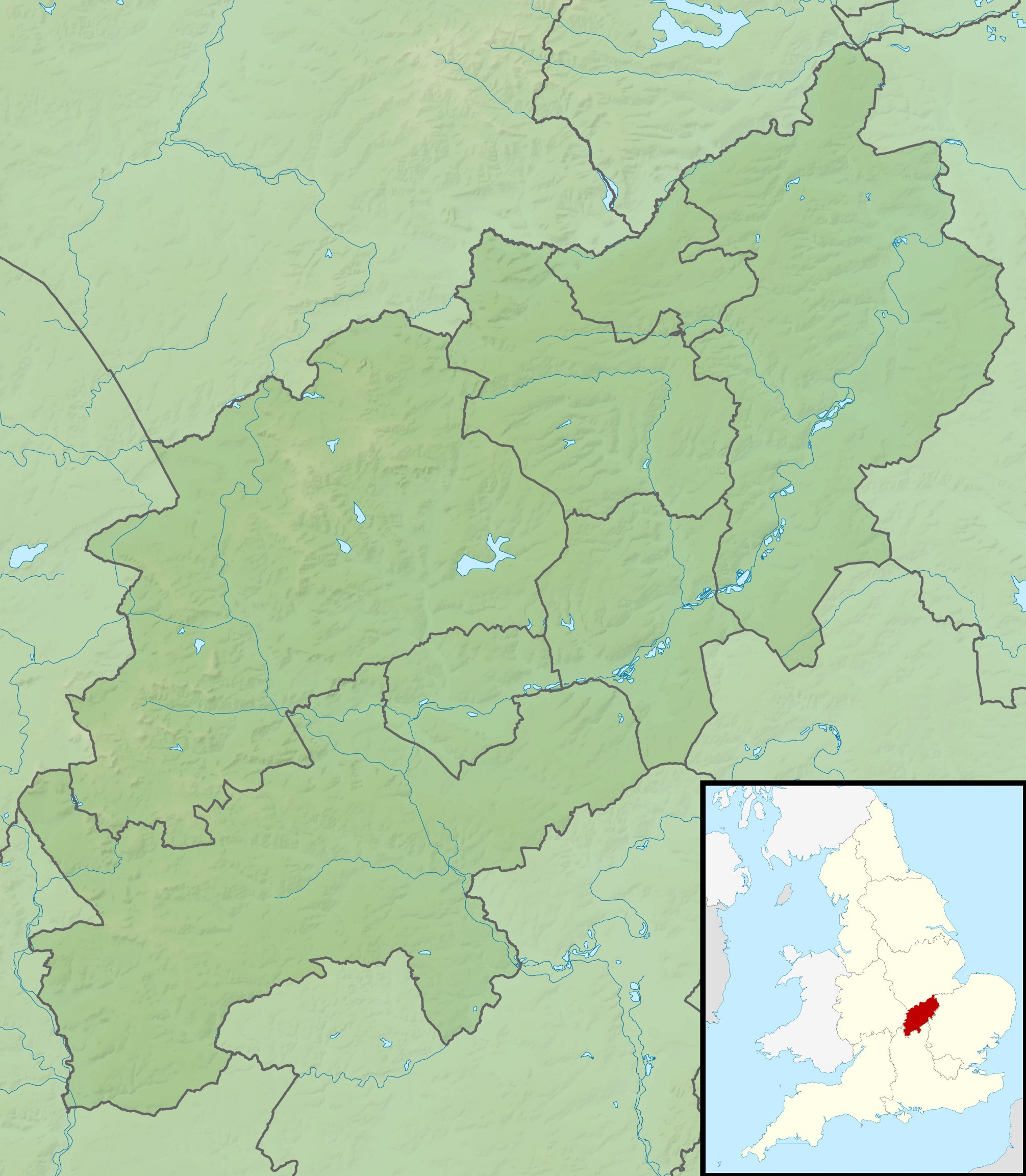
- Location within Northamptonshire
- Coordinates: 52°17′28″N 0°42′51″W
- Primary outflows: Swanspool Brook
- Basin countries: England
- Max. length: 170 m (560 ft)
- Max. width: 43 m (141 ft)
- Settlements: Wellingborough

Swanspool Lake is a lake in the southern part of Wellingborough, Northamptonshire, England. Situated south west of Croyland Park, the lake is a nesting ground for mute swans and other wildlife and is a popular fishing and angling destination.
