= David Imms =

English artist and painter

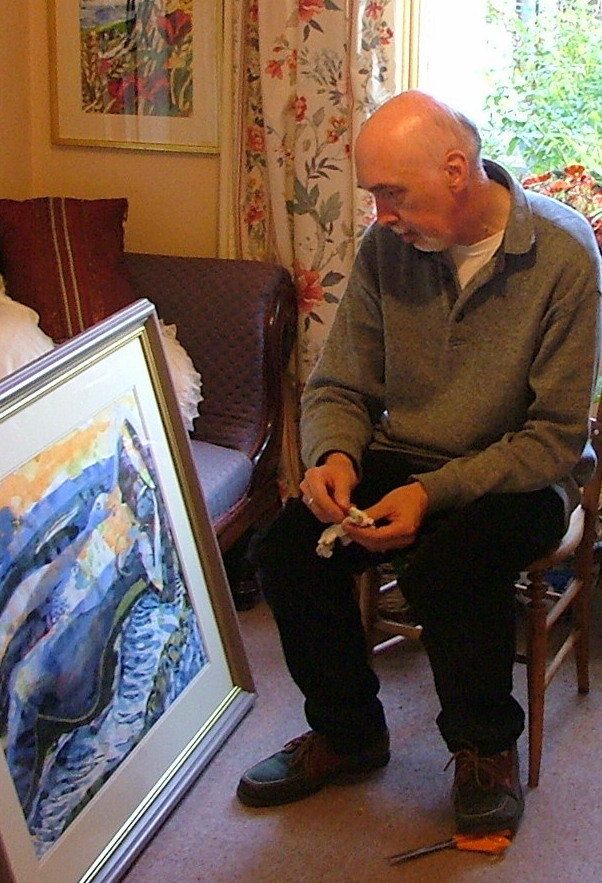
- David Imms in 2004
- Born: 1945 (age 80–81)
- Education: Central School of Art and Design London
- Occupation: Artist
- Spouse: Married

David Imms (born 1945) is an English artist and painter.

Imms was born near Derby and studied at Derby College of Art (1962–64) and at Central School of Art and Design, London (1964–67).

He has had numerous one-man exhibitions and his work is widely represented in private and public collections including the Victoria and Albert Museum, University of London, Queen Mary College London, Derby Museum and Art Gallery and Plymouth City Museum and Art Gallery.

His work is influenced by the West Country landscape and reflects literary and historical associations, such as Thomas Hardy's Dorset, and the prehistoric earthworks and standing stones of Wiltshire.

Awarded the Northern Arts Purchase Award and Llewellyn Smith Scholarship. Imms lives and works in Finedon, Northamptonshire.
