= Charles Bridges (painter) =

English painter (1672–1747)

- Born: 1672
- Died: December 1747 (aged 74–75)
- Occupations: Painter, missionary
- Notable work: Portrait of Alexander Spotswood (1736); Portrait of James Blair (c. 1735–43)
- Spouse: Alice Flower (m. 1687)

Charles Bridges (1672 – December 1747) was an English painter and missionary active in the British colony of Virginia from 1735 to 1744. He is the first documented painter known to have worked in Virginia.

== Life and career ==
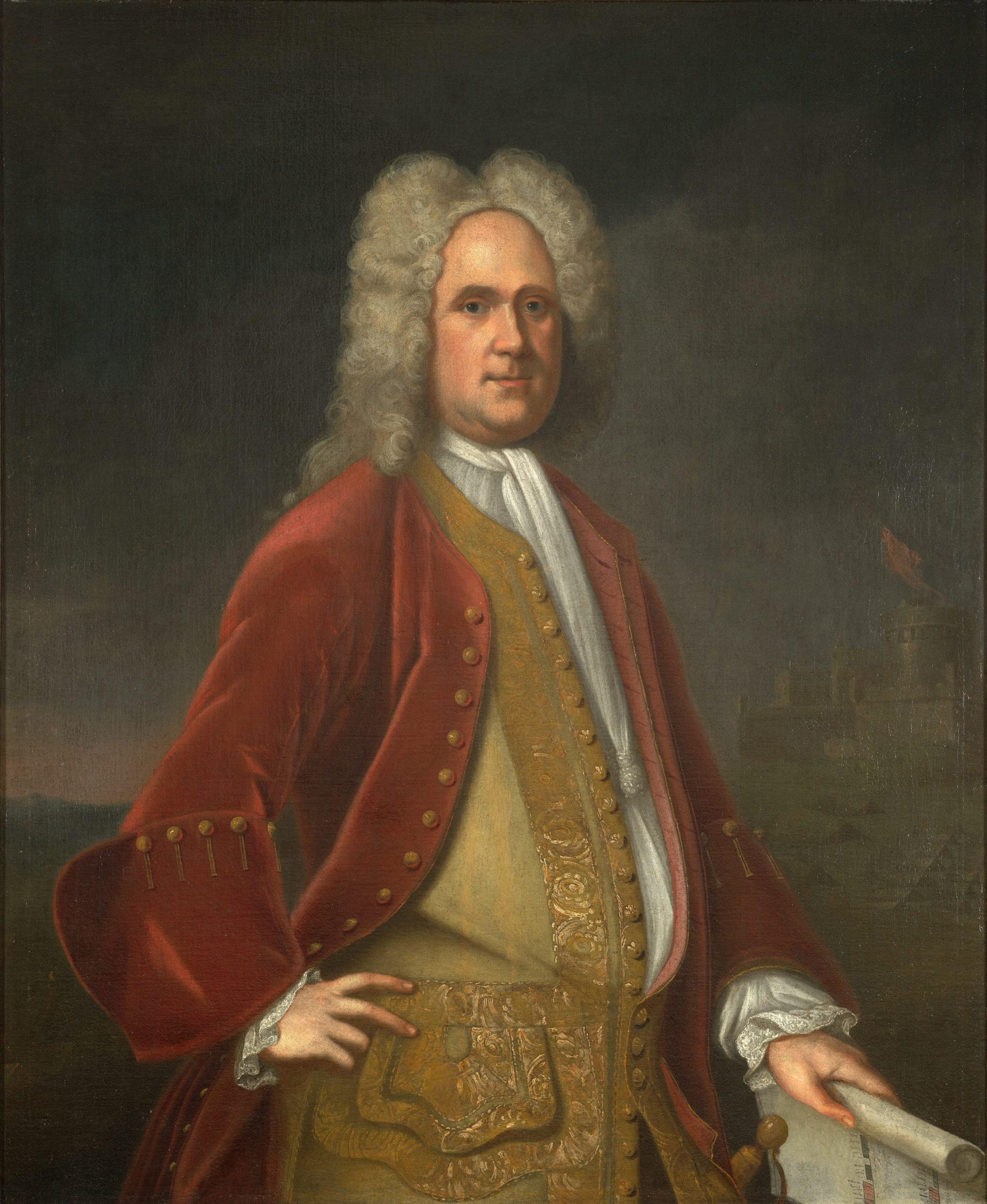
Alexander Spotswood, 1736, oil on canvas, hanging in the Governor's Palace in Williamsburg

Bridges was christened in the parish of Barton Seagrave in Northamptonshire, and was the son of John Bridges and Elizabeth Trumbull Bridges. His family was of the gentry, and was well-educated; a brother, John Bridges, was a barrister and well-regarded historian of Northamptonshire. He married Alice Flower on 4 August 1687, at Saint Marylebone, near London; the couple had at least three children, a son and two daughters. Bridges was a member of the Society for Promoting Christian Knowledge, having worked for the organization in London from 1699 to 1713 and serving for a time as a liaison to local charity schools. Just when Bridges became a painter is unknown, though it is assumed that he had some training. Only one portrait is firmly documented dating to before his sojourn in Virginia; it depicts Thomas Baker, a fellow of Saint John's College, University of Cambridge, and was painted sometime after 1717. It is today in the collection of the University of Oxford.

Bridges contemplated moving to Georgia in 1733; he is likely to have been a widower by that point, as men of his age seldom considered emigrating to the colonies. Nevertheless, he came to Virginia with his children, arriving in Williamsburg in 1735 armed with letters of introduction to James Blair and lieutenant governor William Gooch. Soon he met William Byrd II, with whom he lived for a period at Westover Plantation while painting the Byrd children; family tradition states that Byrd met Bridges in England, in the studio of Sir Godfrey Kneller, but this has not been substantiated. Byrd wrote on his behalf to Alexander Spotswood, describing him as "a man of a good family," who was forced "either by the frowns of fortune, or his own mismanagement," to work as a painter; the planter further commented that Bridges, though he might "have not the Masterly Hand of a Lilly, or a Kneller, yet had he lived so long ago as when places were given to the most Deserving, he might have pretended to be the Sergeant-Painter of Virginia." With Blair and Edmund Gibson (who with Thomas Gooch had provided one of his letters of introduction to the colony), Bridges discussed the possibility of establishing a charity to teach Christianity to Virginia's African-American community. The endeavor came to nothing, likely because Christianity was associated in the minds of many local planters with the notion of freedom, and because Blair and Bridges lacked the energy necessary to see the project through.

Bridges remained friendly with Byrd, being mentioned in his diaries as a visitor to Westover twice, in August 1739 and January 1740. He was one of the witnesses to the will of Sir John Randolph in 1735. One of his daughters died in Williamsburg on 24 August 1736; that December, he rented a house in town for the duration of a year. He then moved to Hanover County, where he stayed until returning to England, sometime around 1744. He died in his native Northamptonshire, and is buried in the church of Warkton. Descendants of the painter have been traced in the United States.

It has been suggested that Bridges' decision to return to England may have served as a prompt for William Dering to begin portrait painting, and some historians have surmised that Dering purchased painting supplies from Bridges prior to the latter's departure.

== Work ==
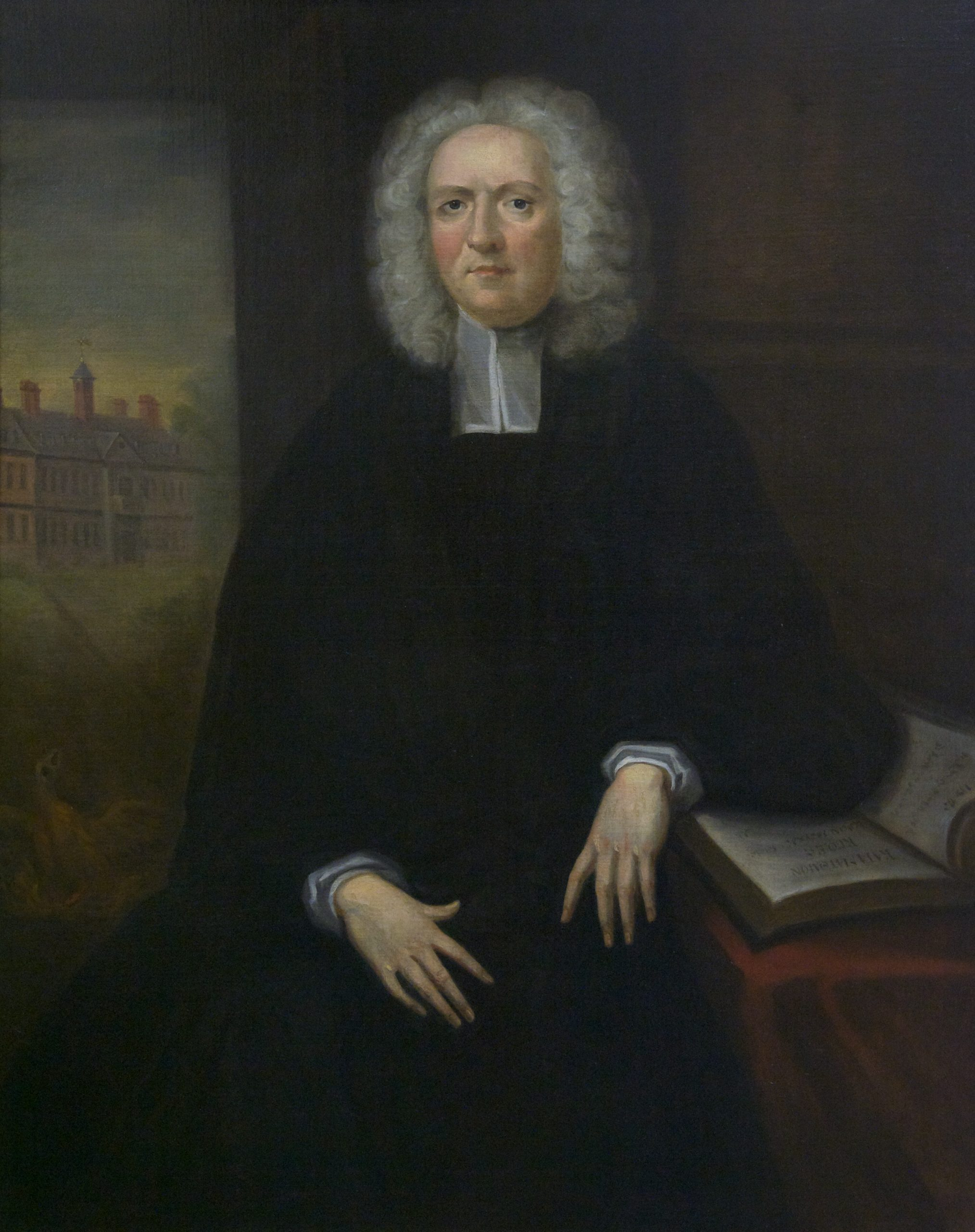
James Blair, c. 1735–43, oil on canvas, in the collection of the College of William and Mary

Only a handful of portraits by Bridges are documented with certainty, including a number mentioned by Byrd in his letter to Spotswood, one of William Gooch, and one of Mrs. Mann Page II and Child today owned by the College of William and Mary. Based on these known paintings, a body of work has been developed; there are, however, numerous uncertainties of attribution. Bridges did not sign his work, and other documentation is lacking; this, coupled with the uneven condition of surviving paintings, precludes certain identification of many pieces. Further complicating the problem is the lack of a significant number of works from England to provide stylistic evidence; there are also indications that another painter, hitherto unidentified but stylistically similar, was active in the colony in the 1720s.

Bridges' style can be identified by a variety of mannerisms of technique and color. He used broad brushstrokes in the delineation of faces, hair, and fabrics. Features, especially eyes, were drawn carefully and precisely. Colors are usually muted, and red is often used to define shadows. The composition of many portraits is similar, with the heads and figures turned slightly to one side and the subjects looking directly out at the viewer.

Besides the aforementioned works, portraits attributed to Bridges on the basis of style include William Prentis, Augustine Moore, Mrs. Augustine Moore and Child, Mann Page II, and John Bolling, Jr. Also attributed to him is the portrait of James Blair hanging in the Wren Building at the College of William and Mary. Paintings attributed to Bridges may also be found in the collections of Washington and Lee University, the Colonial Williamsburg Foundation, and the Virginia Historical Society. A painting in the Metropolitan Museum of Art, formerly attributed to him and said to have been a portrait of Maria Taylor Byrd, has since been reassigned to the "school of Sir Godfrey Kneller". As is the case with many colonial painters, Bridges is known to have done non-portrait work as well, having been recorded in 1740 as being paid by Caroline County for "drawing the King's Arms for the use of the County Court", an act for which the county was required to sell 1600 pounds of tobacco. The portrait of James Blair is also notable for containing, in its background, one of the earliest depictions of the Wren Building.
