= The Latimer Arts College =

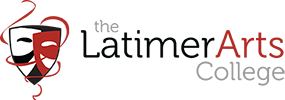

Location
- Castle Way, Barton Seagrave; Kettering, Northamptonshire, NN15 6SW; England; 52.3810°N 0.6933°W

Information
- Type: Foundation school
- Motto: Unlocking Potential – Inspiring Excellence
- Local authority: North Northamptonshire
- Department for Education URN: 122066 Tables
- Ofsted: Reports
- Principal: Kathryn Murphy
- Gender: Co-educational
- Age: 11 to 18
- Enrolment: 1134
- Houses: Attenborough; Gilbert; Kahlo; Tull
- Colour
- Website: www.latimer.org.uk

The Latimer Arts College is a local authority-maintained secondary school and sixth form for students aged 11 to 18, located in Barton Seagrave, Northamptonshire.

== History ==
The Latimer Arts College opened in 1976 as Latimer School.

In 1997, it became a specialist performing arts college, rebranding to Latimer Community Arts College. Shortly thereafter, in 1998, it received a £1.7 million grant to build a community performing arts centre – The Masque Theatre.

In 2007, the College changed its name to The Latimer Arts College – as it is known today.

Since 2019, the College has been the only local authority-maintained secondary school in Northamptonshire.

== Academic standards ==
The most recent Ofsted inspection, from April 2023, stated "The Latimer Arts College continues to be a good school".

In 2025, it was ranked as the eleventh best-performing state secondary school in Northamptonshire, based on an above average Progress 8 score at GCSE. In 2024, the average A Level grade attained by Sixth Form students was C+, placing the college seventh among state sixth forms in Northamptonshire.

== The Masque Theatre ==
The Latimer Arts College is the base for The Masque Theatre, a community performing arts centre operated on behalf of the College by Schools Plus. The Masque Theatre has a 200-seat theatre, drama and dance studios, music rooms, recording studios, and a meeting and conference room.

== Sixth form ==
The former community centre was refurbished and opened as the new 'SixthForm@Latimer' building on 9 December 2024, with dedicated spaces for both studying and socialising.

== Notable former students ==
- Mae Stephens, singer and songwriter.
