= Barton Seagrave =

Village in Northamptonshire, England

Coordinates: 52.3792°N 0.6939°W

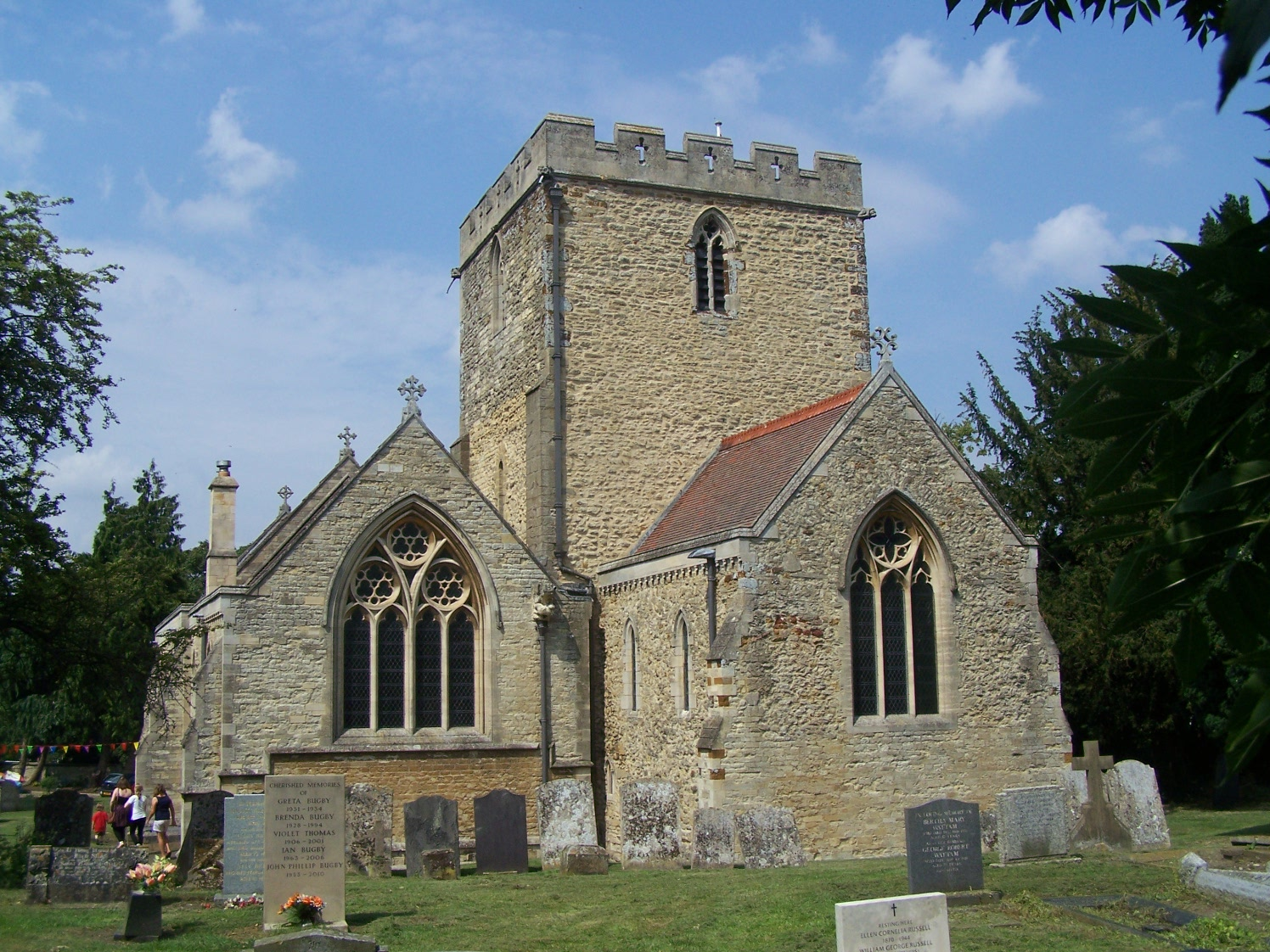
- St Botolph's parish church

- Location within Northamptonshire
- Population: 4,418 (2011 Census)
- OS grid reference: SP890765
  - London: 81 miles (130 km)
- Unitary authority: North Northamptonshire
- Ceremonial county: Northamptonshire
- Region: East Midlands
- Country: England
- Sovereign state: United Kingdom
- Post town: Kettering
- Postcode district: NN15
- Dialling code: 01536
- Police: Northamptonshire
- Fire: Northamptonshire
- Ambulance: East Midlands
- UK Parliament: Kettering

Barton Seagrave is a large village and civil parish in North Northamptonshire, England. The village is about 1.5 miles (2.4 km) south-east of Kettering's town centre. The older part of the village is known for its Norman Church and attractive buildings.

The village's name means 'barley farm'. 'Seagrave' was added after the manor passed to Stephen de Segrave in 1220.

== Demographics ==
The 2011 Census recorded a parish population of 4,418 in 1,843 homes.

== Transport ==
The A6 road linking London and Leicester joins the A14 road just to the south of the village. The A14 joins the M1 motorway at junction 19 (Catthorpe Interchange) offering easy access to Huntingdon, Felixstowe and London.

The Midland Main Line runs to the west of the village, partly along the edge of the River Ise. The nearest station is Kettering railway station, which opened in 1857 and is maintained by East Midlands Railway, which run services to London, Sheffield, Corby and Derby.

The village used to be connected with Cambridge by rail via the Kettering, Thrapston and Huntingdon Railway, until this was closed in 1961 due to the Beeching cuts. Part of the route of the branch can still be viewed today and is in use as a footpath.

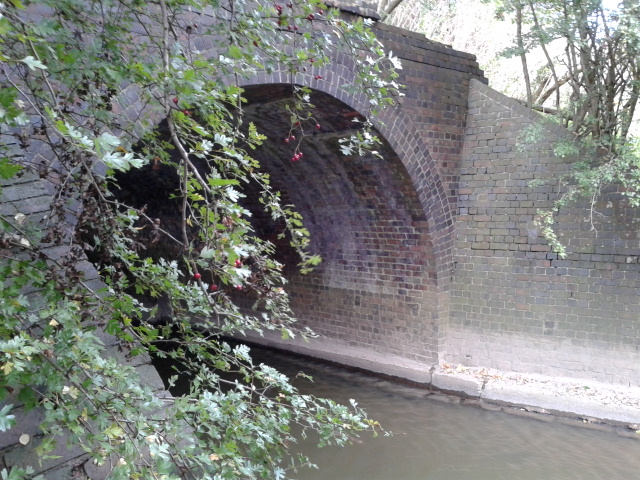
A bridge over the River Ise on the abandoned Kettering, Thrapston and Huntingdon Railway. The route of the line can be traced to the south of the village.

== Governance ==
There are two tiers of local government covering Barton Seagrave, at parish and unitary authority level: Barton Seagrave Parish Council and North Northamptonshire Council. The parish council meets at the village hall at 11 Bertone Road, which was completed in 2017.

Barton Seagrave was an ancient parish. When elected parish and district councils were created in 1894 it was given a parish council and included in the Kettering Rural District. The parish was abolished in 1935 and most of the area, including the village itself, was transferred into the urban district of Kettering, which subsequently became a municipal borough in 1938. The borough was reformed and enlarged in 1974 to become the Borough of Kettering. Barton Seagrave was re-established as a separate parish within the wider borough in 2002. The borough of Kettering was abolished in 2021 to become part of North Northamptonshire.

== Facilities ==
The village has a wide range of amenities, including a convenience store on Gotch Road, a full-service Post Office on St Botolph's Road and a petrol station beside the A6 on the outermost limits of the village. There is a Community Centre on Castle Way, along with the Masque Theatre, and a new (201&) village hall in the Redrow estate off St Botolph's Road / Polwell Lane.

The large and lively church, St Botolph's, is located at the village green, adjacent to the war memorial. They provide groups for all ages, from mums and tots to seniors' groups, plus youth groups and regular social events for the community.

== Environment ==
The village is home to the Castle Fields Wildlife Trust site. This is managed by the Wicksteed Trust and is a haven for plants, including Meadowsweet. A footpath runs through the reserve to the arboretum at Wicksteed Park and sheep graze in the reserve during the summer.

There is also a pocket park, Wallis Spinney, a strip of woodland which lies within the Ise Valley, south-east of the church, which is accessible via Belvoir Drive. The Spinney is cut into three areas by a road and a tarmac footpath and is the site of ancient woodland consisting mainly of ash and field maple. It is named after a local farmer, Samuel Wallis, and was once owned by Wicksteed Park. It is thought that most trees were planted in the 17th century, although it is probable that woodland existed prior to this. There is evidence of coppicing, hedge-laying and a boundary ditch, possibly from a medieval field system.

== Education ==
The village has three schools, with a forth one under construction. The Latimer Arts College is a secondary school at the top of Castle Way. It has an emphasis on the performing arts. and has a theatre and dance studios. Hanwood Park School is a co-educational, comprehensive secondary school due to open in 2024 on the new Hanwood Park development at Barton Point.

Barton Seagrave Primary School is on an adjacent wooded site, and has recently expanded to three-form entry after an extensive building program ending in 2016. Hayfield's Cross Church of England School is a primary school that opened in 2015, on the new development to the east of Barton Road. It opened significantly in advance of the houses that would supply its pupils.

== Expansion proposals ==
The northern border of the village is Wicksteed Park. There is considerable development to the south and east, with new warehouse developments to the south of the A14 in adjacent Burton Latimer, on former agricultural land.

Many new homes have been built to the north of St Botolph's Road / Polwell Lane, extending the developed land towards Wicksteed Park. Further homebuilding to the east of Barton Seagrave will considerably expand the village. This development is expected to ultimately include three primary schools (one of which opened in 2015), a secondary school and local facilities such as shops and doctors' surgeries.

== Notable buildings ==
=== Church ===
The village has one of the oldest churches in Kettering, parts of which date from 1120 to 1130 AD, although much of the rest is 13th century. It is the Norman Church of England parish church of Saint Botolph, locally known as 'St Bot's'. There are memorials to Jane Floyde (died 1616) wife of Hugh Floyde, rector, who is depicted at a prayer desk attended by five children, and also to three John Bridges (died 1712), the county historian (died 1724) and another (died 1741). The Bridges family lived at Barton Seagrave Hall. Barton Seagrave War Memorial is in the church grounds.

=== Rectory ===
This building was built around 1700, although the south side was rebuilt in 1806. It is currently in use as 'Church House', providing community facilities, accommodation and church offices.

=== Castle ===
South-west of the village centre is the site of Barton Seagrave Castle. This was built in the early part of the 14th century by Nicholas Segrave the younger, but became ruined after 1433. It was surrounded by a moat, and another moat lies to the north of the castle site. These can still be seen today.

=== Barton Seagrave Hall and Wicksteed Park ===
(see also Barton Hall Hotel, Barton Seagrave)

Originally built in 1550 by the Humphrey family, Barton Seagrave Hall was bought in 1665 by John Bridges (1642–1712) of Warwickshire, son of the parliamentarian Major Bridges of Alcester. John was Sheriff of Northampton in 1675. After his John died, his son John Bridges (1666–1742) inherited the house. He was an antiquarian and a Fellow of the Royal Society. The house passed to his brother, William (1668–1741) who carried out more renovations started by his father – the date 1725 being on the lead rain-water heads. However, he fell into debt and was forced to mortgage the house in 1733. Later that century the house was owned by the Wilcox family then Richard Tibbits whose son was responsible for modernising the house further. Lady Mary Isabella Hood-Tibbits lived at the house for many years until her death in 1904 when the house came up for sale and was bought by Charles Wicksteed. He laid out Wicksteed Park within its boundaries. On his death, the house and the park passed to the Wicksteed Village Trust. It was a hotel for a while, then a nursing home for the elderly. For a while it housed part of the NHS on the ground floor, before becoming an arts centre. The first floor and stables accommodated the artists and designers. It is now home to the Vines Restaurant and the Barton Hall Hotel. It can also be hired out for weddings and other events.

The house is of two stories, of limestone and roofed with Collyweston slates. The main front faces south and has projecting end-wings with plain gables and a middle gabled porch of two stories with classic doorway. A wing at the east end containing a number of small rooms appears to be older than the rest of the building. The Orangery is a grade I Listed Building.

== Notable residents ==
Rear Admiral Horace Hood once lived in Barton Hall as a member of the Hood Family. He was killed on HMS Invincible during the Battle of Jutland in May 1916, and his name is on the Barton Seagrave War Memorial.

The soprano singer Elizabeth Harwood was born in the village on 27 May 1938, but moved to Yorkshire at an early age.

Other natives of the village include topographer John Bridges and his brother, Charles, a painter.

MP Phillip Hollobone lived in the village.

Broadcaster and priest Richard Coles grew up in Barton Seagrave.
