= William Adams (cricketer, born 1885) =

English cricketer

Cricket information
- Batting: Left-handed

Career statistics
Competition	First-class
Matches	38
Runs scored	1,125
Batting average	18.14
100s/50s	2/4
Top score	154*
Balls bowled	108
Wickets	0
Bowling average	–
5 wickets in innings	–
10 wickets in match	–
Best bowling	–
Catches/stumpings	5/–
- Source: CricketArchive, 10 October 2022

William Adams (17 April 1885 – 6 April 1957) was an English first-class cricketer. He was a left-handed batsman who played first-class cricket for Northamptonshire. He was born in Steeple Claydon, Buckinghamshire and died in Ashton, Northamptonshire.

Adams had represented Buckinghamshire on six occasions in the Minor Counties Championship from 1911 to 1913, making his debut as an opening order batsman but moving down the order upon several substandard batting performances.

Adams did not play another cricket match until the 1920 season, when he made his County Championship debut at the age of 35 for Northamptonshire, batting extensively throughout the next two seasons, though the team would struggle for decent form in the two years in which he played. Following the close of the 1921 season, Adams spent five years out of the game, returning in an innings victory against Dublin University Cricket Club in 1926.

Adams played regularly in the County Championship during 1927, though Northamptonshire had still made little progress in the league, finishing second bottom. Over the next two years, before making his exit from the game, Adams played just two first-class games, quitting in 1929.

He scored two first-class centuries, with a best of 154 not out against Hampshire.
