= River Ise =

River in Northamptonshire, England

Ise
- The River Ise at Burton Latimer, Northamptonshire.

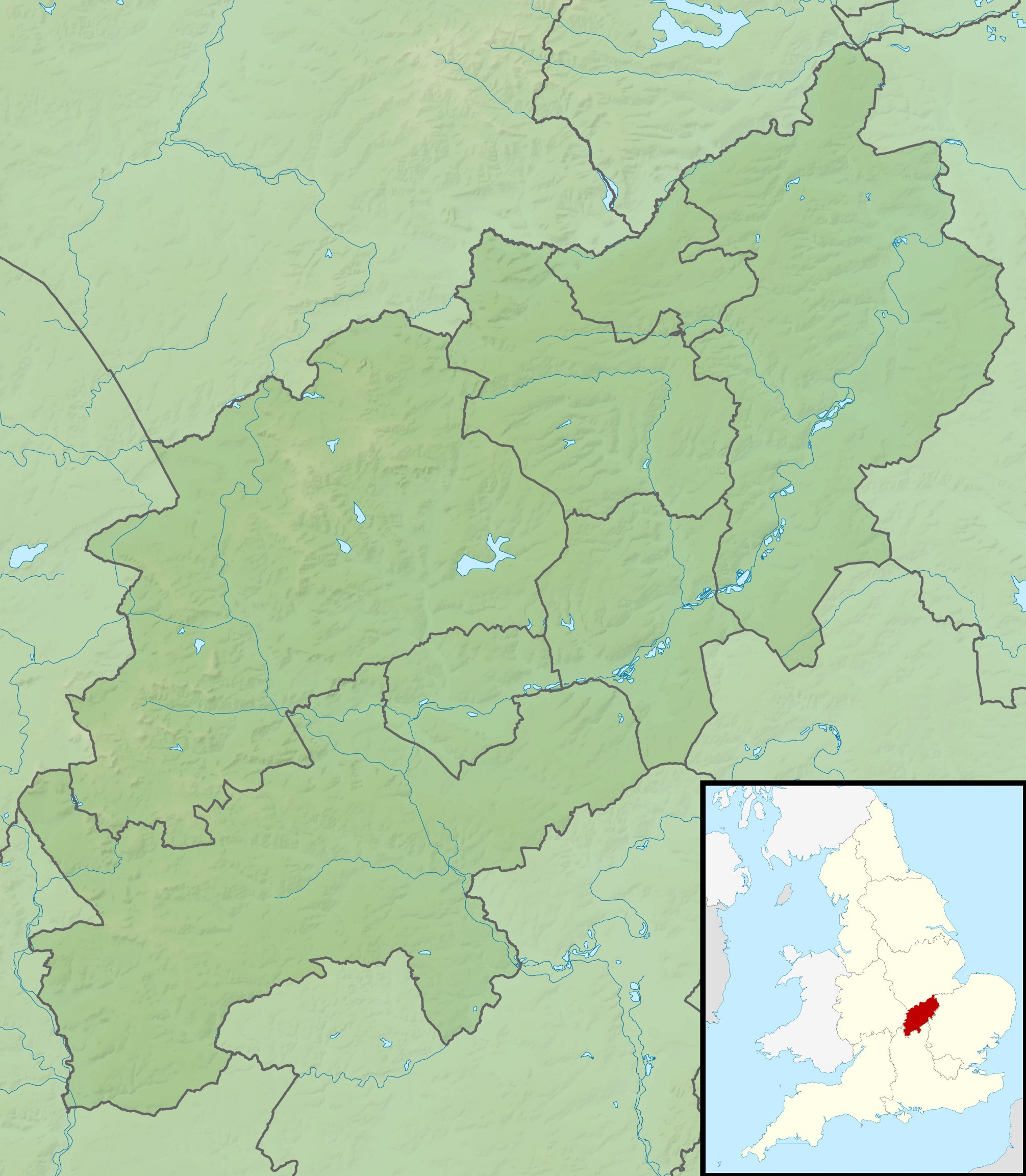
- Location of the mouth within Northamptonshire

Location
- Sovereign State: United Kingdom
- Country: England
- County: Northamptonshire
- Towns: Desborough, Kettering, Burton Latimer, Wellingborough

Physical characteristics
- Source
  - location: Naseby Battlefield
  - coordinates: 52.408895°N 0.992409°W
  - elevation: 167 m (548 ft)
- Mouth: River Nene
  - location: Wellingborough
  - coordinates: 52°17′42″N 0°39′59″W
  - elevation: 40 m (130 ft)
- Length: 51 km (32 mi)
- Basin size: 237 km^{2} (92 sq mi)

Basin features
- River system: River Nene
- Tributaries
  - right: Slade Brook, Pytchley Brook, Hardwick Brook, Harrowden Brook, Swanspool Brook

The River Ise is a river in Northamptonshire, England and a tributary of the River Nene.

The river rises in a field that was part of the site of the Battle of Naseby in north-western Northamptonshire. The parish of Naseby lies across a watershed from which streams also flow to the rivers Avon and Nene. It flows east past Desborough and the Eleanor cross at Geddington, then through the grounds of Rushton Hall, before turning south and passing through the parkland of Boughton House where it was extensively canalised and landscaped in the late 17th century. It then flows between Kettering and Barton Seagrave where its valley was excavated during the creation of Wicksteed Park to provide a large lake for public amenity use. It continues south between Burton Latimer and Isham, the latter of which takes its name from the river. It finishes its journey by flowing past Finedon and joining the Nene just south and east of Wellingborough.

== Fishing on the Ise ==
The Ise contains many varieties of coarse and game fish, including roach, perch, barbel, rudd, common dace and chub. It is also the only watercourse within Northamptonshire to contain grayling (Thymallus thymallus).

== Tributaries ==
The River Ise has various named and unnamed tributaries that join it along its course.

=== Slade Brook ===
The Slade Brook sub-catchment is the largest tributary of the Ise and drains much of the urban area of Kettering, as well as smaller settlements west of the town including Rothwell and Broughton. Two reservoirs were constructed in this system at Cransley and Thorpe Malsor in the 1880s to provide water for local furnaces. Today these artificial lakes are used for recreational fishing and sailing. The Slade Brook joins the Ise just to the south of Wicksteed Park.

=== Swanspool Brook ===
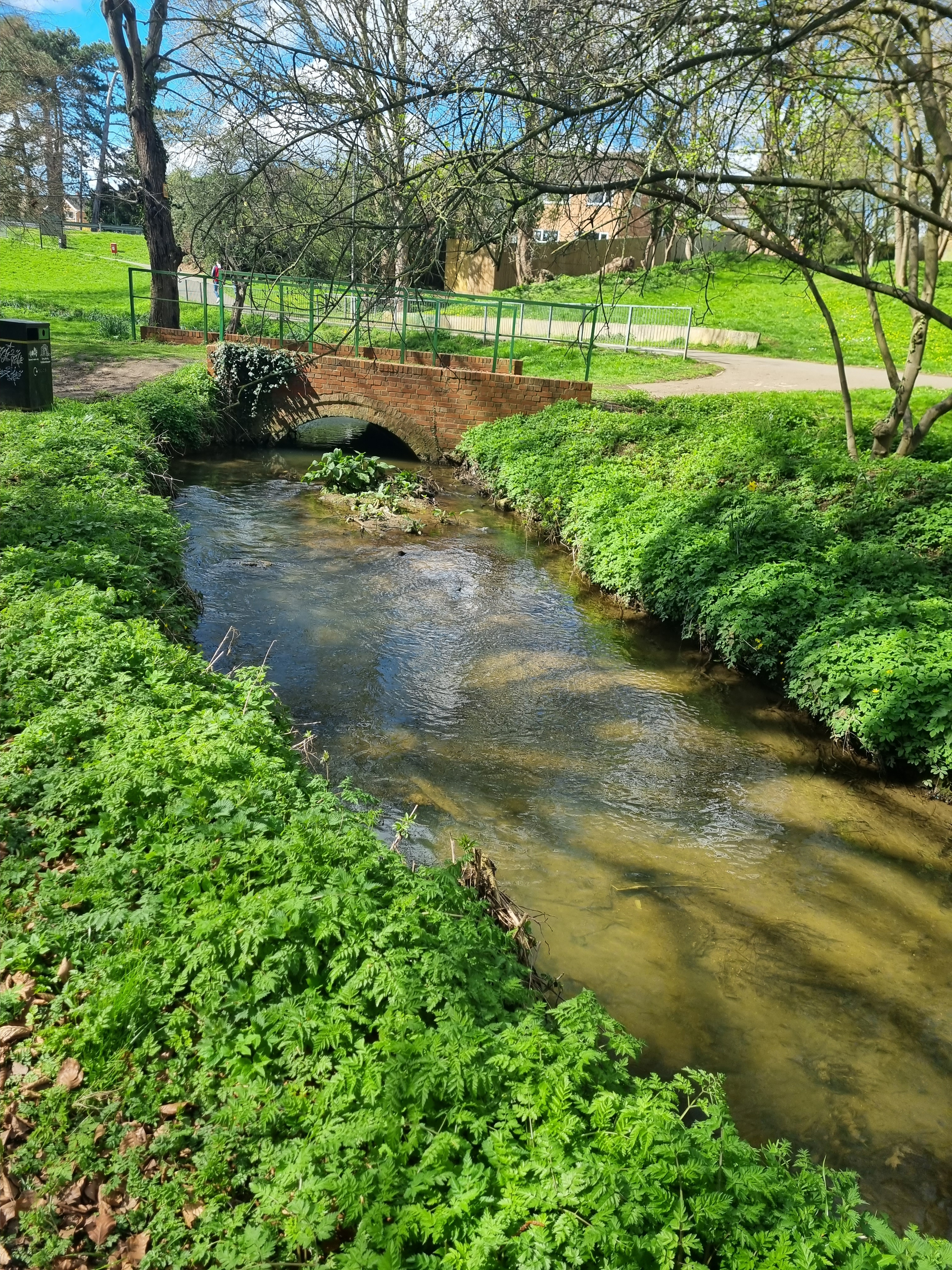
Swanspool Brook in Wellingborough.

The Swanspool Brook rises in woodland to the west of Hardwick and flows through Mears Ashby and Wilby before entering the urban area of Wellingborough, where its shallow valley forms an extensive area of open green space, as well as Swanspool Lake. It meets the Ise close to the confluence with the River Nene.

== Status ==
In 2019, the overall classification of the River Ise under the Water Framework Directive was 'Moderate' for the upper Ise, and 'Poor' for the lower Ise. In both the upper and lower Ise, the predominant factor preventing the rivers from achieving "Good" status under the framework is high levels of phosphate, derived from poor nutrient and livestock management in the surrounding agricultural land and continuous discharge of treated sewage effluent.
