= John Bridges (topographer) =

English lawyer, antiquarian and topographer

John Bridges FSA (1666–1724) was an English lawyer, antiquarian and topographer.

== Life ==
Bridges was born at Barton Seagrave, Northamptonshire, where his father then resided. His grandfather was Colonel John Bridges of Alcester, Warwickshire, whose eldest son of the same name purchased the manor of Barton Seagrave about 1665, and as an improving landowner introduced the cultivation of sainfoin. His mother was Elizabeth, sister of Sir William Trumball, secretary of state. His brother was the painter and missionary Charles Bridges. He was bred to the law, became a bencher of Lincoln's Inn, was appointed solicitor to the customs in 1695, a commissioner in 1711, and cashier of excise in 1715.

He was elected a Fellow of the Royal Society in 1708. He was also a governor of the Bridewell and Bethlehem Hospital. He died at his chambers in Lincoln's Inn on 16 March 1724.

Bridges's collection of books and prints was sold by auction. The sale of the entire library of over 4,000 books and manuscripts started on 7 February 1726; his collection of prints was sold on 24 March 1726. Both auctions, held at his chambers in Lincoln's Inn, were handled by Christopher Cock.

A portrait of Bridges, painted by Sir Godfrey Kneller in 1706, was engraved by George Vertue in 1726.

== Antiquarian work ==
In 1718 he was elected a Fellow of the Society of Antiquaries, and in the following year he began the formation of voluminous manuscript collections for the history of Northamptonshire. He made a circuit of the county, and employed several persons to make drawings, collect information, and transcribe monuments and records. In this manner he expended several thousand pounds. It was his intention to make another personal survey of the county, but before he could carry this design into effect he fell ill and died.

Bridges's manuscripts fill thirty folio volumes, with five quarto volumes of descriptions of churches collected for him and four similar volumes in his own handwriting. These went to the Bodleian Library at Oxford. Left by Bridges as an heirloom to his family, they were placed by his brother William, secretary of the stamp office, in the hands of Gibbons, a stationer and law-bookseller at the Middle Temple Gate, who circulated proposals for their publication by subscription, and engaged Samuel Jebb to edit them. Before many numbers had appeared Gibbons became bankrupt, and the manuscripts remaining in the hands of the editor, who had received no compensation for his labours, were at length secured by William Cartwright, M.P., of Aynho, for his native county, and a local committee was formed to accomplish the publication of the work. This was entrusted to the Rev. Peter Whalley, a master at Christ's Hospital. The first volume appeared in 1762, and the first part of the second in 1769; but delay arose after the death of Sir Thomas Cave, chairman of the committee, and the entire work was not published till 1791. Whalley's part in the work was slight, and he claimed to have added little of his own, except what he compiled from Anthony Wood and William Dugdale. Robert Nares wrote the preface, and Samuel Ayscough compiled the index.

A copy of the work is preserved among the manuscript collections of the British Library (Add MSS 32118-32122), illustrated with sketches, engravings, and additions in print and manuscript. It was bequeathed by William Dash to the British Museum, where it was deposited in 1883, and subsequently became part of the British Library collections.

== Bibliography ==
- Brown, Tony; Foard, Glenn (1994). The Making of a County History: John Bridges' Northamptonshire. Leicester: University of Leicester; Northamptonshire County Council. ISBN 0-947590-20-X.
- Brown, A. E. (2004). "Bridges, John (bap. 1666, d. 1724)". Oxford Dictionary of National Biography (online ed.). Oxford University Press. doi:10.1093/ref:odnb/3395. (Subscription, Wikipedia Library access or UK public library membership required.)
- Cooper, Thompson (1885–1900). "Bridges, John (1666-1724)" . Dictionary of National Biography. London: Smith, Elder & Co.
- Hutchinson, John (1902). "Bridges, John" . A catalogue of notable Middle Templars, with brief biographical notices (1 ed.). Canterbury: the Honourable Society of the Middle Temple. pp. 30–31.
