= St Peter's Church, Raunds =

St Peter’s Church, Raunds
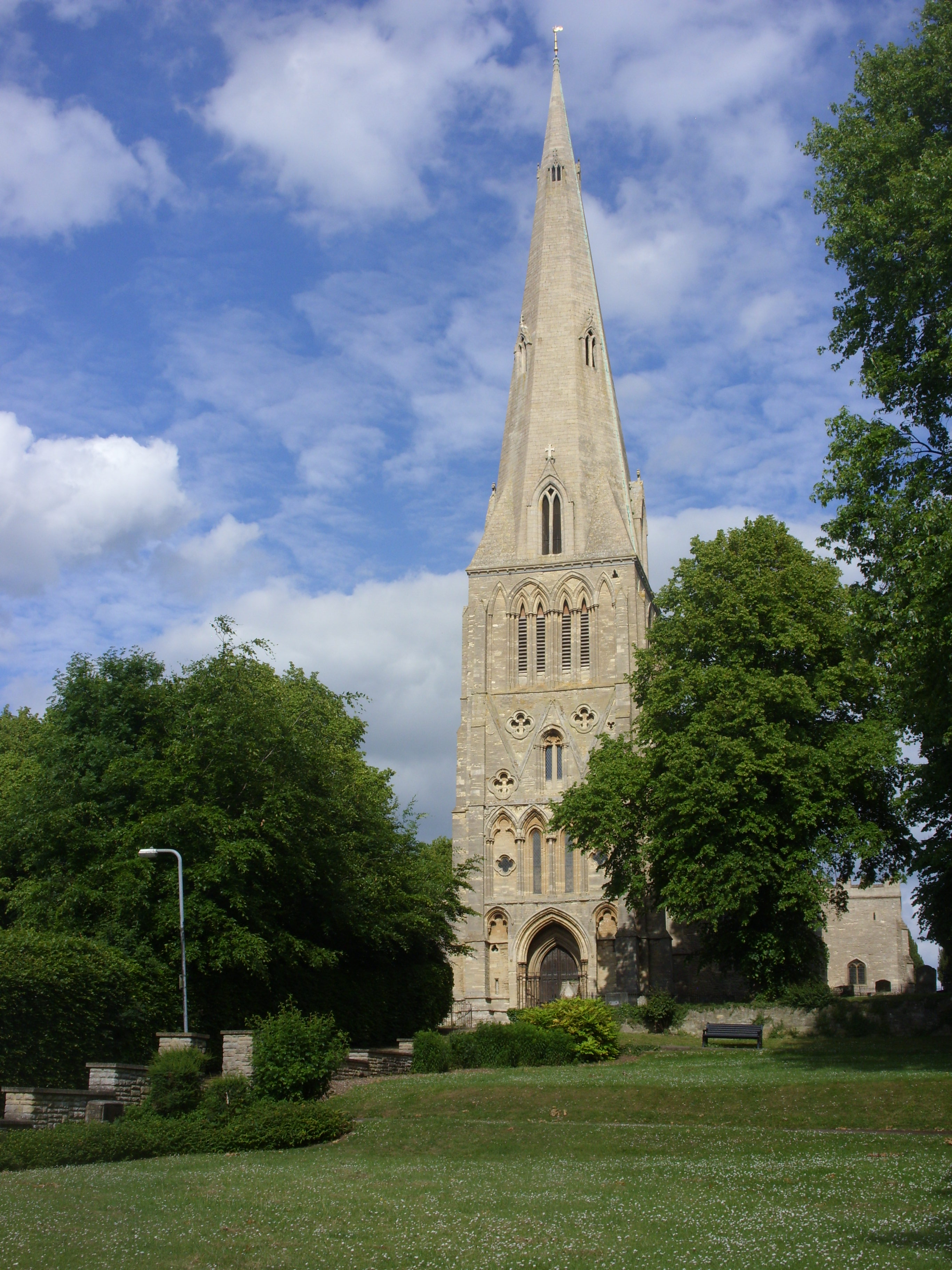
- St Peter’s Church, Raunds
- 52°20′48″N 0°31′59″W
- Location: Raunds, Northamptonshire, England
- Denomination: Church of England
- Previous denomination: Catholic Church
- Website: http://4spires.org/

History
- Former name(s): St Mary’s Church, Raunds
- Dedication: Saint Peter

Administration
- Province: Canterbury
- Diocese: Diocese of Peterborough
- Archdeaconry: Archdeaconry of Oakham
- Deanery: Higham
- Benefice: 4 Spires

Clergy
- Rector: Rev Shena Bell

St Peter's Church is the ancient parish church of the market town of Raunds in Northamptonshire, England. Noted for its exceptional wall paintings and its splendid tower and spire, St Peter’s is a Grade I listed building and stands in an elevated position in Church Street.

== History ==
The present building is thought to be on the site of an earlier place of worship but the majority of the existing structure was erected between the 12th and 14th centuries.

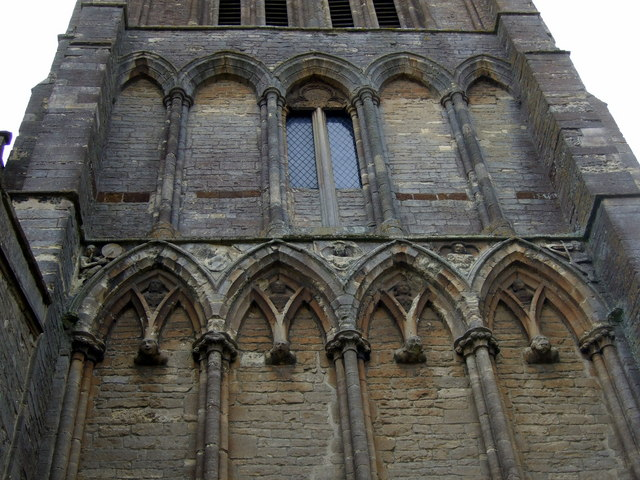
Stone carvings on Raunds church tower

The bowl of the 13th-century circular font is decorated with a carving of a ram's head. A brass on the floor commemorates John Tawyer (died 1470) and his wife Margaret. There is a tomb-chest dedicated to John Wales, vicar from 1447 to 1496. In the south chapel are monuments to Robert Gage (died 1606) and William Gage of Magilligan, Ireland (died 1632). A number of other substantial monuments and also medieval wall paintings survive within the building. The church features a rare 'left-handed fiddler' decoration above the western entrance.

Until the 15th century the dedication of the church was to St Mary but the dedication now used is to St Peter.

The interior was restored in 1874 and 1878 by Sir Gilbert Scott; this involved the removal of a west gallery and alterations to the chancel.

The three-manual organ was built by Peter Conacher and was one of the largest organs by Conacher of Huddersfield. It was donated in 1893 by John King–Smith, a prominent boot manufacturer in Raunds and was most recently restored in 2006.

In 2007, Raunds, Hargrave, Ringstead and Stanwick were legally united as "The 4 Spires Benefice", with each village retaining its own church.

== Architecture ==
The building is axially orientated towards the chancel and Rood Screen and consists of a nave, two aisles, a south aisle chapel, a south porch, and an imposing west tower and spire, the walls being constructed of limestone with ashlar dressings. Though claimed to be 202 feet high, the spire height, according to a 2011 survey by architect Julian Flannery, is actually 176 feet (54 metres) high.

The large central nave is divided from the north and south aisles by a double set of 6 bayed arcades which are surmounted by a double set of 7 clerestories. At either end of the nave are large chamfered triumphal arches one at the east, where the Rood Screen meets the chancel, and the other at the west, giving access to vaulted lower tower chamber and surmounted by the early decorated mechanical clock.

The north aisle is lit by 6 impressive traceried gothic windows which are mirrored by 5 in the south aisle. The south aisle chapel is lit by two south facing windows and one east facing over the altar. The chancel is triple bayed, divided from the south aisle chapel by an arcade of two bays and closed to the north by a wall with three windows. The exterior of the building, especially the tower, is characterised by high English gothic decoration. The interior is richly decorated with surviving 14th and 15th century wall paintings, and carved wood. There is also a good collection of stained glass, mostly post reformation.

== The Raunds Mechanical Clock ==
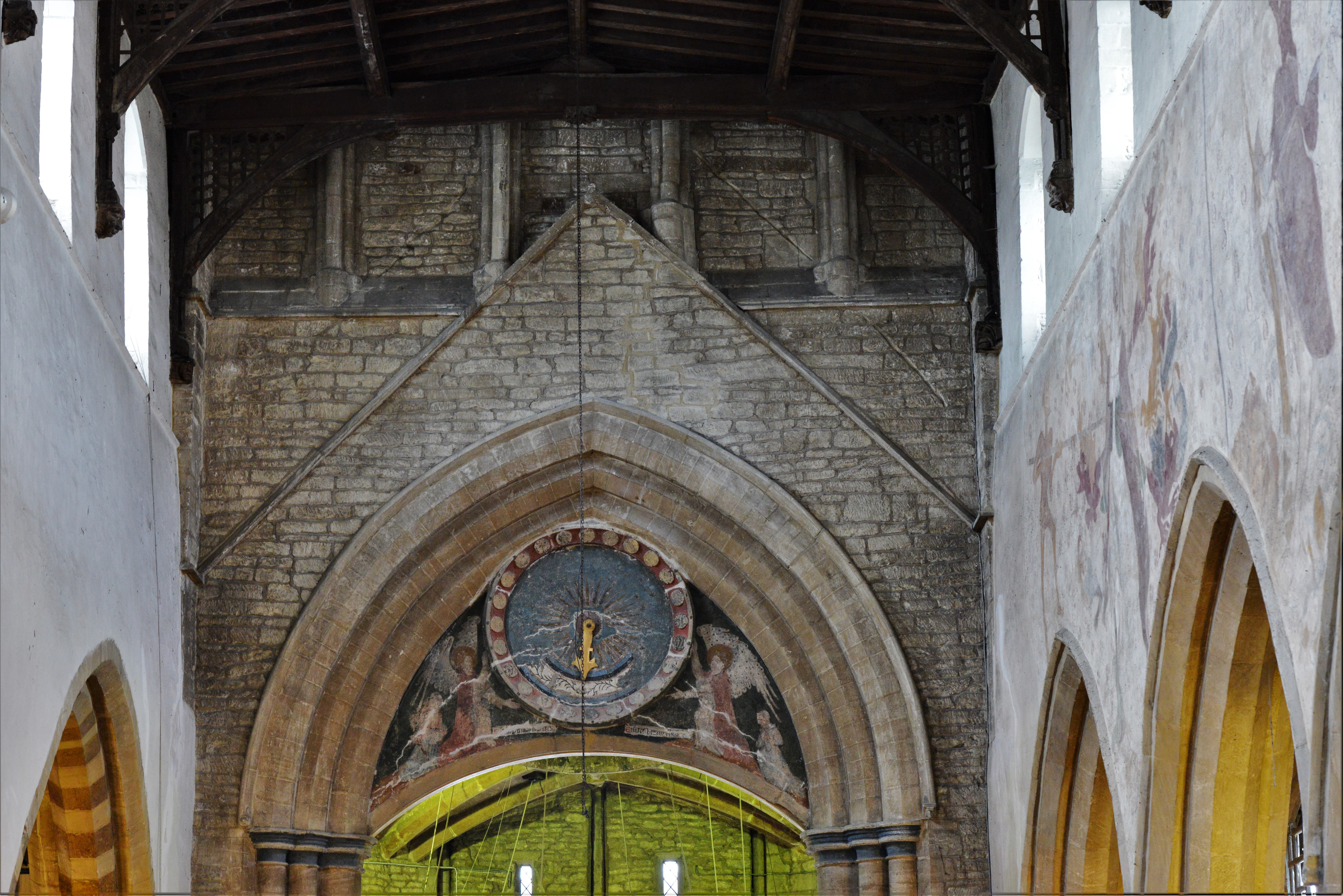
The Raunds Clock and the west towers painted tympanum

St Peter’s is home to the Raunds Clock, a rare 15th century (c. 1420) decorated mechanical clock, located under the tower arch in a tympanum. The painted clockface follows the 24 hour reckoning rather than the earlier medieval day and is one handed. The tympanum is decorated with two painted angels seemingly holding the clock face up, the donors kneeling behind the angels. Latin text asks for prayers to be said for John and Sarah Catlyn.

== The Raunds Wall Paintings ==
St Peter’s is also home to the Raunds Wall Paintings, a set of remarkable surviving late medieval wall paintings (15th cent), which dominate the northern wall of the nave and show through in patches in north aisle. They depict, above the northern nave arcades the Seven Deadly Sins, the Three Quick and Three Dead, and Saint Christopher carrying the Christ Child. The triumphal arch behind where there Rood Loft once stood is decorated with angels encircling the missing Great Rood and monograms of the Most Holy Name. These paintings were all restored in the early 1960s by Eve Baker. The north aisle is home to a once very complete set depicting the life of Saint Catherine of Alexandria. Discovered earlier it was not sensitively restored and so has worn away in large part.

The Raunds Wall Paintings
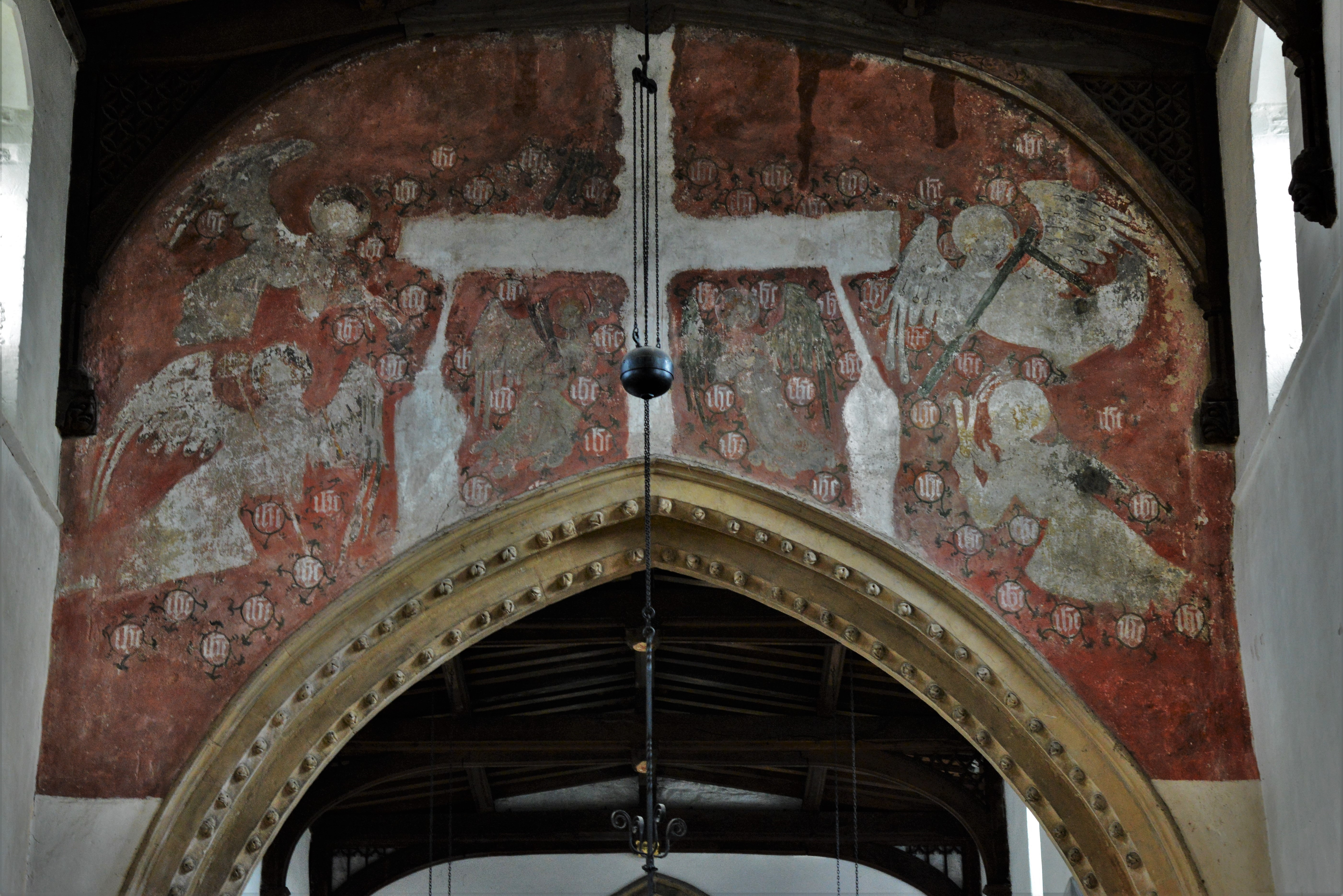
The Rood Loft Mural, the presence of the missing Great Rood is clearly marked

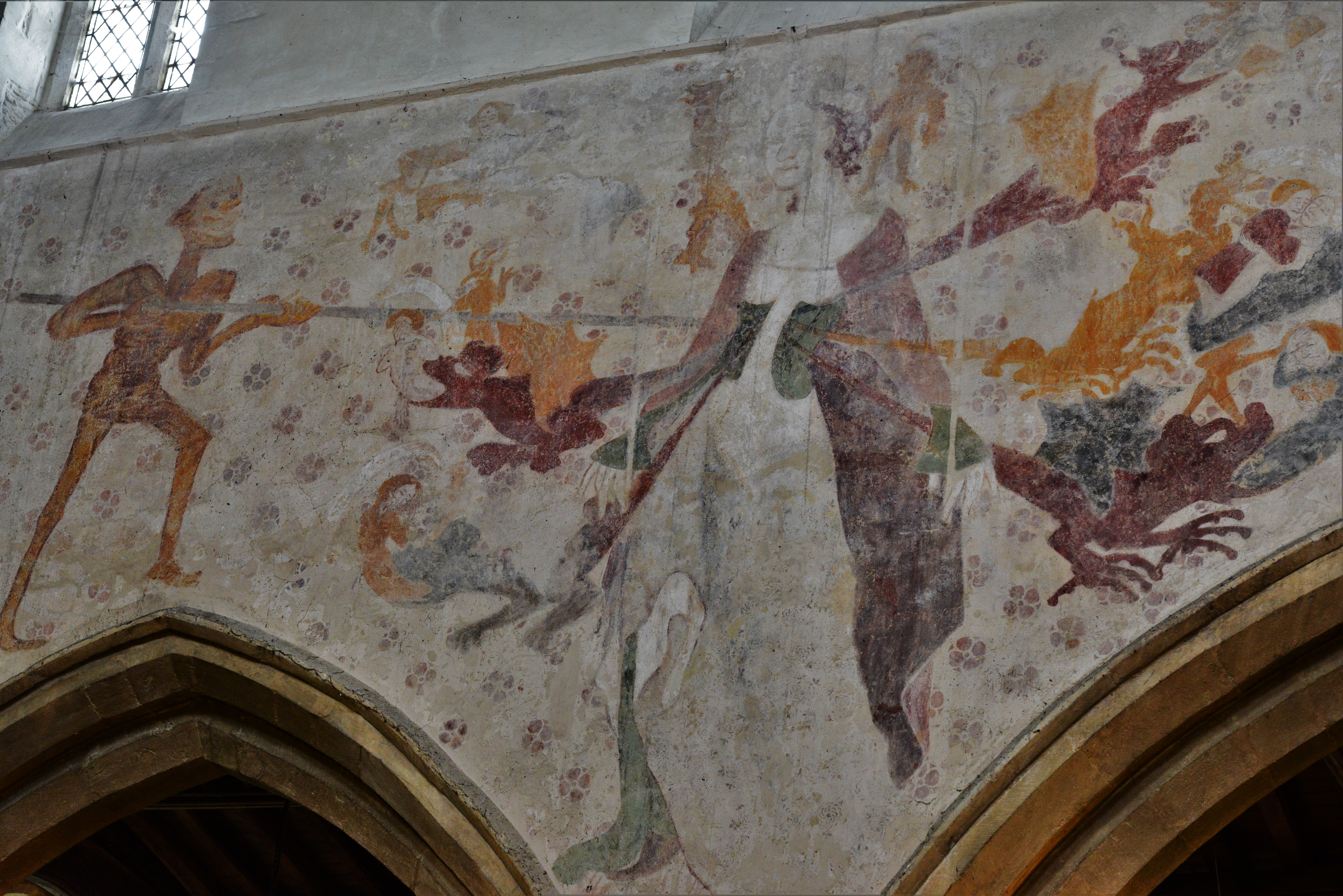
Allegory of The Seven Deadly Sins

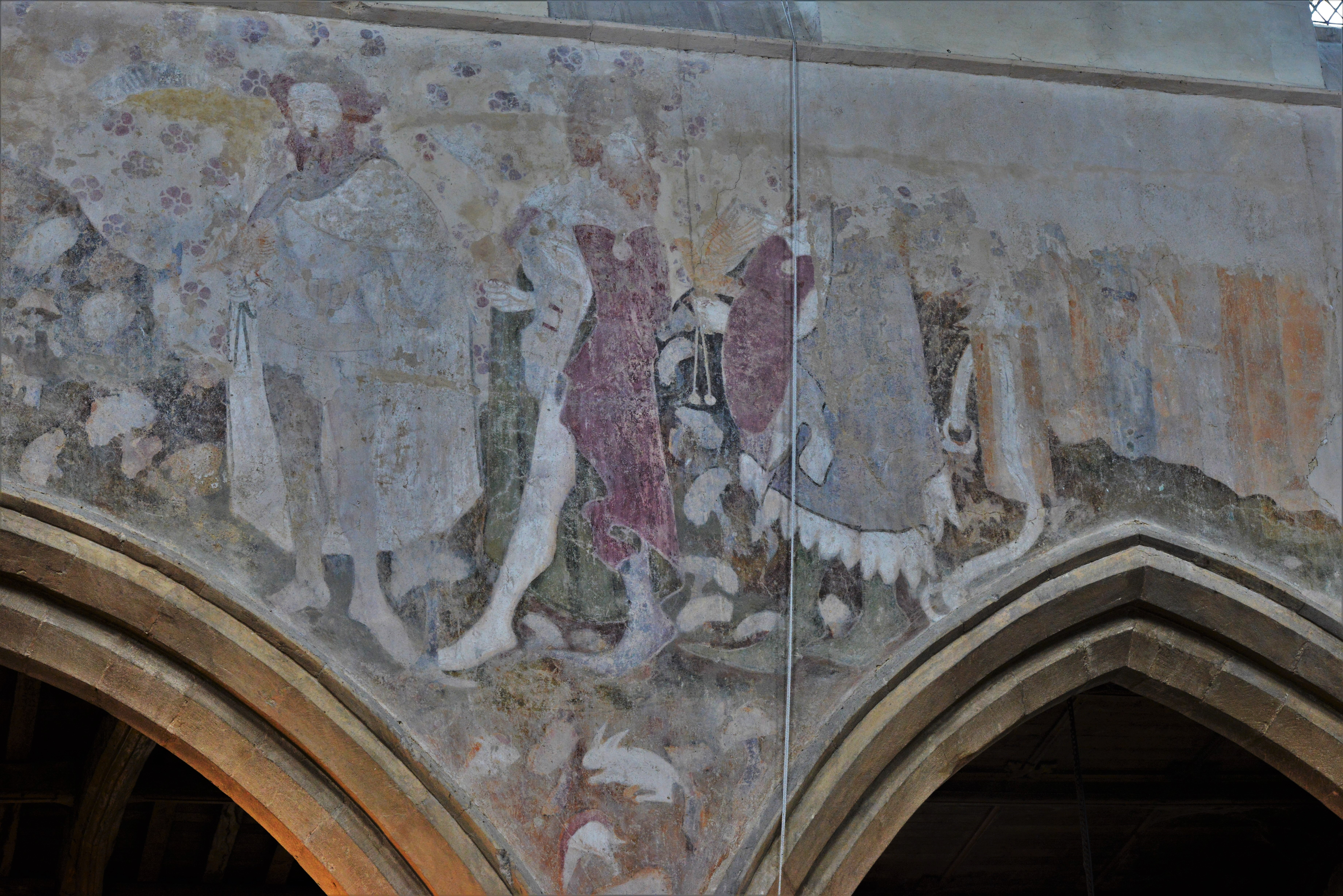
The Three Quick

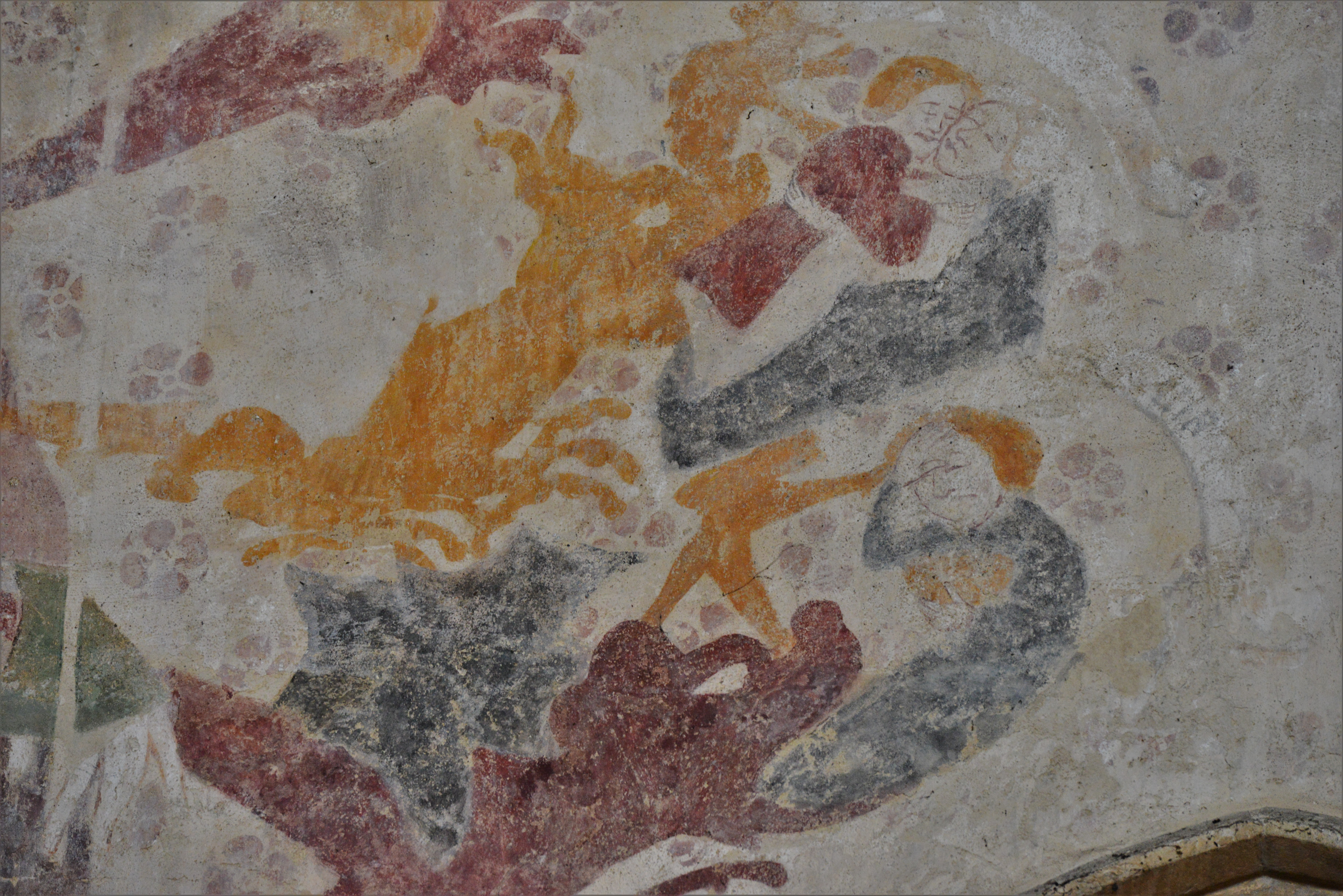
Close up of the allegory of Lust

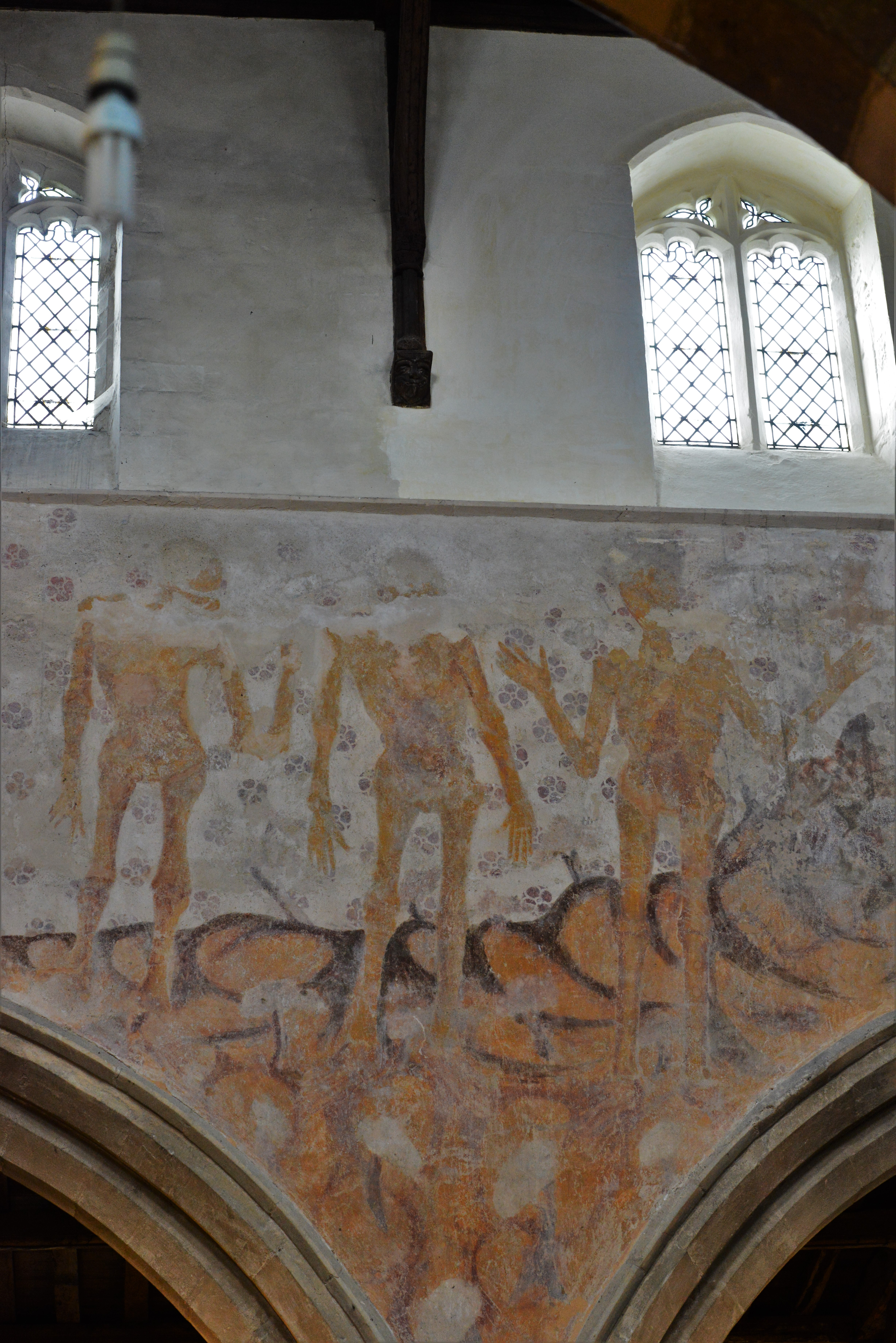
The Three Dead

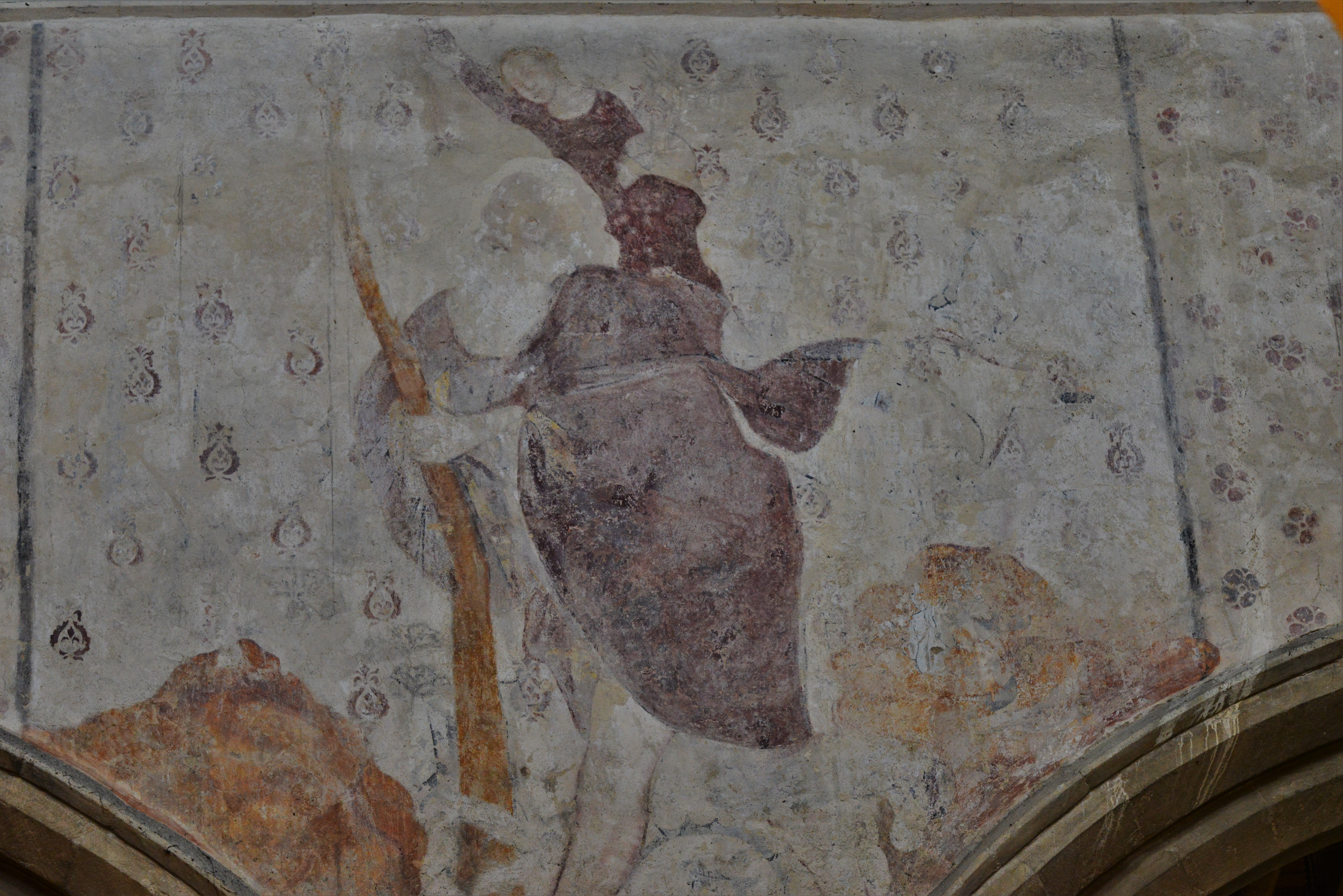
Saint Christopher carrying the Child Jesus

== See also ==
- Grade I listed buildings in Northamptonshire
- The Pickering Wall Paintings
- The Slapton Wall Paintings
