= List of boundary changes in the East Midlands =

Map of the East Midlands region as defined by the UK Government

This is a list of boundary changes occurring in the East Midlands region of England, since the re-organisation of local government following the passing of the Local Government Act 1972.

== Administrative boundaries ==
=== Initial creation ===
When the Local Government Act 1972 was passed there were still some details left to be decided, the Local Government Boundary Commission for England's first work was to clarify these details.

Date	Statutory Instrument	LGBCE Report
1 February 1973	The English Non-Metropolitan Districts (Definition) Order 1972	Report No. 001: Recommendations for new Districts in the non-Metropolitan Counties November 1972
1 May 1973	The English Non-Metropolitan Districts (Names) Order 1973	Report No. 002: Names of Non-Metropolitan Districts March 1973

=== Principal Area Boundary Reviews ===
The Local Government Boundary Commission for England (or LGBCE) was established by the Local Government Act 1972 to review the administrative boundaries of every local authority in England. Between 1974 and 1992 they completed a series of Principal Area Boundary Reviews; reviewing the administrative boundaries of local authorities at their request.

Date	Statutory Instrument	Effect	LGBCE Report(s)
1 April 1982	The Lincoln and North Kesteven (Areas) Order 1982	Changes to the Lincoln/North Kesteven (both Lincolnshire) boundary	Report No. 412: Lincoln/North Kesteven April 1981
1 April 1984	The North Kesteven and West Lindsey (Areas) Order 1983	Changes to the North Kesteven/West Lindsey (both Lincolnshire) boundary	Report No. 435: North Kesteven/West Lindsey November 1982
1 April 1985	The Derbyshire and Nottinghamshire (Areas) Order 1985	Changes to the: Broxtowe (Nottinghamshire)/Erewash (Derbyshire) boundary; Amber Valley/Erewash (both Derbyshire) boundary	Report No. 439: Erewash/Amber Valley/Broxtowe February 1983
1 April 1986	The Derbyshire (District Boundaries) Order 1985	Changes to the Bolsover/North East Derbyshire (both Derbyshire) boundary	Report No. 490: North East Derbyshire/Bolsover January 1985
1 April 1986	The Leicestershire and Nottinghamshire (County and District Boundaries) Order 1985	Changes to the: Charnwood (Leicestershire)/Rushcliffe (Nottinghamshire) boundary; Melton (Leicestershire)/Rushcliffe (Nottinghamshire) boundary; North West Leicestershire (Leicestershire)/Rushcliffe (Nottinghamshire) boundary; Rushcliffe/Nottingham (both Nottinghamshire) boundary; Rushcliffe/Newark (both Nottinghamshire) boundary; North West Leicestershire/Hinckley and Bosworth (both Leicestershire) boundary	Report No. 466: Rushcliffe/Newark/Nottingham/Charnwood/Melton/North West Leicestershire February 1984; Report No. 471: North West Leicestershire/Hinckley and Bosworth July 1984
1 April 1987	The Nottinghamshire (District Boundaries) Order 1987	Changes to the Gedling/Newark (both Nottinghamshire) boundary	Report No. 510: Gedling/Newark and Sherwood November 1985
1 April 1988	The Leicestershire (District Boundaries) Order 1987	Changes to the: Blaby/Leicester (both Leicestershire) boundary; Blaby/Oadby and Wigston (both Leicestershire) boundary	Report No. 532: Blaby/Leicester/Oadby and Wigston January 1987
1 April 1988	The Derbyshire (District Boundaries) Order 1988	Changes to the Chesterfield/North East Derbyshire (both Derbyshire) boundary	Report No. 517: Chesterfield/North East Derbyshire November 1986
1 April 1988	The Nottinghamshire (District Boundaries) Order 1988	Changes to the Ashfield/Gedling (both Nottinghamshire) boundary	Report No. 526: Ashfield/Gedling January 1987

Other principal area boundary reviews

- Report No. 431: Charnwood/North West Leicestershire August 1982
- Report No. 509: Hinckley and Bosworth/Blaby November 1985

=== Mandatory Reviews of non-Metropolitan Counties, Metropolitan Districts and London Boroughs ===
In 1985 they began the first full administrative review of all non-metropolitan counties. Their reviews of metropolitan counties and Greater London began in 1987 and both reviews were completed in 1992.

Date	Statutory Instrument	Effect	LGBCE Report(s)
1 April 1988	The Northamptonshire and Oxfordshire (County Boundaries) Order 1988	Changes to the South Northamptonshire (Northamptonshire)/Cherwell (Oxfordshire) boundary	Report No. 538: Oxfordshire July 1987
1 April 1988	The Northamptonshire and Warwickshire (County Boundaries) Order 1988	Changes to the Daventry (Northamptonshire)/Rugby (Warwickshire) boundary	Report No. 539: Northamptonshire August 1987
1 April 1989	The Cambridgeshire, Essex, Hertfordshire and Lincolnshire (County Boundaries) Order 1989	Changes to the: Uttlesford (Essex)/South Cambridgeshire (Cambridgeshire) boundary; South Cambridgeshire (Cambridgeshire)/North Hertfordshire (Hertfordshire) boundary; Peterborough (Cambridgeshire)/South Holland (Lincolnshire) boundary; Fenland (Cambridgeshire)/South Holland (Lincolnshire) boundary; Peterborough (Cambridgeshire)/South Kesteven (Lincolnshire) boundary	Report No. 546: Cambridgeshire March 1988
1 April 1989	The Lincolnshire and Nottinghamshire (County Boundaries) Order 1989	Changes to the: North Kesteven (Lincolnshire)/Newark (Nottinghamshire) boundary; West Lindsey (Lincolnshire)/Newark (Nottinghamshire) boundary	Report No. 540: Lincolnshire November 1987
1 April 1991	The Buckinghamshire, Hertfordshire, Northamptonshire and Oxfordshire (County Boundaries) Order 1991	Changes to the: South Northamptonshire (Northamptonshire)/Milton Keynes (Buckinghamshire) boundary; Dacorum (Hertfordshire)/Chiltern (Buckinghamshire) boundary; Wycombe (Buckinghamshire)/South Oxfordshire (Oxfordshire) boundary; South Northamptonshire (Northamptonshire)/Aylesbury Vale (Buckinghamshire) boundary; Dacorum (Hertfordshire)/Aylesbury Vale (Buckinghamshire) boundary; Three Rivers (Hertfordshire)/Chiltern (Buckinghamshire) boundary	Report No. 571: Buckinghamshire May 1989
1 April 1991	The Cheshire, Derbyshire, Hereford and Worcester and Staffordshire (County Boundaries) Order 1991	Changes to the: Congleton (Cheshire)/Newcastle-under-Lyme (Staffordshire) boundary; Wyre Forest (Hereford and Worcester)/South Staffordshire (Staffordshire) boundary; High Peak (Derbyshire)/Staffordshire Moorlands (Staffordshire) boundary; Derbyshire Dales (Derbyshire)/Staffordshire Moorlands (Staffordshire) boundary; Derbyshire Dales (Derbyshire)/East Staffordshire (Staffordshire) boundary; South Derbyshire (Derbyshire)/East Staffordshire (Staffordshire) boundary; South Derbyshire (Derbyshire)/South Staffordshire (Staffordshire) boundary; South Derbyshire (Derbyshire)/Lichfield (Staffordshire) boundary	Report No. 582: Staffordshire February 1990
1 April 1992	The Derbyshire and Greater Manchester (County Boundaries) Order 1991	Changes to the High Peak (Derbyshire)/Tameside (Greater Manchester) boundary	Report No. 590: Tameside August 1990
1 April 1991	The Derbyshire, Leicestershire, Lincolnshire, Nottinghamshire and Warwickshire (County Boundaries) Order 1991	Changes to the: North Warwickshire (Warwickshire)/Hinckley and Bosworth (Leicestershire); South Derbyshire (Derbyshire)/North West Leicestershire (Leicestershire); North West Leicestershire (Leicestershire)/Rushcliffe (Nottinghamshire); South Kesteven (Lincolnshire)/Rutland (Leicestershire) boundary	Report No. 577: Leicestershire October 1989
1 April 1991	The North Yorkshire, South Yorkshire and Nottinghamshire (County Boundaries) Order 1991	Changes to the: Selby (North Yorkshire)/Doncaster (South Yorkshire) boundary; Doncaster (South Yorkshire)/Bassetlaw (Nottinghamshire) boundary	Report No. 585: Doncaster March 1990
1 April 1992	The Cheshire, Derbyshire, Hereford and Worcester and Staffordshire (County Boundaries) (Variation) Order 1992	n/a	n/a
1 April 1993	The Derbyshire and Nottinghamshire (County Boundaries) Order 1992	Changes to the: Amber Valley (Derbyshire)/Broxtowe (Nottinghamshire) boundary; Amber Valley (Derbyshire)/Ashfield (Nottinghamshire) boundary; Bolsover (Derbyshire)/Bassetlaw (Nottinghamshire) boundary; Erewash (Derbyshire)/Broxtowe (Nottinghamshire) boundary; Bolsover (Derbyshire)/Ashfield (Nottinghamshire) boundary; Bolsover (Derbyshire)/Mansfield (Nottinghamshire) boundary	Report No. 599: Derbyshire February 1991
1 April 1994	The Cheshire, Derbyshire and Greater Manchester (County and District Boundaries) Order 1993	Changes to the: Macclesfield (Cheshire)/Stockport (Greater Manchester) boundary; High Peak (Derbyshire)/Stockport (Greater Manchester) boundary; Stockport/Tameside (both Greater Manchester) boundary	Report No. 616: Stockport November 1991
1 April 1994	The Derbyshire and Nottinghamshire (County Boundaries) Order 1993	Changes to the Bassetlaw (Nottinghamshire)/Bolsover (Derbyshire) boundary	Report No. 674: Nottinghamshire (Further Review) September 1992
1 April 1994	The Derbyshire and South Yorkshire (County and District Boundaries) Order 1993	Changes to the: North East Derbyshire (Derbyshire)/Sheffield (South Yorkshire) boundary; Barnsley/Sheffield (both South Yorkshire) boundary	Report No. 614: Sheffield September 1991
1 April 1994	The Derbyshire, Nottinghamshire and South Yorkshire (County and District Boundaries) Order 1993	Changes to the: Bolsover (Derbyshire)/Rotherham (South Yorkshire) boundary; North East Derbyshire (Derbyshire)/Rotherham (South Yorkshire) boundary; Bassetlaw (Nottinghamshire)/Rotherham (South Yorkshire) boundary; Doncaster/Rotherham (both South Yorkshire) boundary; Rotherham/Sheffield (both South Yorkshire) boundary	Report No. 670: Rotherham August 1992

Other mandatory meviews of non-metropolitan counties, metropolitan districts and London boroughs

- Report No. 562: Cheshire August 1988
- Report No. 563: Humberside September 1988
- Report No. 601: Barnsley February 1991
- Report No. 609: Nottinghamshire November 1991

== Electoral boundaries ==
=== Initial creation ===
When the Local Government Act 1972 was passed there was not sufficient time to draw up proper electoral boundaries for the new county and district councils, so a temporary system was quickly put in place, intended to only be used for the first elections in 1973.

Date	Statutory Instrument
7 June 1973	The County of Derbyshire (District Wards) Order 1973
12 April 1973	The County of Derbyshire (Electoral Divisions) Order 1973
7 June 1973	The County of Leicestershire (District Wards) Order 1973
12 April 1973	The County of Leicestershire (Electoral Divisions) Order 1973
7 June 1973	The County of Lincolnshire (District Wards) Order 1973
12 April 1973	The County of Lincolnshire (Electoral Divisions) Order 1973
7 June 1973	The County of Northamptonshire (District Wards) Order 1973
12 April 1973	The County of Northamptonshire (Electoral Divisions) Order 1973
7 June 1973	The County of Nottinghamshire (District Wards) Order 1973
12 April 1973	The County of Nottinghamshire (Electoral Divisions) Order 1973

=== First periodic review ===
The Local Government Boundary Commission for England (or LGBCE) was established by the Local Government Act 1972 to review the electoral boundaries of every local authority in England. In 1974 they began the first full electoral review of all metropolitan and non-metropolitan districts, completing it in July 1980. Their reviews of the county councils were completed in 1984.

Date	Statutory Instrument	LGBCE Report
6 May 1976	The Borough of Gedling (Electoral Arrangements) Order 1975	Report No. 071: Gedling October 1975
6 May 1976	The Borough of Rushcliffe (Electoral Arrangements) Order 1975	Report No. 024: Rushcliffe June 1975
6 May 1976	The District of Broxtowe (Electoral Arrangements) Order 1975	Report No. 073: Broxtowe October 1975
6 May 1976	The District of Corby (Electoral Arrangements) Order 1975	Report No. 033: Corby August 1975
3 May 1979	The Borough of Kettering (Electoral Arrangements) Order 1976	Report No. 076: Kettering October 1975
6 May 1976	The City of Nottingham (Electoral Arrangements) Order 1976	Report No. 080: City of Nottingham October 1975
6 May 1976	The District of Ashfield (Electoral Arrangements) Order 1976	Report No. 081: Ashfield October 1975
3 May 1979	The District of Bassetlaw (Electoral Arrangements) Order 1976	Report No. 135: Bassetlaw January 1976
3 May 1979	The District of Daventry (Electoral Arrangements) Order 1976	Report No. 113: Daventry December 1975
3 May 1979	The District of East Northamptonshire (Electoral Arrangements) Order 1976	Report No. 075: East Northamptonshire October 1975
3 May 1979	The District of Mansfield (Electoral Arrangements) Order 1976	Report No. 107: Mansfield November 1975
3 May 1979	The District of Newark (Electoral Arrangements) Order 1976	Report No. 126: Newark January 1976
3 May 1979	The District of South Derbyshire (Electoral Arrangements) Order 1976	Report No. 165: South Derbyshire August 1976
6 May 1976	The District of South Northamptonshire (Electoral Arrangements) Order 1976	Report No. 131: South Northamptonshire January 1976
3 May 1979	The Borough of Boston (Electoral Arrangements) Order 1977	Report No. 169: Boston October 1976
3 May 1979	The Borough of High Peak (Electoral Arrangements) Order 1977	Report No. 206: High Peak May 1977
3 May 1979	The Borough of Melton (Electoral Arrangements) Order 1977	Report No. 177: Melton January 1977
3 May 1979	The Borough of Oadby and Wigston (Electoral Arrangements) Order 1977	Report No. 178: Oadby and Wigston January 1977
3 May 1979	The District of North Kesteven (Electoral Arrangements) Order 1977	Report No. 208: North Kesteven June 1977
3 May 1979	The District of Rutland (Electoral Arrangements) Order 1977	Report No. 199: Rutland May 1977
3 May 1979	The District of West Derbyshire (Electoral Arrangements) Order 1977	Report No. 175: West Derbyshire November 1976
3 May 1979	The Borough of Chesterfield (Electoral Arrangements) Order 1978	Report No. 260: Chesterfield October 1977
3 May 1979	The Borough of Erewash (Electoral Arrangements) Order 1978	Report No. 224: Erewash July 1977
3 May 1979	The Borough of Northampton (Electoral Arrangements) Order 1978	Report No. 290: Northampton September 1978
3 May 1979	The City of Derby (Electoral Arrangements) Order 1978	Report No. 233: Derby February 1977
3 May 1979	The City of Lincoln (Electoral Arrangements) Order 1978	Report No. 292: Lincoln October 1978
3 May 1979	The District of Amber Valley (Electoral Arrangements) Order 1978	Report No. 263: Amber Valley November 1977
3 May 1979	The District of Bolsover (Electoral Arrangements) Order 1978	Report No. 245: Bolsover November 1977
3 May 1979	The District of North East Derbyshire (Electoral Arrangements) Order 1978	Report No. 218: North East Derbyshire June 1977
3 May 1979	The District of South Holland (Electoral Arrangements) Order 1978	Report No. 265: South Holland November 1977
3 May 1979	The District of South Kesteven (Electoral Arrangements) Order 1978	Report No. 197: South Kesteven May 1977
3 May 1979	The District of West Lindsey (Electoral Arrangements) Order 1978	Report No. 268: West Lindsey December 1977
5 May 1983	The Borough of Wellingborough (Electoral Arrangements) Order 1979	Report No. 333: Wellingborough May 1979
5 May 1983	The City of Leicester (Electoral Arrangements) Order 1979	Report No. 335: Leicester May 1979
5 May 1983	The District of East Lindsey (Electoral Arrangements) Order 1979	Report No. 352: East Lindsey September 1979
5 May 1983	The District of Harborough (Electoral Arrangements) Order 1979	Report No. 315: Harborough January 1979
5 May 1983	The Borough of Charnwood (Electoral Arrangements) Order 1980	Report No. 372: Charnwood February 1980
5 May 1983	The Borough of Hinckley and Bosworth (Electoral Arrangements) Order 1980	Report No. 354: Hinckley and Bosworth October 1979
7 May 1981	The County of Derbyshire (Electoral Arrangements) Order 1980	Report No. 398: Derbyshire October 1980
7 May 1981	The County of Lincolnshire (Electoral Arrangements) Order 1980	Report No. 396: Lincolnshire September 1980
7 May 1981	The County of Nottinghamshire (Electoral Arrangements) Order 1980	Report No. 383: Nottinghamshire May 1980
5 May 1983	The District of Blaby (Electoral Arrangements) Order 1980	Report No. 387: Blaby July 1980
5 May 1983	The District of North West Leicestershire (Electoral Arrangements) Order 1980	Report No. 377: North West Leicestershire March 1980
7 May 1981	The County of Northamptonshire (Electoral Arrangements) Order 1981	Report No. 403: Northamptonshire November 1980
2 May 1985	The County of Leicestershire (Electoral Arrangements) Order 1984	Report No. 441: Leicestershire March 1983

=== Further electoral reviews by the LGBCE ===
Local authorities could request a further review if they felt that there were changes in circumstances since the initial review. The LGBCE would only approve this if they felt it was appropriate because of major changes in the size or distribution of the electorate.

Date	Statutory Instrument	LGBCE Report
2 May 1991	The Borough of Oadby and Wigston (Electoral Arrangements) Order 1987	n/a (change in electoral cycle.)

=== Second periodic review ===
The Local Government Act 1992 established the Local Government Commission for England (or LGCE) as the successor to the LGBCE. In 1996 they began the second full electoral review of English local authorities. On 1 April 2002 the Boundary Committee for England (or BCfE) took over the functions of the LGBCE and carried on the review, completing it in 2004.

Date	Statutory Instrument	LGCE/BCfE Report(s)
6 May 1999	The Borough of Boston (Electoral Changes) Order 1998	Draft report October 1996 Final report
6 May 1999	The Borough of Corby (Electoral Changes) Order 1998	Draft report October 1996 Final report 25 March 1997
6 May 1999	The Borough of Kettering (Electoral Changes) Order 1998	Draft report Final report 25 March 1997
6 May 1999	The Borough of Northampton (Electoral Changes) Order 1998	Draft report October 1996 Final report 25 March 1997
6 May 1999	The Borough of Wellingborough (Electoral Changes) Order 1998	Draft report October 1996 Final report 25 March 1997
6 May 1999	The City of Lincoln (Electoral Changes) Order 1998	Draft report October 1996 Final report 25 March 1997
6 May 1999	The District of Daventry (Electoral Changes) Order 1998	Draft report October 1996 Final report 25 March 1997
6 May 1999	The District of East Lindsey (Electoral Changes) Order 1998	Draft report October 1996 Final report 25 March 1997
6 May 1999	The District of East Northamptonshire (Electoral Changes) Order 1998	Draft report October 1996 Final report 25 March 1997
6 May 1999	The District of North Kesteven (Parishes and Electoral Changes) Order 1998	Draft report October 1996 Final report 25 March 1997
6 May 1999	The District of South Holland (Electoral Changes) Order 1998	Draft report October 1996 Final report 25 March 1997
6 May 1999	The District of South Kesteven (Electoral Changes) Order 1998	Draft report October 1996 Final report 25 March 1997
6 May 1999	The District of South Northamptonshire (Electoral Changes) Order 1998	Draft report October 1996 Final report 25 March 1997
6 May 1999	The District of West Lindsey (Electoral Changes) Order 1998	Draft report October 1996 Final report 25 March 1997
4 May 2000	The Borough of Amber Valley (Electoral Changes) Order 1999	Draft report 30 June 1998 Final report 24 November 1998
1 May 2003	The Borough of Chesterfield (Electoral Changes) Order 1999	Draft report 30 June 1998 Final report 24 November 1998
1 May 2003	The Borough of Erewash (Electoral Changes) Order 1999	Draft report 30 June 1998 Final report 24 November 1998
1 May 2003	The Borough of High Peak (Electoral Changes) Order 1999	Draft report 30 June 1998 Final report 24 November 1998
1 May 2003	The District of Bolsover (Electoral Changes) Order 1999	Draft report 30 June 1998 Final report 24 November 1998
1 May 2003	The District of Derbyshire Dales (Electoral Changes) Order 1999	Draft report 30 June 1998 Final report 24 November 1998
1 May 2003	The District of North East Derbyshire (Electoral Changes) Order 1999	Draft report 30 June 1998 Final report 24 November 1998
1 May 2003	The District of South Derbyshire (Electoral Changes) Order 1999	Draft report 30 June 1998 Final report 24 November 1998
1 May 2003	The Borough of Broxtowe (Electoral Changes) Order 2000	Draft report 14 December 1999 Final report 16 May 2000
1 May 2003	The Borough of Gedling (Electoral Changes) Order 2000	Draft report 14 December 1999 Final report 16 May 2000
1 May 2003	The Borough of Rushcliffe (Electoral Changes) Order 2000	Draft report 14 December 1999 Final report 16 May 2000
1 May 2003	The City of Nottingham (Electoral Changes) Order 2000; The City of Nottingham (Electoral Changes) (Amendment) Order 2005	Draft report 14 December 1999 Final report 16 May 2000
7 June 2001	The County of Lincolnshire (Electoral Changes) Order 2000	Draft report 11 May 1999 Final report 2 November 1999
7 June 2001	The County of Northamptonshire (Electoral Changes) Order 2000	Draft report 11 May 1999 Final report 2 November 1999
1 May 2003	The District of Ashfield (Electoral Changes) Order 2000	Draft report 14 December 1999 Final report 16 May 2000
2 May 2002	The District of Bassetlaw (Electoral Changes) Order 2000	Draft report 14 December 1999 Final report 16 May 2000
1 May 2003	The District of Mansfield (Electoral Changes) Order 2000	Draft report 14 December 1999 Final report 16 May 2000
1 May 2003	The District of Newark and Sherwood (Electoral Changes) Order 2000	Draft report 14 December 1999 Final report 16 May 2000
2 May 2002	The City of Derby (Electoral Changes) Order 2001	Draft report 9 January 2001 Final report 26 June 2001
1 May 2003	The Borough of Charnwood (Electoral Changes) Order 2002	Draft report 15 January 2002 Final report 6 June 2002
1 May 2003	The Borough of Hinckley and Bosworth (Electoral Changes) Order 2002	Draft report 15 January 2002 Final report 6 June 2002
1 May 2003	The Borough of Melton (Electoral Changes) Order 2002	Draft report 15 January 2002 Final report 6 June 2002
1 May 2003	The Borough of Oadby and Wigston (Electoral Changes) Order 2002	Draft report 15 January 2002 Final report 6 June 2002
1 May 2003	The City of Leicester (Electoral Changes) Order 2002	Draft report 15 January 2002 Final report 6 June 2002
1 May 2003	The District of Blaby (Electoral Changes) Order 2002	Draft report 15 January 2002 Final report 6 June 2002
1 May 2003	The District of Harborough (Electoral Changes) Order 2002	Draft report 15 January 2002 Final report 6 June 2002
1 May 2003	The District of North West Leicestershire (Electoral Changes) Order 2002	Draft report 15 January 2002 Final report 6 June 2002
1 May 2003	The District of Rutland (Electoral Changes) Order 2003	Draft report 14 May 2002 Final report 15 October 2002
5 May 2005	The County of Derbyshire (Electoral Changes) Order 2004	Draft report 22 February 2000 Final report 22 August 2000
5 May 2005	The County of Nottinghamshire (Electoral Changes) Order 2004	Draft report 28 May 2003 Final report 27 April 2004
5 May 2005	The County of Leicestershire (Electoral Changes) Order 2005	Draft report Final report

=== Further electoral reviews by the BCfE ===
Date	Statutory Instrument	BCfE Report(s)
3 May 2007	The Borough of Corby (Electoral Changes) Order 2006	Draft report May 2005 Final report December 2005
3 May 2007	The Borough of Kettering (Electoral Changes) Order 2006	Draft report June 2005 Final report May 2006
3 May 2007	The City of Lincoln (Electoral Changes) Order 2006	Draft report June 2005 Final report May 2006
3 May 2007	The District of North Kesteven (Electoral Changes) Order 2006	Draft report May 2005 Final report December 2005
3 May 2007	The District of South Northamptonshire (Electoral Changes) Order 2006; The District of South Northamptonshire (Electoral Changes) (Amendment) Order 2007	Draft report May 2005 Final report May 2006
3 May 2007	The District of East Northamptonshire (Electoral Changes) Order 2007	Draft report February 2006 Final report September 2006
3 May 2007	The District of Newark and Sherwood (Electoral Changes) Order 2007; The District of Newark and Sherwood (Electoral Changes) (Amendment) Order 2007	Final report July 2006
3 May 2007	The District of South Holland (Electoral Changes) Order 2007	Draft report November 2005 Final report July 2006

=== Further electoral reviews by the LGBCE ===
The Local Government Boundary Commission for England (or LGBCE) was established by the Local Democracy, Economic Development and Construction Act 2009 on 1 April 2010 as the successor to the BCfE. It continues to review the electoral arrangements of English local authorities on an ‘as and when’ basis.

Date	Statutory Instrument	LGBCE Report(s)
5 May 2011	The Mansfield (Electoral Changes) Order 2011	Final report March 2010
5 May 2011	The Northampton (Electoral Changes) Order 2011	Final report October 2010
5 May 2011	The South Derbyshire (Electoral Changes) Order 2011	Final report October 2010
3 May 2012	The Daventry (Electoral Changes) Order 2012	Final report September 2011
2 May 2013	The Derbyshire (Electoral Changes) Order 2012	Final report August 2012
7 May 2015	The West Lindsey (Electoral Changes) Order 2012	Final report September 2011
7 May 2015	The Boston (Electoral Changes) Order 2013	Final report October 2012
2 May 2013	The Northamptonshire (Electoral Changes) Order 2013	Final report October 2012
7 May 2015	The Rushcliffe (Electoral Changes) Order 2013	Final report February 2013
7 May 2015	The Bolsover (Electoral Changes) Order 2014	Final report October 2012
7 May 2015	The Corby (Electoral Changes) Order 2014	Final report July 2014
7 May 2015	The East Lindsey (Electoral Changes) Order 2014	Final report November 2013
7 May 2015	The Gedling (Electoral Changes) Order 2014	Final report March 2013
7 May 2015	The Leicester (Electoral Changes) Order 2014	Final report August 2014
7 May 2015	The Newark & Sherwood (Electoral Changes) Order 2014	Final report March 2014
7 May 2015	The North West Leicestershire (Electoral Changes) Order 2014	Final report February 2014
7 May 2015	The South Kesteven (Electoral Changes) Order 2014	Final report March 2014
7 May 2015	The Wellingborough (Electoral Changes) Order 2014	Final report February 2014
7 May 2015	The Ashfield (Electoral Changes) Order 2015	Final report November 2014
7 May 2015	The Broxtowe (Electoral Changes) Order 2015	Final report October 2014
7 May 2015	The Erewash (Electoral Changes) Order 2015	Final report July 2014
7 May 2015	The High Peak (Electoral Changes) Order 2015	Final report January 2015
5 May 2016	The Lincoln (Electoral Changes) Order 2015	Final report February 2015
4 May 2017	The Nottinghamshire (Electoral Changes) Order 2016	Final report November 2015
4 May 2017	The Leicestershire (Electoral Changes) Order 2016	Final report April 2016
2 May 2019	The Harborough (Electoral Changes) Order 2017	Final report July 2017
2 May 2019	The Bolsover (Electoral Changes) Order 2017	Final report August 2017
2 May 2019	The North East Derbyshire (Electoral Changes) Order 2017	Final report August 2017
2 May 2019	The Nottingham (Electoral Changes) Order 2018	Final report April 2018
2 May 2019	The Rutland (Electoral Changes) Order 2018	Final report April 2018
4 May 2023	The North Kesteven (Electoral Changes) Order 2021	Final report January 2021
4 May 2023	The Derbyshire Dales (Electoral Changes) Order 2022	Final report June 2021
4 May 2023	The Mansfield (Electoral Changes) Order 2022	Final report February 2022
4 May 2023	The Charnwood (Electoral Changes) Order 2022	Final report February 2022
4 May 2023	The Amber Valley (Electoral Changes) Order 2022	Final report January 2022
4 May 2023	The Rushcliffe (Electoral Changes) Order 2022	Final report May 2022
4 May 2023	The Blaby (Electoral Changes) Order 2022	Final report July 2022
4 May 2023	The Chesterfield (Electoral Changes) Order 2022	Final report August 2022
4 May 2023	The Derby (Electoral Changes) Order 2023	Final report October 2022
1 May 2025	The West Northamptonshire (Electoral Changes) Order 2024	Final report August 2023
1 May 2025	The North Northamptonshire (Electoral Changes) Order 2024	Final report October 2023
1 May 2025	The Derbyshire (Electoral Changes) Order 2024	Final report July 2024

=== Changes resulting from parish council boundary changes ===
These orders were made to subsequent to changes to civil parish boundaries.

Date	Statutory Instrument	Cause
1 May 2008; 4 June 2009	The West Lindsey (Electoral Changes) Order 2007	Transfer of areas from Scothern to Barlings
2 May 2013; 7 May 2015	The District of Blaby (Electoral Changes) Order 2012	Transfer of areas from Leicester Forest East to Braunstone
7 May 2015; 4 May 2017	The East Northamptonshire (Electoral Changes) Order 2015	Transfers of areas between the following parishes: Chelveston cum Caldecott to Stanwick; Higham Ferrers to Irthlingborough; Irthlingborough to Higham Ferrers; Islip to Thrapston; Raunds to Ringstead; Ringstead to Raunds; Stanwick to Chelveston cum Caldecott; Stanwick to Irthlingborough; Changes to parish ward boundaries in Higham Ferrers and Rushden

== Structural changes ==
Date	Statutory Instrument	LGCE Report(s)
1 April 1997	The Derbyshire (City of Derby) (Structural Change) Order 1995	Draft report May 1993 Final report November 1993; Draft report September 1994 Final report January 1995
1 April 1997	The Leicestershire (City of Leicester and District of Rutland) (Structural Change) Order 1996	Draft report June 1994 Final report December 1994
1 April 1998	The Nottinghamshire (City of Nottingham) (Structural Change) Order 1996	Draft report July 1994 Final report December 1994
1 April 2021	The Northamptonshire (Structural Change) Order 2020	

Other structural reviews

- Northamptonshire - Draft report July 1994 Final report December 1994
- Broxtowe, Gedling and Rushcliffe - Draft report September 1995 Final report December 1995
- Northampton - Draft report September 1995 Final report December 1995
- A report on the 1992-1995 Structural Review May 1995
- Overview report of 21 Districts in England September 1995
