= Fitness trail =

Path consisting of outdoor exercise equipment

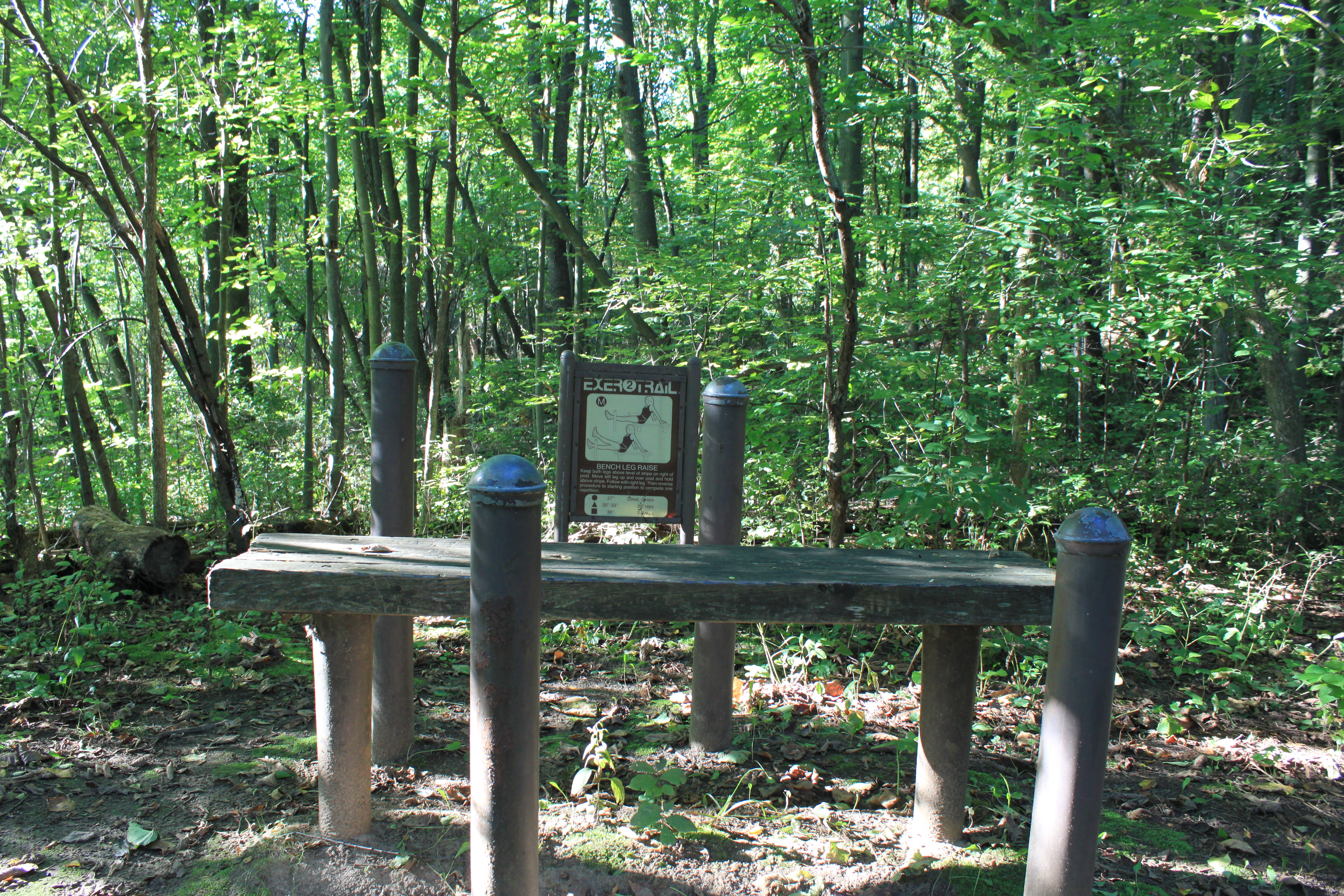
Fitness trail station, North Bay Park, Ypsilanti Township, Michigan

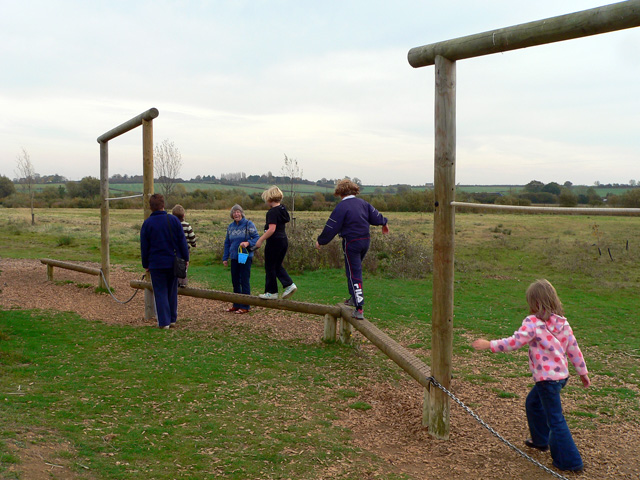
Balance beam at Stanwick Lakes in Stanwick, England

A fitness trail, trim trail or parcourse consists of a path or course with outdoor exercise equipment or obstacles installed along its length for exercising the human body to promote good health. The course is designed to promote physical fitness training in the style attributed to Georges Hébert.

In general, fitness trails can be natural or man-made, located in areas such as forest, transportation rights-of-way, parks, or urban settings. Equipment exists to provide specific forms of physiological exercise, and can consist of natural features including climbable rocks, trees, and river embankments, or manufactured products (stepping posts, chin-up and climbing bars) designed to provide similar physical challenges. The degree of difficulty of a course is determined by terrain slope, trail surface (dirt, grass, gravel, etc.), obstacle height (walls) or length (crawls) and other features. Urban parcourses tend to be flat, to permit participation by the elderly, and to accommodate cyclists, runners, skaters and walking.

The more recent concept of an outdoor gym, containing traditional gym equipment specifically designed for outdoor use, is also considered to be a development of the parcourse. These outdoor exercise gyms include moving parts and are often made from galvanised metal.

== History ==
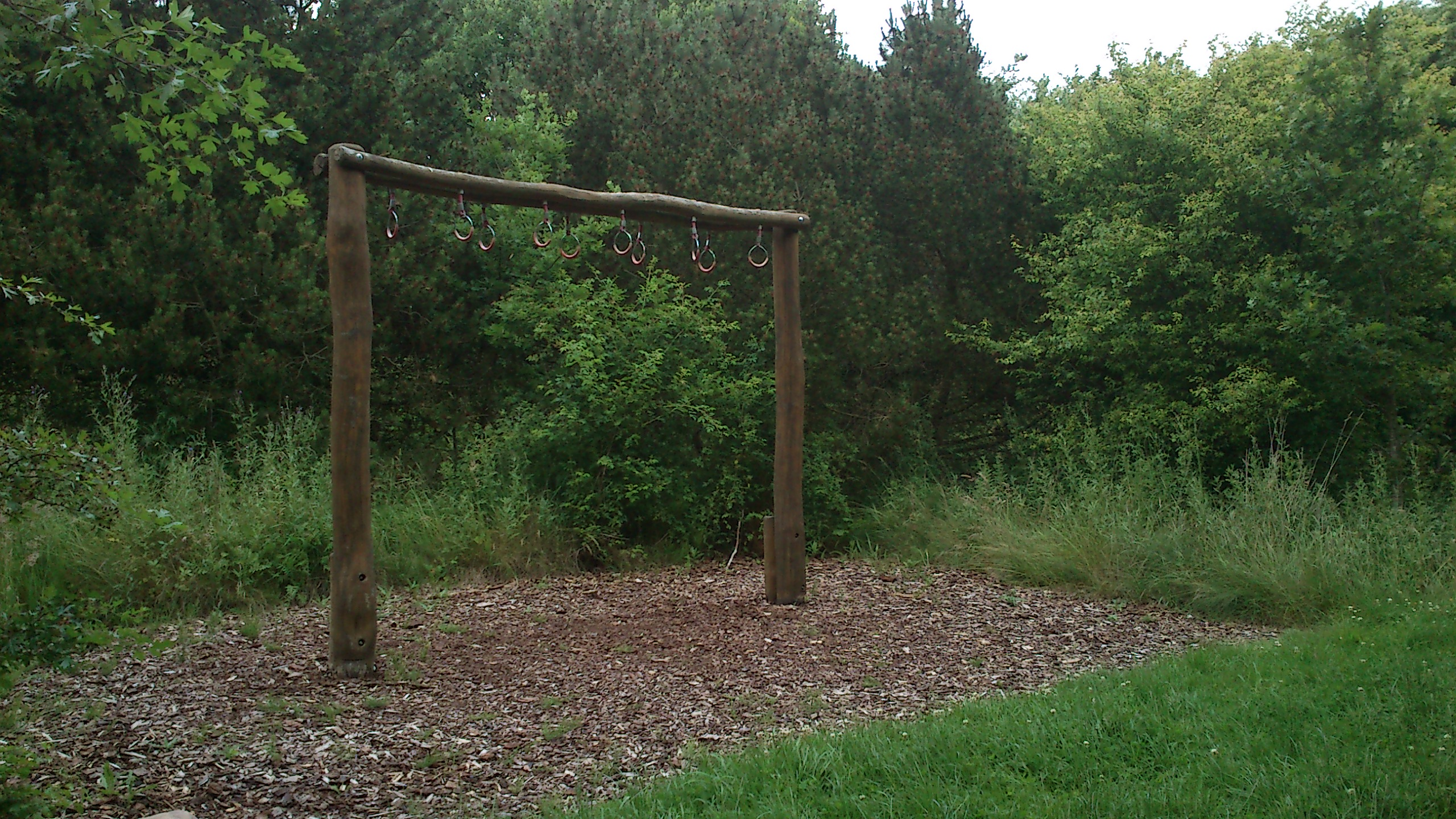
Trim trail station in Denmark

The original parcours was invented in 1968 by Swiss architect Erwin Weckemann with support from Swiss life insurance firm Vita. The first course was built in Zurich, Switzerland. Hundreds of courses were built in Europe by 1972.

Courses built in ensuing years included:

- [US] 1976 "Parcour" exercise trail in County Farm Park in Ann Arbor, Michigan
- [US] 1977 Bruce Jenner Trail in the Lake County, Illinois, Forest Preserve District
- [US] El Estero Exercise Course at Lake El Estero, Monterey, California
- [HK] 1977 Lion Rock Country Park, New Territories, Hong Kong, featuring 15 exercise stations

== Examples ==
=== United Kingdom ===
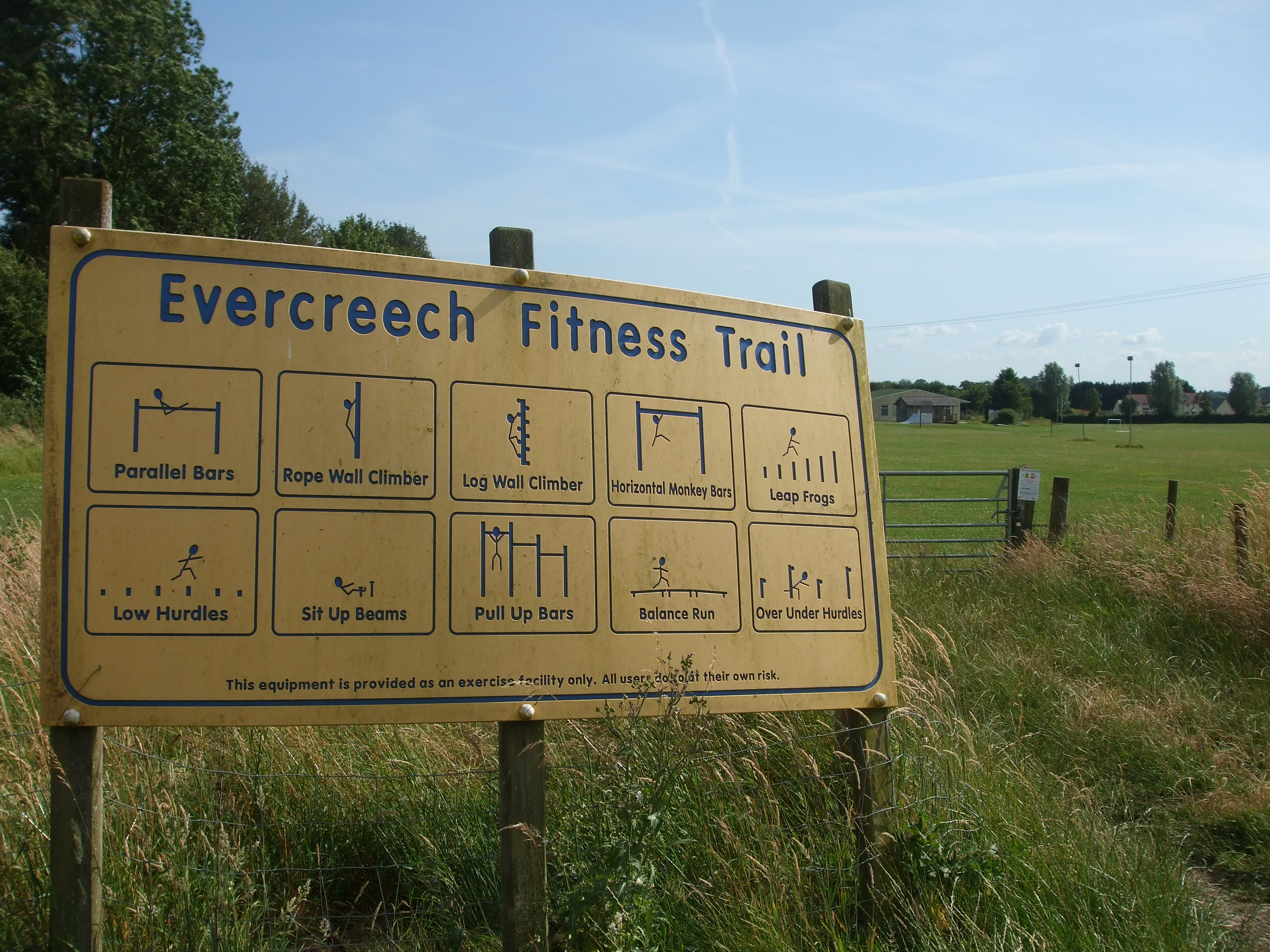
A sign listing all the types of fitness stations at a fitness trail in England

Fitness Trails (also called trim trails) are a series of wooden exercise stations, scattered in parkland or other locations beside a jogging or walking trail, which can be used to develop balance, strength and coordination. They are suitable for both adults and children, and the individual stations have been scientifically designed to provide a range of exercise. Most have simple instructions attached to them, and the stations include balance beams, sit-up bars, chin-up bars, parallel bars, and more challenging stations such as pole climbs and ladder walks. Trails can include stations for the upper body, lower body, balance & coordination and climbing/jumping equipment designed to test the whole body. Bristol City Council have now installed trim trails in six parks, ranging in complexity from Withywood Park, which has a single station, to Victoria Park, which has nine. Funding for the trim trail at Hollingworth Lake, in Greater Manchester, which was the idea of the Friends of Hollingworth Lake and opened in August 2010, was provided by the Big Lottery Community Spaces fund.

=== Australia ===
Installations are found across AU.

=== Canada ===
- Sunnybrook Park in Toronto, Ontario has a Vita Parcours Exercise Trail, along with sports facilities.
- Seeley's Bay, Ontario has a 4 km Vita Parcours trail through Haskins Point
- Bay of St. Lawrence Park, near Gananoque, Ontario

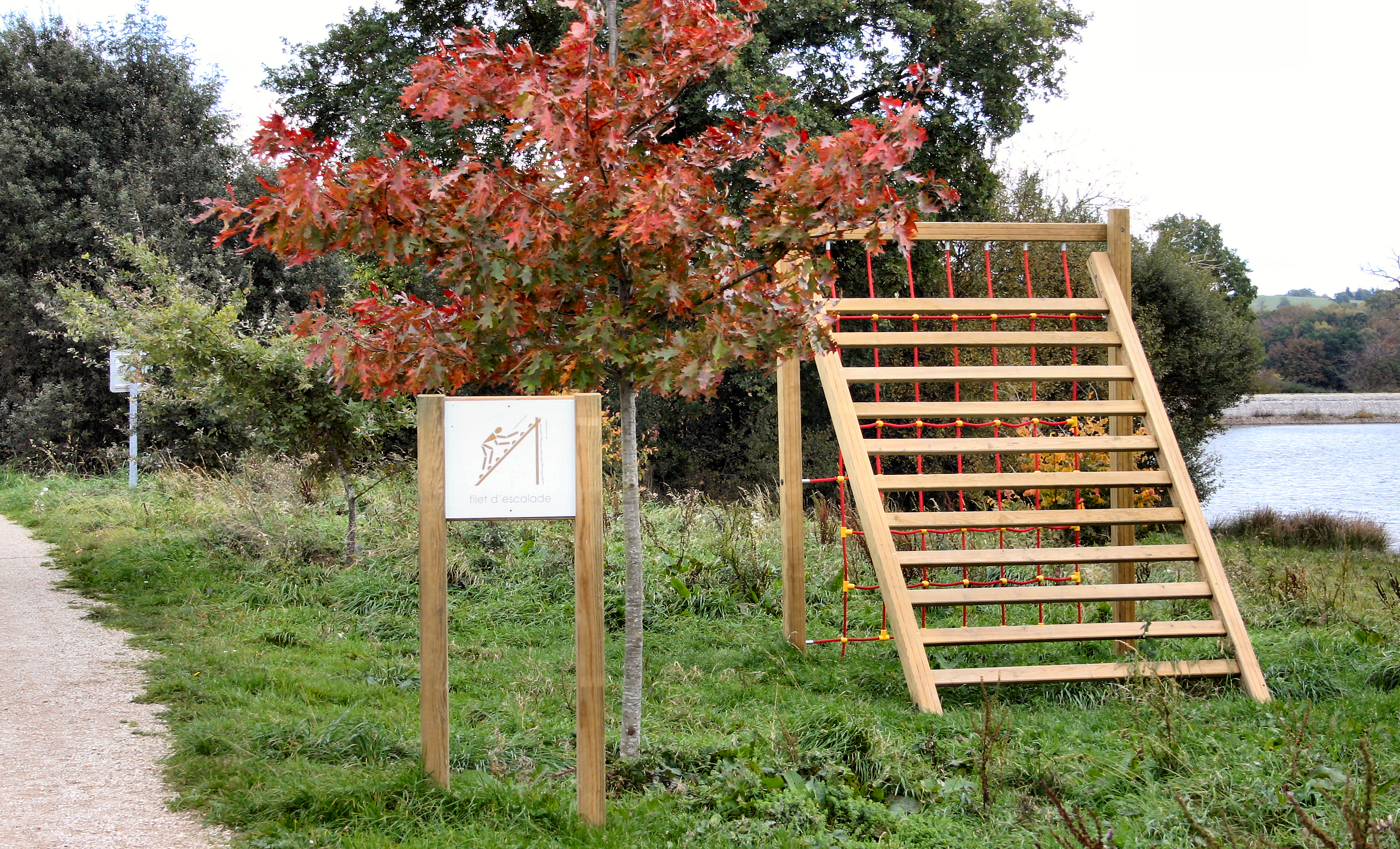

=== Luxembourg ===
- Among pedestrian trails there is a fitness trail in the village of Steinfort.

=== New Zealand ===
- Blockhouse Bay Recreation Reserve, City of Auckland New Zealand.

=== United States ===
==== California ====
===== San Francisco Bay Area =====
East Bay

- An asphalt parcourse, remodeled in 2012, projects into the bay in Marina Park in San Leandro.
- In Moraga, section 2 of the Lafayette-Moraga Regional Trail has an asphalt parcourse.
- A dirt parcourse trail surrounds Bishop Ranch 7 office complex in San Ramon. Although the parcourse is on private property, it is open to public use.
- Under the BART right-of-way along Masonic Avenue, in Albany.
- Pleasanton has two parcourse trails. One borders the northern side of Bernal Corporate Park, paralleling the Arroyo Valle. The other is on the Owens Drive loop west of Johnson Drive.

North Bay

- In Spring Lake Regional Park, Santa Rosa, Sonoma County, an asphalt parcourse surrounds Spring Lake.

San Francisco Peninsula

- The first parcourse trail built in the USA still exists in the Mountain Lake Park of San Francisco's Presidio. The parcourse begins at the beginning of 9th Ave, just north of the intersection of 9th Ave and Lake St.
- A parcourse was built at Sunset Circle Parking Lot near Lake Merced circa 1975.
- The Perrier parcourse is at the site of the former Polo Fields in Golden Gate Park in San Francisco. This course is open for public use.
- There is a parcourse that borders the Marina Green in San Francisco.
- Near the bathrooms at Crissy Field Beach there is a parcourse body curl station
- There are several exercise stations (some new and some from an original parcourse), on the south side of Millbrae Ave. between S Magnolia Ave. and Palm Ave. along the Spur Trail in Millbrae.
- An asphalt paved parcourse trail begins at the 5.9 mi. mark of the Bay Trail, around the perimeter of the Oracle Corporation office complex in Redwood Shores. Although the parcourse is on Oracle property, it is open to public use.
- There is a parcourse with fitness stations clustered along a trail in the Holbrook-Palmer Park on the south side of Watkins Avenue between Dinkelspiel Station Lane and Middlefield Road in Atherton.
- There is a parcourse inside the NASA Ames Research Center. However, an official NASA ID is required to access it.

South Bay

- There is an "outdoor exercise park" in Santa Clara's Central Park.

===== Los Angeles Area =====
- A paved parcourse trail is available at Rynerson Park in Lakewood on Studabaker Road parallel to the San Gabriel River Bike Trail. This parcourse has 6 stations along a 1-mile loop.
- Johnny Carson Park located in Burbank features a parcourse circuit with a dozen stations along a dirt path loop. It also includes a warm-up area with equipment designed to facilitate stretching.
- The Whittwood Towne Center offers a small short vita course set up next to the 24 Hour Fitness Gym.
- In the unincorporated part of South Whittier at Adventure Park all around the baseball diamonds there are numerous stations.

===== Riverside Area =====
- A dirt fitness trail, including stations with scaling walls, pull-up bars, and other activities, runs around Lincoln Park on Lincoln Avenue in Corona.

===== Lake Tahoe Area =====
- There is an 18 station par course at North Tahoe Regional Park, which is located at 6600 Donner Road, one mile west of Highway 267 and one mile north of Highway 28 in Tahoe Vista.

===== San Diego Area =====
- Morley Fields Sport complex - Perrier Parcourse Fitness Circuit. This fitness circuit was donated by the Groeat

Waters of France Company, distributor of Perrier water. The circuit includes eighteen exercise stations spaced over a 2.5 mile path.

- Downtown San Diego, Embarcadero Marina Park South. Fitness course with various stations. Incorporate the Convention Center stairs into the course for a killer workout. NOTE: Area is closed frequently in the summer for concerts: Access during this time is limited to the morning - late afternoon.

==== Colorado ====
- Waneka Lake Trail, Lafayette, Colorado - 10 fitness stations along 1.2-mile lake perimeter trail, most of which is soft surface (crusher fines)
- Bear Creek Lake Park in Lakewood, Colorado has a 1.6-mile cross country fitness course with 19 exercise stations beginning at the Pelican Point parking area

==== District of Columbia ====
- In Rock Creek Park, there is a parcourse on the trail that starts just south of the Woodley Park station of the Washington Metro.

==== Florida ====
- Cooper's Bayou Park on Bayshore Blvd in Clearwater features a short trail with 15 fitness stations.
- The Meadows in Sarasota has a longstanding Fit-Trail for Country Club members, featuring 20 fitness stations.

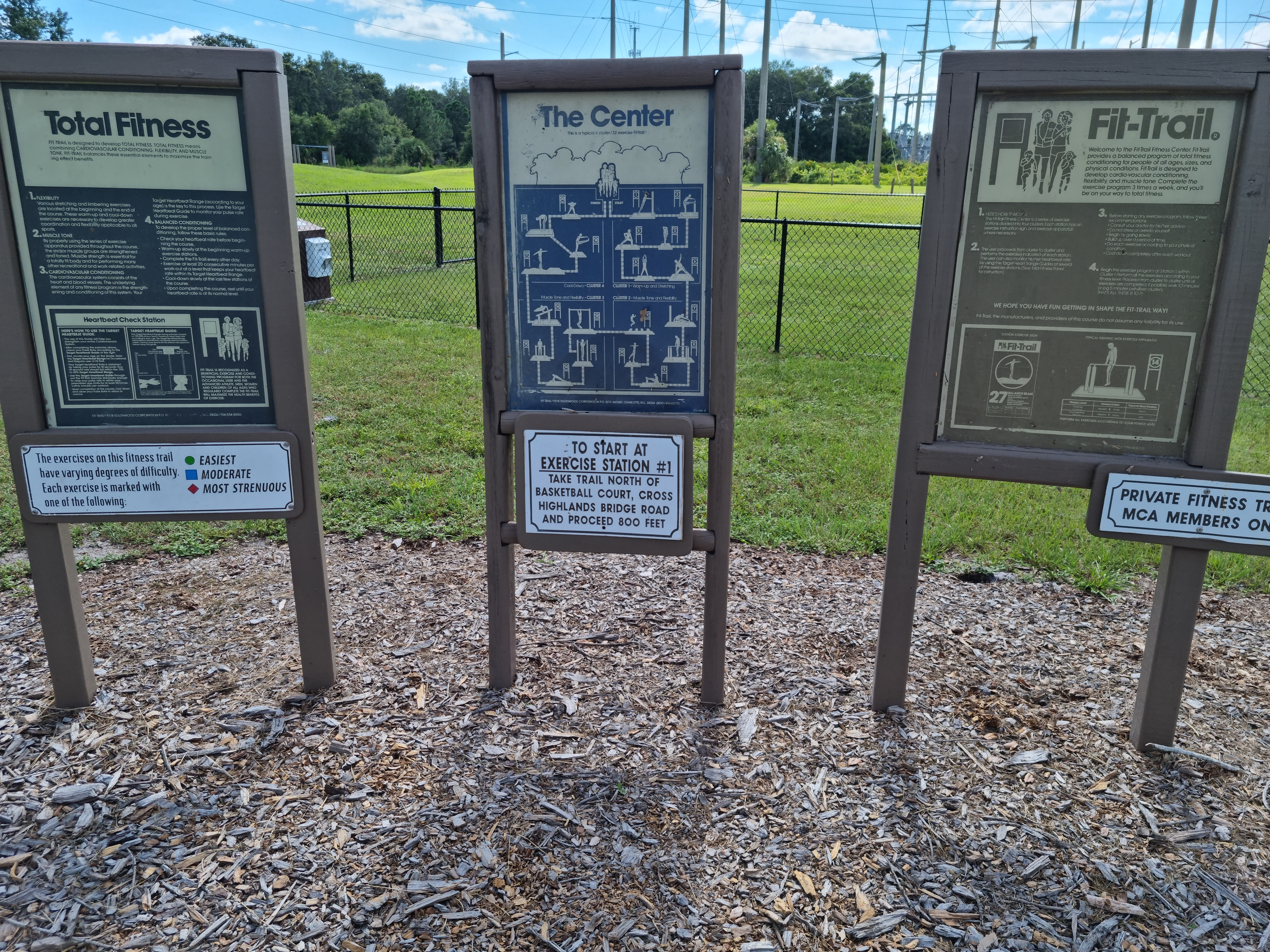
The start of The Meadows fitness trail in Sarasota, Florida.

==== Georgia ====
- In Waycross, there is a parcourse located in the woods surrounding Waycross College.

Kansas

- In Lenexa, there is a Vita Course 2000 fitness trail that runs around the perimeter of Gear For Sports.

==== Kentucky ====
- Giles Conrad Park in Boone County features a 1.3 mile trail dotted with fitness stations.

==== Maryland ====
- Prince George County Parks and Recreation Chernikoff Fitness Trail
- Downs Park in Pasadena, Anne Arundel County
- NCR TRAIL in Parkton
- Along the south side of the trail around Lake Elkhorn in Howard County.

==== Michigan ====
- Macomb County

In Washington Township there is a fitness trail at Stony Creek Metropark

- Marquette County

In Marquette there is a fitness trail located along the Fit Strip adjacent to Park Cemetery.

- Washtenaw County

Ypsilanti, MI North Bay Park.

- Delta County, Gladstone, MI VanCleve City Park

==== New Jersey ====
- In Jersey City there is a parcourse trail with 15 stations in Liberty State Park
- In High Bridge there is a 1 mile parcourse trail with 10 or so stations in Voorhees State Park
- In Holmdel there is a parcourse trail in Holmdel Park

==== Ohio ====
- In Hamilton County, Embshoff Woods, Miami Whitewater Forest, Sharon Woods, Triple Creek, Winton Woods, and Woodland Mound county parks have parcourse trails.
- In Summit County, there are two parcourse trails as part of the Summit Metro Parks system. A 1.8 mile trail is at Goodyear Metropark, and a 1.4 mile trail is part of the Sand Run Metropark. Both are well maintained dirt trails in hilly, wooded settings. Both are located in Akron, Ohio.
- In Cuyahoga County, there is a parcourse trail as a part of the Cleveland Metroparks system. A trail is at South Chagrin Reservation.

==== Pennsylvania ====
- In Frick Park, Pittsburgh, there's a paved parcourse trail starting at the intersection of Beechwood Boulevard and Nicholson Street with 18 stations. The signs along the trail date from 1975.
- In South Park, Pittsburgh, there's a Fit-trail near the gazebo on Maple Springs Drive. Installed September 2013
- In Toftrees, Pennsylvania, State College, you will find a paved trail near the first set of apartments as you turn off of 322 on Toftrees, Ave. labeled as a Par-Course. This trail will take you around the Toftrees Golf Resort and around the condos and apartments surrounding. Note, some of the stations appear to be in disrepair and overgrown with vegetation; the course may no longer be maintained.

==== Tennessee ====
- In Franklin, Pinkerton Park, located near downtown, has a 1-mile fitness trail.

==== Texas ====
- In Austin, the Shoal Creek Trail features a three-station parcourse near its intersection with 30th St.
- In Sugar Land, a parcourse is located adjacent to Highlands Elementary School at the intersection of Williams Trace Boulevard and Edgewater Drive.
- In Missouri City, a more compact course is located behind the LA Fitness at 5402 Texas 6, on Cross Lakes Boulevard.

==== Vermont ====
- The Burlington Bike Path features many fitness stations

==== Virginia ====
- In Charlottesville, Pen Park has a 0.5 mile, 13 station parcourse fitness trail.
- In Fairfax Station, Burke Lake Park has a 1.5-mile, 18 station parcourse.
- In Richmond, Byrd Park has a 1-mile fitness trail.
- In Vienna, Nottoway Park has a 0.75 mile fitness trail.
- In Winchester, Jim Barnett Park has a 1-mile, 18 station parcourse.

==== Washington ====
- Maintained list of Fitness Trails in the Puget Sound area.

==== Wisconsin ====
- In Madison, Wisconsin The Fitness Trail begins on the Near East Fields, and continues along the Lakeshore Path to the west. The trail contains nine stations and is approximately 0.75 miles long.
- In Peninsula State Park The Vita Course circles the amphitheater in a 1 mile loop featuring 13 station.

=== South America ===
==== Colombia ====
- In Sendero las Brumas, Valle del Cauca has a 4.3 mile fitness trail

=== France ===
- In Paris Parc Floral has a 1.2 mile fitness trail.

== See also ==
- Chin-up bar
- Free running
- Parkour
- Obstacle course
- Outdoor fitness
- Outdoor gym
- Street workout
