= Raunds =

Market town in Northamptonshire, England

Coordinates: 52.345°N 0.537°W

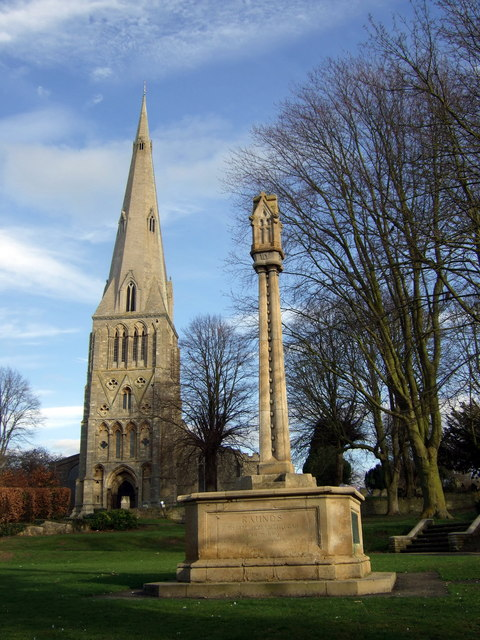
- St Peter's Church and War Memorial

- Location within Northamptonshire
- Population: 9,379 (2021 Census)
- OS grid reference: SP9972
- Civil parish: Raunds
- Unitary authority: North Northamptonshire
- Ceremonial county: Northamptonshire
- Region: East Midlands
- Country: England
- Sovereign state: United Kingdom
- Post town: WELLINGBOROUGH
- Postcode district: NN9
- Dialling code: 01933
- Police: Northamptonshire
- Fire: Northamptonshire
- Ambulance: East Midlands
- UK Parliament: Corby and East Northamptonshire

Raunds /ˈrɔːndz/ is a market town in North Northamptonshire, England. It had a population of 9,379 at the 2021 census.

== Geography ==
Raunds is situated 21 miles (34 km) north-east of Northampton. The town is on the southern edge of the Nene Valley and surrounded by arable farming land.

Nearest civilian airports are Luton 50 miles, Birmingham International Airport 62 miles and East Midlands 65 miles.

Raunds is close to Stanwick Lakes, a country park developed from gravel pits and managed by the Rockingham Forest Trust. This park is internationally recognised for its birdlife and can be reached on foot from Raunds along Meadow Lane bridleway.

On 9 August 1911 Raunds recorded 36.7 °C (98.1 °F), then the highest temperature recorded in the UK. The town jointly held the record with Canterbury, Kent for 79 years, only being broken in 1990.

== History ==
In the mid-1980s, during sand excavations in the Nene Valley, the remains of a Roman villa were discovered. Excavation of the area, near Stanwick, was delayed by several years while archaeologists studied the remains. In 2002 Channel 4's Time Team excavated a garden and found remains of an Anglo-Saxon cemetery.

The place-name Raunds is first attested in an Anglo-Saxon charter of c. 972–992, where it appears as Randan. It appears as Rande in Domesday Book (1086); and as Raundes in a later survey of Northamptonshire. The name is the plural of the Old English rand, meaning "border".

Raunds played a role in the boot and shoe industry until its decline in the 1950s and 1960s. In 1905 a dispute arose about wages to be paid to army bootmakers, which culminated in a march to London in May that year. Several factories remained into the early 1990s but all are now closed, with many being demolished and housing estates built. The Coggins boot factory was the last to go, and the site of it is now Coggins Close. The land on which the shoe factory and the original Coggins houses stood (not Coggins Close), was purchased by Robert Coggins on 25 February 1899 from the Duchy of Lancaster, for the sum of £14.10s.0d (£14.50). The houses are still there, but were sold to Charles Robinson of Wellingborough in 1934. Robert Coggins lived in the hall where his picture hangs in the meeting room, and he is buried in St Peter's Churchyard. There is no industry in the town now, although there are some industrial sites on the outskirts.

Raunds once held the record for the highest temperature in Britain at 36.7 °C (98.1 °F), set on 10 August 1911, which stood until 1990.

== Notable buildings ==
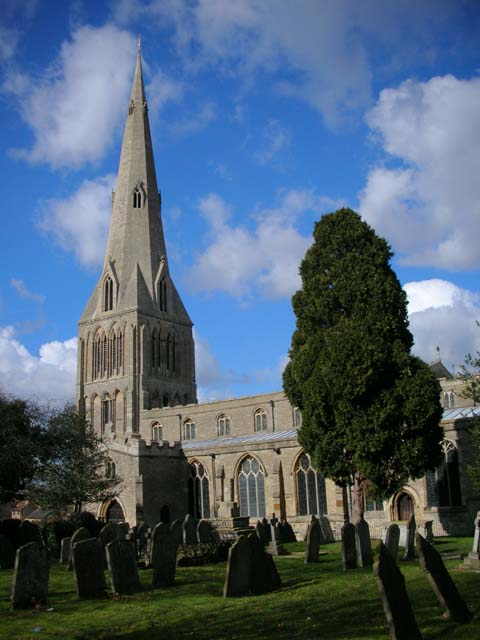
St Peter's Church, Raunds

The Historic England website contains details of a total of 19 listed buildings and six scheduled monuments at or in the vicinity of Raunds. Amongst them are:

- St Peter's Church, Church Street.
- The Manor House, 2 Manor Street.

St Peter's, CoE is in the Diocese of Peterborough and St Thomas More's, RC is in the Diocese of Northampton.

== Demography ==
- In 1801 there were 800 persons
- In 1831 there were 1,370 persons
- In 1841 there were 1,653 persons
- In 2011 there were 8,641 persons
- In 2021 there were 9,379 persons

== Transport ==
=== Road ===
Raunds is adjacent to the A45 and close to the A14 jct 13. Access to the M1 and A1 is close and the A14 runs from Britain's largest container port at Felixstowe in Suffolk to join the M6. Consequently, the area attracts distribution companies warehouses.

=== Bus ===
Bus services are limited, the X46 links the town with Wellingborough, Rushden and Northampton, running hourly. There are intermittent routes to Huntingdon and a local service termed the 'Raunds Rover'.

=== Rail ===
Connections are provided by East Midlands Railway from Wellingborough and Kettering railway stations, for direct trains to London St Pancras International, Nottingham, Sheffield and Leeds.

There was once a Raunds railway station, on the Midland Railway's cross-country line from Kettering to Huntingdon, closed in September 1959, and which gave access to St Ives and Cambridge, though Raunds station was sited 1 1/2 miles from the town. It was also planned that the Midland's Wellingborough to Higham Ferrers branch, also closed in 1959, would continue to Raunds, but landowners prevented it.

The Manchester, Sheffield & Lincolnshire Railway (the forerunner of the Great Central), proposed a line from Doncaster to Raunds in an early version of its bid to build a trunk line to the capital. This line never came to fruition, and the company eventually built its London Extension via Nottingham, Leicester, Rugby and Brackley.

=== Waterways ===
Stanwick Lakes are within walking or cycling distance of Raunds, and river ways connect to the Nene Valley river section. By boat, Oundle can be reached in a day. The Nene Valley river section connects to the Middle Level Navigation System, making it possible to reach Cambridge and Peterborough. The nearest marina is Willy Watt's in Ringstead, Northamptonshire.

== Trade ==
There are many small businesses and many people commute to larger centres for work. Raunds is home to a Hotpoint distribution centre, and depots for Robert Wiseman Dairies, Avery Dennison, DPD, Howdens Joinery and Dr. Martens, all located on the Warth Park estate. Raunds Co-operative Society ran a supermarket and department store and had 4,000 members until 2007 when it merged with the larger Midlands Co-operative Society. There is also an Asda store in the town, which opened on 24 April 2017. The shops still operate.

A market is held on Fridays in the square. Regular stalls include butchers, plant stockists, home-made jewellery and confectioners. Local organisations and clubs can also set up a stall.

== Education ==
Raunds has:

- a day nursery
- a playgroup
- an infant school
- a primary school
- a junior school
- a secondary school,

== Culture ==
Raunds holds an annual music festival over a weekend in early May. Events include: rock, jazz and folk concerts starring nationally and internationally known artists, performances by Raunds Community Choir and Raunds Temperance Band, song and tune sessions, dancing displays, a ceilidh and an annual youth dance competition.

Raunds Music and Drama Society (MADS) holds several stage performances throughout the year.

The town holds a Christmas festival in the square. Continental markets are held annually to celebrate neighbouring countries.

Woodbine Working Men's Club (1901–2005) and the Conservative Club (1920 to date) have offered community and recreational facilities.

For the past few years, an annual beer festival has been held at the cricket club. This features a range of local beers and ciders, as well as traditional world beverages, accompanied by local music artists.

== Media ==
Local news and television programmes are provided by BBC East and ITV Anglia. Television signals are received from the Sandy Heath TV transmitter.

The town's local radio stations are BBC Radio Northampton on 103.6 FM, Heart East on 96.6 FM and Smooth East Midlands (formerly Connect FM) on 97.2 FM.

Local newspapers are the Northampton Herald & Post and Northamptonshire Telegraph.

== Sport and leisure ==
=== Football ===
Raunds Town F.C. are at Kiln Park and play in the United Counties League. As well as the first team, they also have reserve, women's and youth teams.
Raunds Tigers F.C. focus on junior football and have several youth teams.

=== Cricket ===
Raunds Town Cricket Club have a ground in Marshalls Road. The team plays in the Northamptonshire Cricket League.

=== Archery ===
Archers of Raunds meet at Manor School.

== Mayors of Raunds ==
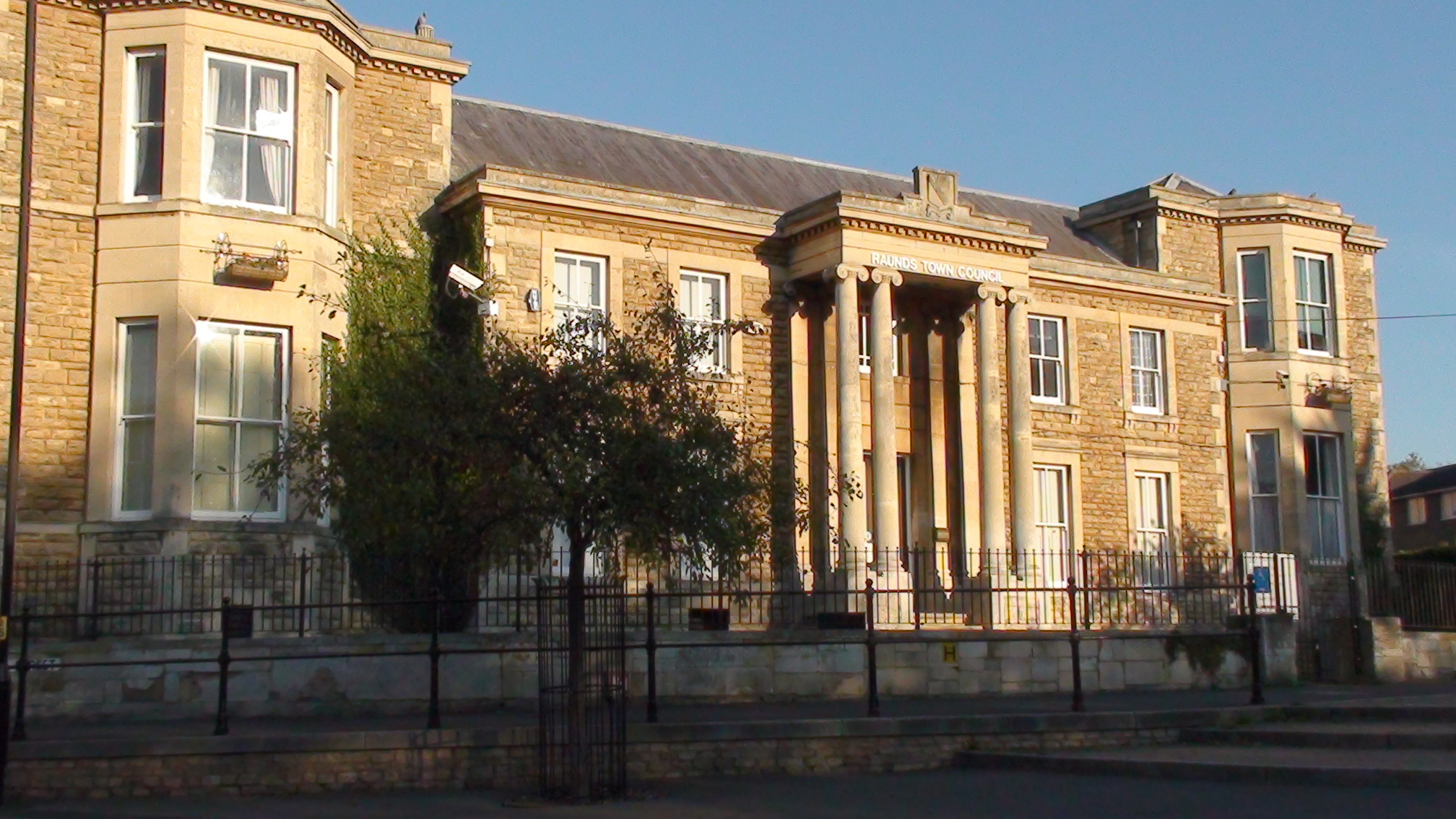
Raunds Town Council Offices

In 2005, Raunds Town Council decided to elect a Mayor rather than having a chairman of the council.

Holders of the post have been:

2005-06: Lisa Costello
2006-07: Dudley Hughes
2007-08: Michelle Goring
2008-10: Peter Wathen
2010-13: Michael Clements
2013-14: Pauline Williams
2014-15: Louisa Thomas
2015-17: Helen Howell
2017-18: Nicholas Beck
2018-20: Richard Levell
2020-22: Sylvia Hughes
2022-23: Richard Levell
2023-25: Paul Byrne
2025- : Richard Levell

== Town councillors ==
=== Saxon Ward ===
Ray Comer
Bill Cross
Ollie Curtis
Helen Howell
Magdalena Levell
Lee Wilkes

=== Windmill Ward ===
Paul Byrne
Richard Levell
Paul Edwards
Adam Fernley
Julia Hague
Hayley Hill

== Notable former residents ==
- Ada Salter (1866–1942), environmentalist
- Elizabeth Emery (1841–1924) Born in Raunds the daughter of William Emery and Dinah Wiles. She emigrated it the US in 1850 to stay with her sister Maria as most of the rest of her family had died. Elizabeth married George Porterfield Gates on 30 September 1861 in Illinois. Their granddaughter [Elizabeth Virginia Wallace] (usually known as Bess) was born on the 13th of February 1885 in Independence Missouri and went on the marry Harry S Truman there on the 28th June 1919. Truman was elected as vice president of the US and became president when Roosevelt died in April 1945. Bess died on the 10th of October 1982
- Sir David Frost (1939–2013), television personality

== Nearby settlements ==
Ringstead, Keyston, Stanwick, Rushden, Higham Ferrers, Thrapston, Hargrave, Wellingborough, Irthlingborough, Chelveston
