= War Memorial, Stanwick =

War memorial in Stanwick, Northamptonshire, England

Coordinates: 52.33213°N 0.56328°W

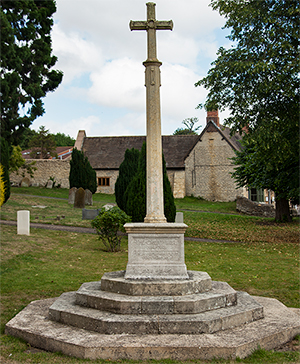
Stanwick's War Memorial

The War Memorial is a Grade II listed structure located in the churchyard of the Church of St Laurence in the village of Stanwick.

The memorial is a tapering octagonal shaft, about 5 metres tall, made of sandstone. It is topped with a cross brought back from the battlefield cemeteries by one of the families. It is set on a square plinth which is set on four layers of octagonal steps. The names of the deceased are inscribed on three of the faces of the plinth. The fourth, west face of the plinth contains the commemoration details.

    THE GREAT WAR
      1914-1918
THEIR NAME SHALL LIVE
    FOR EVERMORE
      1939-1945

== History ==
On 9 May 1915 four Stanwick men of the Northamptonshire Regiment were killed during the Battle of Aubers Ridge; James Brawn, Thomas Craven and brothers, Herbert and William Felce.

On 8 May 1921 Stanwick's War Memorial was unveiled by Colonel Pratt, Lord of the Manor. The memorial was erected to commemorate those who had died during The First World War and the names of those who had died during The Second World War were added to the base of the memorial after that conflict had ended. The memorial is unique in that it is topped with a genuine cross brought back from the battlefield cemeteries.

On 8 May 1945, the Allies formally accepted Germany’s unconditional surrender of its armed forces, marking the end of World War II in Europe. This date is celebrated in the United Kingdom and the Commonwealth as Victory in Europe Day.

In 2015, Historic England added the memorial to the National Heritage List for England as a Grade II structure, as "an eloquent witness to the tragic impact of world events on the local community, and the sacrifice it made in the conflicts of the twentieth century".

== Names on the memorial ==
War Memorial
South Face	East Face	North Face
World War One (1914-1918)
William Andrews	Herbert Felce	Reginald Morris
Edward W. Barker	William R. Felce	Frank L. Richards
William S. Bird	Charles W. Foskett	Edgar H. Robins
James Brawn	George Foskett	Reginald S. Sawford
Arthur Burton	John L. French	Thomas C. Tailby
Enos O. Coles	Arthur W. Hall	George W. Thurlow
Cecil Cox	Albert Harrison	Robert H. Ward
Sidney Cox	Edgar Jarvis	Horace R. Warner
John Craven	Jesse Lawman	Sidney W. Warner
Thomas Craven	Walter Lawman	George S. Watford
Alfred E. G. Curral	Edward H. Morris	George Webb
John W. Elliott	John G. Morris	William Wells
World War Two (1939-1945)
Bert Baldwin	Rex Gent	Alexander J. Ryan
George Carpenter	Leonard M. Morris	Stanley Tompkins
Gordon Clark	Stanley W. Nicholls	David L. G. York
Sonnie Craven	Ted Palmer	Willis S. York
Reg Dickerson	Thomas Phillips	
