= Manor School =

Location
- Mountbatten Way; Raunds; Wellingborough, Northamptonshire, NN9 6PA; England; 52.34285°N 0.5309°W

Information
- Type: Academy
- Local authority: North Northamptonshire
- Department for Education URN: 137613 Tables
- Ofsted: Reports
- Principal: Adam Crawte
- Gender: Coeducational
- Age: 11 to 18
- Enrolment: 1008
- Houses: Acer, Betula, Quercus
- Colours: Burnt Orange, Navy Blue, Grey
- Website: https://www.manorschool.northants.sch.uk/

Manor School is an academy school in Raunds, Northamptonshire, England, which serves the town of Raunds and many surrounding villages. The current Principal is Mr Adam Crawte. The school is part of Nene Education Trust. There were 1,044 pupils on roll in the 2022/2023 school year. There are 66 teachers (full-time equivalent) and 23 support staff. The school became an Academy on 1 November 2011. In 2024, the school was deemed as 'inadequate' by Ofsted.

== Achievement ==
In the school's latest Ofsted report in 2024, the school was deemed to be "inadequate." In 2015 the school achieved results of 51% of pupils gaining at least 5 GCSEs at C grade or above including English and mathematics.

=== Percentage of pupils achieving 5+ GCSEs including math and English ===
- 2011: 57%
- 2012: 51%
- 2013: 50%
- 2014: 50%
- 2015: 51%
- 2017: 52%

== Clubs and societies ==
The school runs a number of school clubs and is also home to a number of external clubs that use the facilities outside of school hours.

== Former Students ==
- Chris Carruthers - Footballer
