= Manor House, Raunds =

Grade II listed building in the United Kingdom

Coordinates: 52.3456°N 0.5343°W

The Manor House is a Grade II listed building that stands on a site at the northeast corner of the junction of Manor Street and High Street in Raunds, Northamptonshire, England.

== Building ==
A detailed description of the building appears in the relevant entry on the English Heritage website and is based on an external inspection of the structure. The entry states that the building was constructed during the period from the mid-17th century to the 19th century with some more recent changes. However, there is evidence that the Manor House also contains earlier elements, as parts of a 15th-century solar measuring 4.9 by 6.5 meters have been identified within the fabric of the existing building and two reused molded stones may date from the 12th or 13th century.

== History ==
Raunds has a complicated manorial history, a number of different manors having been in existence within the parish. One of these was inherited in 1475 by Margaret, wife of John Gage, who was the daughter and heir of John Tawyer. After then, that manor came to be known as “Gage’s Manor” and remained with the Gage family until the 17th century.

Accounts of the descent of the manor appears in a number of sources, including the Victoria County History A more recent study in 1992 by Wessex Archaeology, which discusses previous works and bases its own conclusions for the descent of Gage's Manor on extensive reference to original documentary sources. It notes that previous names for the building included Hall Farm.

It is not possible to be sure exactly who resided in the house at most stages of its history. However, the will of George Gage of Raunds, which was made in June 1557, does specifically refer to “the Manor place of Rauns which I now dwell in”.
