= The Meadows, Florida =

- Census-designated place
- Location in Sarasota County and the state of Florida
- Coordinates: 27°22′12″N 82°28′08″W
- Country: United States
- State: Florida
- County: Sarasota

Area
  - Total: 2.56 sq mi (6.64 km^{2})
  - Land: 2.38 sq mi (6.16 km^{2})
  - Water: 0.19 sq mi (0.48 km^{2})
- Elevation: 26 ft (7.9 m)

Population (2020)
  - Total: 5,037
  - Density: 2,119.0/sq mi (818.16/km^{2})
- Time zone: UTC-5 (Eastern (EST))
  - Summer (DST): UTC-4 (EDT)
- ZIP code: 34235
- Area code: 941
- FIPS code: 12-71580
- GNIS feature ID: 2402924

The Meadows is a census-designated place (CDP) in Sarasota County, Florida, United States. The population was 5,037 at the 2020 census, up from 3,994 at the 2010 census. The CDP is part of the North Port–Bradenton–Sarasota, Florida Metropolitan Statistical Area.

== Geography ==
According to the United States Census Bureau, the CDP has a total area of 2.3 square miles (6.0 km^{2}), of which 2.2 square miles (5.6 km^{2}) is land and 0.15 square miles (0.4 km^{2}), or 6.18%, is water.

== Demographics ==
Historical population
Census	Pop.	Note	%±
1990	3,437		—
2000	4,423		28.7%
2010	3,994		−9.7%
2020	5,037		26.1%
U.S. Decennial Census

=== 2020 census ===
As of the 2020 census, The Meadows had a population of 5,037. The median age was 71.6 years. 3.6% of residents were under the age of 18 and 66.9% of residents were 65 years of age or older. For every 100 females there were 78.6 males, and for every 100 females age 18 and over there were 78.0 males age 18 and over.

100.0% of residents lived in urban areas, while 0.0% lived in rural areas.

There were 2,937 households in The Meadows, of which 4.8% had children under the age of 18 living in them. Of all households, 40.5% were married-couple households, 17.5% were households with a male householder and no spouse or partner present, and 36.4% were households with a female householder and no spouse or partner present. About 45.5% of all households were made up of individuals and 33.3% had someone living alone who was 65 years of age or older.

There were 3,989 housing units, of which 26.4% were vacant. The homeowner vacancy rate was 2.2% and the rental vacancy rate was 13.8%.

Racial composition as of the 2020 census
Race	Number	Percent
White	4,658	92.5%
Black or African American	95	1.9%
American Indian and Alaska Native	6	0.1%
Asian	47	0.9%
Native Hawaiian and Other Pacific Islander	0	0.0%
Some other race	62	1.2%
Two or more races	169	3.4%
Hispanic or Latino (of any race)	195	3.9%

=== Demographic estimates ===
The median household income was $59,293. 7.8% of the population lived below the poverty threshold. 95.5% of households had a computer, and 91.7% of households had a broadband internet subscription.

19.0% of the population were foreign-born persons. There were 877 veterans living in the CDP.
