= Hargrave, Northamptonshire =

Village in Northamptonshire, England

Hargrave
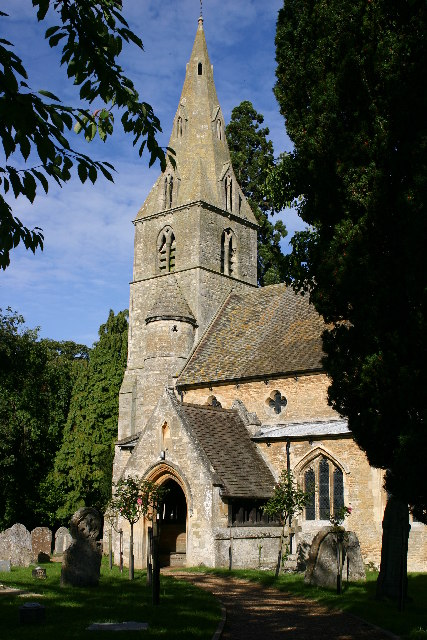
- All Hallows Church

- Location within Northamptonshire
- Population: 241 (2011)
- OS grid reference: TL0370
- Unitary authority: North Northamptonshire
- Ceremonial county: Northamptonshire
- Region: East Midlands
- Country: England
- Sovereign state: United Kingdom
- Post town: Wellingborough
- Postcode district: NN9
- Dialling code: 01933
- Police: Northamptonshire
- Fire: Northamptonshire
- Ambulance: East Midlands
- UK Parliament: Corby and East Northamptonshire

Hargrave is a small village and civil parish situated in rural Northamptonshire, England, approximately 21 miles east of Northampton and adjacent to the Northamptonshire-Cambridgeshire-Bedfordshire border. At the time of the 2001 census, the parish's population was 236 people, increasing to 241 at the 2011 census.

The villages name origin is uncertain. 'The hare grove', 'hoar grove' or in a transferred sense of Old English 'har', 'boundary grove' which it could potentially be because the parish borders both Cambridgeshire and Bedfordshire.

The 12th century, All Hallows Church is at the centre of the village. The village has a village hall with several active societies.

In 2007, Hargrave, Raunds, Ringstead and Stanwick were legally united as "The 4 Spires Benefice", with each village retaining its own church.

== Heritage assets ==
The following buildings and structures are listed by Historic England as of special architectural or historic interest.

- Church of All Saints and chest tomb (Grade II*) 12th century 52.32406°N 0.48046°W
- Stone coffin, Church of All Saints (Grade II) 13th century 52.32399°N 0.48036°W
- Churchlands (Grade II) 17th century 52.32406°N 0.48134°W
- Wildacre (Grade II) 17th century 52.32612°N 0.48537°W
- Pair of chest tombs (Grade II) 17th century 52.32393°N 0.48050°W
- Nag's Head public house (Grade II) 17th century 52.32441°N 0.47989°W
- Box Tree Cottage and attached house (Grade II) 17th century 52.32451°N 0.48065°W
- Group of three chest tombs (Grade II) 18th century 52.32408°N 0.48020°W
- Hillstone Cottage (Grade II) 18th century 52.33059°N 0.48670°W
- War memorial (Grade II) 20th century 52.32388°N 0.48013°W

== Geography ==
Ringstead, Keyston, Stanwick, Rushden, Higham Ferrers, Thrapston, Raunds, Wellingborough, Chelveston, Irthlingborough, Upper Dean, Shelton and Covington are places near Hargrave.

== Demography ==
- In 1801 there were 158 persons
- In 1831 there were 203 persons
- In 1841 there were 257 persons
- In 2001 there were 236 persons
- In 2011 there were 241 persons
