= Ringstead, Northamptonshire =

Village in Northamptonshire, England

Ringstead
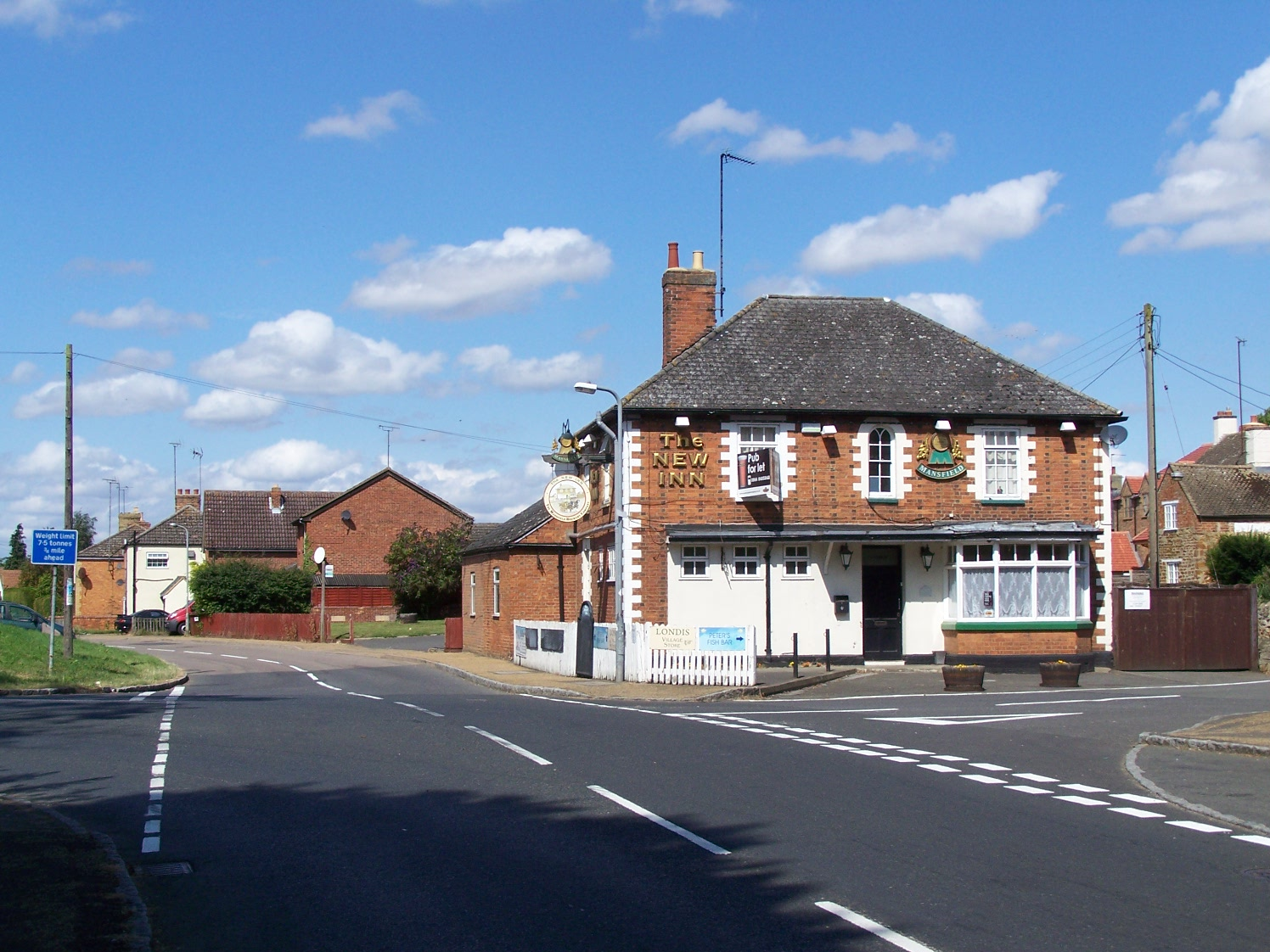
- New Inn

- Location within Northamptonshire
- Population: 1,461 (2011 census)
- OS grid reference: SP9875
- Unitary authority: North Northamptonshire
- Ceremonial county: Northamptonshire
- Region: East Midlands
- Country: England
- Sovereign state: United Kingdom
- Post town: Kettering
- Postcode district: NN14
- Dialling code: 01933
- Police: Northamptonshire
- Fire: Northamptonshire
- Ambulance: East Midlands
- UK Parliament: Corby and East Northamptonshire

Ringstead is a village and civil parish in Northamptonshire, England, forming part of North Northamptonshire. It is located approximately 15 miles (24 km) north-east of Northampton. At the time of the 2011 census, the parish's population was 1,461 people. The local primary school is situated next to St Mary's Church, which is host to the Ringstead Flower Festival.

== History ==
The village's name means 'Ring place'. The meaning of the name here is obscure.

Ringstead was the birthplace of:

- William Tuttle, who settled in Charlestown, Massachusetts in 1636. His descendants number in the tens of thousands today. Notable among them are: Ernest Hemingway, Bob Newhart, Sinclair Lewis, Humphrey Bogart, Winston Churchill, Gerald Ford, Lester B. Pearson, Jonathan Edwards, O. Henry, Margaret Warner, Drew Gilpin Faust, Norman Rockwell & Annette Bening
- Alfred Roberts, the father of Margaret Thatcher.

According to tradition, the entrance to St Mary's churchyard has been haunted by the ghost of a village girl, Lydia Atley, who disappeared in 1850. What were thought to be her skeletal remains were unearthed in 1864 in a local orchard; the village butcher, Weekly Ball, was tried for Lydia's murder but acquitted because it proved impossible to conclusively identify the skeleton as that of the missing girl.

During the 1980s, major sand and gravel excavations took place all around Ringstead leaving many man-made lakes and islands.

In 2007, Ringstead, Hargrave, Raunds and Stanwick were legally united as "The 4 Spires Benefice", with each village retaining its own church.

== Heritage assets ==
The following buildings and structures are listed by Historic England as of special architectural or historic interest.

- Church of the Nativity of the Blessed Virgin Mary (Grade I) 12th century 52.36531°N 0.55323°W
- Slade Farmhouse (Grade II) 17th century 52.36340°N 0.54943°W
- Manor House (Grade II) 18th century 52.36504°N 0.55474°W
- 5, 7 and 9 Denford Road (Grade II) 18th century 52.36533°N 0.54956°W
- War memorial (Grade II) 20th century 52.36542°N 0.55344°W

== Demography ==
- In 1801 there were 454 persons
- In 1831 there were 620 persons
- In 1841 there were 640 persons
- In 2011 there were 1,461 persons

== Sport ==
=== Football ===
The village has a relatively successful sporting tradition in football. They have had a team representing the village for over 100 years since it was established in 1896. Ringstead Rangers includes a men's team, a men's reserve team, an under 17s, under 14s and an under 9s team. All the teams play their home matches at Ringstead Recreational Ground and their traditional strip colours consist of red and black. The teams have been known to sport various other strip colours, especially in their away strips, including orange, blue and pink.

=== Social club ===
Activities at the Village Social Club include pool; the team currently plays in Division 3 of the East Northamptonshire League. It also has a skittles team and facilities for darts, bingo and dominoes.

=== Water-related activities ===
The River Nene runs past the village in a series of locks. A National Lottery funded cycle, bridle and footpath track runs between Stanwick Lakes and Islip, the Nene Way running through the area all offering easy walking. Ringstead has a very large boating community and features over 250 river craft moored at Willy Watt Marina and Blackthorn Lake Marina.

== Nature reserve ==
Kinewell Lake is a local nature reserve and part of the Upper Nene Valley Gravel Pits Site of Special Scientific Interest, Ramsar wetland site of international importance and Special Protection Area under the European Communities Birds Directive.
