= Stanwick Lakes =

Country park in Northamptonshire, England

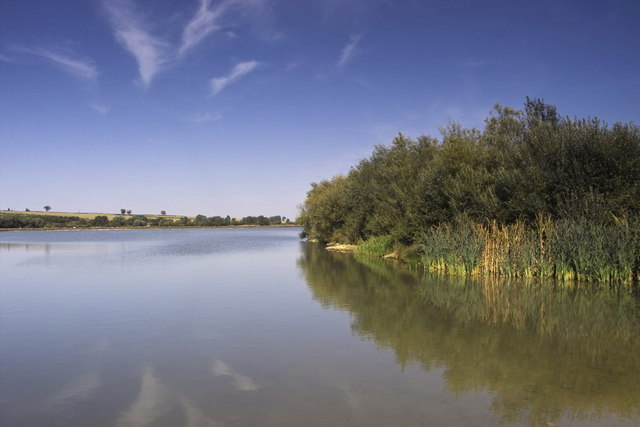

- Location within Northamptonshire
- Population: 0
- OS grid reference: SP967714
  - London: 60.3 miles (97.1 km)
- Unitary authority: North Northamptonshire
- Ceremonial county: Northamptonshire
- Region: East Midlands
- Country: England
- Sovereign state: United Kingdom
- Post town: Wellingborough
- Postcode district: NN9
- Dialling code: 01933
- Police: Northamptonshire
- Fire: Northamptonshire
- Ambulance: East Midlands
- UK Parliament: Corby and East Northamptonshire

Stanwick Lakes is a country park on the outskirts of the village of Stanwick, Northamptonshire, England. Opened in 2006, it is managed by the Rockingham Forest Trust on behalf of East Northamptonshire District Council and comprises 750 acres (304 hectares) of former gravel pits. It is part of the larger River Nene Regional Park.

== History ==
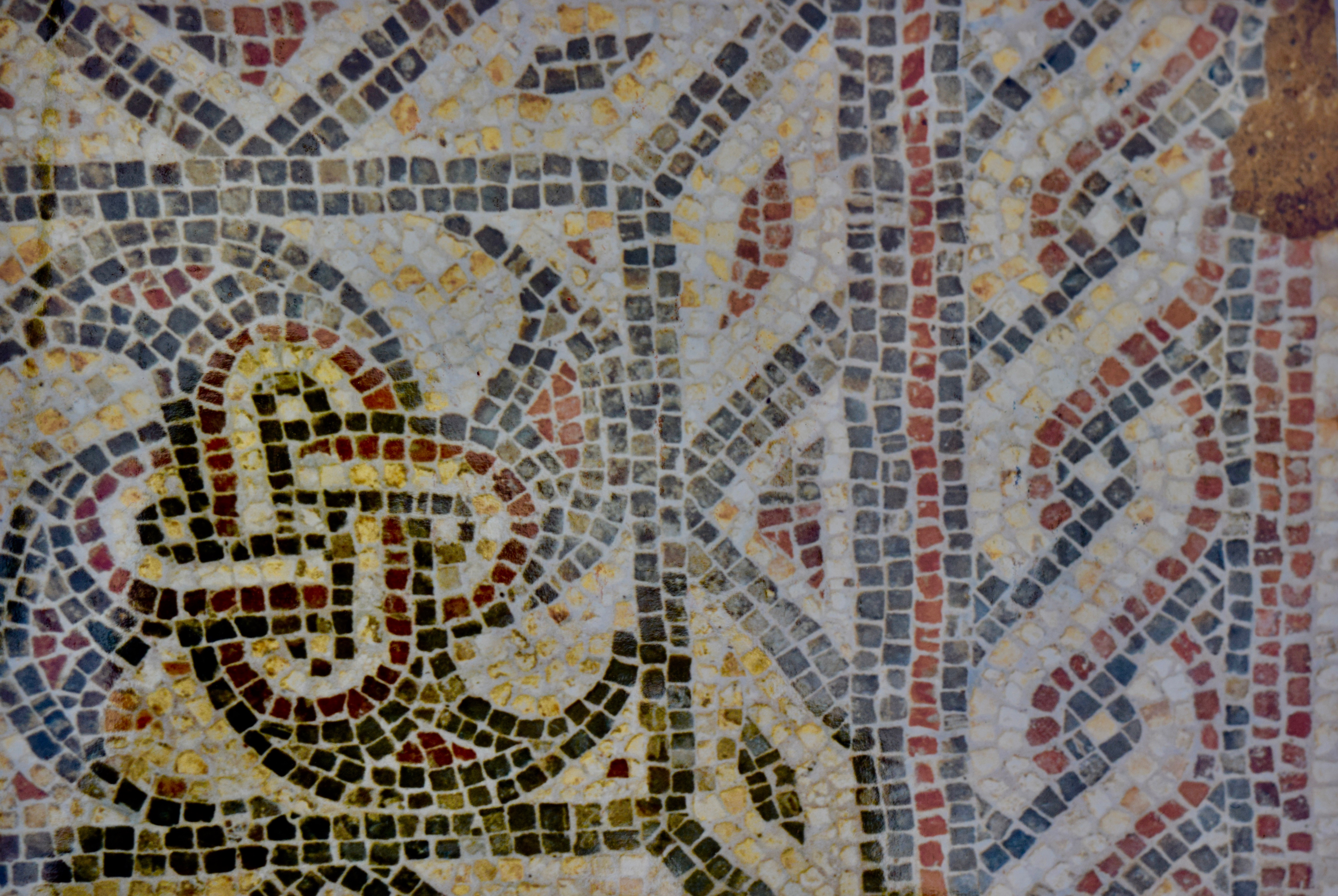
Roman mosaic Stanwick Lakes

Prior to the construction of a bypass and mass excavation of gravel, a Roman villa was excavated in 1984–1992 and several mosaics were found. In 2013, one of the mosaics was returned after study and is now on display in the Visitor Centre at Stanwick Lakes.

A medieval village was excavated in 1985-1989 near to the village of Ringstead. The earthworks and buried archaeological remains of the medieval village of West Cotton, including a mid-late Anglo-Saxon and medieval settlement abandoned before 1450. The settlement overlies the north end of an extensive prehistoric ceremonial complex.

== Geography ==
Stanwick Lakes is approximately 15 miles north-east of Northampton.

== Landmarks ==
The following buildings and structures are listed by Historic England as of special architectural or historic interest.

- Raunds bowl barrow (Scheduled Monument) Prehistoric 52.32712°N 0.58905°W
- Irthlingborough bowl barrow (Scheduled Monument) Prehistoric 52.3324°N 0.5823°W
- Medieval Settlement of West Cotton (Scheduled Monument) 52.3427°N 0.5691°W
