= Stanwick, Northamptonshire =

Village in North Northamptonshire, England

Stanwick
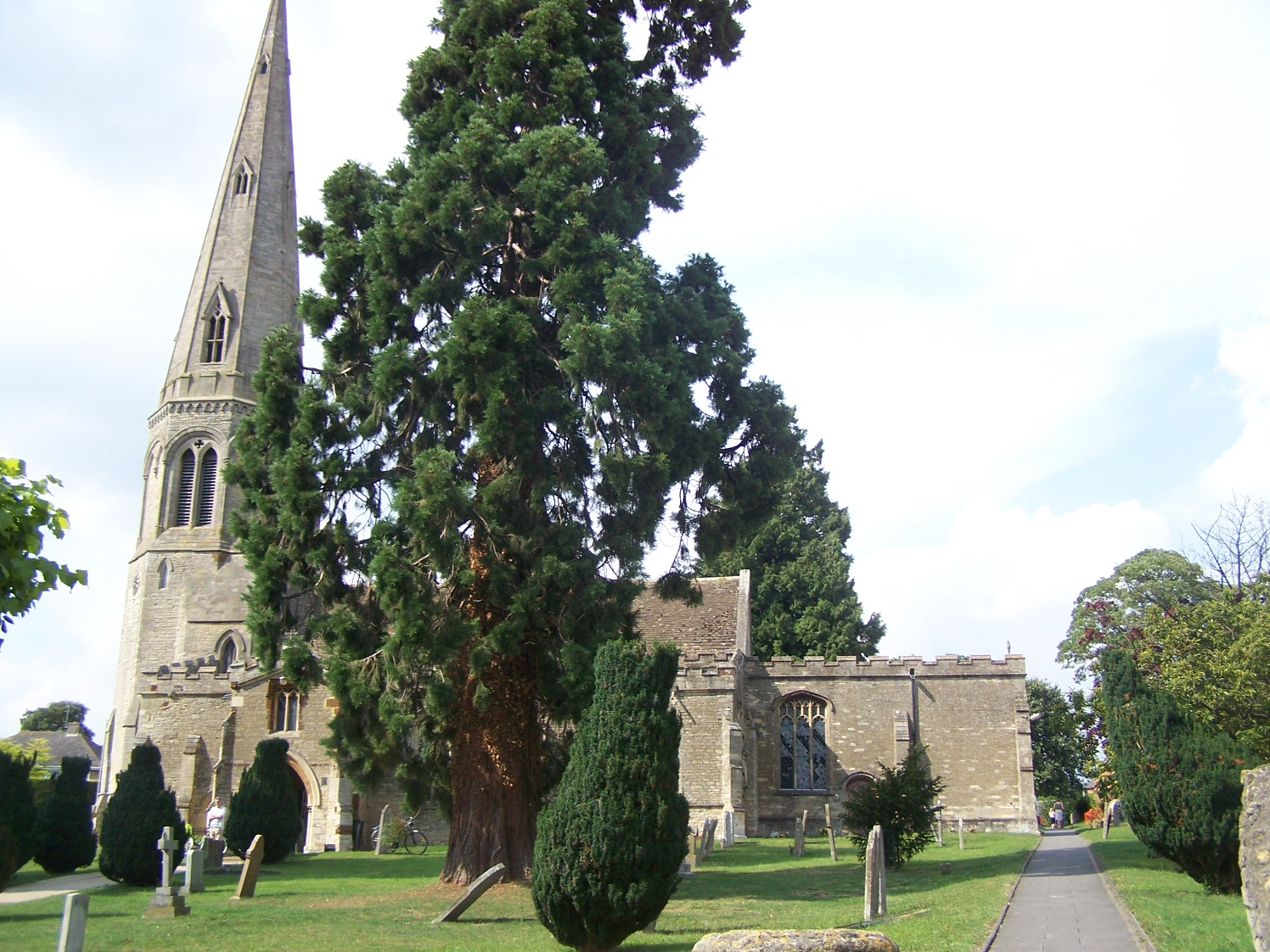
- St Laurence's Church

- Location within Northamptonshire
- Population: 1,942 (2011 census)
- OS grid reference: SP979713
  - London: 59.9 miles (96.5 km)
- Unitary authority: North Northamptonshire
- Ceremonial county: Northamptonshire
- Region: East Midlands
- Country: England
- Sovereign state: United Kingdom
- Post town: Wellingborough
- Postcode district: NN9
- Dialling code: 01933
- Police: Northamptonshire
- Fire: Northamptonshire
- Ambulance: East Midlands
- UK Parliament: Corby and East Northamptonshire

Stanwick (/ˈstænɪk/) is a village and civil parish in North Northamptonshire, England.

== Toponymy ==
The village's name origin is unclear. The first part of the village's name is clearly from Old English "stan", meaning "stone". The second part appears to be from Old English "wīc", meaning "village" (see -wick), but it may actually be from "wicga" meaning "insect/beetle" (as in "earwig"), likely used here in the feeling of something that wriggles or "tremors" (as with the name of Wigmore).

Over time, the pronunciation and spelling of the name has changed slightly.

- In the 10th century, it was referred to as "Stan Wigga".
- 1086 in the Domesday Book it is referred to as "Stanwige" and "Stanwica".
- 1137 in the Anglo-Saxon Chronicle it is referred to as "Stanwigga".
- 1668 on the funeral monument to John Atkins, Lord of the Manor, it is referred to as "Stanwigge".

== History ==
There has been a settlement at Stanwick since Roman times at the latest. A Roman villa was excavated in 1984–1992 and several mosaics were found prior to the construction of a bypass and mass excavation of gravel. In 2013, one of the mosaics was returned after study and is now on display in the Visitor Centre at Stanwick Lakes.

In 1086 the manor of Stanwick was held by Peterborough Abbey but by 1284 there appear to have been two manors.

In 2007, Stanwick, Hargrave, Raunds and Ringstead were legally united as "The 4 Spires Benefice", with each village retaining its own church.

On 29 June 2017 the Stanwick electorate voted on whether to adopt a local Neighbourhood Plan. With an above average turnout of 51.1%, 97.4% of those who voted, voted YES to adopt the plan. On 17 July 2017, East Northamptonshire Council made (adopted) the Stanwick Neighbourhood Plan; it is now a legal planning document that must be considered by the Local Planning Authority when appropriate planning applications are decided.

== Heritage assets ==
The following buildings and structures are listed by Historic England as of special architectural or historic interest.

- Raunds bowl barrow (Scheduled) Prehistoric 52.32712°N 0.58905°W
- Church of St Laurence (Grade I) 13th century 52.33245°N 0.56310°W
- Section of wall and attached churchyard cross socket (Grade II) 14th century 52.33202°N 0.56285°W
- 39 High Street (Grade II) 17th century 52.33090°N 0.56645°W
- Dovecote Close (originally Ivy cottage) (Grade II) 17th century 52.33004°N 0.56798°W
- Manor House (Grade II) 17th century 52.33166°N 0.56089°W
- Stanwick Hall (Grade II*) 18th century, with C17 or earlier cellars (rebuilt 1742) 52.33017°N 0.57016°W
- Old Rectory (Grade II*) 18th century 52.33258°N 0.56420°W
- Grange Farmhouse (Grade II) 18th century 52.33011°N 0.56140°W
- War Memorial (Grade II) 20th century 52.33213°N 0.56328°W

Whilst the following Heritage Assets are not listed with Historic England, they are of historical importance to the village.

- Georgian post box 52.33192°N 0.56333°W
- Duke of Wellington public house (rebuilt 1817) 52.33200°N 0.56262°W
- Various stone walls through the village (circa 1838)
- Old School Rooms (built 1839) 52.33186°N 0.56350°W
- Queen Victoria's Diamond Jubilee marker (1897) 52.33076°N 0.55699°W
- Red telephone box 52.33200°N 0.56355°W
- Queen Elizabeth II's Diamond Jubilee marker (2012) 52.33202°N 0.56350°W
- World War I Commemorative Plaque (2014) 52.33189°N 0.56350°W

Between 1960 and 1990 the village lost three important buildings.

- Stanwick House was demolished following a fire 52.33277°N 0.56493°W
- Hill House was demolished after it deteriorated structurally 52.33011°N 0.56522°W
- Stanwick Water Mill was demolished as it was surplus to requirements and gravel extraction was about to start in the area 52.33014°N 0.58167°W

== Geography ==
Nearby settlements include Raunds, Hargrave, Chelveston, Ringstead, Higham Ferrers, Rushden, Thrapston, Irthlingborough and Wellingborough. Stanwick is approximately 15 miles north-east of Northampton and is the largest village in the East Northamptonshire district.

== Demography ==
- In 1086 there were 17 households (Domesday)
- In 1801 there were 332 persons
- In 1811 there were 397 persons
- In 1821 there were 424 persons
- In 1831 there were 503 persons
- In 1841 there were 577 persons living in 113 households
- In 1851 there were 609 persons living in 134 households
- In 1870 there were 669 persons living in 147 households
- In 1901 there were 901 persons living in 214 households
- In 1911 there were 922 persons living in 212 households
- In 1981 there were 1,343 persons living in 530 households
- In 1991 there were 1,481 persons living in 575 households
- In 2001 there were 1,924 persons living in 733 households
- In 2011 there were 1,942 persons living in 754 households
- In 2021 there were 1,891 persons living in 754 households

Stanwick was the largest village population in the district of East Northamptonshire but it is now the tenth largest village population in North Northamptonshire; Weldon being the largest with a population of 6,809 according to the 2021 census. Stanwick was originally an independent parish, but was transferred from Thrapston Rural District to Raunds urban district in 1935, until April 2000, when Stanwick Parish Council was established.

== Education ==
Stanwick Primary School became an Academy in 2016. It is a mixed school for children aged from 4 to 11 years old and was awarded a Grade 2 (Good) rating by OfSTED in 2019. There is the Acorn Day Nursery for children aged from 4 months to 4 years old, that was rated Outstanding by OfSTED in 2022. There is also a non-profit Stanwick Pre-school Playgroup for children aged from 2 to 5 years old. that was rated Good by OfSTED in 2022.

== Amenities and events ==
The Duke of Wellington public house was formerly called the Cock Inn and was renamed The Duke of Wellington Inn, between 1817 and 1820 in honour of the Duke of Wellington following the Battle of Waterloo on 18 June 1815.

An annual fundraising event for St Laurence Church is organised by the Friends of Stanwick Church (FoSC) and includes the Toy's Zip-Line where children's brave toys slide down the zip line.

The Stanwick Races Event is held annually on Easter Monday and consists of a 10 km Road Race and a 2 km Fun Run. It is organised by volunteers from the village and the surrounding area. It includes participants from a number of countries in addition to semi-professionals and amateurs from the local area.

Services include Stanwick Club (a former Working Men's Club), the Duke of Wellington public house and a village shop incorporating the post office.

In 2006 Stanwick Lakes opened. It is a country park on the outskirts of the village, managed by the Rockingham Forest Trust in partnership with North Northamptonshire Council. It comprises 750 acres (304 hectares) of former gravel pits and is part of the larger River Nene Regional Park. Located in close proximity to the country park is a selection of fishing lakes.

In 2009 the Parish Council purchased 10 acres (4 hectares) of land, now called the "Parish Fields", at the eastern end of the village that, when fully developed, will include a pocket park, wildflower meadow, recreation area and allotments.

In 2011 a new village hall was built in the village near to the church, replacing the old "Shant" and former British Legion Hall.

In 2012 the post office moved across the High Street to the site of the Old School (established by a Trust Deed in 1839). In the refurbished building there is also an enlarged shop, a cafe and a bistro.
