= A43 road =

Road in England

Coordinates: 52.31156°N 0.81404°W

A43

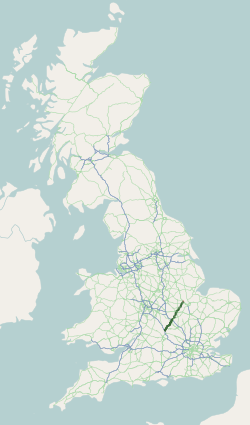

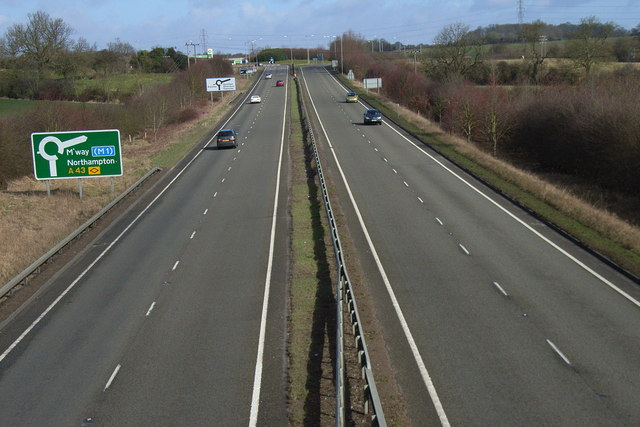
- A43 Brackley Bypass

Route information
- Length: 66.6 mi (107.2 km)

Major junctions
- South end: M40 near Ardley
- A5 in Towcester M1 / A45 near Northampton; A14 in Kettering A47 at Duddington
- North end: A1 near Stamford

Location
- Country: United Kingdom
- Counties: Oxfordshire; Northamptonshire; Cambridgeshire
- Primary destinations: Northampton; Kettering; Corby

Road network
- Roads in the United Kingdom; Motorways; A and B road zones
← A42	→ A44

The A43 is a primary route in the English Midlands and northern South East England, that runs from the M40 motorway near Ardley in Oxfordshire to Stamford in Lincolnshire. Through Northamptonshire it bypasses the towns of Northampton, Kettering and Corby which are the three principal destinations on the A43 route. The A43 also links to the M1 motorway.

The section of the road between the M40 and M1 is designated a trunk road, managed and maintained by National Highways. The remainder of the route is the responsibility of local authorities.

== Route of road ==
=== M40 to M1 ===
The A43 starts at M40 junction 10 (the location of Cherwell Valley Services) which is widely regarded as being one of the worst motorway junctions in the country despite improvements made in the early 2000s. There are sometimes tailbacks at the junction, even at off-peak times.

Following the junction with the M40, the A43 first meets a roundabout with the B4100 for traffic headed north-west for the village of Aynho or south for the town of Bicester. Continuing north, the A43 passes many Oxfordshire and Northamptonshire rural villages and towns before meeting the A421 which spurs towards Buckingham and later, Milton Keynes.

The stretch of A43 through south Northamptonshire was upgraded to dual carriageway standard between the M1 and Towcester in 1991 and through to the M40 in the early 2000s. This was primarily to provide a link from the M1 to the M40 and also to Silverstone, home of the British Grand Prix. During the Grand Prix the A43 is closed to through traffic between Brackley and Towcester.

The town of Brackley was bypassed in 1987. Just south of Brackley, drivers will approach a traffic island which spurs off in one direction for the A422 (for the M40 at Banbury and the A423 for motorists heading for Warwickshire) or the other direction which continues as the A43 into Northamptonshire. The A422 is met once again to the east of Brackley, allowing motorists an additional route into Buckinghamshire. Two miles north of Brackley, the B4525 (a B classified route for traffic from South Northamptonshire to reach the M40 at Banbury) joins the A43.

From here, the A43 leaves the Oxfordshire borders and continues in a north-easterly direction towards Silverstone, where the road joins the A413 at a grade-separated junction.

Later, the A43 bypasses Towcester, where it meets the A5 (Roman Watling Street) at a roundabout created when the road was built from Towcester in 1991. This roundabout was dangerously unsuited to the traffic volumes but was upgraded with traffic light controls during the first half of 2015. A flyover may need to be installed when the expansion of Towcester begins in 2018–2022. Continuing towards Northampton, it by-passes Blisworth and Milton Malsor villages, before reaching the M1 at junction 15A, at Rothersthorpe services. This stretch has four dangerous crossover junctions - one from Towcester via Old Towcester Road, two from Tiffield and one from Blisworth, unlike the rest of the route from the M40 where the junctions are either fully graded, as at Silverstone, or have roundabouts.

=== M1 to Corby ===
From M1 junction 15a the A43 runs concurrently southbound on the M1 to junction 15. It then follows the A45 Nene Valley Way up to the Lumbertubs Way Interchange. From here it splits from the A45 and continues via dual carriageway where it meets the Round Spinney roundabout. North of Northampton, it rejoins the old course of the A43 and passes through Moulton. A new 1.6 km dual carriageway bypass is currently being constructed which will link the Round Spinney roundabout with the existing road just north of the Moulton roundabout, which is due for completion in Spring 2018.

Following this, the road has a straight, rural stretch before reaching a roundabout at Broughton. After bypassing Broughton, it continues towards Kettering. It overlaps the A14 at its Junction 8, to bypass Kettering. At Junction 7 the A43 re-emerges on a new dual carriageway bypass. The old route of the A43 through Kettering town centre is still intact.

After bypassing Kettering, the road previously travelled through the historic village of Geddington. The old road is still regularly used, possibly due to poor signage or lack of SatNav updates. A new bypass, called the Corby Link Road, opened in 2014, from Barford Bridge on the A6003 to the A43 west of Stanion. Continuing from here, it passes the Euro-Hub site at Corby, and then it passes Corby and reaches several roundabouts.

=== Corby to Stamford ===
After bypassing Corby and Weldon, it heads out on a rural stretch, past Deene Park, and then bypassing Bulwick, the only village on this stretch. It passes some splendid woodland, and then heads towards Duddington.

Bypassing Duddington, it meets the A47. After 2.5 miles (4.0 km) it passes through Collyweston and Easton-on-the-Hill.

Then it meets the A1, before continuing towards Stamford. Previously, the A43 stopped at a junction with the Old A1 (Great North Road) in Stamford, but now that Stamford is bypassed, the A43 continues over the River Welland, until it reaches the A1175.

== History ==
The original (1923) route of the A43 was from the A42 (later the A34) at Kidlington to Stamford. After completion of the Oxford Ring Road, the southern terminus was changed to the Pear Tree Roundabout between Kidlington and Oxford. When the M40 was opened in 1991 the road from the Pear Tree Roundabout to Weston-on-the-Green was renumbered A34, and the stretch through Middleton Stoney between the A34 and junction 10 of the M40 was downgraded to the B430.

== Junction list ==
County	Location	mi	km	Destinations	Notes
Oxfordshire	Stoke Lyne–Ardley boundary	0.0	0.0	M40 – London, Newbury, Oxford, Birmingham, Stratford, Warwick, Banbury; B430 (Station Road) – Middleton Stoney, Ardley	Southern terminus; continues beyond M40 as B430; M40 junction 10
Oxfordshire	Tusmore	1.9– 3.0	3.1– 4.8	Croughton, Souldern, Hethe, Cottisford	Grade-separated junction
Northamptonshire	Evenly	4.1	6.6	A421 east / B4031 – Milton Keynes, Buckingham, Aynho, Tingewick, Finmere, Croughton	Western terminus of A421
Northamptonshire	Brackley	6.0	9.7	A422 west / Oxford Road – Banbury, Brackley, Farthinghoe, Middleton Cheney	Farthinghoe and Middleton Cheney signed northbound only; southern terminus of A422 concurrency
Northamptonshire	Brackley	6.8	10.9	A422 east / Buckingham Road – Buckingham, Brackley, Turweston, Westbury	Northern terminus of A422 concurrency
Northamptonshire	Syresham	10.1– 10.6	16.3– 17.1	B4525 – Banbury, Helmdon, Crowfield, Biddlesden, Syresham	Grade-separated junction; Biddlesden and Syresham signed northbound only
Northamptonshire	Syresham	11.0– 11.5	17.7– 18.5	Shalstone, Biddlesden, Syresham	Grade-separated junction; southbound exit and northbound entrance
Northamptonshire	Syresham–Silverstone boundary	12.9– 13.6	20.8– 21.9	A413 south – Stowe, Dadford, Abthorpe, Wood Burcote, Silverstone	Grade-separated junction; A413 and Wood Burcote signed northbound only, Silverstone southbound only; northern terminus of A413
Northamptonshire	Silverstone–Towcester boundary	16.0	25.7	A413 – Buckingham, Whittlebury	Grade-separated junction; southbound exit and northbound entrance
Northamptonshire	Towcester	17.9	28.8	A5 (Watling Street) / Towcester Road – Hinckley, Milton Keynes, Towcester, Weedon, Pattishall, Greens Norton	
Northamptonshire	Milton Malsor	23.5– 24.0	37.8– 38.6	M1 north (A45 west) to A5123 / M6 – The North, Birmingham, Northampton, Leicester, Sixfields	A5123 and Sixfields signed northbound only, Leicester southbound only; southern terminus of M1 / A45 concurrency; M1 junction 15A
Northamptonshire	Milton Malsor–Grange Park boundary	26.1– 26.4	42.0– 42.5	M1 south – London, Milton Keynes A508 south / Saxon Avenue – Stony Stratford, Grange Park	Northern terminus of M1 concurrency; southern terminus of A508 concurrency; M1 junction 15
Northamptonshire	Grange Park	26.8– 27.1	43.1– 43.6	Grange Park	Grade-separated junction; southbound exit and entrance
Northamptonshire	Wootton–East Hunsbury boundary	27.3– 27.6	43.9– 44.4	Collingtree Park, East Hunsbury, Wootton	Grade-separated junction; no southbound entrance
Northamptonshire	Northampton	28.1– 28.6	45.2– 46.0	Town centre (A508 north), Sixfields, Hunsbury, Hardingstone	Grade-separated junction; Town centre signed northbound only; northern terminus of A508 concurrency
Northamptonshire	Hardingstone–Northampton boundary	29.2– 29.9	47.0– 48.1	Brackmills	Grade-separated junction
Northamptonshire	Northampton	29.6– 30.4	47.6– 48.9	A428 – Town centre, Bedford, Brafield, Abington	Grade-separated junction
Northamptonshire	Northampton	31.5– 31.8	50.7– 51.2	A45 east to A605 / A14 – Wellingborough, Peterborough, Cambridge, Great Billing	To A605, A14, Peterborough and Cambridge signed northbound only, Great Billing southbound only; northern terminus of A45 concurrency
Northamptonshire	Northampton	32.3	52.0	A4500 – Town centre, Earls Barton, Weston Favell	Grade-separated junction; no southbound exit
Northamptonshire	Northampton	32.7	52.6	To A4500 – Town centre, Weston Favell, Earls Barton	Grade-separated junction; southbound exit and northbound entrance
Northamptonshire	Northampton	34.0	54.7	Talavera Way (A5076 to A508 / A45 – Market Harborough, Wellingborough, Kingsthorpe; Booth Rise (A5123 south-west) – Boothville, Kingsley	Kingsthorpe and Kingsley signed northbound only; north-eastern terminus of A5123
Northamptonshire	Cransley–Kettering boundary	43.6– 44.0	70.2– 70.8	A14 east to A6 – Felixstowe, Huntingdon, Bedford, Harwich A6013 east (Northampton Road) – Kettering	To A6 and Beford signed northbound only, A6013 and Harwich southbound only; southern terminus of A14 concurrency; western terminus of A6013; A14 junction 8
Northamptonshire	Thorpe Malsor–Kettering boundary	44.6– 45.0	71.8– 72.4	A14 west to M1 north / M6 / A6 – The Midlands, Market Harborough; Warren Hill (A4300 north-east) – Kettering	Northern terminus of A14 concurrency; south-western terminus of A4300; A14 junction 7
Northamptonshire	Kettering	46.4	74.7	A6003 south / A6183 east to A4300 – Kettering, Geddington	Southern terminus of A6003 concurrency; western terminus of A6183
Northamptonshire	Newton and Little Oakley	47.8	76.9	A6003 north / Newton Road – Corby, Rushton, Rockingham, Oakham, Newton	A6003, Corby, Rockingham and Oakham signed northbound only; northern terminus of A6003 concurrency
Northamptonshire	Stanion	51.9	83.5	A6116 south-east (Brigstock Road) / A4300 south-west (Stamford Road) / Long Croft Road to A14 – Stanion, Thrapston, Huntingdon, Geddington, Little Stanion	Southern terminus of A6116 concurrency; north-eastern terminus of A4300
Northamptonshire	Stanion	52.3	84.2	A6086 north (Geddington Road) – Corby, Oakham	Oakham signed northbound only; southern terminus of A6086
Northamptonshire	Corby–Weldon boundary	53.4	85.9	A427 west (Weldon Road) / Corby Road – Corby, Weldon, Market Harborough	Market Harborough signed southbound only; southern terminus of A427 concurrency
Northamptonshire	Corby	53.8	86.6	A6116 north-west / Arnsley Road to A6003 – Oakham	Northern terminus of A6116 concurrency
Northamptonshire	Weldon	54.8	88.2	A427 east (Stamford Road) / Levatts Way – Oundle, Benefield	Benefield signed southbound only; northern terminus of A427 concurrency
Northamptonshire	Duddington	63.1	101.5	A47 – Leicester, Peterborough, Tixover, Duddington, Wansford	Tixover and Duddington signed northbound only, Wansford southbound only
Cambridgeshire	Wothorpe	66.6	107.2	A1 north to A6121 / A16 – The North, Grantham, Stamford, Spalding; Kettering Road (A1175 east) – Stamford	Eastern terminus; western terminus of A1175; continues as A1175 beyond A1
1.000 mi = 1.609 km; 1.000 km = 0.621 mi: Concurrency terminus; Incomplete access
