= History of Northamptonshire =

Hundreds of historic Northamptonshire

The history of Northamptonshire spans the same period as English history.

== Prehistory ==
Much of Northamptonshire's countryside appears to have remained somewhat intractable with regards to early human occupation, resulting in an apparently sparse population and relatively few finds from the Palaeolithic, Mesolithic and Neolithic periods. In about 500 BC the Iron Age was introduced into the area by a continental people in the form of the Hallstatt culture, and over the next century a series of hill-forts were constructed at Arbury Camp, Rainsborough camp, Borough Hill, Castle Dykes, Guilsborough, Irthlingborough, and most notably of all, Hunsbury Hill. There are two more possible hill-forts at Arbury Hill (Badby) and Thenford.

== Roman occupation ==
In the 1st century BC, most of what later became Northamptonshire became part of the territory of the Catuvellauni, a Belgic tribe, the Northamptonshire area forming their most northerly possession. The Catuvellauni were in turn conquered by the Romans in 43 AD.

The Roman road of Watling Street passed through the county, and an important Roman settlement, Lactodorum, stood on the site of modern-day Towcester. There were other Roman settlements at Northampton, Kettering and along the Nene Valley near Raunds. A large fort was built at Longthorpe.

== Anglo-Saxons ==
After the Romans left, the area eventually became part of the Anglo-Saxon kingdom of Mercia, and Northampton functioned as an administrative centre. The Mercians converted to Christianity in 654 AD with the death of the pagan king Penda.

At some time in the 7th century the district which is now Northamptonshire suffered a simultaneous invasion by the West Saxons from the south and the Anglian tribes from the north. Relics discovered in the county testify to a mingling of people, at the same time showing that West Saxon influence never spread farther north than a line from Daventry to Warwick, and with the extension of the Mercian kingdom under Penda and the conversion of the midland districts ceased altogether.

Abbeys at Medehamstede (now Peterborough) and Pipewell were begun by Peada in 655, and at about the same time foundations were established at Peakirk, Weedon Beck, Castor and Oundle.

From about 889 the area was conquered by the Danes (as at one point almost all of England was, except for Athelney marsh in Somerset) and became part of the Danelaw – with Watling Street serving as the boundary – until being recaptured by the English under the Wessex king Edward the Elder, son of Alfred the Great, in 917. Northamptonshire was conquered again in 940, this time by the Vikings of York, who devastated the area, only for the county to be retaken by the English in 942. Consequently, it is one of the few counties in England to have both Saxon and Danish town-names and settlements.

The county was first recorded in the Anglo-Saxon Chronicle (1011), as Hamtunscire: the scire (shire) of Hamtun (the homestead). The "North" was added to distinguish Northampton from the other important Hamtun further south: Southampton – though the origins of the two names are in fact different.

As a shire Northamptonshire was probably of Danish origin, representing in the 10th century the area which owed allegiance to Northampton as a political and administrative centre. In 921 this area extended to the River Welland, the present northern limit of the county. In the 11th century Northamptonshire was included in Tostig's northern earldom; but in 1065, together with Huntingdonshire, it was detached from Northumbria and bestowed on Waltheof.

== Norman conquest and later middle ages ==
The only monastic foundation which survived the Conquest was Peterborough. At the time of the Domesday Survey the boundaries of Northamptonshire were approximately the same as the present day. Northamptonshire is first mentioned by name in the Historia Eliensis, in connection with events which occurred at the close of the 10th century. At the time of the Domesday survey the chief lay-tenant in Northamptonshire was Robert, earl of Mortain, whose fief escheated to the crown in 1106. The estates of William Peverel, founder of the Abbey of St James at Northampton, also escheated to the crown in the 12th century.

Norman castles existed at Rockingham, Barnwell, Lilbourne, Northampton and Higham Ferrers.

The Geld roll of the time of William I and the Domesday Survey of 1086 mention 28 hundreds in Northamptonshire, and part of Rutland is assessed under this county. By 1316 the divisions had undergone considerable changes, both in name and in extent, and had been reduced to their present number, 20, since which date they have remained practically unaltered. The names of the hundreds point to primitive meeting-places gradually superseded by villages and towns. For example, the court for Fawsley hundred met under a large beech tree in Fawsley Park until the beginning of the 18th century, when it was transferred to Everdon. The shire court originally met at Northampton.

Northamptonshire was originally included in the Diocese of Lincoln. The archdeaconry of Northampton is mentioned in the 12th century, and in 1291 included the deaneries of Peterborough, Northampton, Brackley, Oundle, Higham, Daventry, Preston, Weldon, Rothwell and Haddon.

Northampton was a favourite meeting-place of the councils and parliaments of the Norman and Plantagenet kings. In 1215 John was besieged in Northampton Castle by the barons, and in 1264, Henry III captured the castle from the younger Simon de Montfort.

== Wars of the Roses (15th century) ==
During the Wars of the Roses, Henry VI was defeated at Northampton in 1460.

== Tudors (16th century) ==
The Diocese of Peterborough was created in 1541.

== Civil War (17th century) ==
In the Civil War of the 17th century, the county declared almost unanimously for the parliament. Although a royalist garrison was placed at Towcester by Prince Rupert in 1644, it was almost immediately withdrawn.

== 19th century ==
In 1875, the archdeaconry of Oakham was formed and included in this county the first and second deaneries of Peterborough and the deaneries of Oundle, Weldon and Higham Ferrers. By 1900 the Northampton archdeaconry included the first, second and third deaneries of Brackwell and Rothwell, the first and second deaneries of Haddon and Preston, and the deaneries of Daventry, Northampton and Weldon.

== Country seats ==
Holdenby House was built by Sir Christopher Hatton, privy councillor to Queen Elizabeth, and Yardley Hastings was named from the Hastings, formerly earls of Pembroke. Higham Ferrers was the seat of the Ferrers family; Braybrook Castle was built by Robert of Braybrooke, a favourite of King John; and Burghley House gave the title of baron to William Cecil.

== Parliamentary representation ==
In 1290 Northamptonshire returned two members to parliament, and in 1295 Northampton also returned two members. In 1547 Brackley and Peterborough returned each two members, and in 1557 Higham Ferrers returned one member. Following the Reform Act 1832, the county returned four members in two divisions; both Brackley and Higham Ferrers were disfranchised.

== Economic history ==
The iron-mines and stone-quarries of Northamptonshire were worked in Roman times, but the former were entirely neglected from the Plantagenet period until their rediscovery in 1850, while the two most famous quarries, those of Barnack and Stanion, were exhausted about the 16th century. The wool and leather industries flourished in Norman times.

In the 17th century the weaving industry declined in the Northampton district, but flourished around Kettering. Other early industries were charcoal-burning, brick and tile manufacture and brewing. The industries of whip-making, pipe-making, silk-weaving and paper-making were introduced in the 17th and 18th centuries. Tanning was a flourishing industry, and provided the materials for shoemaking which became a principal industry in the county. Northamptonshire made boots for Oliver Cromwell's New Model Army, and the making of army boots continued to be an important feature of the economy until the 20th century, as well as boots and shoes of other kinds.

== Relics ==
Although Northamptonshire was rich in monastic foundations, remains, except of the abbey-church of Peterborough, afterwards the cathedral, are of small importance. At Geddington, and also at Hardingstone, near Northampton, there is an Eleanor cross, erected by Edward I to the memory of his queen, in good preservation.

For the architecture of its churches, Northampton holds a place scarcely inferior to any other English county. To the Saxon period belong the tower of Earls Barton church, which stands on what is probably the mound of an old English strong-house; the tower and other portions at Brigstock; the ground plan and other portions at Wittering; the remarkable tower at Barnack; and Brixworth church, constructed in part of Roman materials, and by some believed to include part of a Roman basilica.

Of Norman, besides the cathedral of Peterborough, the finest examples are St Peter's and St Sepulchre's, Northampton, and the tower of Castor church. St Mary's church, Higham Ferrers, formerly collegiate, Early English and Decorated, is one of the finest churches in the county, and, as specially noteworthy among many beautiful buildings, there may be mentioned the churches at Irthlingborough and Lowick, with their lantern towers, Warmington, a very fine specimen of Early English work, Rushden, Finedon, Raunds and Fotheringhay.

Philip Porter Thomas Percy, author of the Percy's Reliques, and afterwards Bishop of Dromore, was rector of the church at Easton Maudit.

A gateway at Rockingham, leading to the castle, which is still lived in, and earth-works at Higham Ferrers and Brackley are worthy of mention. Only a large mound and visible earthworks remain of the castle at Fotheringhay, famous as the scene of the imprisonment, trial and execution of Mary, Queen of Scots. Part of the house which was the birthplace of Richard III still stands and is now a private dwelling.

Barnwell Castle, founded by William the Conqueror, an interesting example of the defensive construction of the period, is still a fine ruin, which includes four of the round towers and an imposing gateway.

Holdenby Manor House, where Sir Christopher Hatton (1540–1591) was born, and where Charles I was staying when he was carried away by Cornet Joyce, is largely restored.

Among ancient mansions are Castle Ashby, the seat of the Comptons, the oldest portion belonging to the reign of Henry VIII; Althorp, the seat of the Spencers, of various dates; Drayton House, of the time of Henry VI; the vast pile of Burghley House, Stamford, founded by Lord Burghley (1553), but more than once altered and enlarged; Kirby Hall, a beautiful Elizabethan building once the residence of Sir Christopher Hatton; and Lilford Hall a fine example of a Jacobean mansion.
