= Henry Burgess (cricketer) =

English cricketer

Personal information
- Full name: Henry Burgess
- Born: 5 May 1879; Carlton Curlieu, Leicestershire, England
- Died: 16 April 1964 (aged 84); Middleton, Northamptonshire, England
- Batting: Right-handed
- Bowling: Right-arm fast
- Relatives: John Burgess (brother); Robert Fetherstonhaugh (nephew)

Domestic team information
- Years: Team
- 1905: Northamptonshire
- 1900–1902: Leicestershire

Career statistics
Competition	First-class
Matches	9
Runs scored	63
Batting average	5.25
100s/50s	–/–
Top score	20
Balls bowled	900
Wickets	11
Bowling average	50.54
5 wickets in innings	–
10 wickets in match	–
Best bowling	3/106
Catches/stumpings	4/–
- Source: Cricinfo, 19 January 2013

Henry Burgess (5 May 1879 – 16 April 1964) was an English cricketer. Burgess was a right-handed batsman who bowled right-arm fast. He was born at Carlton Curlieu, Leicestershire.

Burgess made his first-class debut for Leicestershire against Essex at the County Ground, Leyton in the 1900 County Championship. He made seven further first-class appearances for the county, the last of which came against Surrey at Aylestone Road, Leicester in the 1902 County Championship. In his eight first-class matches for Leicestershire, he took 11 wickets at an average of 47.63, with best figures of 3/106. A tailend batsman, he scored a total of 53 runs at a batting average of 5.30, with a high score of 20. He later made a single first-class appearance for Northamptonshire in the 1905 County Championship against Sussex at the County Ground, Northampton.

He died at Middleton, Northamptonshire on 16 April 1964. His brother John Burgess and nephew Robert Fetherstonhaugh both played first-class cricket.
