= Little Stanion =

Village in Northamptonshire, England

Coordinates: 52.4755°N 0.6711°W

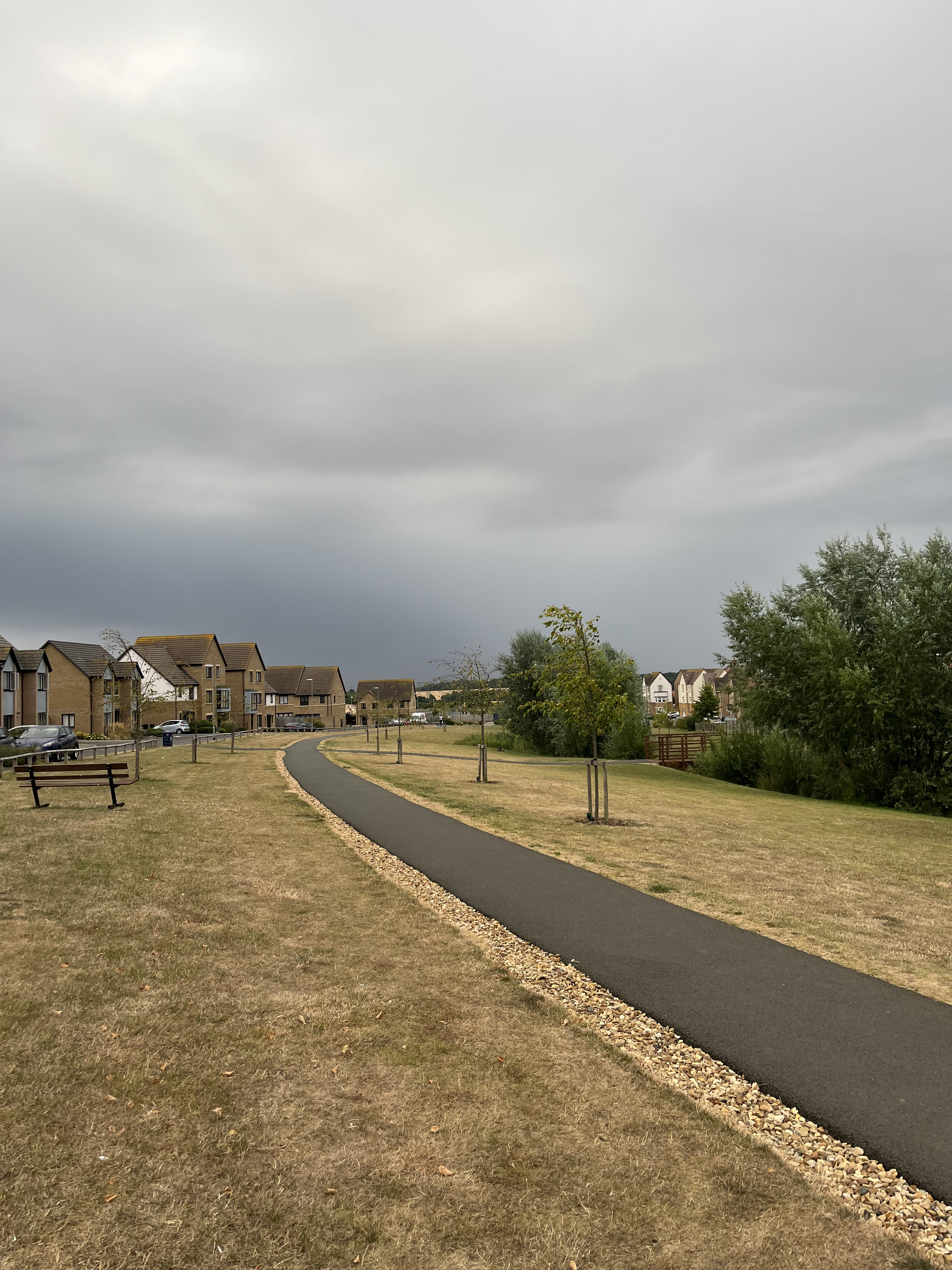
- Little Stanion Green Space Summer 2022

- Location within Northamptonshire
- Civil parish: Little Stanion
- Unitary authority: North Northamptonshire
- Ceremonial county: Northamptonshire
- Region: East Midlands
- Country: England
- Sovereign state: United Kingdom

Little Stanion is an estate which is more commonly referred to as a village, in the North Northamptonshire district of Northamptonshire on the edge of Rockingham Forest, 1.1 miles (1.82 km) southeast from the centre of Corby and 7 miles from Kettering.

It is a housing estate which, as of October 2016, has 733 completed houses with current plans to build up to 970. The first houses were completed in 2008. The estate neighbours Stanion, Brigstock and Geddington and although can be found under a Corby postcode it is deemed to be its own village.

Little Stanion already has some 37 acres of completed parkland, with a network of 3.5 km of paths, an outdoor gym area, two children’s play parks, and a much sought after primary school.

Little Stanion Primary School is a one-form entry school which opened in 2012. The school was assessed as “Good” by Ofsted in October 2015.

Little Stanion is privately owned and managed by Little Stanion Farm Management Company.

The estate is within the parish of Little Stanion, a new independent parish was established for the village on 1 April 2018.

The Little Stanion Village Association (LSVA) was established in 2011 to ensure that residents of the village had a central point to receive information, share their views and have their questions answered. LSVA has been very active since its inception arranging a number of community events and working closely with local organisations to promote the new village and protect its interests.

There is just a single access route to the village from the A43/A6116 roundabout.
