= Welland Wanderer =

Bus services in Northamptonshire, England

Overview
- Operator: Lawson's of Corby
- Began service: 9 November 2018

Welland Wanderer is a pair of bus services in Northamptonshire, UK.

== History ==
The service was introduced on 9 November 2018 as a replacement for the number 67, which was withdrawn in May.

The service was suspended from 1 March 2020 due to low usage as a result of the COVID-19 pandemic. In July 2020, Kettering Borough Council agreed funding of £2,600 which would allow the service to continue for two years. The service resumed on 4 August 2020.

== Service ==
The service is funded by both Kettering and Corby councils. There is one return service on Fridays from Stoke Albany to Corby and one return service on Tuesdays from Gretton to Market Harborough. It is operated by Lawson's of Corby.

Route	Start	Via	End
East	Stoke Albany	Wilbarston, East Carlton, Middleton, Cottingham, Rockingham, Gretton	Corby
West	Gretton	Rockingham, Cottingham, Middleton, East Carlton, Wilbarston, Stoke Albany, Ashley, Weston by Welland, Sutton Bassett	Market Harborough
