= John Burgess (cricketer, born 1880) =

English cricketer

Personal information
- Full name: John Burgess
- Born: 22 November 1880; Carlton Curlieu, Leicestershire, England
- Died: 2 November 1952 (aged 71); East Carlton, Northamptonshire, England
- Batting: Right-handed
- Role: Wicket-keeper
- Relatives: Henry Burgess (brother); Robert Fetherstonhaugh (nephew)

Domestic team information
- Years: Team
- 1902–1913: Leicestershire

Career statistics
Competition	First-class
Matches	12
Runs scored	230
Batting average	12.77
100s/50s	–/–
Top score	39
Balls bowled	–
Wickets	–
Bowling average	–
5 wickets in innings	–
10 wickets in match	–
Best bowling	–
Catches/stumpings	7/2
- Source: Cricinfo, 19 January 2013

John Burgess (22 November 1880 – 2 November 1953) was an English cricketer. Burgess was a right-handed batsman who played as a wicket-keeper. He was born at Carlton Curlieu, Leicestershire.

Burgess made his first-class debut for Leicestershire against Worcestershire at Aylestone Road, Leicester in the 1902 County Championship, with him making five further appearances in that season. His next appearance for the county in first-class cricket came in 1908, with two appearances that season, before making a single appearance in the 1911 County Championship and two appearances in the 1913 County Championship, the second of which saw Kent play Leicestershire at the St Lawrence Ground, Canterbury. In his twelve first-class matches for Leicestershire, he scored a total of 230 runs at an average of 12.77, with a high score of 39. Behind the stumps he took seven catches and made two stumpings.

He died at East Carlton, Northamptonshire on 2 November 1953. His brother Henry Burgess and nephew Robert Fetherstonhaugh both played first-class cricket.
