= Little Oakley =

Little Oakley may refer to:

- Little Oakley, Essex
- Little Oakley, Northamptonshire
