= Upper Benefield =

Coordinates: 52.4927°N 0.5594°W

- Location within Northamptonshire
- OS grid reference: SP979892
- Unitary authority: North Northamptonshire
- Ceremonial county: Northamptonshire
- Region: East Midlands
- Country: England
- Sovereign state: United Kingdom
- Post town: Peterborough
- Postcode district: PE8
- Dialling code: 01832
- Police: Northamptonshire
- Fire: Northamptonshire
- Ambulance: East Midlands
- UK Parliament: Corby and East Northamptonshire

Upper Benefield is a linear village along the A427 road in the North Northamptonshire district of Northamptonshire, England. It is part of the civil parish of Benefield. It is around 10 km (6 miles) east of Corby.

The village's name means 'Bera's people's open land'.
