= Hemington =

Hemington may refer to:

- Hemington, Leicestershire
- Hemington, Northamptonshire
- Hemington, Somerset
