= A6003 road =

Road in England

A6003

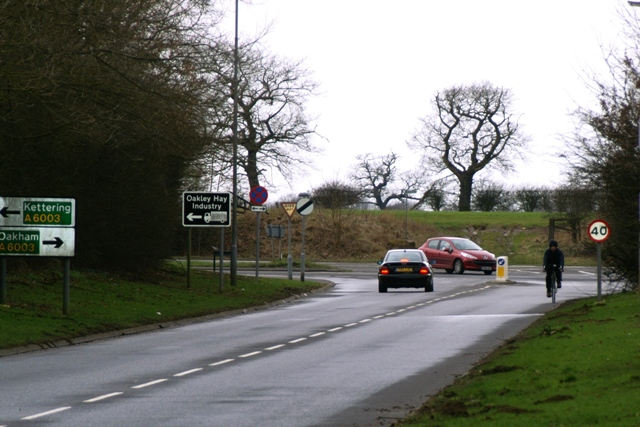
- Junction of Danesholme Road and A6003

Route information
- Length: 21 mi (34 km)

Major junctions
- South end: A14 road near Kettering; 52.3752°N 0.6835°W
- A6; A14 → Junction 10 A6098 A509 A6900 A4300 A6013; A43 A6183 A6014 A427 A6116; A47 A606
- North end: Oakham; 52.6672°N 0.7134°W

Location
- Country: United Kingdom
- Primary destinations: Kettering, Corby, Uppingham, Oakham

Road network
- Roads in the United Kingdom; Motorways; A and B road zones
| ← A6002 | → A6004 |

The A6003 links Kettering and Corby in Northamptonshire, with Oakham in Rutland, via Leicestershire. The road forms the principal link between Rutland and Northamptonshire.

== Route ==
The road starts at junction 10 of the A14, heading past Wicksteed Park and into Kettering. Through the town it is a single carriageway until crossing the A43 at a signal- controlled roundabout. From here it passes an industrial development and heads north towards Corby. The stretch between the A43 and the A6014 road in Corby is the only length of dual carriageway on the route. A bypass has been constructed from Barford Bridge on the A6003 to the A43 west of Stanion to relieve the traffic on the single carriageway passing through Geddington on the A43. Skirting the edge of Corby, the road passes the Eyebrook Reservoir before crossing the River Welland; the narrow bridge over the Welland at Caldecott is controlled by traffic lights. It passes through Uppingham before meeting the A47 at a roundabout . North of here it passes Rutland Water before arriving at Oakham, where a new bypass has been constructed.
