= Benefield Castle =

Castle in Lower Benefield, Northamptonshire, England

- Lower Benefield, Northamptonshire, England

Site information
- Type: Castle
- Condition: Earthworks

Location
- Shown within Northamptonshire
- Coordinates: 52°29′4.56″N 0°32′52.69″W

Benefield Castle was sited in the village of Lower Benefield, between the towns of Corby and Oundle in Northamptonshire at grid reference SP987884.

== Early history ==
Benefield Castle is classed as a ring work, and is thought to have been constructed during the twelfth century. Ringworks were Anglo Saxon medieval fortifications consisting of some buildings surrounded a large ditch and surmounted by a timber palisade or a stone wall. The exact date of the construction is not known, records however show that the castle is mentioned by name in documents dating to the thirteenth century. It may have one of the many fortifications created during the anarchy during the reign of King Stephen (1138–44). The castle was seized by King John in 1208, as the owner Hugh de Lisurs had failed to pay his debts. Henry III issued an order of restraint to his knights on 15 May 1264, after Battle of Lewes, stating that he had come to terms with the barons so they must be peaceful during their stay. An incident is recorded for the following year that men of Edward, the future king of England, who were housed at the castle attacked Biggin Manor and then crossed the river to loot cattle belonging to Oundle, however they were repulsed and a counterattack allowed the owners to recover many of their cattle. Soon after this incident the castle was pulled down, so in documents of 1298 it is mentioned as "an old castle", by the year 1315, there were no buildings that remained standing so documents show that only the site of the castle is mentioned, and none of its buildings. The site is mentioned again as a ruin in 1378. John Leyland mentions the ruins in 1535 as '"the diche and mines of an old castelle" (the ditch and mines of an old castle). Bridges mentions that a part of the wall was standing in 1724, surrounding around an acre of land. The manor house appears to have survived long after the castle was pulled down and is mentioned by Bridges in 1445. By the mid eighteenth century the only structure that remained was a stone wall, while maps created during the nineteenth century show that the main gatehouse, the entrance of the castle was on its eastern side, facing the manor farm.

== Remains today ==
Today only some of the earthworks are visible on the high ground on a natural spur on the western side of Lower Benefield. Archaeological evidence has suggested the evidence of buildings, both domestic and defensive, and a large platform on which they were constructed, the platform had rounded corners, and measured around 60 m × 50 m (200 ft × 160 ft), and was 2 m (6 ft 7 in) high. The large ditch, which was a common feature of such fortifications, survives and measures up to 10 m (33 ft) wide and 3 m (9.8 ft) deep, however its southern part has been infilled.
