= Thurning =

Thurning could be

- Thurning, Norfolk
- Thurning, Northamptonshire
