= Newton, Northamptonshire =

Village in Northamptonshire, England

Coordinates: 52.4416°N 0.7050°W

Newton
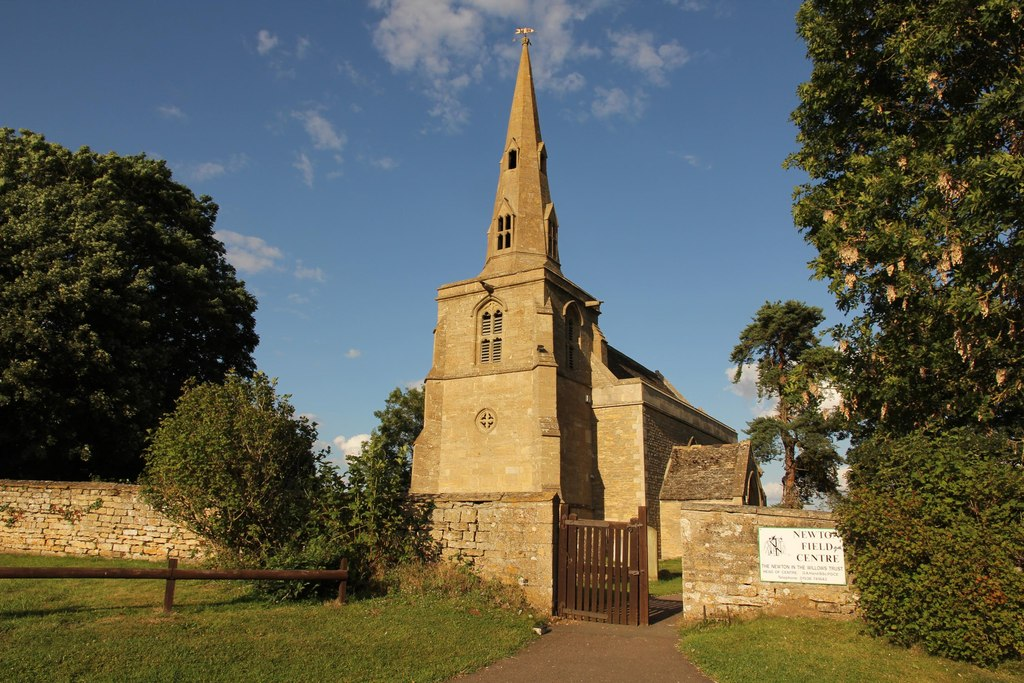
- St Faith's Church (when Newton Field Centre)

- Location within Northamptonshire
- Population: 126 (2011)
- OS grid reference: SP881834
- Civil parish: Newton and Little Oakley
- Unitary authority: North Northamptonshire
- Ceremonial county: Northamptonshire
- Region: East Midlands
- Country: England
- Sovereign state: United Kingdom
- Post town: Kettering
- Postcode district: NN14
- Dialling code: 01536
- Police: Northamptonshire
- Fire: Northamptonshire
- Ambulance: East Midlands
- UK Parliament: Kettering

Newton, sometimes called Newton in the Willows, is a small village and former civil parish, now in the parish of Newton and Little Oakley, in the North Northamptonshire district, in the ceremonial county of Northamptonshire, England. The village is in the Ise valley. Newton and Little Oakley had a population at the 2001 census of 147, decreasing to 126 at the 2011 Census. It has a combined parish council with Geddington.

The villages name means 'New farm/settlement'.

The Grade II* listed parish church of St Faith in Newton is now deconsecrated. It is largely 14th century, with a 15th-century tower and chancel of 1858 by William Slater. The novelist J. L. Carr fought to prevent the redundancy of the church. The church building was run as Newton Field Centre, an educational centre primarily concerned with the promotion of environmental understanding through field studies, but closed in 2018. The Newton-in-the-Willows Trust, a registered charity which has owned the building since 1974, decided to sell the property. In 2023, a planning application was approved for conversion to a house.

A dovecote, northeast of the church, is a Grade I listed building; it is described as an "outstanding dovecote, exhibiting craftsmanship of the highest quality". It was associated with a mansion of the Tresham family.

In 1607, Newton was the site of the suppression of the Midland Revolt, a peasants' revolt against enclosure; at least 46 rebels were killed. A memorial has been erected by the church where prisoners were held.

== Civil parish ==
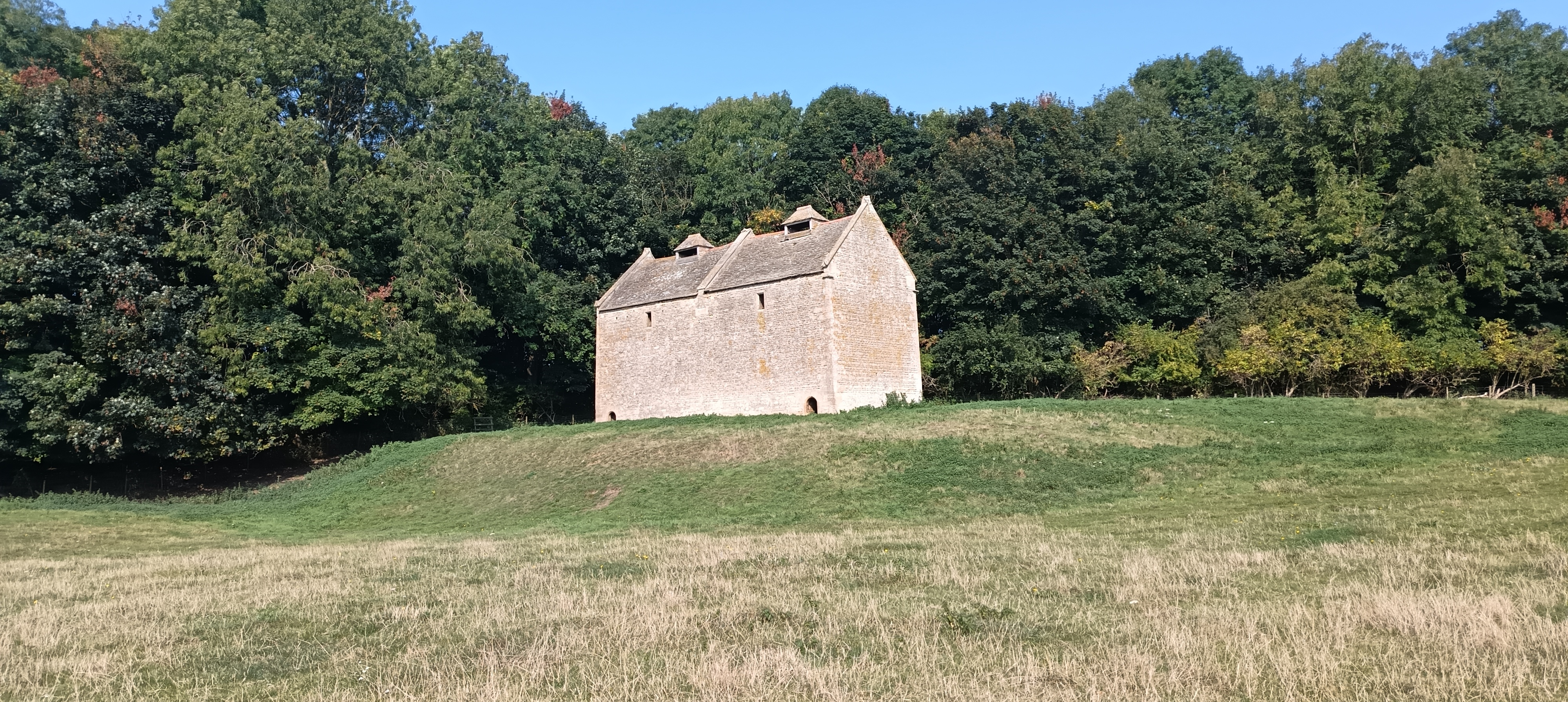
Newton Dovecote

On 1 April 1967, Little Oakley was transferred to Newton when the parish of Oakley was abolished. On 1 September 1996, the new parish was renamed to "Newton & Little Oakley". In 1961 the parish of Newton (prior to the merger) had a population of 96.
