= Robert Fetherstonhaugh =

English cricketer

Personal information
- Full name: Charles Bateman Robert Fetherstonhaugh
- Born: 17 November 1932; Tavistock, Devon, England
- Died: 29 September 2025 (aged 92); Andorra
- Batting: Right-handed
- Role: Wicket-keeper
- Relatives: Henry Burgess (uncle); John Burgess (uncle)

Domestic team information
- Years: Team
- 1956: Marylebone Cricket Club
- 1953–1963: Devon

Career statistics
Competition	First-class
Matches	4
Runs scored	59
Batting average	9.83
100s/50s	–/–
Top score	20*
Balls bowled	–
Wickets	–
Bowling average	–
5 wickets in innings	–
10 wickets in match	–
Best bowling	–
Catches/stumpings	4/1
- Source: Cricinfo, 16 February 2011

Charles Bateman Robert Fetherstonhaugh (17 November 1932 – 29 September 2025) was an English cricketer. Fetherstonhaugh was a right-handed batsman and a wicket-keeper. He was born in Tavistock, Devon and educated at Bradfield College, Berkshire.

Fetherstonhaugh made his Minor Counties Championship debut for Devon against Oxfordshire in 1953. From 1953 to 1963, he represented the county in 31 Championship matches, the last of which came against Berkshire. In 1956, he played his only first-class match for the Marylebone Cricket Club against Ireland. He later played three first-class matches for the Free Foresters between 1962 and 1964, with his appearances coming twice against Oxford University and once against Cambridge University. In total Fetherstonhaugh played four first-class matches, in which he scored 59 runs at a batting average of 9.83, with a high score of 20*. Behind the stumps he took 4 catches and made a single stumping.

His uncle, Henry, played first-class cricket for Leicestershire and Northamptonshire. Another uncle, John, played first-class cricket for Leicestershire.

Fetherstonhaugh died on 29 September 2025, aged 92.
