= Broughton, Northamptonshire =

Village in Northamptonshire, England

Coordinates: 52.3712°N 0.7750°W

Broughton
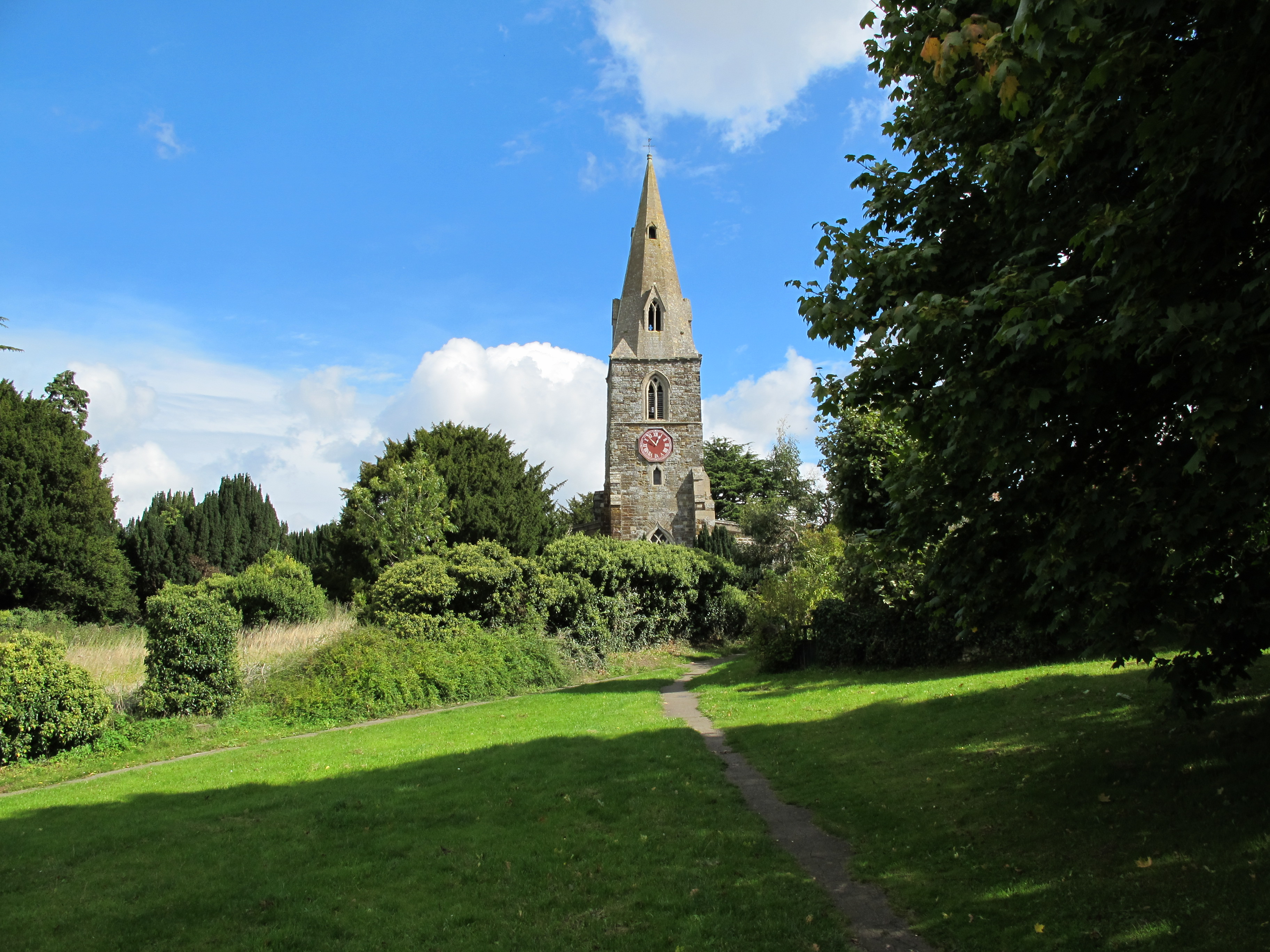
- The broach spire of Broughton church

- Location within Northamptonshire
- Population: 2,208 (2011)
- OS grid reference: SP8375
- Civil parish: Broughton
- Unitary authority: North Northamptonshire
- Ceremonial county: Northamptonshire
- Region: East Midlands
- Country: England
- Sovereign state: United Kingdom
- Post town: KETTERING
- Postcode district: NN14
- Dialling code: 01536
- Police: Northamptonshire
- Fire: Northamptonshire
- Ambulance: East Midlands
- UK Parliament: Kettering

Broughton is a large village and civil parish in North Northamptonshire, England. The village is around 2 miles (3.2 km) south-west of Kettering and is bypassed by the A43 road. At the 2011 census, the population of the parish was 2,208.

The village's name is derived from Old English meaning "fortification farm/settlement" or, perhaps, "brook farm/settlement".

Broughton appears in the Domesday Book of 1086 as Burtone. The church (St. Andrew), which is mostly early 14th century (although the chancel was actually rebuilt in 1828), incorporates part of a (12th century) Norman aisleless church at the south-west angle, including the reset south doorway with colonettes, scallop capitals and zigzags. The village has some notable Jacobean houses.

Broughton currently has one pub, The Red Lion; it used to also have The Sun but that closed. A protest to keep the pub running was fought for by driving a tank to Kettering Borough Council offices but no appeal has been won. The village also has three shops. It used to have a separate post office; that is now part of one of the shops. Many years ago, it had a cinema, five bakers, 7 pubs, 6 shops, a petrol station, and a butcher.

== Tin Can Band ==
An ancient custom or ritual, which still exists in the village, is that of the "Tin Can Band". It is held annually in mid-December, when, at midnight, a group of people walk around the village making as much noise as possible by banging on tin cans (anything from cans to pots, pans and metal dustbins). Various reasons have been suggested for the custom, including scaring away evil spirits just before Christmas, or (less charitably) that was a kind of "rough music" to drive out gypsies. Nowadays it's quite good-natured, but in the past there have been riotous scenes, especially in years when the authorities tried to prevent it happening. It doesn't happen as regularly or noticeably anymore, but most people in Broughton participate in some way.
