= Lower Benefield =

Village in Northamptonshire, England

Coordinates: 52.4866°N 0.5436°W

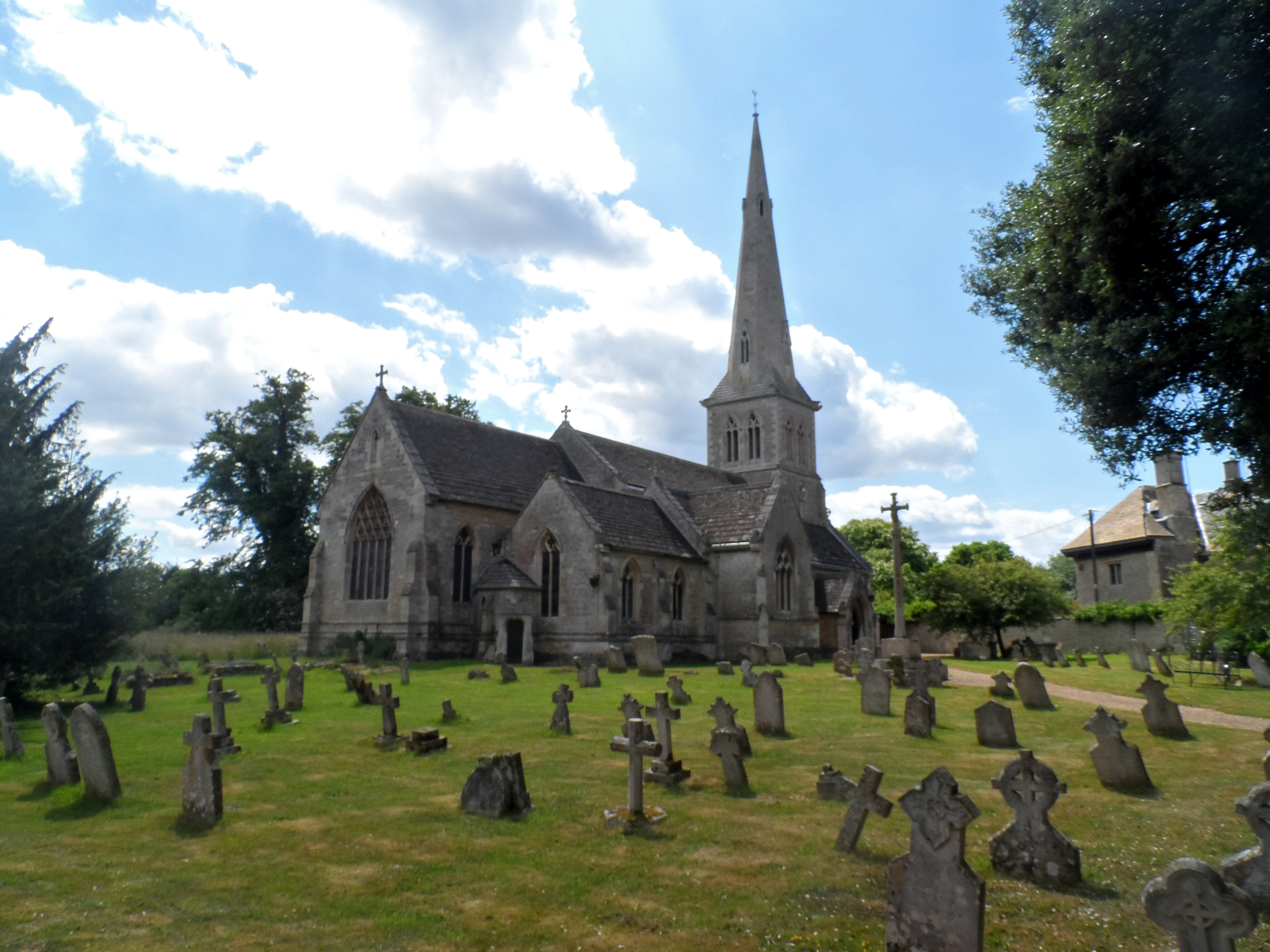
- St Mary's Church

- Location within Northamptonshire
- OS grid reference: SP989886
- Unitary authority: North Northamptonshire
- Ceremonial county: Northamptonshire
- Region: East Midlands
- Country: England
- Sovereign state: United Kingdom
- Post town: Peterborough
- Postcode district: PE8
- Dialling code: 01832
- Police: Northamptonshire
- Fire: Northamptonshire
- Ambulance: East Midlands
- UK Parliament: Corby and East Northamptonshire

Lower Benefield is a village on the A427 road in North Northamptonshire, England, near Oundle. It is part of the civil parish of Benefield.

The villages name means 'Open land of Bera's people'.

St Mary's Church is part of the Benefice of Benefield, Glapthorn and Oundle St Peter's. It is in the Rural Deanery of Oundle and is part of the Archdeaconry of Oakham within the Diocese of Peterborough. The church is a Grade II* listed building. It has Medieval origins but was largely rebuilt c.1847 by John Macduff Derick for the Watts-Russell family of Biggin Hall, about 1.5 miles (2.4 km) west of Benefield, and restored in 1897 and 1901. Only the chancel of the old church was retained, dating from the 14th-century.
