= Stan Leadbetter =

English cricketer

Personal information
- Full name: Stanley Austin Leadbetter
- Born: 22 May 1937; Stanion, Northamptonshire, England
- Died: 13 December 2013 (aged 76); Kettering, Northamptonshire, England
- Batting: Right-handed
- Bowling: Right-arm medium

Career statistics
| Competition | First-class |
|---|---|
| Matches | 3 |
| Runs scored | 112 |
| Batting average | 22.40 |
| 100s/50s | –/– |
| Top score | 46 |
| Balls bowled | 18 |
| Wickets | 0 |
| Bowling average | – |
| 5 wickets in innings | – |
| 10 wickets in match | – |
| Best bowling | – |
| Catches/stumpings | –/– |
- Source: Cricinfo, 19 March 2019

Stanley 'Stan' Austin Leadbetter (22 May 1937 – 13 December 2013) was an English first-class cricketer.

While undertaking his national service as a non-commissioned officer in the Royal Air Force, Leadbetter made his debut in first-class cricket for the Combined Services cricket team against Warwickshire at Edgbaston in 1956. He made two further first-class appearances the following year, against Surrey and Warwickshire. He scored a total of 112 runs across his three first-class matches, averaging 22.40, with a high score of 46. He featured regularly for the Northamptonshire Second XI from 1953–1958, but did not feature for the first team.

He died at Kettering in December 2013.
