= Benefield =

Civil parish in Northamptonshire, England

Coordinates: 52.4900°N 0.5508°W

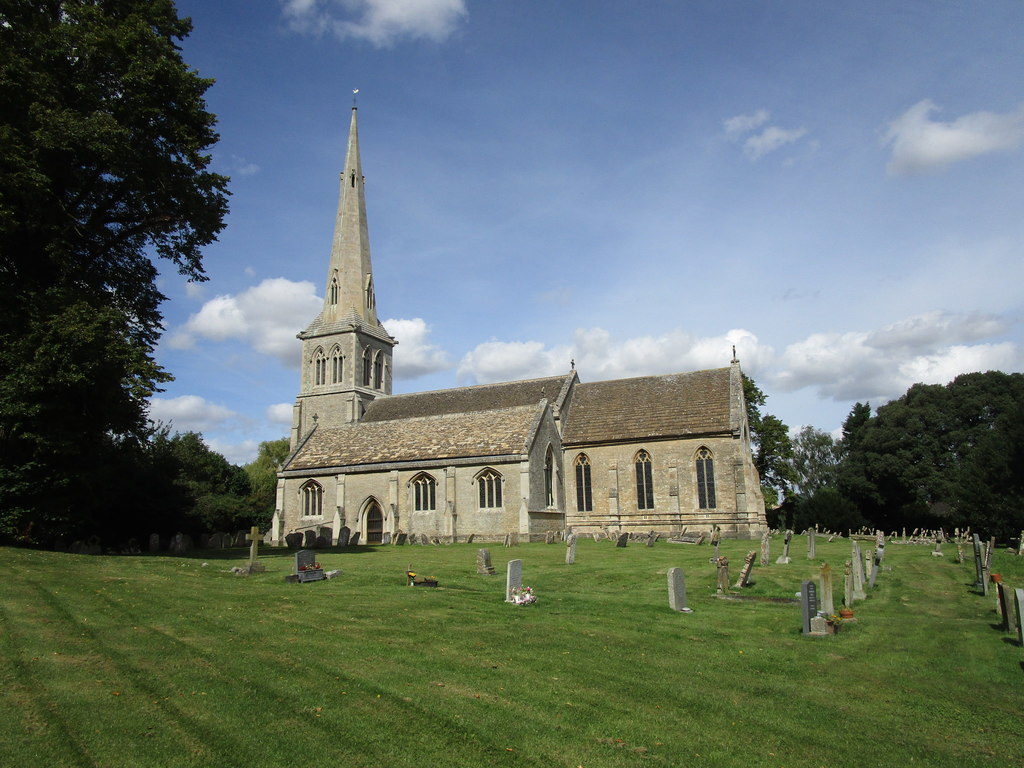
- St Mary's Church (Lower Benefield)

- Location within Northamptonshire
- Population: 339 (2011)
- OS grid reference: SP984890
  - London: 83 miles (134 km)
- Unitary authority: North Northamptonshire
- Ceremonial county: Northamptonshire
- Region: East Midlands
- Country: England
- Sovereign state: United Kingdom
- Post town: Peterborough
- Postcode district: PE8
- Dialling code: 01832
- Police: Northamptonshire
- Fire: Northamptonshire
- Ambulance: East Midlands
- UK Parliament: Corby and East Northamptonshire

Benefield is a civil parish in North Northamptonshire, England, along the A427 road and about 6 miles (9.7 km) east of Corby and 3 miles (4.8 km) west of Oundle.

== History ==
The villages name means 'open land of Bera's people'.

The name has evolved from Benefield (11th century); Banefield, Benifeld (12th); Beningfelde, Benefilde, Berifelde, Benetfeld, Benifeud, Beningfeud (13th); Benyngfielde alias Benefielde alias Beddingfielde (16th). The Domesday Book refers to the village as Benefield.

== Demographics ==
According to the 2001 census it had a population of 308, 146 males and 162 females in 138 households. increasing to 339 at the 2011 census.

== Governance ==
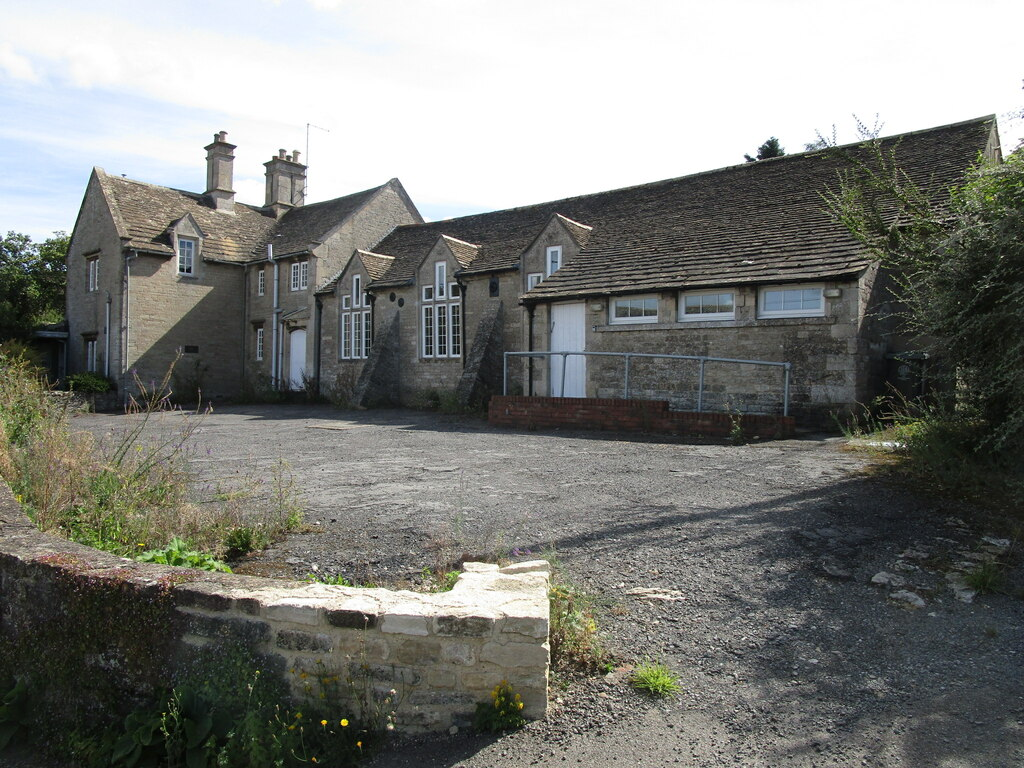
Village hall (Lower Benefield)

The parish consists of Upper Benefield and Lower Benefield. The village has its own Parish Council. The local unitary council is North Northamptonshire Council.

== Facilities ==
Lower Benefield has a village hall which was refurbished in 2009.

Upper Benefield used to have a pub 'The Wheatsheaf' pub and hotel, originally a coaching inn dating from the 17th century. The pub is now closed and being renovated to residential properties. There is also a cricket club.

Benefield Parish Church in Lower Benefield is dedicated to St Mary and is part of the Benefice of Benefield, Glapthorn and Oundle St Peter's. It is in the Rural Deanery of Oundle and is part of the Archdeaconry of Oakham within the Diocese of Peterborough. The church was re-built in 1847 and paid for by James Watts Russell of Biggin Hall, about 1.5 miles (2.4 km) west of Benefield (see below). Only the chancel of the old church was retained, dating from the 14th-century.

== Notable residents ==
- Miles Joseph Berkeley (1803–1889), cryptogamist, clergyman, and founder of the study of plant pathology

== Other buildings ==
=== Biggin Hall ===
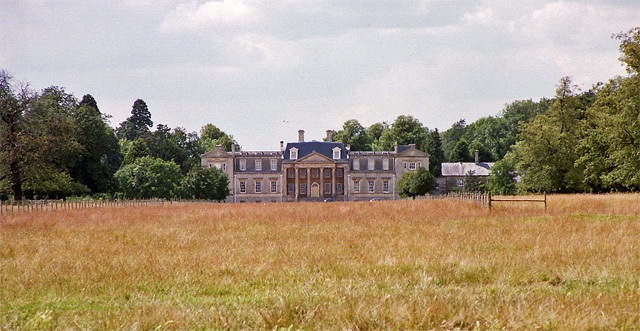
Biggin Hall

The Hall dates from ca.1700, having medieval origins, and is partly hidden behind a portico of ca.1750. There are two pavilions at each end. Miles Joseph Berkeley (1 April 1803 – 30 July 1889), an English cryptogamist and clergyman, and one of the founders of the science of plant pathology, was born in the Hall.

It is a grade II listed building. It underwent remodels in 1911, which affected multiple rooms including the study and first floor.

=== Benefield Castle ===
Benefield Castle's date of establishment is unknown; however, it is known to have existed in 1208. It has been derelict since 1315 or earlier.

It may have been one of the numerous forts thrown up during the Anarchy of King Stephen's reign (1138–44). In 1208, John seized it for the debts of Hugh de Lisurs. On 15 May 1264, the day following the Battle of Lewes, Henry III, while a prisoner with Simon de Montfort, issued a mandate to the knights and others in Benefield Castle. He stated that since peace had been made between the king and his barons, they were not to go out of the castle nor do any ill in those parts. It is likely that, in the following year, with the castle being held for Edward, the men of the castle plundered the manor of Biggin and crossed the river to Oundle, where and at Ashton they took a number of cattle. The men of Oundle, however, made a counter-attack and recovered many of their beasts.

The castle was dismantled not long afterwards. In 1298 it was described as an "old castle", and in 1315 only the site of the castle was referred to. It was described as a ruin in 1378. Currently, Benefield Castle is located in Lower Benefield, on the crest of a valley. The castle's remains are directly west of Benefield church, and southwest of a manor farm.

=== Rectory Farm ===
The building dates from 1877 to 1878 and is tall and gabled; it is located in Lower Benefield. The farm is northeast of Benefield Castle and the manor farm, as well as several churches.

=== Fermyn Woods Hall ===
Located about 2 miles (3.2 km) south-west, Fermyn Woods Hall has an Elizabethan centre in the plan of a letter 'E' with neo-Elizabethan extensions of ca.1850. The south side of the stables has the gateway from nearby Lyveden New Bield as its centrepiece. The Hall was occupied by the Belville family in the 1930s. When they left its size was reduced and parts auctioned including the elaborate large porch.
