= Weldon, Northamptonshire =

Village in Northamptonshire, England

Coordinates: 52.4956°N 0.6389°W

Weldon
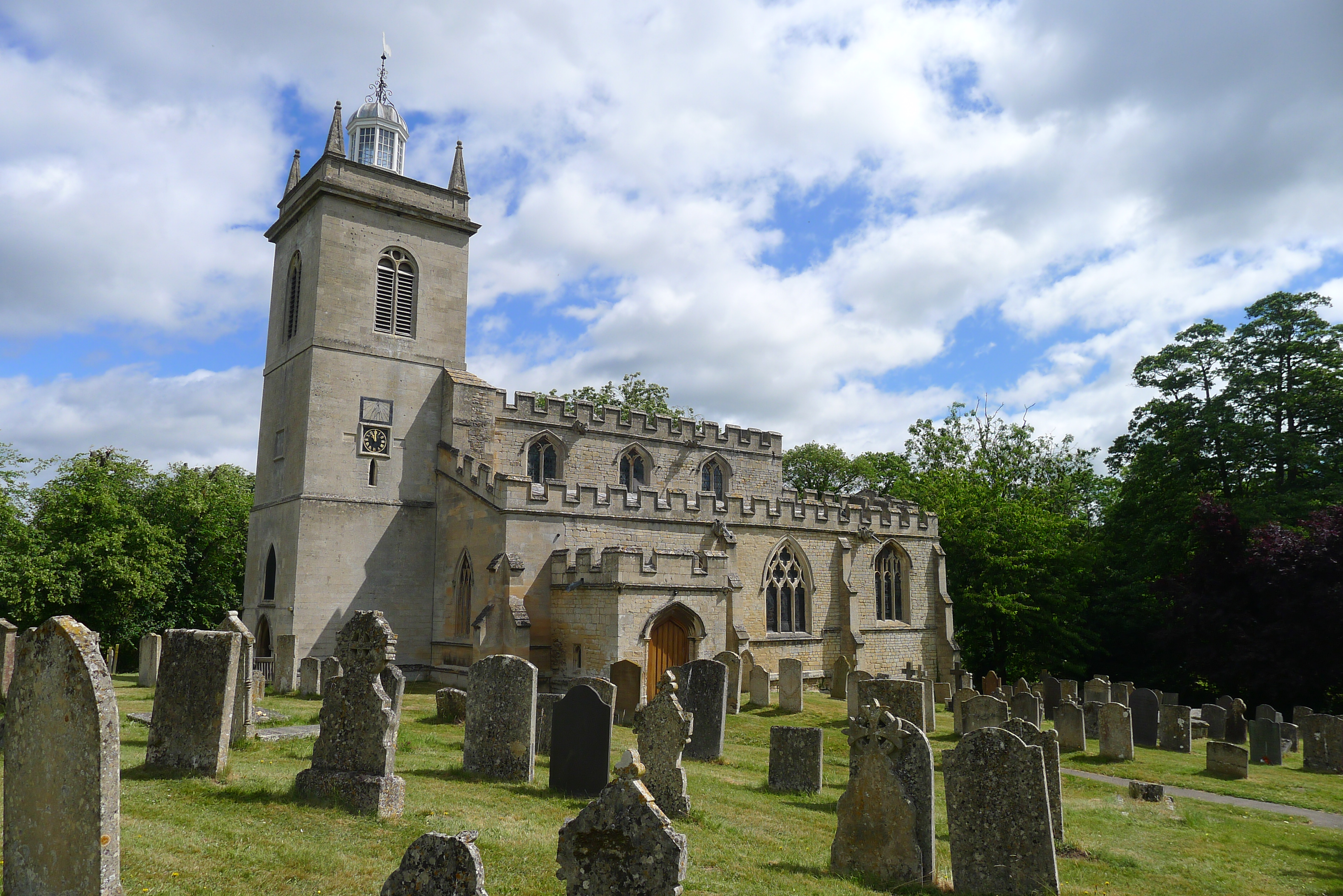
- Church of St Mary the Virgin

- Location within Northamptonshire
- Population: 2,099 (2011)
- OS grid reference: SP9289
- Unitary authority: North Northamptonshire
- Ceremonial county: Northamptonshire
- Region: East Midlands
- Country: England
- Sovereign state: United Kingdom
- Post town: Corby
- Postcode district: NN17
- Dialling code: 01536
- Police: Northamptonshire
- Fire: Northamptonshire
- Ambulance: East Midlands
- UK Parliament: Corby and East Northamptonshire

Weldon is a suburban village and civil parish on the eastern outskirts of Corby, Northamptonshire, England. It is two miles away from Corby.

== History ==
The village is listed in the Domesday Book as 'Weledene', in the Corby (Corbei) Hundred. The head of the manor before 1066 is listed as 'Weldon', likely Anglo-Saxon. The Lord in 1066 is listed as 'Northmann', perhaps an unnamed Viking or Dane. The Lord, and Tenant-in-Chief, in 1086 was Robert de Bucy (Buci), a Norman.

The village's name means 'hill with a spring/stream'.

== Geography ==
It is, currently, administered by North Northamptonshire council. Prior to local government changes in 2021 it was administered by Corby Borough Council; at the time of the 2001 census, the parish's population was 1,644 people, increasing to 2,099 at the 2011 census.

Weldon is at the crossroads of the north–south A43 trunk road which bypasses it to the west and the A427 that, locally, provides a route to Market Harborough westbound and Oundle eastbound; traffic on this road is "calmed" by an extensive scheme.

== Amenities ==
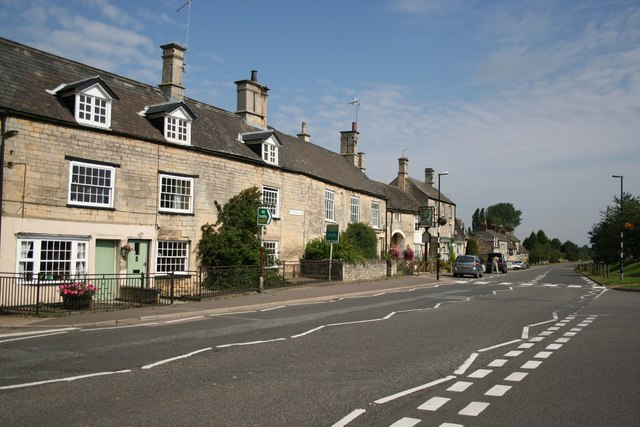
Great Weldon High Street

Weldon currently has two public houses, the CAMRA-approved Shoulder of Mutton and The George, formerly a 17th-century coaching inn. The King's Arms public house was demolished and replaced with housing. The Church of St Mary the Virgin is an early-13th century limestone built church and is located just to the south of the main village.

The village is home to Weldon Cricket Club which runs ten teams for both adults and children, the team is going from strength to strength climbing the Northamptonshire leagues. Chairman Andy Warren . and the village football team, Weldon United, play in the Northamptonshire Football Combination division two.
