= Hemington, Northamptonshire =

Village in Northamptonshire, England

Coordinates: 52.4475°N 0.3903°W

Hemington
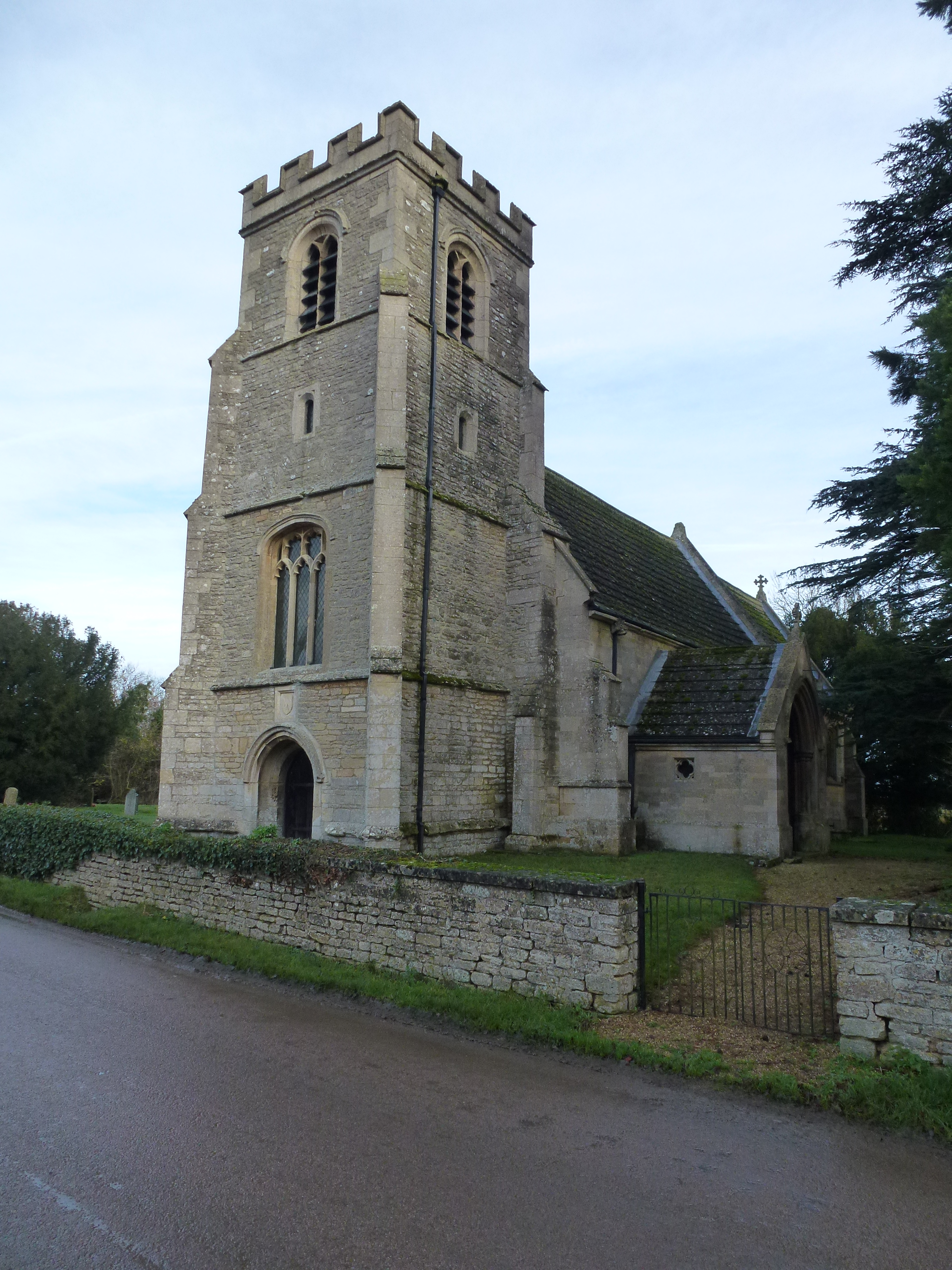
- Church of St Peter and St Paul, Hemington

- Location within Northamptonshire
- Population: 257 (2011)
- OS grid reference: TL0984
- Unitary authority: North Northamptonshire
- Ceremonial county: Northamptonshire
- Region: East Midlands
- Country: England
- Sovereign state: United Kingdom
- Post town: Peterborough
- Postcode district: PE8
- Dialling code: 01832
- Police: Northamptonshire
- Fire: Northamptonshire
- Ambulance: East Midlands
- UK Parliament: Corby and East Northamptonshire

Hemington is a village and civil parish in North Northamptonshire, England. The parish population (including the neighbouring small parishes of Luddington-in-the-Brook and Thurning) at the 2011 Census was 257.

The village's name means 'estate associated with a man called Hemma or Hemmi'. Other sources suggest the specific may be Old English hemming, meaning a border or an enclosure.
