= Rockingham, Northamptonshire =

Village in Northamptonshire, England

Coordinates: 52.5117°N 0.7269°W

Rockingham
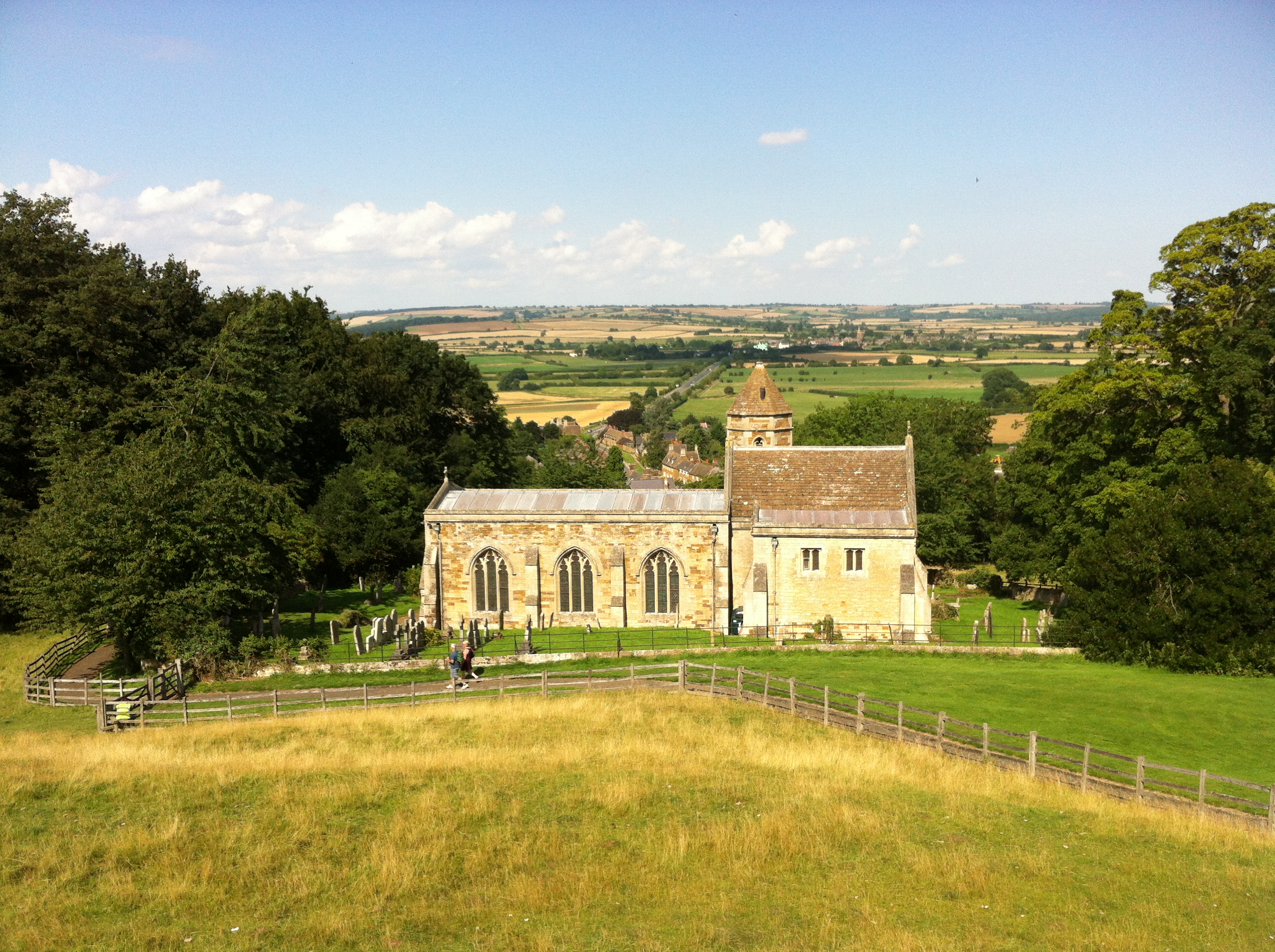
- St Leonard's Church, Rockingham

- Location within Northamptonshire
- Population: 113 (2011)
- OS grid reference: SP8691
- Unitary authority: North Northamptonshire
- Ceremonial county: Northamptonshire
- Region: East Midlands
- Country: England
- Sovereign state: United Kingdom
- Post town: Market Harborough
- Postcode district: LE16
- Dialling code: 01536
- Police: Northamptonshire
- Fire: Northamptonshire
- Ambulance: East Midlands
- UK Parliament: Corby and East Northamptonshire

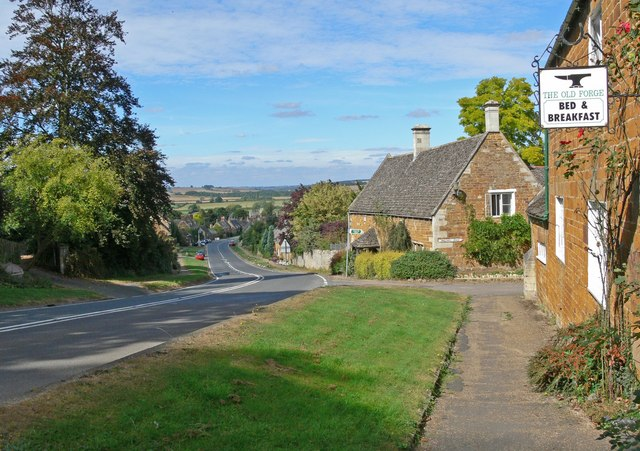
A view down Main Street (the A6003 road) in Rockingham

Rockingham is a village and civil parish in North Northamptonshire, England. Close to the border of Leicestershire and Rutland, the village is largely connected to the town of Corby where various local organisations utilise the Rockingham name. Other nearby villages include Cottingham, Great Easton and Caldecott. During the 2001 census, the parish's population was 115 people, falling marginally to 113 at the 2011 Census.

The village is the site of Rockingham Castle and gives its name to Rockingham Forest; the extinct Marquess of Rockingham title; Rockingham Primary School in Corby; as well as the former Rockingham Motor Speedway in North Northamptonshire. The A6003 road runs north–south through the village and crosses the Welland valley.

== History ==
The village's name means homestead/village of the people of Hroc(a) in Old English.

Rockingham was the site of a council convened by William II on 25 February 1095, intended to depose Anselm as Archbishop of Canterbury. The Lords Spiritual, led by the Bishop of Durham, fell in line with the king, arguing that Anselm's support of the French-backed pope Urban II against the imperial pope Clement III made him a traitor to the realm. The Lords Temporal demurred and supported Anselm, in the absence of any proof of felony.
