= Wood Burcote =

Hamlet in Northamptonshire, England

Coordinates: 52.11247°N 0.98651°W

- Location within Northamptonshire
- OS grid reference: SP695465
- Unitary authority: West Northamptonshire
- Ceremonial county: Northamptonshire
- Region: East Midlands
- Country: England
- Sovereign state: United Kingdom

Wood Burcote is a hamlet located less than one mile south of Towcester in West Northamptonshire in the English county of Northamptonshire. It takes its name from a small wood above the village which overlooks the valley of the River Tove. The wood is carpeted with bluebells and ramsons in the Spring, suggesting it is the remnant of an ancient woodland.

== Former resident ==
Richard Litcott (or Lidcott, Lydcot etc.) lived in Wood Burcote in the early years of the 17th Century. His wife was Judith, as was his daughter. The latter married Gideon Fisher, of Carleton, Bedfordshire, in 1640. Several of his sons attended Oxford University, and later the family had connections with Ealing, Middlesex. During the Civil War, he was at Sandown Castle, north of Deal, in Kent, and his wife may have died in Deal, in 1661
