= Little Oakley, Northamptonshire =

Village and former civil parish in Northampton

Coordinates: 52.4633°N 0.6832°W

Little Oakley
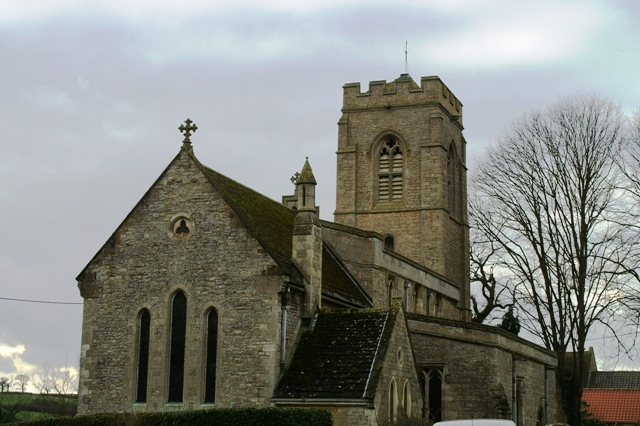

- Location within Northamptonshire
- OS grid reference: SP8985
- Civil parish: Newton and Little Oakley
- Unitary authority: North Northamptonshire
- Ceremonial county: Northamptonshire
- Region: East Midlands
- Country: England
- Sovereign state: United Kingdom
- Post town: Corby
- Postcode district: NN18
- Dialling code: 01536
- Police: Northamptonshire
- Fire: Northamptonshire
- Ambulance: East Midlands
- UK Parliament: Kettering

Little Oakley is a village and former civil parish, now in the parish of Newton and Little Oakley, in the North Northamptonshire district, in the ceremonial county of Northamptonshire, England. It is situated between Corby and Kettering. In 1931 the parish had a population of 85. On 1 April 1935 the parish was abolished and merged with Great Oakley to form Oakley. Inside the village is St. Peter's church, which dates from the thirteenth century. Opposite the church is Primrose Cottage, a stone-built cottage dating back to the seventeenth century, where several generations of one family once lived and are now buried in the church yard.

The villages name means 'Oak-tree wood/clearing'.
