= Cottingham, Northamptonshire =

Village in Northamptonshire, England

Coordinates: 52.5059°N 0.7565°W

Cottingham
- Location within Northamptonshire
- Population: 906 (2011)
- OS grid reference: SP8490
- Unitary authority: North Northamptonshire
- Ceremonial county: Northamptonshire
- Region: East Midlands
- Country: England
- Sovereign state: United Kingdom
- Post town: Market Harborough
- Postcode district: LE16
- Dialling code: 01536
- Police: Northamptonshire
- Fire: Northamptonshire
- Ambulance: East Midlands
- UK Parliament: Kettering

Cottingham is a village and civil parish in North Northamptonshire, England. It can trace its history back to Roman times. Cotingeham is listed in the Domesday Book and is also mentioned in the Anglo-Saxon Chronicle. It is located north-west of the town of Corby and is administered as part of that town's borough. At the time of the 2001 census, Cottingham parish's population was 912, reducing slightly to 906 at the 2011 census.

The village's name means 'Homestead/village of Cott's/Cotta's people'.

Cottingham had a football club called New Cottingham F.C., which was established in 2009, but it folded in 2015. Although it was based in Corby. It won the Fred Deeley Memorial Trophy in 2011 and was the runner-up in the same competition a year later. It also won the Bob Quincey Shield for the first time in its history in 2013 and the Thornton Cup in 2015. The club was managed by Adam Muir (2009–10), Neil Jarman (2010–2013) and Neil Woollacott (2013–2015).

The village has a community-run Village Store and Cafe that opened in September 2011. The project has been backed by more than 180 shareholders, who have invested more than £11,000 in the venture.

The village is served by the Rutland Flyer and Welland Wanderer bus routes.
