= Middleton, Northamptonshire =

Village in Northamptonshire, England

Coordinates: 52.5009°N 0.7639°W

Middleton
- Location within Northamptonshire
- Population: 414 (2011)
- OS grid reference: SP840899
- Unitary authority: North Northamptonshire
- Ceremonial county: Northamptonshire
- Region: East Midlands
- Country: England
- Sovereign state: United Kingdom
- Post town: Market Harborough
- Postcode district: LE16
- Dialling code: 01536
- Police: Northamptonshire
- Fire: Northamptonshire
- Ambulance: East Midlands
- UK Parliament: Kettering

Middleton is a village and civil parish in North Northamptonshire close to the county boundary with Leicestershire. At the time of the 2001 census, the parish's population was 328 people, increasing to 414 at the 2011 Census.

The villages name means 'middle farm/settlement'.

== Geography ==
Middleton is just to the west of the town of Corby, with Cottingham and East Carlton nearby. There is a very steep hill known locally simply as "The Hill". The village has a Leicestershire postcode.

== Amenities ==
There is a pub with a restaurant - The Red Lion, Willow Cottage B & B and the Jurassic Way waymarked long-distance footpath passes through the village.
