= A427 road =

Road in England

A427

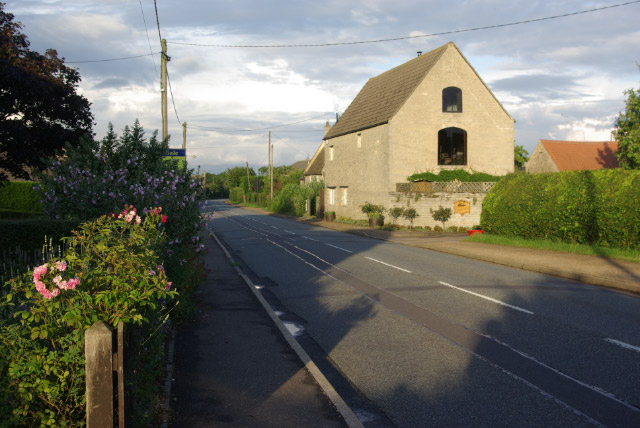
- The A427 at Upper Benefield

Route information
- Length: 21.0 mi (33.8 km)

Major junctions
- West end: Market Harborough
- A6 A4304 A6003 A6014 A6116; A43 A605
- East end: Oundle

Location
- Country: United Kingdom
- Primary destinations: Market Harborough; Corby

Road network
- Roads in the United Kingdom; Motorways; A and B road zones

The A427 road is a major road in the English Midlands. It connects the Leicestershire town of Market Harborough and the A6 with the Northamptonshire town of Oundle and the A605.

== History ==
When first designated the A427 ran from a junction with the A45 southwest of Rugby through Rugby itself to Clifton-upon-Dunsmore crossing the A5 through Catthorpe (past what is now the Catthorpe Interchange between the M1 motorway, the M6 and the A14 road). It then passed through Swinford, South Kilworth, North Kilworth, Husbands Bosworth, Theddingworth, Lubenham and Market Harborough, and from there along its current route to Oundle. By 1976 the former A4114 road from Coventry via Lutterworth to North Kilworth had taken the designation A427 in place of the earlier route. By 2010 the A427 ended in Market Harborough.

A section of the original route SW of Rugby is now the A4071. From Rugby to South Kilworth it is the B5414, from South Kilworth and North Kilworth is no longer classified. The section from North Kilworth and Market Harborough is now part of the A4304. The 1976 route has now taken the B4027 and A4303 designation between Coventry and Market Harborough.

== Route ==
From West to East its route is:

- Market Harborough
- Dingley
- Brampton Ash
- Stoke Albany (bypassed)
- Wilbarston (bypassed)
- East Carlton (bypassed)
- Corby
- Weldon
- Upper Benefield
- Lower Benefield
- Oundle

Running through Corby, the A427 meets with the A6003 on the western edge of the town and it has a 1.0-mile (1.6 km) overlap with the A43 in the Weldon North Industrial Estate, where it is briefly dual carriageway.
