= Thurning, Northamptonshire =

Village in Northamptonshire, England

Coordinates: 52.4297°N 0.4057°W

Thurning
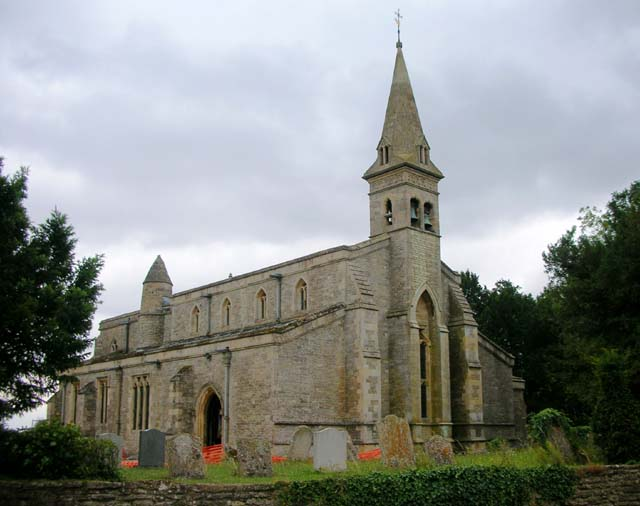
- Church of St James, Thurning

- Location within Northamptonshire
- Population: 93 (2001)
- OS grid reference: TL0882
- Unitary authority: North Northamptonshire
- Ceremonial county: Northamptonshire
- Region: East Midlands
- Country: England
- Sovereign state: United Kingdom
- Post town: Peterborough
- Postcode district: PE8
- Dialling code: 01832
- Police: Northamptonshire
- Fire: Northamptonshire
- Ambulance: East Midlands
- UK Parliament: Corby and East Northamptonshire

Thurning is a village and civil parish in the English county of Northamptonshire. Located in the north-east of the county, about 5.5 miles south-east of Oundle, Thurning forms part of the civil parish of Hemington, Luddington and Thurning. Until 1888, the ecclesiastical parish of Thurning was partly in Northamptonshire and partly in Huntingdonshire, its parish church being in the latter county. At the time of the 2001 census, the population of Thurning Civil Parish was 93 people. At the time of the 2011 Census, the population of the village remained less than 100 and is included in the civil parish of Hemington.

The village's name probably means, 'place with thorn trees'.

== St James' Church ==
The parish church of St James is a Grade II listed building. Dating from the 12th century, the west wall and spirelet were rebuilt and the church restored in 1880 by Carpenter and Ingelow. The church had links with the Oxford Movement in the late 19th century.

== Thurning Feast ==
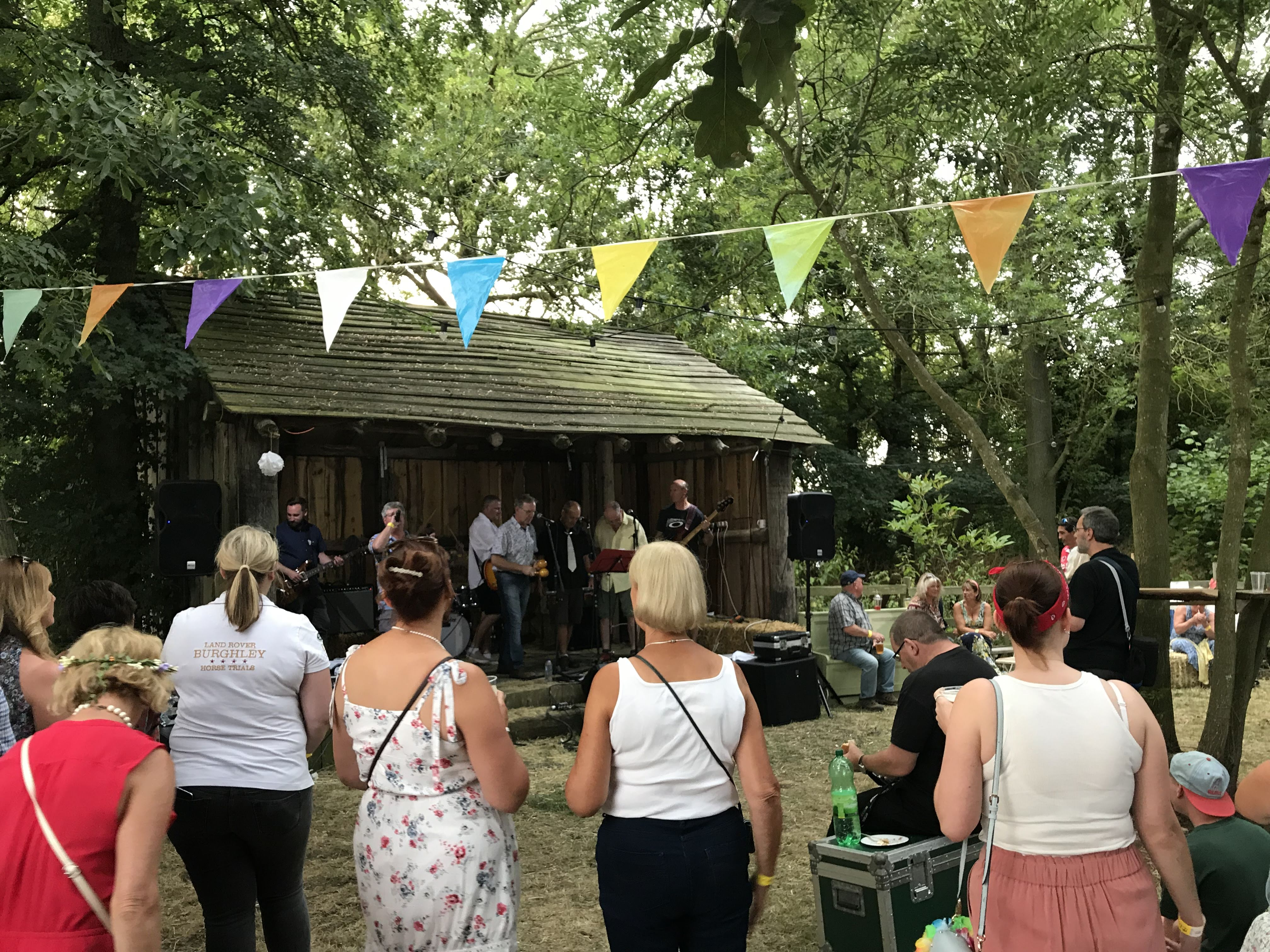
Local band The Feasty Boys performing at Thurning Feast

Thurning Feast is an annual celebration held on 25 July and located in a meadow next to the village's 12th century church. 25 July is the feast day of Saint James the Pilgrim who is patron of the church. Locally popular, the feast includes live music performances, food stalls, a vintage funfair and bars.

== Notable people ==
- John Balderston (died 1719), twice vice-chancellor of the University of Cambridge
- Christopher Whall (1849 – 1924), stained-glass artist
