= Rutland Flyer =

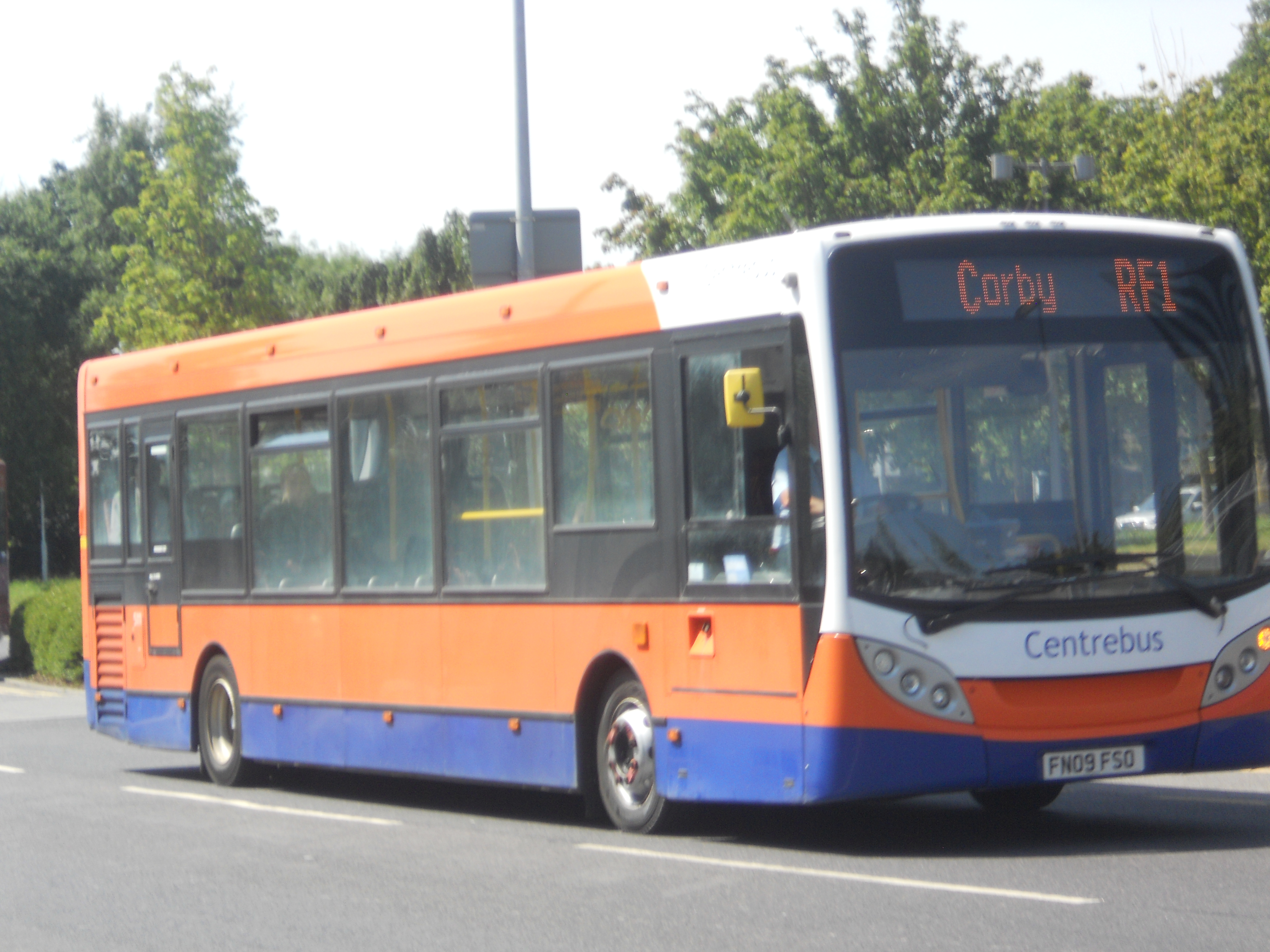
- An Enviro 200 bus operating route RF1 to Corby

Overview
- Operator: Centrebus
- Peak vehicle requirement: 5
- Status: Ceased
- Ended service: 27 August 2022 (routes rebranded R1 & R2)
- Predecessors: Paul James Coaches/Veolia Transport

Service
- Frequency: Every hour Monday to Saturday daytimes only
- Operates: Monday to Saturday
- Annual patronage: 120,000+ (2018)

Rutland Flyer was the name for bus routes operated by Centrebus in the English county of Rutland and surrounding areas.

The routes were numbered RF1 and RF2, During 2018 the RF1 service carried over 120,000 passengers.

== History ==
The Rutland Flyer services were formed in the early 2000s by Leicestershire County Council, Rutland County Council and now defunct operator Paul James coaches.

On 22 March 2018, Centrebus announced its intention to cease operating the RF1 route. At the time, it was operated on a contract worth £50,392. It was re-tendered with Stagecoach being the only bidder with an offer to operate the route for £270,840 per year. The tendering process was run again resulting in the route being awarded back to Centrebus on a five-year contract for £122,000 per year.

In February 2022, the Saturday frequency of both services was temporarily reduced to every two hours as a result of driver shortages although by 21 May 2022 they were restored.

In July 2022, Centrebus informed Rutland County Council it was relinquishing the contract for the RF1 service from 28 August, replacement services from Bland's will operate from 30 August.

As part of the change of operator the Rutland Flyer name will cease to exist from 28 August with services around Rutland renumbered with an R prefix
