= 1902 County Championship =

English cricket tournament

- Cricket format: First-class cricket (3 days)
- Tournament format: League system
- Champions: Yorkshire (6th title)
- Participants: 15
- Matches: 156
- Most runs: Bobby Abel (1,570 for Surrey)
- Most wickets: Fred Tate (153 for Sussex)

The 1902 County Championship was the 13th officially organised running of the County Championship, and ran from 1 May to 6 September 1902. Yorkshire County Cricket Club won their sixth championship title, their third title in successive seasons. Sussex finished in second place, their best placing yet.

== Table ==
- One point was awarded for a win, and one point was taken away for each loss. Final placings were decided by dividing the number of points earned by the number of completed matches (i.e. those that ended in a win or a loss), and multiplying by 100.

Team	Pld	W	L	D	A	Pts	Fin	%Fin
Yorkshire	26	13	1	11	1	12	14	85.71
Sussex	24	7	3	14	0	4	10	40.00
Nottinghamshire	20	6	3	11	0	3	9	33.33
Surrey	28	8	5	15	0	3	13	23.08
Lancashire	24	7	5	11	1	2	12	16.67
Warwickshire	18	6	5	7	0	1	11	9.09
Kent	22	8	8	6	0	0	16	0.00
Somerset	18	7	7	4	0	0	14	0.00
Worcestershire	22	5	6	11	0	-1	11	–9.09
Derbyshire	16	4	5	7	0	–1	9	–11.11
Leicestershire	20	2	4	13	1	–2	6	–33.33
Middlesex	18	3	7	7	1	–4	10	–40.00
Essex	20	2	5	13	0	–3	7	–42.86
Gloucestershire	20	3	9	8	0	–6	12	–50.00
Hampshire	16	2	10	4	0	–8	12	–66.67

== Records ==
Most runs
Aggregate	Average	Player	County
1,570	47.57	Bobby Abel	Surrey
1,349	40.87	Cuthbert Burnup	Kent
1,291	44.51	Johnny Tyldesley	Lancashire
1,276	45.57	Tom Taylor	Yorkshire
1,153	52.40	Arthur Shrewsbury	Nottinghamshire

Most wickets
Aggregate	Average	Player	County
153	14.28	Fred Tate	Sussex
140	12.48	Wilfred Rhodes	Yorkshire
138	15.32	Thomas Wass	Nottinghamshire
123	11.99	Schofield Haigh	Yorkshire
115	17.15	Beaumont Cranfield	Somerset
