= Brigstock =

Village in Northamptonshire, England

Coordinates: 52.4593°N 0.6106°W

- Location within Northamptonshire
- Population: 1,357 (2011)
- OS grid reference: SP9485
- Unitary authority: North Northamptonshire
- Ceremonial county: Northamptonshire
- Region: East Midlands
- Country: England
- Sovereign state: United Kingdom
- Post town: Kettering
- Postcode district: NN14
- Police: Northamptonshire
- Fire: Northamptonshire
- Ambulance: East Midlands
- UK Parliament: Corby and East Northamptonshire

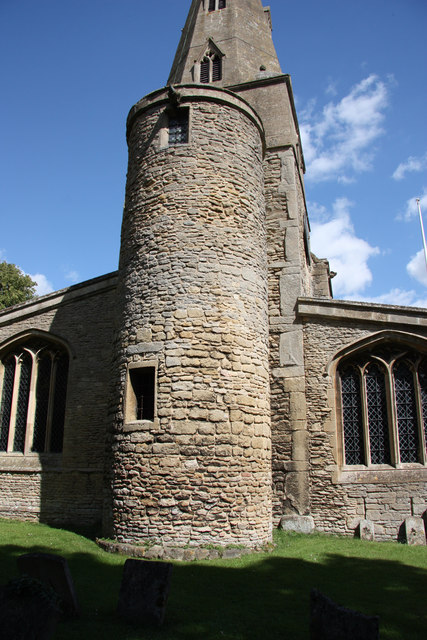
Anglo-Saxon stair turret of St Andrew's church, one of four in the country.

Brigstock is a village and civil parish in the English county of Northamptonshire. Administratively it is part of North Northamptonshire. From 2001 to 2011, the parish population increased from 1,329 to 1,357.

== Toponymy ==
The village's name origin is uncertain. 'Bridge outlying farm/settlement' or perhaps, 'birch-tree outlying farm/settlement'. Alternatively, 'birch-tree stump'.

== History ==
The village is surrounded by the remnants of the royal forest of Rockingham.

Brigstock is an ancient settlement, dating back to the Bronze Age or Saxon period. Several properties in the village appear in the Domesday Book of 1086, in which Brigstock is referred to as "Brigstoc", and Roman relics have been found in and around the village. The village cross, found in the heart of the old village, was erected as a monument after Elizabeth I passed through the village. The parish church of St Andrew shows remnants of a tower which is probably 10th-century.

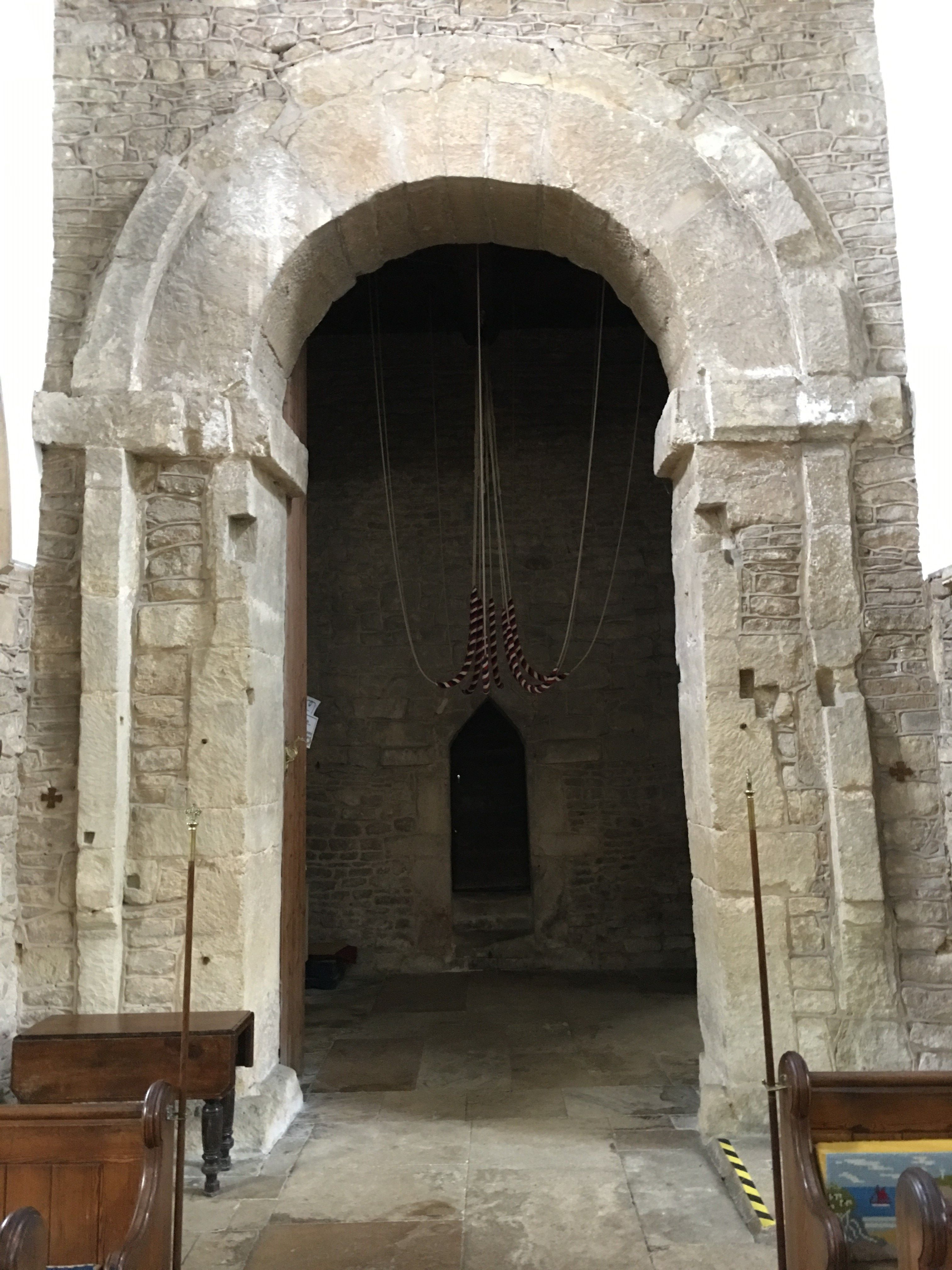
The Saxon arch at the west end of St Andrew's Church.

During the Middle Ages, Brigstock was an administrative hub for the Rockingham Forest, and was granted a market charter in 1426.

The Grade II* listed Manor House was built as a hunting lodge in a clearing of the Royal forest of Rockingham; in 1890 the house was remodelled by the Victorian architect John Alfred Gotch.

There was unrest in Brigstock over new deer parks at the house and the royal forest in May 1603. The villagers led by Simon Montague and Mr Chany tried to stop labourers cutting timber in the park. Next the village women protested at workmen clearing trees and brush in the park. Chany went to London to argue that Simon Montague ought to be keeper of the King's deer. The protestors let the deer out of the parks at Brigstock into Farming Wood in Rockingham Forest and Geddington Woods.

The first school in the village was endowed in the 17th century, and whilst that building no longer stands, the historic centre of the village contains buildings from the 17th and 18th centuries. There are 49 listed properties in the village. Brigstock is one of the largest villages in the region.

The tomb of Robert Vernon, 1st Baron Lyveden (1800–1873), a Liberal Party politician, is located within the church of St Andrew.
