= Carlton Curlieu =

Village and civil parish in England

Coordinates: 52.569°N 0.978°W

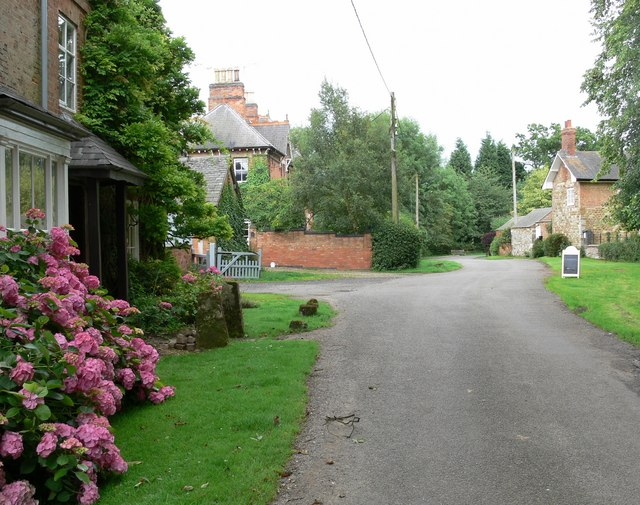

- Location within Leicestershire
- District: Harborough
- Shire county: Leicestershire
- Region: East Midlands
- Country: England
- Sovereign state: United Kingdom
- Post town: LEICESTER
- Postcode district: LE8
- Dialling code: 0116
- Police: Leicestershire
- Fire: Leicestershire
- Ambulance: East Midlands
- UK Parliament: Harborough, Oadby and Wigston

Carlton Curlieu is a small village and civil parish in the Harborough district of Leicestershire, about eleven miles south-east of Leicester city centre, and not far from Kibworth.

The village's name means 'farm/settlement of the free peasants'. In 1253, the village was held by William de Curley.

== Population ==
The Domesday Survey listed 24 inhabitants and by 1563 there were 25 households. According to the 2001 census, the parish had a population of 30. The population remained less than 100 at the 2011 census. Details are included in the civil parish of Illston on the Hill.

== The Church of St Mary the Virgin ==
The church was founded in the 11th century. Of the 12th century church building only the lower stages of the tower remain. The old church, with the exception of the tower and north chapel, was demolished in 1767 and rebuilt in red brick with stone buttresses. In 1880-81 the building was restored, re-roofed and the interior was refitted.

Carlton Curlieu Hall is a Grade II* listed building.

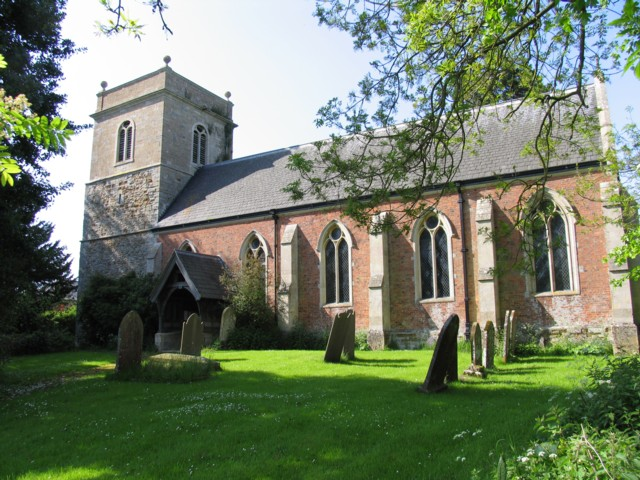
St Mary Carlton Curlieu
