= Stanion =

Coordinates: 52.4688°N 0.6545°W

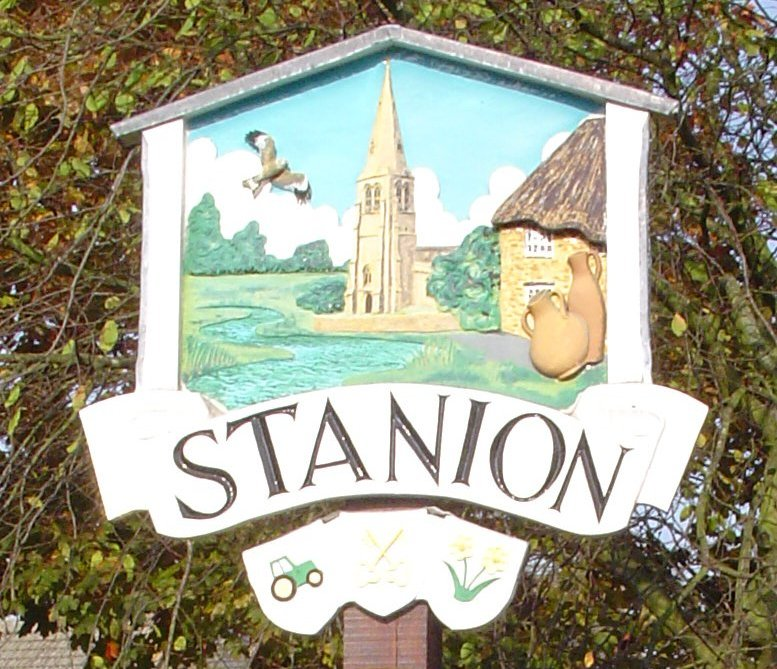
- Village sign

- Location within Northamptonshire
- Population: 1,252 (2011)
- OS grid reference: SP9186
- Unitary authority: North Northamptonshire
- Ceremonial county: Northamptonshire
- Region: East Midlands
- Country: England
- Sovereign state: United Kingdom
- Post town: Kettering
- Postcode district: NN14
- Dialling code: 01536
- Police: Northamptonshire
- Fire: Northamptonshire
- Ambulance: East Midlands
- UK Parliament: Kettering

Stanion is a village and civil parish in North Northamptonshire, England. At the time of 2001 census, the parish's population was 873 people, increasing to 1,252 at the 2011 Census. There is a Church of England primary school. Gavron

== History ==
Stanion existed before the Norman Conquest, carrying the Old English place name of Stanerc – stone arc (stainaz > stān "stone" + Lat. arca > erc "arc", arch, bend). The village is noted in the 1086 Domesday Book as being in the hundred of Corby in Northamptonshire, with 23 households.

The village's name, Stanion, means 'building made of stone'. It is also spelt as Stanyon is numerous old documents.

The village church is dedicated to Saint Peter. Within the church there is a curious antiquity. This is a 7 ft long whalebone, although tradition avers that it is actually part of the skeleton of a Dun Cow. This was a fabled beast from English folklore, and according to various versions of the story the Stanion cow was either killed or died of a broken heart after being tricked by a witch. Skrimshaw etched onto the bone indicates it dates from the 17th century.

The 1777 Northamptonshire Militia List for Corby Hundred shows 22 men enrolled for Stanion. So the population remained relatively constant from the 11th through the 18th century.

The village of Stanion was shown in the wartime film "Springtime in an English Village (1944)"

== Notable people ==
- Stan Leadbetter (1937–2013), first-class cricketer
