= North Northamptonshire =

District in England

- Unitary authority area
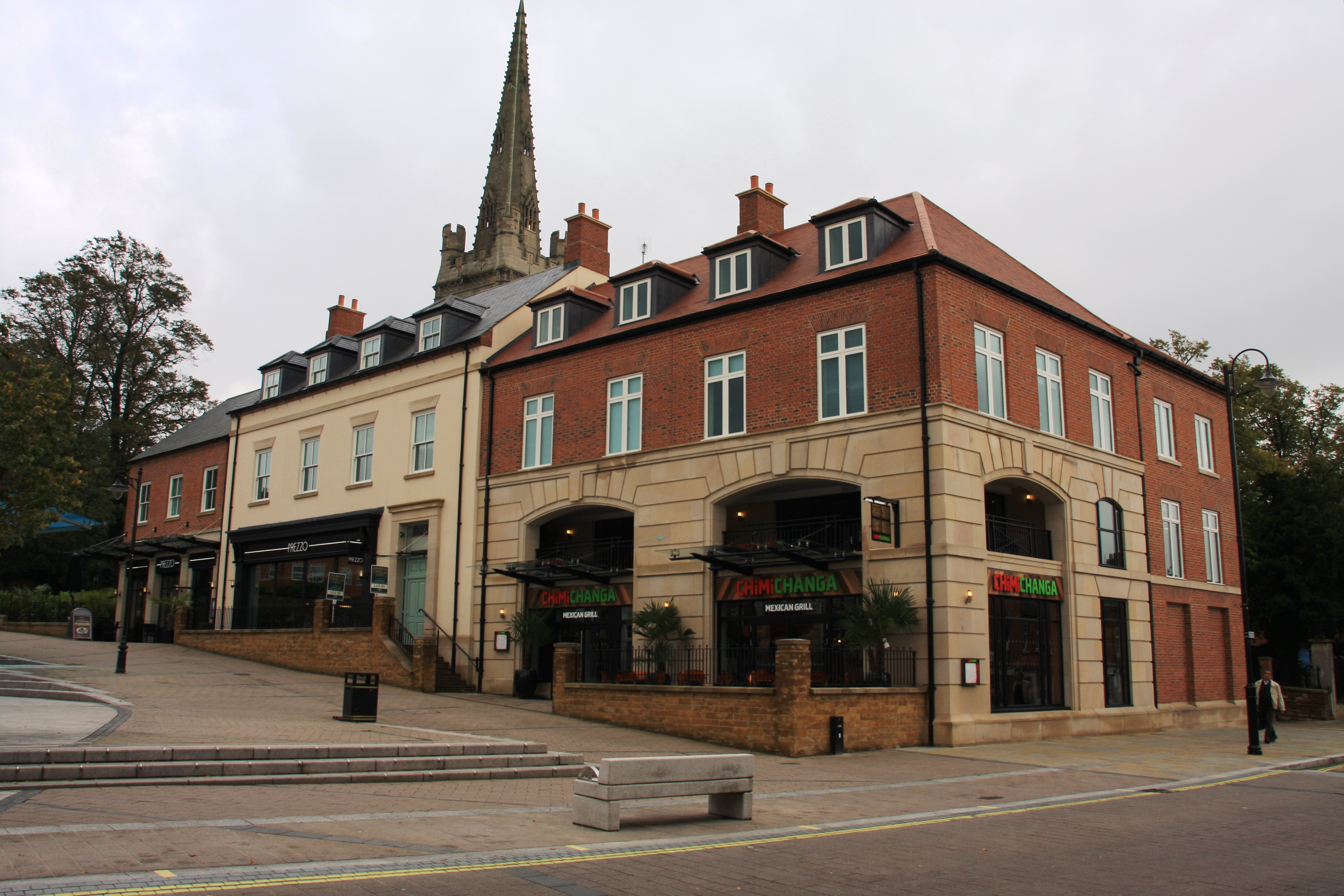
- Kettering, the district's second largest town

- North Northamptonshire shown within Northamptonshire
- Coordinates: 52.400°N 0.728°W
- Sovereign state: United Kingdom
- Country: England
- Region: East Midlands
- Ceremonial county: Northamptonshire
- Incorporated: 1 April 2021
- Administrative HQ: Corby Cube

Government
  - Type: Unitary authority with leader and cabinet
  - Body: North Northamptonshire Council
  - House of Commons: 3 MPs: Lee Barron (L); Rosie Wrighting (L); Gen Kitchen (L)

Area
  - Total: 381 sq mi (987 km^{2})
  - Rank: 25th

Population (2024)
  - Total: 373,871
  - Rank: 24th
  - Density: 980/sq mi (379/km^{2})

Ethnicity (2021)

Religion (2021)
  - Religion: List: 47.9% Christianity; 42.6% no religion; 1.3% Hinduism; 1.2% Islam; 0.5% Sikhism; 0.3% Buddhism; 0.1% Judaism; 0.5% other; 5.6% not stated
- Time zone: UTC+0 (GMT)
  - Summer (DST): UTC+1 (BST)
- Postcode area: NN
- Dialling codes: 01536; 01933
- ISO 3166 code: GB-NNH
- GSS code: E06000061
- ITL code: TLF25
- GVA: 2021 estimate
  - Total: £7.4 billion
  - Per capita: £20,612
- GDP (nominal): 2021 estimate
  - Total: £8.5 billion
  - Per capita: £23,536

North Northamptonshire is a unitary authority area in the ceremonial county of Northamptonshire, England, and was created in 2021. The council is based in Corby, the district's largest town. Other notable towns are Kettering, Wellingborough, Rushden, Raunds, Desborough, Rothwell, Irthlingborough, Thrapston and Oundle.

North Northamptonshire borders the Peterborough, Rutland, Milton Keynes, Huntingdonshire, Bedford, Harborough, West Northamptonshire and South Kesteven districts.

It has a string of lakes along the Nene Valley Conservation Park, associated heritage railway, the village of Fotheringhay which has tombs of the House of York as well as a towering church supported by flying buttresses. This division has a well-preserved medieval castle in private hands next to Corby – Rockingham Castle – and about 20 other notable country houses, many of which have visitor gardens or days.

== History ==
North Northamptonshire was created on 1 April 2021 by the merger of the four non-metropolitan districts of Corby, East Northamptonshire, Kettering, and Wellingborough. The new council took on the functions of these districts, plus those of the abolished Northamptonshire County Council within the area. The way these changes was implemented was to create a new non-metropolitan district and a non-metropolitan county covering the area, both called North Northamptonshire. There is no county council; instead the district council performs county-level functions, making it a unitary authority. North Northamptonshire remains part of the ceremonial county of Northamptonshire for the purposes of lieutenancy and shrievalty.

In March 2018, following financial and cultural mismanagement by the cabinet and officers at Northamptonshire County Council, the then Secretary of State for Local Government, Sajid Javid, sent commissioner Max Caller into the council, who recommended the county council and all district and borough councils in the county be abolished, and replaced by two unitary authorities, one covering the west, and one the north of the county. These proposals were approved in April 2019. It meant that the districts of Daventry, Northampton, and South Northamptonshire were merged to form a new unitary authority called West Northamptonshire, whilst the second unitary authority North Northamptonshire consists of the former Corby, East Northamptonshire, Kettering, and Wellingborough districts.

The council logo depicts Rockingham Castle, the River Welland and a red kite. The red kite is a bird of prey that has become strongly associated with the county of Northamptonshire, and is particularly commonplace in the north-eastern parts of the county around Corby and Rockingham Forest.

== Governance ==
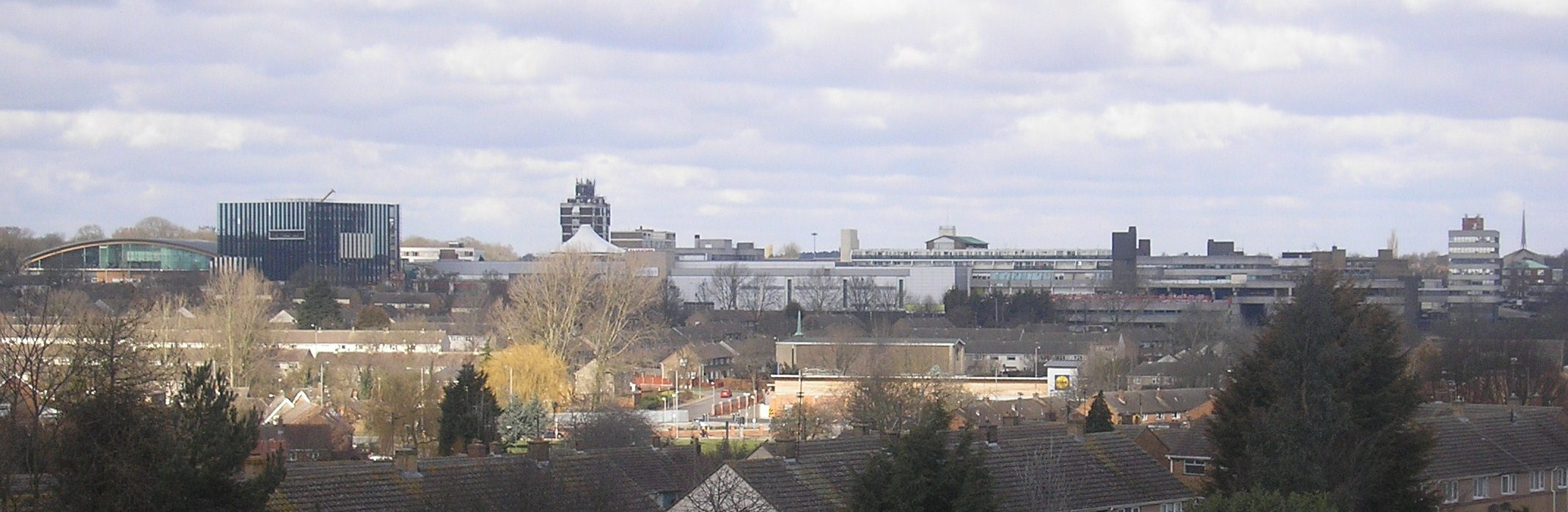
Corby, the administrative centre and largest settlement in North Northamptonshire

North Northamptonshire Council provides both county-level and district-level services. The whole area is also covered by civil parishes, which form a second tier of local government.

== Settlements and parishes ==
The parish councils for Burton Latimer, Corby, Desborough, Finedon, Higham Ferrers, Irthlingborough, Kettering, Oundle, Raunds, Rothwell, Rushden, Thrapston and Wellingborough have declared their parishes to be towns, allowing them to take the style "town council".

Population pyramid of North Northamptonshire

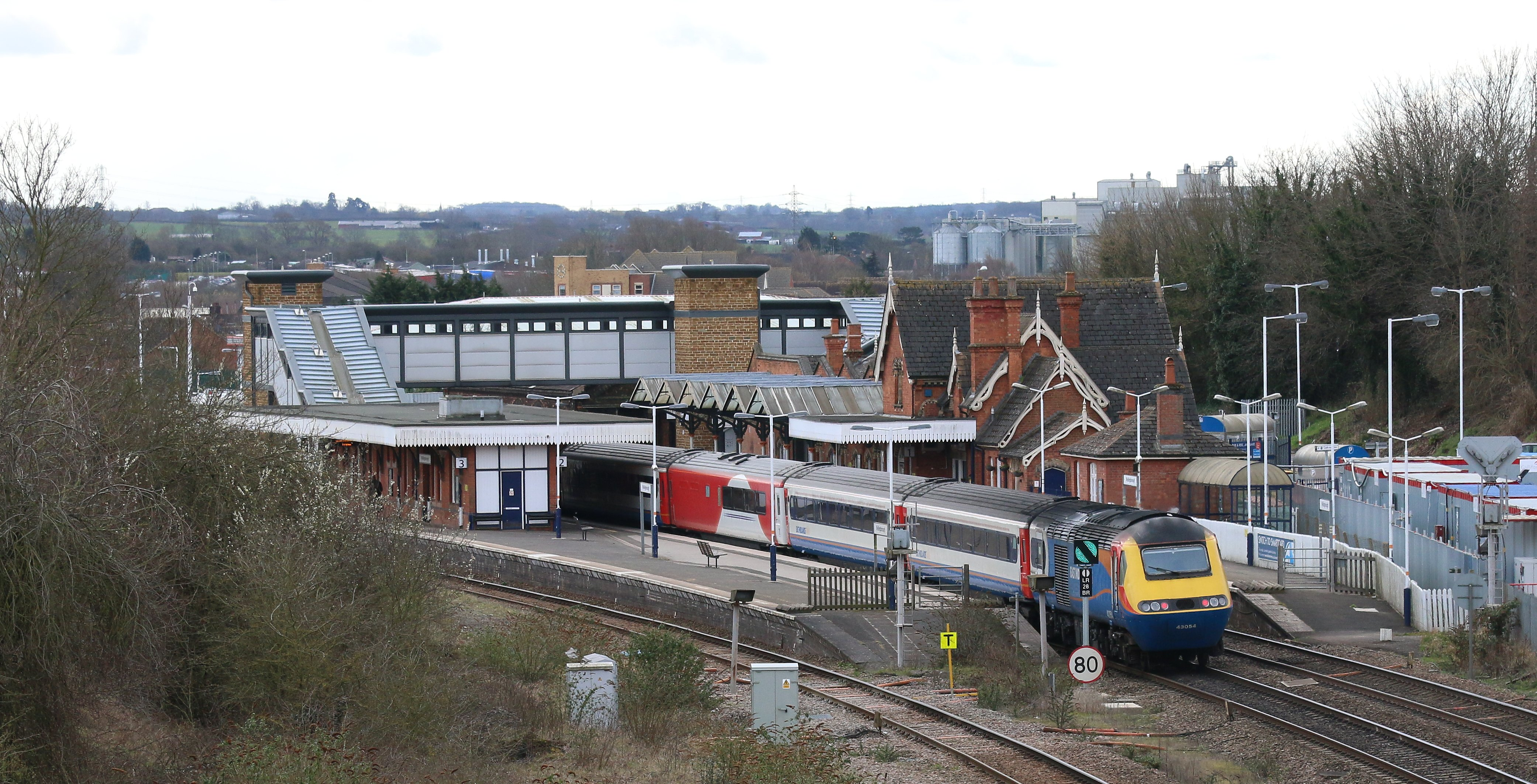
Wellingborough, the third-largest settlement in North Northamptonshire

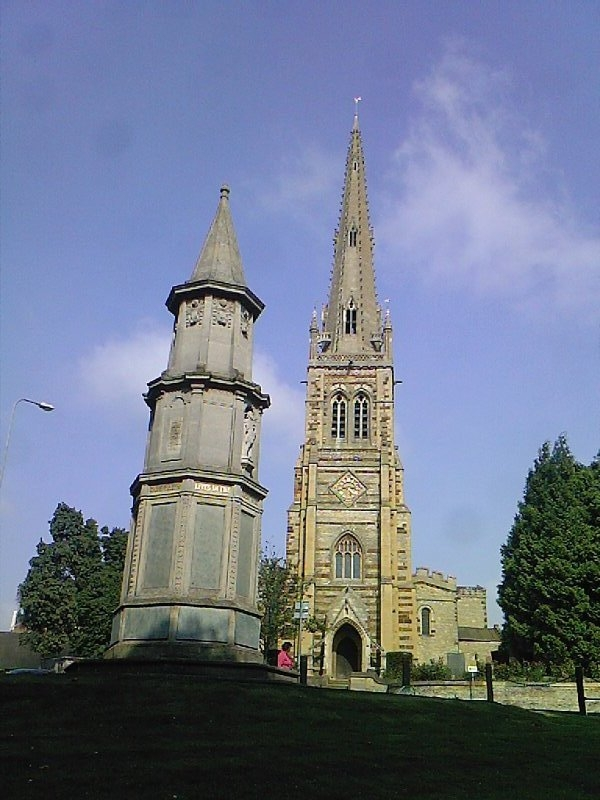
Rushden, the fourth-largest settlement in North Northamptonshire

- Achurch, Aldwincle, Apethorpe, Ashley, Ashton
- Barnwell, Barton Seagrave, Benefield, Blatherwycke, Bozeat, Brampton Ash, Braybrooke, Brigstock, Broughton, Bulwick, Burton Latimer
- Chelveston cum Caldecott, Clopton, Corby, Collyweston, Cotterstock, Cottingham, Cranford, Cransley
- Deene, Deenethorpe, Denford, Desborough, Dingley, Duddington-with-Fineshade
- Earls Barton, East Carlton, Easton Maudit, Easton on the Hill, Ecton
- Finedon, Fotheringhay
- Geddington, Glapthorn, Grafton Underwood, Great Addington, Great Doddington, Great Harrowden, Grendon, Gretton
- Hardwick, Hargrave, Harrington, Harringworth, Hemington, Higham Ferrers
- Irchester, Irthlingborough, Islip, Isham
- Kettering, King's Cliffe
- Laxton, Lilford-cum-Wigsthorpe, Little Addington, Little Harrowden, Little Irchester, Loddington, Lowick, Luddington, Lutton
- Mawsley, Mears Ashby, Middleton
- Nassington, Newton and Little Oakley, Newton Bromswold
- Orlingbury, Orton, Oundle
- Pilton, Polebrook, Pytchley
- Raunds, Ringstead, Rockingham, Rothwell, Rushden, Rushton
- Shotley, Southwick, Stanion, Stanwick, Stoke Doyle, Stoke Albany, Strixton, Sudborough, Sutton Bassett, Sywell
- Tansor, Thorpe Malsor, Thorpe Waterville, Thrapston, Thurning, Titchmarsh, Twywell
- Wadenhoe, Wakerley, Warkton, Warmington, Weekley, Weldon, Wellingborough, Weston by Welland, Wilbarston, Wilby, Wollaston, Woodford, Woodnewton
- Yarwell

== Media ==
In terms of television, the area is served by BBC East and ITV Anglia which broadcast from the Sandy Heath transmitter. The Waltham transmitter can also be received which broadcasts BBC East Midlands and ITV Central programmes.

Radio stations for the area are:

- BBC Radio Northampton on 103.6 FM
- BBC Radio Cambridgeshire on 95.7 FM
- Heart East on 96.6 FM
- Smooth East Midlands (formerly Connect FM) on 97.2 FM, 106.8 FM, and 107.4 FM

North Northamptonshire is served by the following local newspapers: Northamptonshire Evening Telegraph and Northampton Chronicle and Echo.

== See also ==
- 2019–2023 structural changes to local government in England
- 2021 North Northamptonshire Council election
- West Northamptonshire for the other unitary authority created in Northamptonshire in April 2021.
