= Geddington =

Village in Northamptonshire, England

Coordinates: 52.438°N 0.687°W

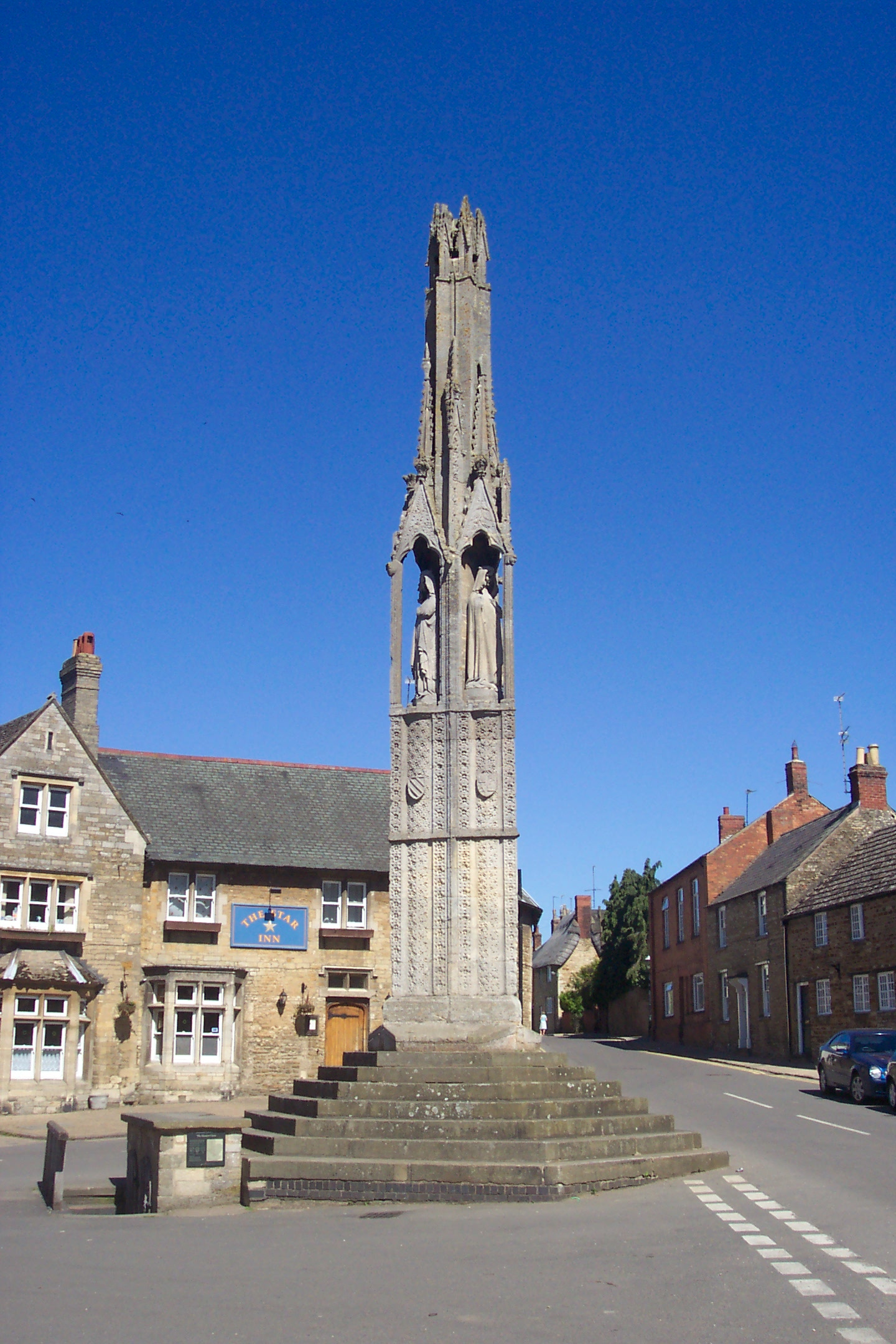
- The Geddington cross

- Location within Northamptonshire
- Population: 1,503 (2011)
- OS grid reference: SP8983
  - London: 85.5 miles (137.6 km)
- Unitary authority: North Northamptonshire
- Ceremonial county: Northamptonshire
- Region: East Midlands
- Country: England
- Sovereign state: United Kingdom
- Post town: Kettering
- Postcode district: NN14
- Dialling code: 01536
- Police: Northamptonshire
- Fire: Northamptonshire
- Ambulance: East Midlands
- UK Parliament: Kettering

Geddington is a village and civil parish on the A4300, previously A43, in North Northamptonshire between Kettering and Corby. The population of the civil parish at the 2011 census was 1,503, virtually unchanged from 1,504 at the 2001 census.

The villages name means "Farm/settlement connected Gaete" or "farm/settlement connected with Geiti". Alternatively, "goat place farm/settlement".

The village contains an Eleanor cross. The monument dates from 1294, when the crosses were raised as a memorial by Edward I (1239–1307) to his late wife, Eleanor of Castile (1241–1290). There were originally 12 monuments, one in each resting place of the funeral procession as they travelled to Westminster Abbey. The Geddington cross is one of only three Eleanor crosses still standing; the other two being in Hardingstone (near Northampton) and Waltham Cross, although remnants and reconstructions of the lost ones can also be seen at other sites. The Geddington cross is regarded as the best preserved.

The village was also formerly home to a Royal hunting lodge which was used as a base by monarchs for hunting within the Royal forest of Rockingham. The building has subsequently been lost; however, the "King's Door" within the church of St Mary Magdalene, Geddington in the village remains, it was the entrance through which the King could enter the building while staying at the lodge.

The old main road runs through the village and crosses the River Ise by a spectacular medieval bridge. The bridge, built in 1250, has five arches and three pedestrian refuges. A more recent ford also runs alongside the bridge. The village is famous for its annual boxing day squirt in which a barrel attached to a rope across the river is squirted from one side of the ford to the other by competing fire crews from Geddington and Kettering.

Geddington formerly had a working men's club and at least four public houses: The Royal Oak, The Star Inn, The White Hart and The White Lion. Only The Star Inn remains open. The village has one cafe/restaurant 'Café Oak'. The post office closed during the COVID 19 pandemic and has not re-opened. Geddington Cricket Club remains one of the main social clubs in the village and the bar is open regularly in the summer months.

== Transport ==
The nearest mainline railway station is Kettering railway station, a distance of 4.1 miles (7 km) from the village. Corby railway station is 5.1 miles (8 km) from the village.

There is a partial cycle path from the village to the nearby town of Kettering and the village of Weekley, but difficulty crossing the road at Weekley means cycling remains an underused mode of transportation.

== See also ==
- Duke of Buccleuch
