= Charles Wicksteed =

English Unitarian minister

Charles Wicksteed (1810–1885) was a Unitarian minister, part of the tradition of English Dissenters.

== Early life and education ==
Charles Wicksteed was born in Shrewsbury; his father was a manufacturer and his mother was descended from the great dissenting preacher Philip Henry (1631–1707). He was educated at Shrewsbury School, where he was taught by its headmaster, the classical scholar Samuel Butler. From there, with financial assistance from Dr. Williams's Trust, he went on to the University of Glasgow, graduating in 1831. He was following in the footsteps of his brilliant elder brother, but tragedy struck when Joseph Hartley Wicksteed drowned in a swimming accident in Scotland.

== Early career and arrival in Leeds ==
Charles Wicksteed's first appointment as a minister was to the so-called Ancient Chapel at Toxteth, then on the edge of the rapidly industrialising port city of Liverpool. In 1835 he took over the ministry at Mill Hill Chapel, at the very centre of Leeds and remained there for almost twenty years. Associated with the chapel were prominent merchants, industrialists, and politicians such as the Lupton family. The chapel became known punningly as "the mayors' nest", as so many mayors and later lord mayors belonged to it. During Wicksteed's tenure this included Darnton Lupton (1844) and Francis Garbutt (1847).

The Leeds Philosophical and Literary Society, a learned society founded in 1819 and which established the city's museum, drew many of its supporters from the chapel. "There was a careful consciousness of middle-class identity and independence...which combined easily with the utilitarian and scientific interests" of the Mill Hill congregation. Wicksteed served as president of the "Phil & Lit" from 1851-1854.

== Marriage and family connections ==
Two years after arriving in Leeds, he became connected with the Luptons, a prosperous mercantile dynasty of Unitarians long established in the city. He married Jane, and a few years later his sister Elizabeth married Jane's brother Arthur (1819-1867), also a Unitarian minister. Arthur was, according to a family history, "The Achilles of the Leeds Complete Suffrage Association"- in other words, a tragic champion of the fight for universal suffrage; see Chartism and Henry Vincent for more on the CSA. One of Charles's nephews by Elizabeth and Arthur was the maverick MP and mining engineer Arnold Lupton.

Charles's new cousins-in-law included Darnton, the mayor mentioned above; Francis, who married the educational reformer Frances Greenhow and himself co-founded the University of Leeds; and Joseph, a committed Liberal, on the executive of the National Reform Union. Jane was described as impractical but accomplished (sketching, painting, reciting poetry, etc.) and both the Wicksteed siblings as "Unitarians of vigorous mind and keen intelligence".

Charles and Jane had nine children, including Janet, who wrote, as Mrs Lewis, a memoir including her parents; Philip (Henry), the economist and Unitarian theologian; (Joseph) Hartley, president of the Institute of Mechanical Engineers; and Charles, also an engineer. The younger Charles in 1876 set up Charles Wicksteed & Co. Ltd, based in Digby Street in Kettering, which produced items such as the first hydraulic hacksaw, the original automatic gearbox, sawing machinery, wooden toys and power drills. To celebrate the end of the First World War, his factory purportedly removed a number of central heating pipes from its premises and used them to build swings for children, creating the first commercial playground. The success of the initiative eventually led to the founding of Wicksteed Playgrounds - the world's first playground manufacturing company, which is still operating. His main bequest was a park named after his family.

One of their grandchildren was Mary Cicely Wicksteed, who married the prominent Australian surgeon Sir Hibbert Alan Stephen Newton (1887-1949)

== Career ==
Wicksteed worked closely with three ministers in particular: John Hamilton Thom, whom he had succeeded at Toxteth, James Martineau, to whom he was related by marriage, and John James Tayler. They were known as the Quarternion. For ten years they jointly edited the Prospective Review, " the influential voice of the ‘new school’ of English Unitarianism, as against the older tradition of eighteenth-century Priestleyanism" They "were central figures in the adoption of neo-Gothic architecture" in the new chapels that were being built - what is now called Dissenting Gothic.

He co-founded the Leeds Education Society, a precursor to the National Education League. His cousin-in-law Frances Lupton was also an educational reformer, along similar lines.

Wicksteed interested himself in the anti-slavery movement. His cousin by marriage Joseph Lupton, later president of the training college for Dissenting ministers, joined with him in being "ardent admirers" of the campaigner William Lloyd Garrison, who advocated immediate, not gradual, abolition.

== Later life and death ==
Ill health led to an early retirement from Leeds in 1854, and Wicksteed spent some years farming in Wales, during which time he wrote a history of Mill Hill Chapel. He took up another ministry in Liverpool, in the now vanished Hope Street Chapel, situated assertively near Liverpool Cathedral (of the established church) and also near the newly chosen site for the Roman Catholic Liverpool Metropolitan Cathedral. He shared the pulpit with the young Alexander Gordon.

Wicksteed then travelled around the country preaching in his latter years, eventually retiring for a second and final time to Croydon, where he died on 19 April 1885. He was buried in Norwood Cemetery, London.

His entry in the Dictionary of National Biography, by the American historian of Britain R. K. Webb, calls Wicksteed "an erudite and thoughtful man and a popular and important preacher".
