= Charles Wicksteed (engineer) =

British engineer (1847–1931)

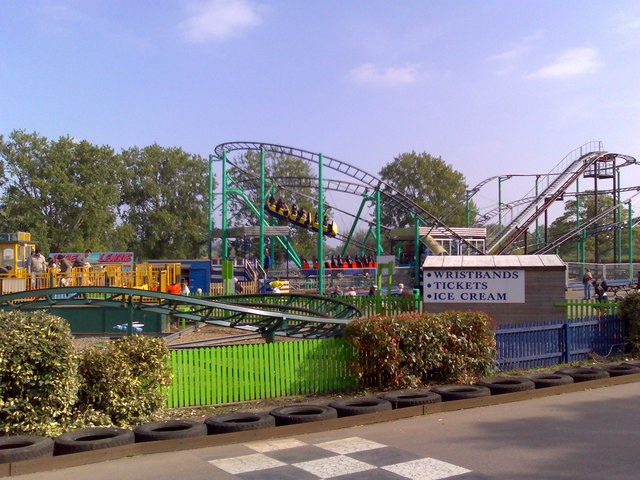
A ride at Wicksteed Park

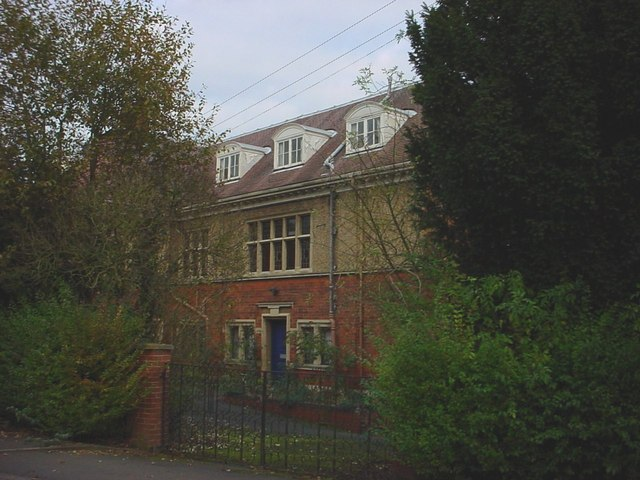
Bryn Hafod - Wicksteed's house in Kettering, designed by John Alfred Gotch

Charles Wicksteed (1847–1931) was a British engineer, businessman, and entrepreneur. He is best known as a manufacturer of playground equipment and as the founder of Wicksteed Park in Kettering.

== Biography ==
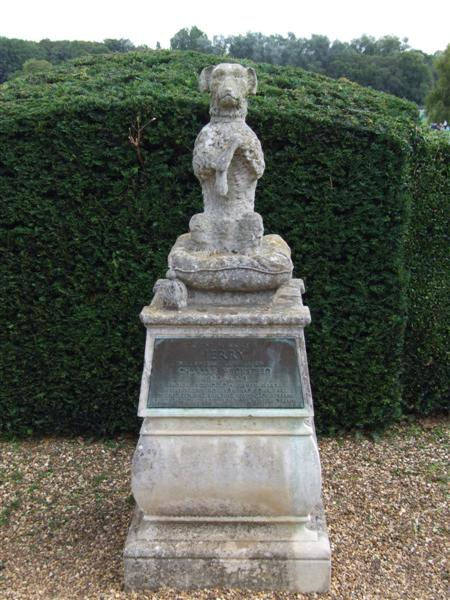
Monument to Wicksteed's dog, Jerry

Wicksteed was born in Leeds in 1847. His father was Charles Wicksteed, a Unitarian minister and his mother was Jane Lupton. His parents met when Charles senior arrived in Leeds in 1835 to lead Mill Hill Chapel, at the heart of that industrial city, and two years later they married.

Wicksteed was one of nine children. Sisters included Janet, who wrote a memoir under the name of Mrs Arthur Lewis. Brothers included Philip (Henry), the economist and Unitarian theologian, and Joseph, president of the Institute of Mechanical Engineers, whose daughter Mary Cicely married the Australian surgeon Sir Alan Newton. They had the maverick MP and mining engineer Arnold Lupton as their first cousin.

At the age of 16, Wicksteed accepted an apprenticeship at locomotive manufacturer Kitson & Hewitson. When he was 21, Wicksteed founded Charles Wicksteed and Co., Ltd., a steam plough contracting business. Initially based in Norfolk, he moved operations to Kettering in 1872. In 1876, he established an engineering workshop called the Stamford Road Works. The firm was successful, and he sold his ploughing business in 1894.

In 1907, Wicksteed's firm developed a motor car transmission. Although considered a noteworthy invention, it was a commercial failure. Wicksteed then pivoted to power tools, including hydraulic hacksaw and circular saw machines. These inventions were successful and subsequently mass produced. During the First World War, Wicksteed principally manufactured munitions, gauges, and gears for the war effort.

In the early twentieth century, he a wrote several pamphlets on topics including agricultural labour, capital, and what he called 'the farce of nationalisation' of the coal board.

Wicksteed died by suicide at his home in Kettering on 19 March 1931, shortly before his 84th birthday.

== Wicksteed Park ==
In 1914, Wicksteed purchased land on the edge of Kettering and, inspired by garden city advocate Ebenezer Howard, set about creating the Barton Seagrave garden suburb. Architects Gotch & Saunders worked with Wicksteed to develop plans, including a large park at the centre of the estate. However, Wicksteed's attention soon focused on making the park a better place for children to play and in time he developed robust swings, slides and other playground equipment.

Wicksteed Park opened in 1921 and the children's playground soon became the central feature. In contrast to earlier thinking about playgrounds, which emphasised the segregation of girls and boys at play, Wicksteed encouraged children and adults to play together, opened the playground on Sundays and limited rules and regulations. Inspired by Edwardian amusement park rides, he created equipment including the jazz swing and ocean wave, alongside more traditional swings and slides. The Wicksteed Park Archive has many historic playground photos available online.

As Wicksteed set about improving the play equipment in his park, he also turned his playground inventions into commercial products that would soon be sold across the country and the world. By the 1950s, his products had been sold in Canada, New Zealand, India, Hong Kong, Malta, the West Indies, North Borneo, Southern Rhodesia and St Helena, as well as the Belgian Congo, Venezuela and the USA.

In 2013, a prototype swing of his was unearthed near Wicksteed Park dating back to the early 1920s. It is believed to be the UK's oldest working swing. As of 2022, Wicksteed Leisure Limited continues to manufacture play equipment.

== Wicksteed Charitable Trust ==
The Wicksteed Charitable Trust, established to manage Charles Wicksteed's charitable legacy has been run by his descendants to the present. However, the organisation has twice been investigated by the Charity Commission first in 2004 and again in 2021/2022. The regulator did find significant regulatory issues with the Trust, at this Oliver Wicksteed declined to step down from his role in the Trust, or his role as a Deputy Lieutenant of Northamptonshire, despite these failures. As of 2023 further complaints were lodged with the Charity Commission including claims the Trust falsified information provided to the 2022 Charity Commission Investigation. On 15 September 2023 Robert Hunt, a member of the Wicksteed family, was terminated as Managing Director of Wicksteed Park following a very brief tenure.
