= Kettering Grammar School =

Location
- Kettering, Northamptonshire, NN15 6PH; England; 52.3887°N 0.7108°W

Information
- Type: Grammar school
- Closed: 1976 (completely in 1993)
- Local authority: Northamptonshire
- Gender: Boys
- Age: 11 to 18
- Publication: The Cytringanian
- Website: http://www.cytringanians.co.uk

Kettering Grammar School was a boys' grammar school (selective) that had a number of homes in Kettering, Northamptonshire throughout its history.

== History ==
The school was based in a building in Gold Street which, together with the master's house, was completed in 1857. It then relocated to Bowling Green Road, a building designed by John Alfred Gotch in the neoclassical style and completed in 1913. The building was occupied on the left side by Kettering High School (for girls) and on the right side by Kettering Grammar School (for boys).

After the school moved to Windmill Avenue, to the east of the town north of Wicksteed Park, in 1965, the Bowling Green Road building became the Kettering Municipal Offices.

=== Comprehensive ===
In later years the Windmill Avenue buildings housed Kettering Boys School, with many of the same teachers as the Grammar School but no longer selective, and now part of the area's Comprehensive education system. It operated on two sites – a lower and upper school. The Kettering High School became Kettering School for Girls on Lewis Road (near Wicksteed Park) and then Southfield School for Girls on Lewis Road.

=== Further education college ===
The Windmill Avenue site has been occupied by Tresham College of Further and Higher Education, (Kettering Campus), since 1993. The former Grammar School buildings were knocked down in 2007 to make way for the Tresham's new block.

== Headteachers ==
- Tom Bowker, the head of the boys' comprehensive from 1976, was the former head of Queen Elizabeth's High School, a coeducational grammar school in Gainsborough, Lincolnshire, and a Cambridge-educated Maths teacher. His wife Jean Bowker, who taught in Corby, stood unsuccessfully for Lib-SDP Alliance in May 1987, in the local council, in the same ward as Phil Hope. She worked with Inner Wheel and the Methodists. Bowker retired aged 60 in March 1989. His teacher wife Jean disliked the new CTC for Corby.

== Space research ==
In the 1960s, Geoffrey Perry, head of the school Physics department experimented with using satellite signals and the Doppler effect as an aid to teaching. The activity soon grew into regular monitoring of Soviet-launched satellites and expanded into an international collaboration that became known as the Kettering Group. The group was headed by Perry, who by then had become Head of Science Teaching. On the technical front Perry was partnered by the head of the chemistry department, Derek Slater – a Radio Amateur, G3FOZ.

The activities of Perry and his team created considerable interest: an article which had been published in Aviation Week magazine in 1957 revealed that the U.S. had been tracking Russian missile launches from advanced long-range radar units in Turkey. The article caused a furore, with President Dwight D. Eisenhower's special assistant for National Security Affairs, Robert Cutler, referring to the article as "treasonable". It was claimed that the story started with Perry and his students and that Perry had advised a writer at the magazine that a radar in Turkey was doing important space intel tracking, so the writer dug deeper into the story. A Kettering contribution to the 1957 story would not have been possible at the time because the tracking team was not formed until 1964 and its analyses of the Soviet space programme only started to appear a couple years later.

In 1966 the project went international when Swedish student Sven Grahn contacted the group with a recording of the signals from Kosmos 104. The same year it discovered Soviet launches from Plesetsk Cosmodrome, officially unacknowledged until 1983.

In 1969, a group used simple radio equipment to monitor the Apollo 11 mission and calculated its orbits. According to the group, in December 1972 a member "pick[ed] up Apollo 17 on its way to the Moon".

In 1973 the group tracked Skylab and in July 1975, the team supported ITN in their coverage of the Soyuz – Apollo link up which took place 140 miles over Bognor Regis on 17 July 1975.

In 1978 the group predicted the crash of Kosmos 954 spacecraft.

In May 1985, Geoffrey Perry talked about the project in the Radio 4 programme The Kettering Project. In March 1987, Channel 4 featured the Group in the programme Sputniks, Bleeps & Mr Perry.

Pictures of the school's space tracking team, originally published in The Times newspaper, would later find their way onto record covers of The Wonder Stuff for their album, Construction for the Modern Idiot.

== Notable alumni ==
- H. E. Bates – writer
- Thomas Cooper Gotch – painter
- Jim Dale – entertainer
- John Gill – theologian
- Sir Kenneth Parker – High Court Judge
- Phil Sawford – Labour MP from 1997 to 2005 for Kettering
- Kenneth Woolmer, Baron Woolmer of Leeds – Labour MP from 1979 to 1983 for Batley and Morley
- Tony Wright – Labour MP from 1997 to 2010 for Cannock Chase and from 1992 to 1997 for Cannock and Burntwood

== See also ==
- Satellite watching
- British space programme
- John M. Steane (born 1931), headmaster 1964–1976
