= Kettering Half Marathon and 5K =

Annual foot race in England

Kettering 5k & Half Marathon
- Event type: Road Running
- Distance: 5K & Half Marathon
- Established: 2025
- Organizer: RunThrough
- Website: https://www.runkettering.com/

Kettering Half Marathon and 5K is an annual road running event held in Kettering, Northamptonshire, England. The 2025 edition took place on 9 March 2025 and was organised by RunThrough in partnership with Kettering Town Council and is licensed through RunBritain/UK Athletics.

The event offers two distances: a half marathon of 13.1 miles (21.1 km) and a 5-kilometre race. Both start and finish at Wicksteed Park. The course is run on closed roads and includes a loop through Kettering town centre, sections passing Boughton House, and rural lanes before returning to Wicksteed Park.

== Background ==
Kettering Town Council partnered with running event organiser RunThrough to bring a large-scale road race to the town for the first time. Craig Skinner, Mayor of Kettering, said the event was going to "introduce a lot of people to Kettering and show off all the best bits of our area."

The event had first been discussed in 2023 as organisers explored options for a large-scale race in the town, before being formally confirmed in June 2024 when entries opened for the inaugural race.

Alongside the half marathon and 5K, organisers initially indicated that shorter fun runs and a 10-kilometre race could also be added to the event.

== History ==
=== 2025 edition ===
The first edition took place on Sunday 9 March 2025, the first half marathon to be held in Kettering. More than 1,500 people had signed up ahead of race day. A total of 2,182 runners participated: 1,896 in the half marathon and 286 in the 5K.

Mayor Craig Skinner, who ran the course himself, encouraged residents to line the route and support participants, saying: "It makes all the difference when you are running to hear some support."

Spectators and volunteers lined the route, with live music provided at the Market Place by ISM Music Academy.

Ahead of the race, the BBC reported that organisers had offered free entry to residents living along the route, as an acknowledgement of disruption caused by road closures.

The offer applied to anyone directly affected, including those in properties at Ise Lodge, Hanwood Park, and Warkton. Rob Sullivan, head of operations at RunThrough, described it as "a token of our appreciation of your understanding of the slight disruptions caused by this event."

=== 2026 edition ===
Following the first edition of the event, organisers confirmed the race would return on 8 March 2026.

The Northamptonshire Telegraph reported in July 2025 that entries had opened, with both distances again offered on the same course, organised by RunThrough on behalf of Kettering Town Council.

The half marathon was open to those aged 17 and above, and the 5K to those aged 11 and above.

The 2026 course mirrored the 2025 route, with the 5K following a loop through Kettering town centre and the half marathon again heading to the grounds of Boughton House before finishing at Wicksteed Park.

==== Results/participation ====
A total of 2,329 runners completed the 2026 race: 335 in the 5K and 1,994 in the half marathon. The event marked the second running of the race and was described as having become an established fixture on the Kettering calendar.

== Course ==
The half marathon route leaves Wicksteed Park, passes through Kettering town centre and the grounds of Boughton House, and continues through rural lanes via Grafton Underwood and Cranford. The final stretch includes a climb up Barton Hill and returns to the park. The 5K follows a shorter loop through the town centre.

The course is marked at each kilometre with distance flags, marshals stationed throughout, and road closures required. Because it is designed as a single lap, roads are reopened progressively as the final runners pass each section.

== 2025 results ==
The half marathon was won by Michael Aldridge of Northampton in a time of 1:13:06. Aldridge, who was 51 at the time, described the course as "brutally hilly" but noted the level of crowd support along the route. Callum Ely finished second in 1:13:15 and Ned Gilford third in 1:13:57.

The 5K was won by Casey Stevenson of Kettering Town Harriers in a time of 16 minutes and 7 seconds. Ollie Hayward of Uppingham School finished second and Robert Dunne of Corby third.
