= Bishop Stopford School =

Location
- Headlands; Kettering, Northamptonshire, NN15 6BJ; England; 52.3861°N 0.7272°W

Information
- Type: Secondary Academy
- Motto: Faith. Justice. Responsibility. Truth. Compassion.
- Religious affiliation: Church of England
- Established: 1965; 61 years ago
- Department for Education URN: 137086 Tables
- Ofsted: Reports
- Head teacher: Jill Silverthorne
- Gender: Mixed
- Age: 11 to 18
- Enrolment: 1459
- Houses: North (Durham & York), South (Canterbury & Winchester), East (Ely & Peterborough), West (Gloucester, Salisbury)
- Colours: Royal Blue; Gold; Black
- Publication: KeyNotes, BSS World of Writing
- Forms: Canterbury, Durham, Ely, Gloucester, Peterborough, Salisbury, Winchester, York
- Former Forms: Lincolnshire
- Bands: Band 1 (Canterbury, Durham, Winchester, York) & Band 2 (Ely, Gloucester, Peterborough, Salisbury)
- Website: http://www.bishopstopford.com

Bishop Stopford School is a secondary school and sixth form with academy status in Kettering, Northamptonshire, England.

The school is located in the Headlands, Kettering. The current headteacher is Jill Silverthorne. Former students of Bishop Stopford are known as Old Stopfordians.

== History ==
Bishop Stopford School was founded in 1965 as a purpose-built Secondary Modern institution, as a replacement for its precursor, a school founded in 1535 by the rector of St Peter and St Paul's Church, Kettering. The former bishop of Peterborough, Robert Stopford, agreed to the new school being named after him. Bishop Stopford School soon introduced a sixth form and admitted its first fully comprehensive intake in 1976.

On 23 May 2012, Bishop Stopford opened an extension to the sixth-form, with a study area, two seminar rooms and an additional classroom.

The number on roll has more than doubled since 1965 to approximately 1450 students, with a sixth form of approximately 400.

The school converted to academy status in August 2011.

Previous headteachers were Pat Partridge until 1974, Trevor Hopkins until 1998, James Colquhoun until 2001, and Margaret Holman from 2001 to 2018, and Jill Silverthorne from 2018 to now.

== Sixth form ==
Bishop Stopford School Sixth Form has approximately 400 students and offers 25 A Level subjects.

== School performance and inspections ==
The school was inspected by Ofsted in 2022, with a judgement of Requires Improvement. As of 2026, the school's most recent inspection was in 2025, with four of the five areas judged as Outstanding, and the fifth, the sixth form provision, judged as Good.

== Subjects ==
At a base level students study maths, English, science, Physical Education, Spanish or French (studied in alternating years e.g. a Year 8 in 2023 studied French but a Year 9 in 2023 would study Spanish and both would study these for the whole school), PSHE, and Religious Education. Additional subjects in Year 7 include: Library, GRIT (Great Respect In Teams), and Foundation learning (also studied in Year 8).

=== GCSEs ===
Every student must study English, maths, science, Spanish or French (as explained above), and Religious Education. Options include Geography, History, Physical Education, Design Technology, Food, Spanish or French, Computing, Art, Health and Social Care, and Music.

== Notable former pupils ==
- Rosie Wrighting, Labour MP for Kettering
