= Kingsthorpe College =

Location
- Boughton Green Road; Northampton, Northamptonshire, NN2 7HR; England
- Coordinates: 52°16′16″N 0°53′13″W

Information
- Type: Academy
- Motto: Dream big work hard stay humble
- Local authority: West Northamptonshire
- Department for Education URN: 138932 Tables
- Gender: Mixed
- Age: 11 to 18
- Enrolment: 1450
- Colour: Blue Purple Yellow
- Website: https://www.kingsthorpecollege.org.uk/

Kingsthorpe College is a secondary school in Northampton, England. Formerly Kingsthorpe Community College (and before that, Kingsthorpe Upper School), it now has academy status. In September 2021 Kingsthorpe College joined the Orbis Education Trust, a multi-academy trust, which also includes Southfield School in Kettering. As of 2023, the school has approximately 1,400 students on roll, with 160 in the sixth form.

The school moved into a new building in 2007, and is located on a single site on Boughton Green Road in the suburb of Kingsthorpe. It was previously split on two sites, the other being next to Welford Road, which was on the A5199 road. The college has been a specialist sports college with a second specialism in history since 2006, after changing from a Language College and a former ICT College.

== Ofsted judgements ==
In 2013 Ofsted said the school required improvement. In 2015 and again in 2019 it was judged Good.

== Notable alumni ==
- Ben Cohen, rugby player
- Gian Sammarco, actor
- Marc Warren, actor
- Callum Robinson, footballer
