= Kettering Library, Northamptonshire =

Public Library in Kettering, England

Coordinates: 52.3963°N 0.7275°W

Kettering Library
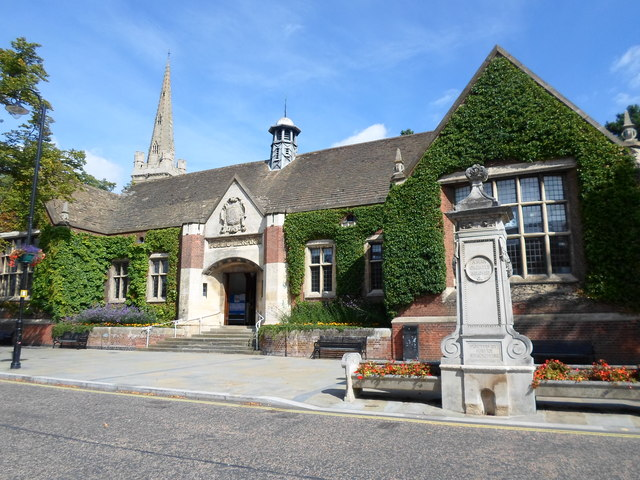
- Location: United Kingdom
- Established: 1904

Kettering Library is a public library in Kettering, England, situated in the centre of the town between Market Place and St Peter and St Paul's Church.

== History ==
The library building was designed by architects J. Goddard, A. H. Paget and W. A. Catlow. It opened in 1904 and was refurbished in 2012–13. In 1913, the library expanded as a new art gallery complex, the Alfred East Gallery, was built to the side of the main building.

In 1976, the library was given a Grade II listing.

== Architecture ==
The library main building is made out of red Sandstock bricks that came from Hemel Hempstead. The stone is Ketton, from Edith Weston Quarries, and the roof is slated with Collyweston stone slate.

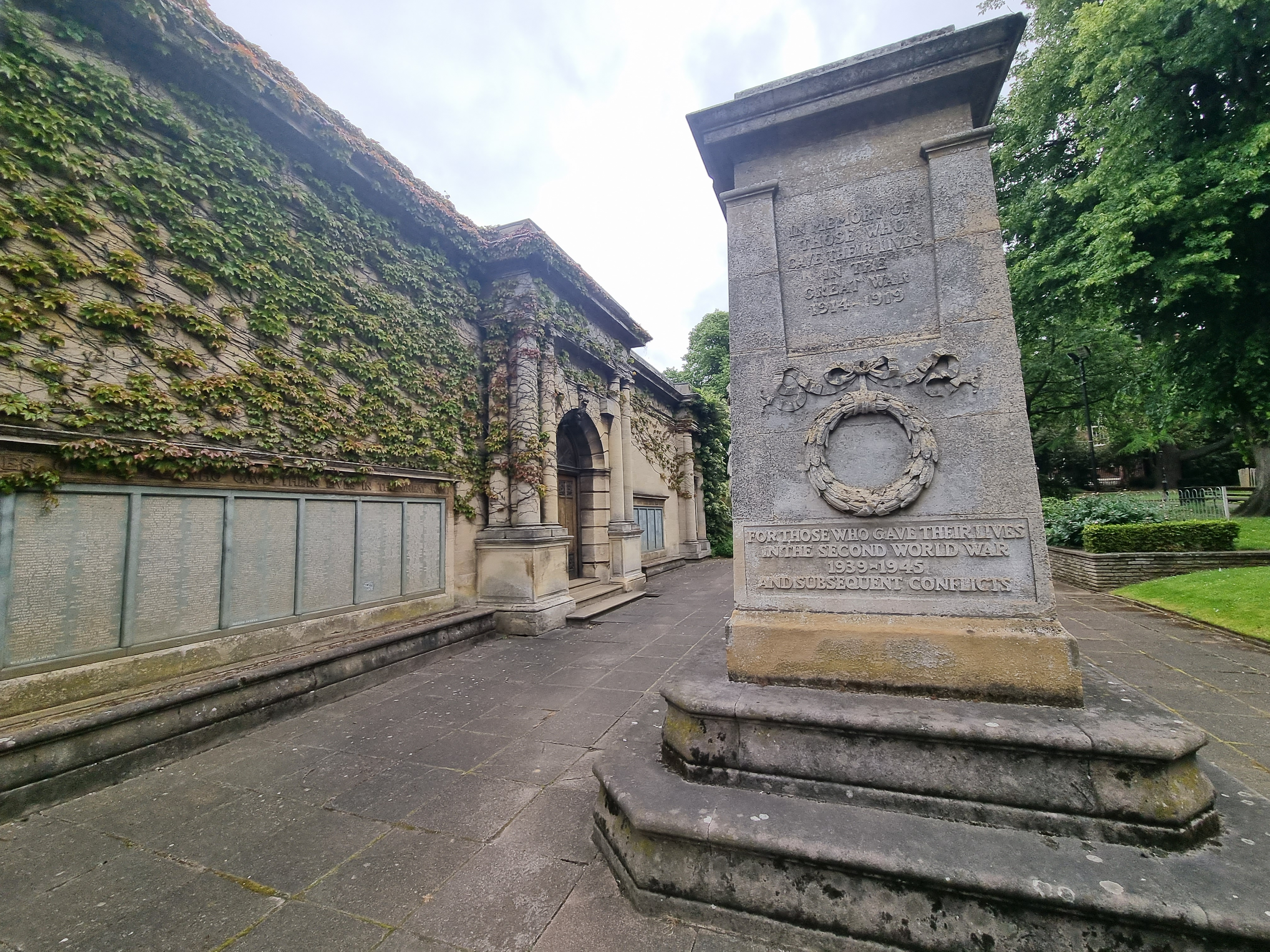
World War II Memorial

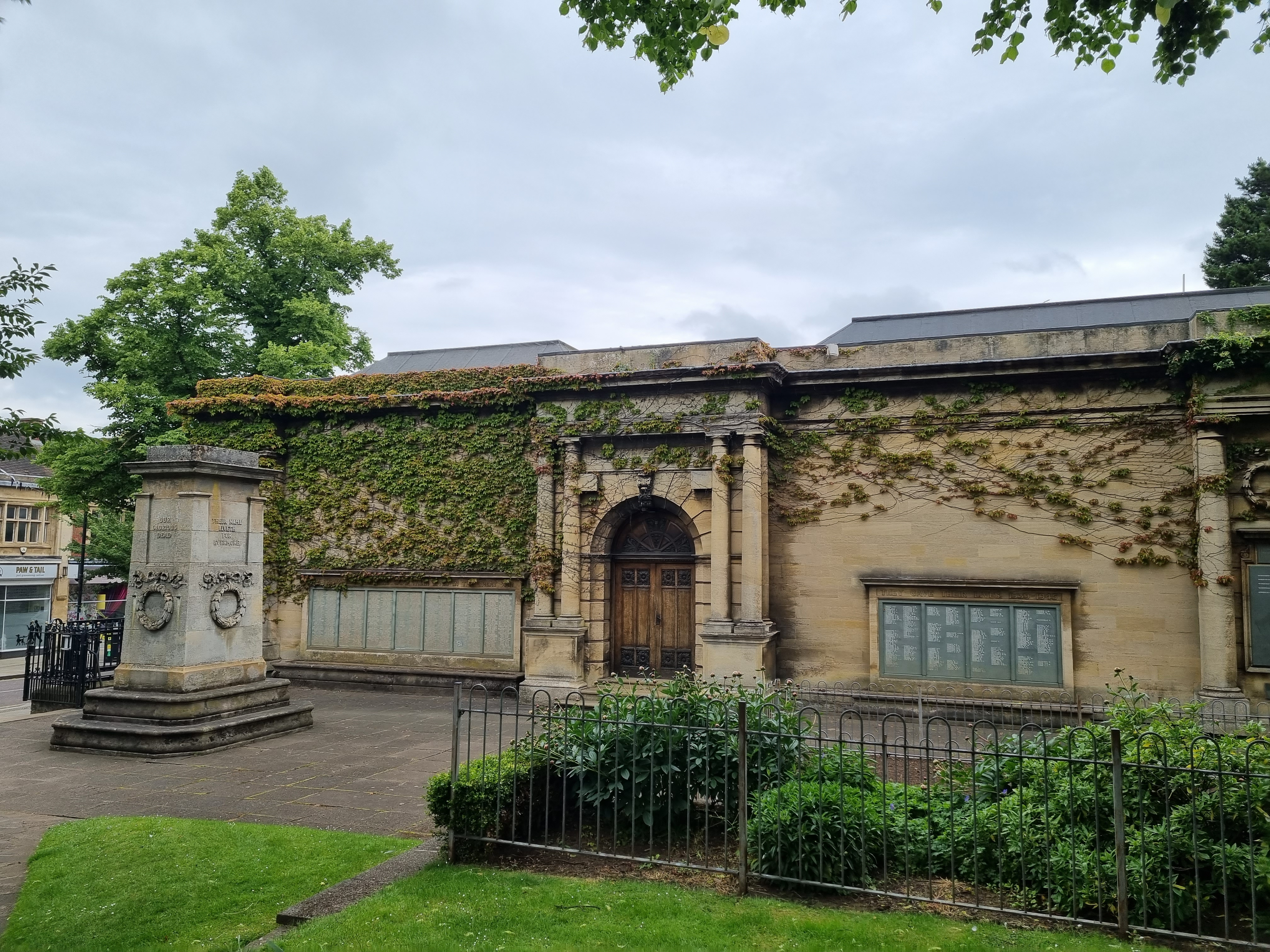
Library from the west

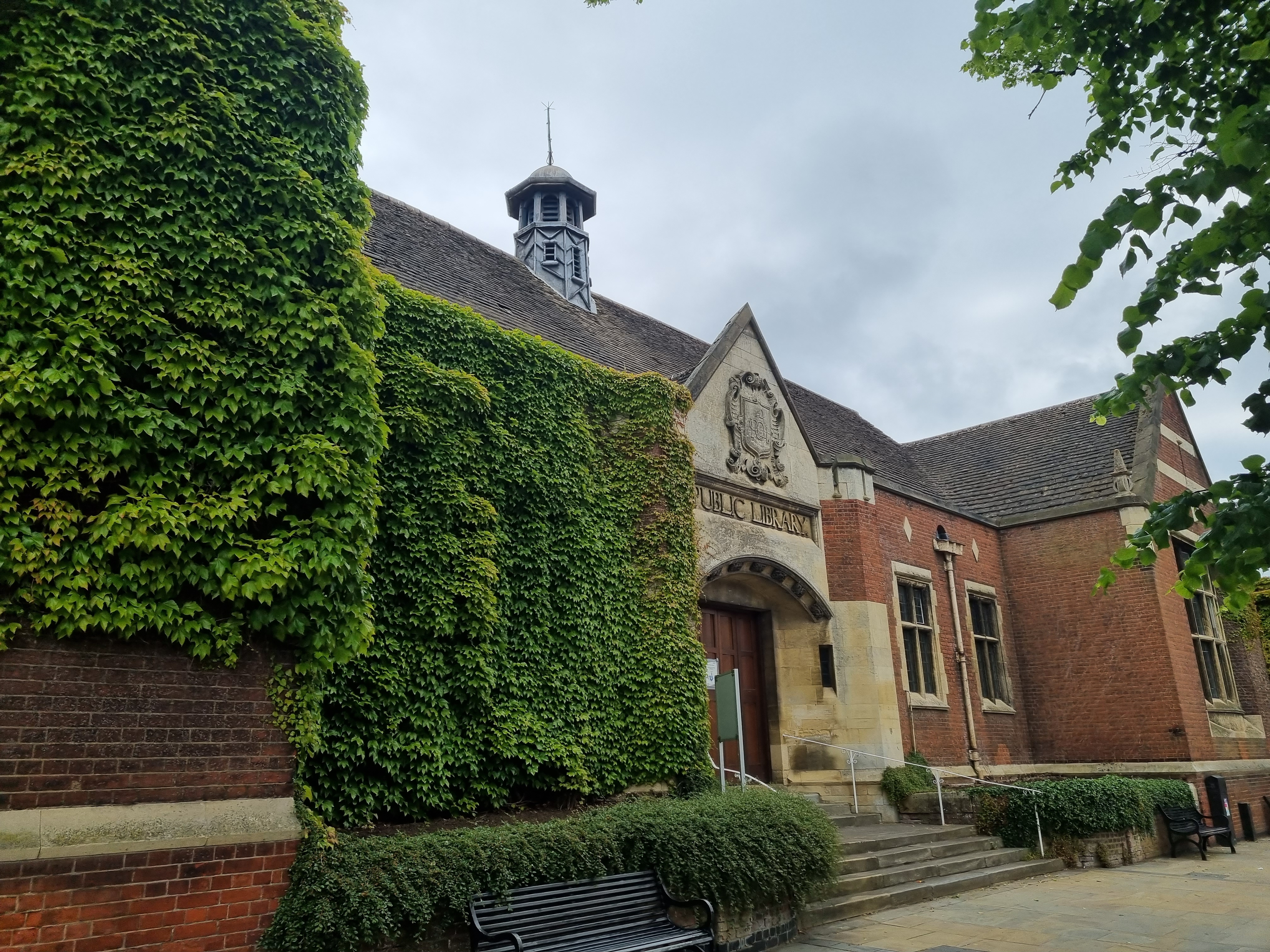
Main entrance
