= Kettering Municipal Offices =

Municipal building in Kettering, Northamptonshire, England

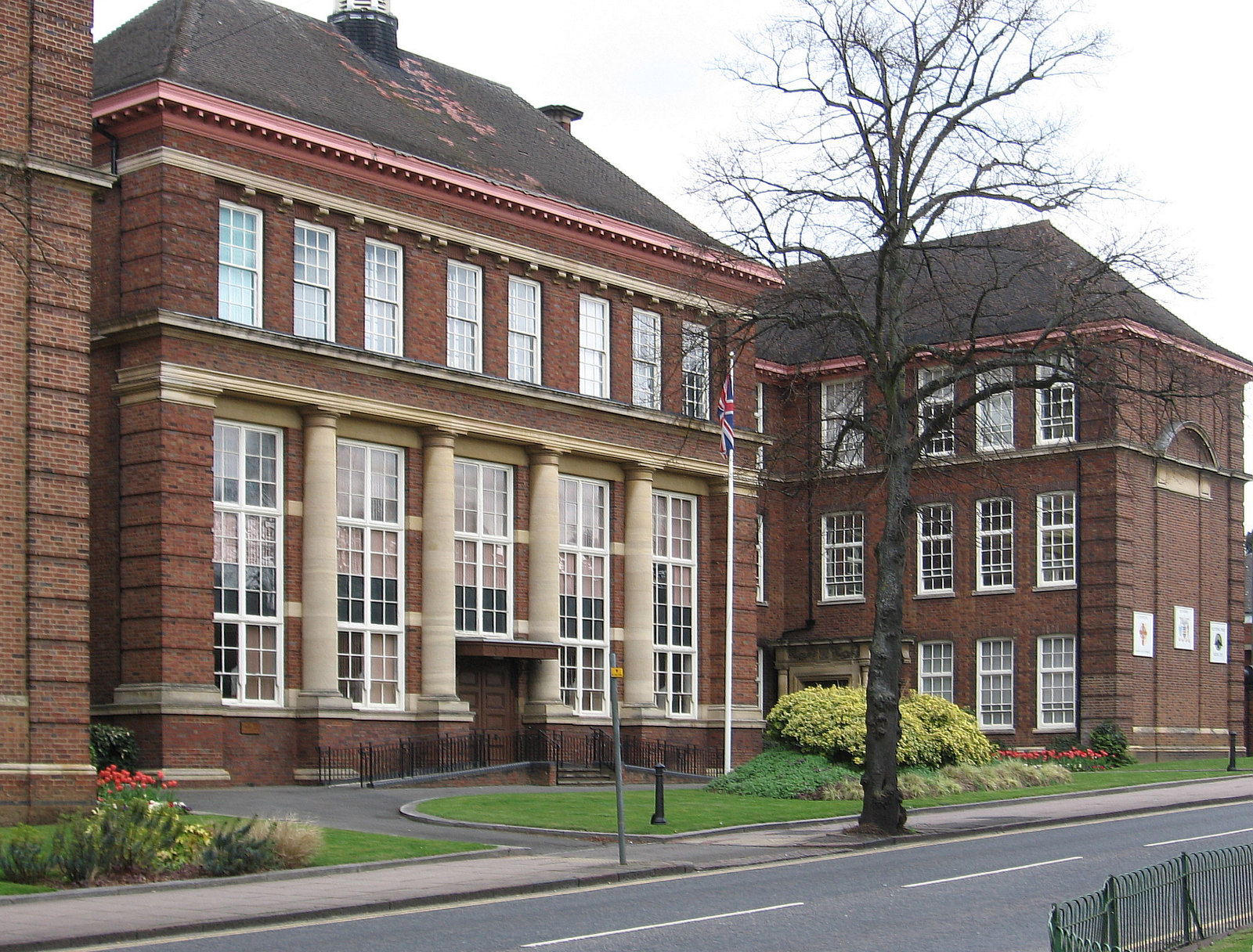
- Kettering Municipal Offices

- Shown in Northamptonshire
- 52.3959°N 0.7263°W
- Location: Bowling Green Road, Kettering

History
- Built: 1913

Site notes
- Architect: John Alfred Gotch
- Architectural style: Neo-Georgian style

The Municipal Offices is a municipal building in Bowling Green Road in Kettering, Northamptonshire, England. The building is used as an area office for North Northamptonshire Council.

== History ==
Following significant population growth, largely associated with the status of Kettering as a market town, the area became a local government district in 1872, governed by a local board. Such local government districts were reconstituted as urban districts in 1894. From 1872 until 1904 meetings were held at the Corn Exchange. In 1904 the council moved its meeting place to Stamford Road School (now the William Knibb Centre). The council's offices also outgrew the limited space at the corn exchange and were subsequently distributed to various buildings across the town. The urban district was advanced to the status of municipal borough in 1938.

After Kettering Grammar School relocated from its premises at Bowling Green Road to new premises at Windmill Avenue in 1965, the council took the opportunity to acquire the vacant building in Bowling Green Road to bring its offices and meeting place together in a single building. The building had been designed by John Alfred Gotch in the Neo-Georgian style, built in red brick with stone facings and had been completed in 1913. After conversion works the former school buildings were opened as the council's headquarters in 1966.

The design involved a symmetrical main frontage with thirteen bays facing onto Bowling Green Road with the end bays projected forward as pavilions; the central section of five bays, which slightly projected forward, featured a short flight of steps leading up to a doorway; there was a casement window on the first floor. The other bays in the central section featured tall casement windows flanked by Doric order columns, spanning the ground and first floors, and which supported a stone frieze, a brick entablature and a cornice. The second floor was fenestrated by a row of eight windows and was surmounted by a modillioned frieze, a brick entablature and a modillioned cornice and, at roof level, a lantern was installed. The end bays were blind but featured stone arches at second floor level. The old school hall was converted into a council chamber and a porch was added when the former school was converted for municipal use in 1965.

A plaque was placed on the eastern end bay to reflect the twinning agreement that the council had entered into with Lahnstein in Germany a few years previously. The municipal building continued to serve as local seat of government after the enlarged Kettering Borough Council was formed in 1974 and another plaque was added to the eastern end bay after Kettering became a sister city to Kettering, Ohio in the United States in 1978. The building was reduced to the status of an area office for North Northamptonshire Council after the new council was formed with its headquarters in Corby in 2021. The building also briefly served as headquarters for the new Kettering Town Council established as part of the 2021 reforms, until the town council moved to other premises in the town in 2022.
