= Rosie Wrighting =

British politician

Rosie Wrighting MP
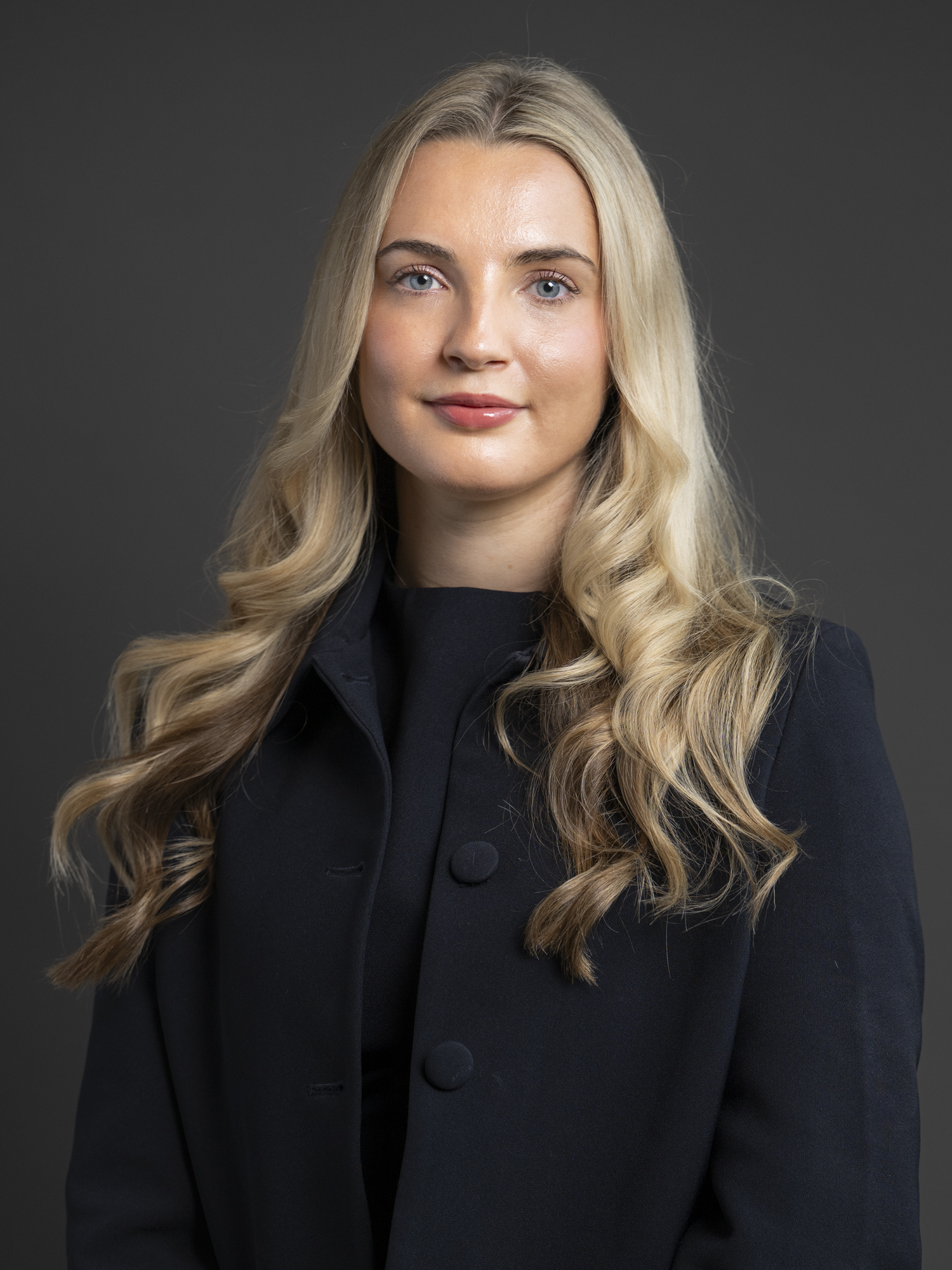
- Official portrait, 2024

Member of Parliament for Kettering
- Incumbent
- Assumed office 4 July 2024
- Preceded by: Philip Hollobone
- Majority: 3,820 (7.8%)

Personal details
- Born: Rosie May Wrighting; 28 July 1997 (age 29) Kettering, Northamptonshire, England
- Party: Labour
- Education: University of Westminster (BA)

Rosie May Wrighting (born 28 July 1997) is a British Labour Party politician and former fashion buyer who has served as Member of Parliament for Kettering since 2024. At the age of 26, she was the youngest female MP elected at the 2024 general election.

== Early life ==
Wrighting was born in Kettering, Northamptonshire to Cindy Wrighting. Her mother has been the chief executive officer of youth charity Youth Works.

Wrighting grew up in Geddington and was educated at Bishop Stopford School and Montsaye Academy. She studied Fashion at the University of Westminster.

== Career ==
Wrighting joined the Labour Party in 2020 at the age of 22 while studying at university and became chair of the Westminster North Constituency Labour Party. She unsuccessfully stood for election to the Little Venice ward in the 2022 Westminster City Council election. In November 2023, she was selected as the prospective parliamentary candidate for Kettering. Prior to her political career, Wrighting worked as a buyer for online fashion retailer ASOS before leaving to focus on her campaign full time.

In an interview with The Daily Telegraph, Wrighting described wanting more opportunities for people in her community as the motivation for standing as a prospective parliamentary candidate for Labour, specifically on housing and economic security. She has also said she wants to focus on improving access to mental health services, including for young people.

In November 2024, Wrighting announced that she would vote in favour of the assisted dying bill.

In September 2025, Wrighting was appointed as parliamentary private secretary to the then Secretary of State for Health and Social Care, Wes Streeting. Wrighting remained in this role until 15 May 2026 when she announced via X (formerly Twitter) that she was resigning.

This came following the resignations of several junior ministers on 12 May 2026, including; Miatta Fahnbulleh who resigned from the position of Parliamentary Under-Secretary of State for Devolution, Faith and Communities and Jess Phillips who resigned as Parliamentary Under-Secretary of State for Safeguarding and Violence Against Women and Girls. These resignations arose following growing calls from within and out the Labour Party for Prime Minister Keir Starmer to resign following Labour's significant losses in the 2026 local elections. On 14 May 2026, Wes Streeting resigned as Health Secretary.

On 16 May 2026, Wrighting spoke at the Progress think tank conference held in London, Wes Streeting gave his first speech after his resignation at the same conference. Streeting would later confirm after his speech that he would run in a Labour leadership contest if one was triggered..

On 17 July 2026, following the formation of the Burnham ministry, after Wes Streeting was appointed as Secretary of State for Defence under Andy Burnham, Wrighting was reappointed as one of Streeting's PPS in the Ministry of Defence.

Parliament of the United Kingdom
Preceded by Philip Hollobone	Member of Parliament for Kettering; 2024–present	Incumbent
