= Warkton =

Village in Northamptonshire, England

Coordinates: 52.4079°N 0.6882°W

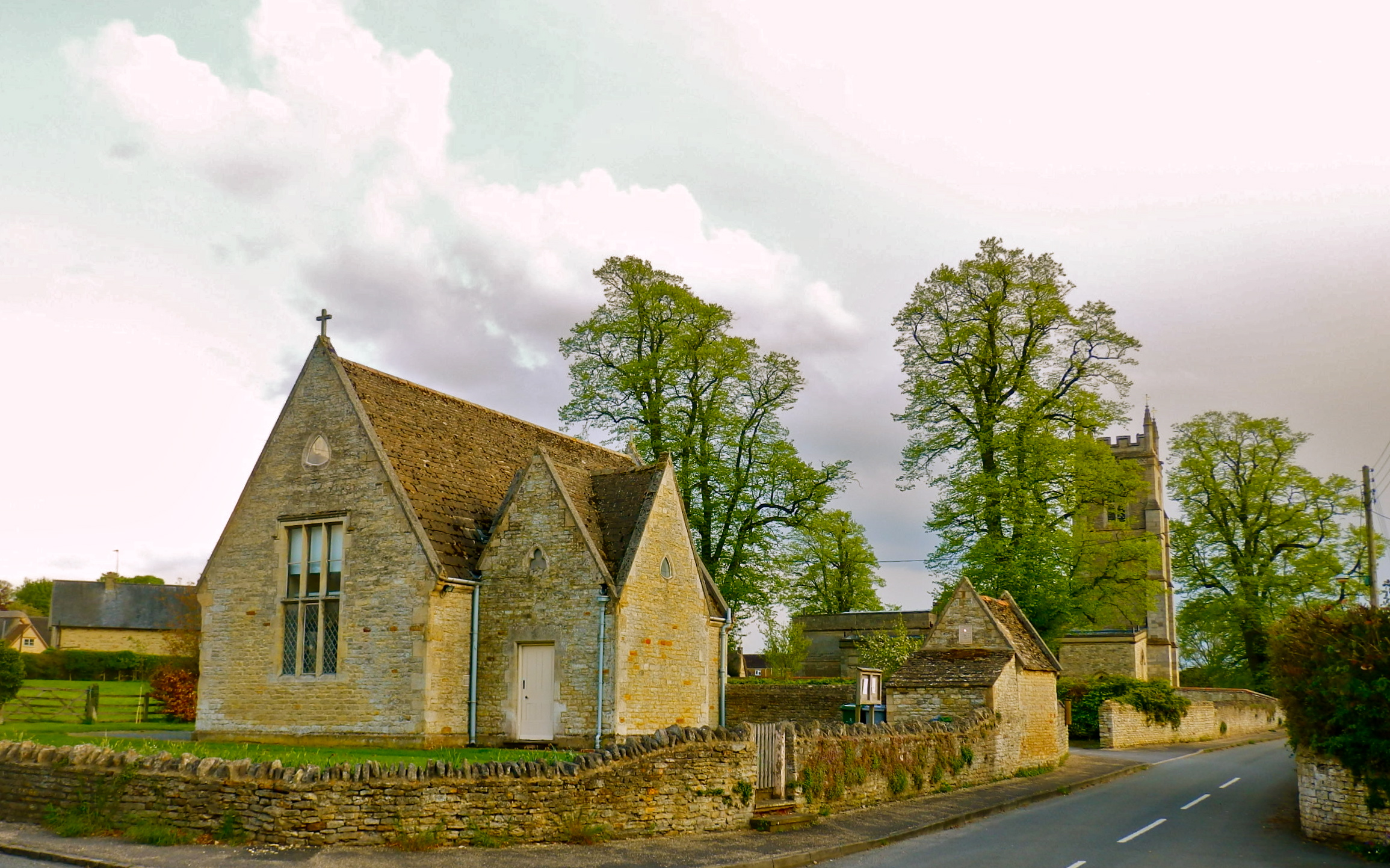
- Village hall and parish church of St Edmund

- Location within Northamptonshire
- Population: 146 (2021)
- OS grid reference: SP8979
- Unitary authority: North Northamptonshire
- Ceremonial county: Northamptonshire
- Region: East Midlands
- Country: England
- Sovereign state: United Kingdom
- Post town: Kettering
- Postcode district: NN16
- Dialling code: 01536
- Police: Northamptonshire
- Fire: Northamptonshire
- Ambulance: East Midlands
- UK Parliament: Kettering

Warkton is a small nucleated village and civil parish in the English county of Northamptonshire. It is approximately three miles north-east of the town of Kettering and seven miles west-northwest of Thrapston, and forms part of North Northamptonshire. At the time of the 2001 census, the parish's population was 144 people, reducing slightly to 136 at the 2011 Census.

The village's name means 'Farm/settlement which is connected to a man named Weorc(a)'.

The Grade I listed parish church of St Edmund is particularly noted for containing four Baroque marble monuments erected between the 1750s and 1830s to members of the local Montagu family of Boughton House. The monuments are housed in four niches in the specially constructed chancel. The original medieval (probably Norman) chancel was demolished to make way for its construction. The east window is large and of clear glass, flooding the chancel with light to show the white marble monuments at their best. Monuments to John Montagu, 2nd Duke of Montagu (1690–1749), and his wife, Mary Churchill (1689–1752) are by the renowned sculptor Louis-François Roubiliac. A third monument to Mary Montagu (1711–1775), daughter of John and Mary, is by Pieter Mathias van Gelder (1742–1824). These first three monuments are of very high quality, rivalling the Roubilliacs in Westminster Abbey. The fourth monument, to Elizabeth Scott, Duchess of Buccleuch (1743–1827), daughter of Mary, is by Thomas Campbell (1790–1858) and, though very fine, is of significantly lesser quality than the other three. The private family burial vault, adjacent to the chancel, contains the mortal remains of those celebrated in the monuments, together with their children, many who died in infancy, and Ralph Montagu, 1st Duke of Montagu (1638–c. 1709).

Local villages include Barton Seagrave, Weekley, Geddington and Grafton Underwood.
