= John Alfred Gotch =

English architect and architectural historian

- Born: 28 September 1852; Kettering, Northamptonshire
- Died: 17 January 1942 (aged 89); Kettering, Northamptonshire
- Education: University of Zurich; King's College London
- Occupation: Architect
- Buildings: Kettering Grammar School, Rothwell Market House

John Alfred Gotch (28 September 1852, Kettering, Northamptonshire – 17 January 1942, Kettering, Northamptonshire) was a noted English architect and architectural historian. His brother was the Pre-Raphaelite painter and illustrator Thomas Cooper Gotch, who painted his portrait. Married to Annie Gotch, one of their sons, Roby Myddleton Gotch was killed in action during the First World War aged 26.

John Gotch attended Kettering Grammar School and later studied at the University of Zürich and at King's College London.

In 1879 Gotch set up a private architectural practice in Kettering which developed into Gotch & Saunders by entering into partnership with Charles Saunders in 1887. They were later joined by Henry Ralph Surridge and they jointly retired in 1938. The practice still exists as Gotch, Saunders & Surridge LLP, or GSSArchitecture.

In Kettering, Gotch was responsible for the design and construction of shoe factories, warehouses, houses, shops, offices, banks, hospitals, schools, public houses, sports venues, entertainment venues and a temperance hall. The Practice was also responsible for the design of several First World War memorials, and the alteration and expansion of numerous historic country houses, for example, Madingley Hall, now the Institute of Continuing Education, part of the University of Cambridge. Following the end of the War, Gotch's practice designed and built over 140 branches of Midland Bank and, in association with Edwin Lutyens, Gotch designed the interior of the Bank's former headquarters in Poultry, London which is considered an Art Deco icon. The building is now owned by Soho House and was opened as The Ned in 2017.

As well as designing many buildings Gotch had an interest in Elizabethan and Jacobean architecture. He was the author of nine books in this field (two of which were reissued), as well as editor of a book on the history of the Royal Institute of British Architects (RIBA). In her dissertation for the Courtauld Institute of Art in the 1930s the art historian Margaret Whinney questioned an earlier assertion made by Gotch in 1912 regarding the reassignment of drawings from Inigo Jones, who Gotch wrote on extensively, to John Webb. ’While Whinney agreed that the drawing was not Jones', she proved, using new evidence, that the Webb sketches had come from original designs by Jones’.

Apart from his renown as an architectural historian, he also achieved eminence as a public figure and representative of the architectural profession.

He was president of the Architectural Association in 1886-1887, vice-president of the Royal Institute of British Architects (RIBA) in 1914-1919, and president of RIBA in 1923-1925: the first provincial architect to be appointed president since the formation of the institute in 1834. In addition, he was vice-president of the Society of Antiquaries, a founder member of the Royal Fine Art Commission, a Trustee of the Soane Museum, and president of the Northamptonshire Association of Architects in 1911-1922. In 1924 he received an honorary M.A. degree from the University of Oxford. John Alfred Gotch was appointed the first Charter Mayor of Kettering in 1938. In 2018 a blue plaque in honour of the architect, often cited as 'the man who built Kettering', was unveiled on the former Midland Bank building that he designed in Kettering High Street.

RIBA has an archive of Gotch’s sketchbooks, topographical drawings and manuscripts whilst further correspondence is held by Northamptonshire Record Office. Historic England hold a series of negatives taken by Gotch and photographs, donated by him, are also held in the Conway Library whose archive of architectural images is in the process of being digitised as part of the wider Courtauld Connects project.

== Notable works ==
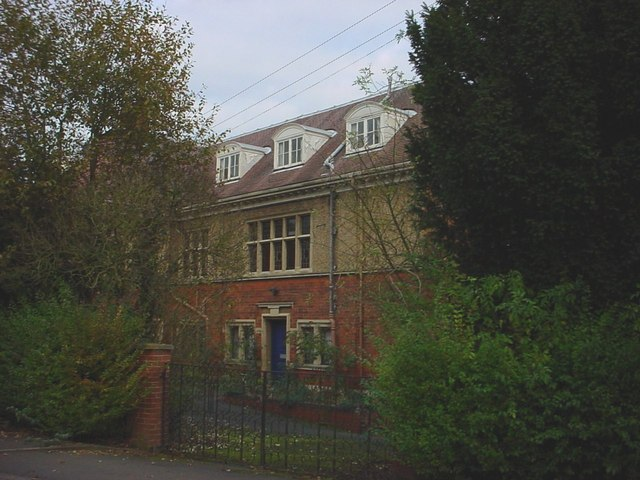
Bryn Hafod - Charles Wicksteed's house in Kettering

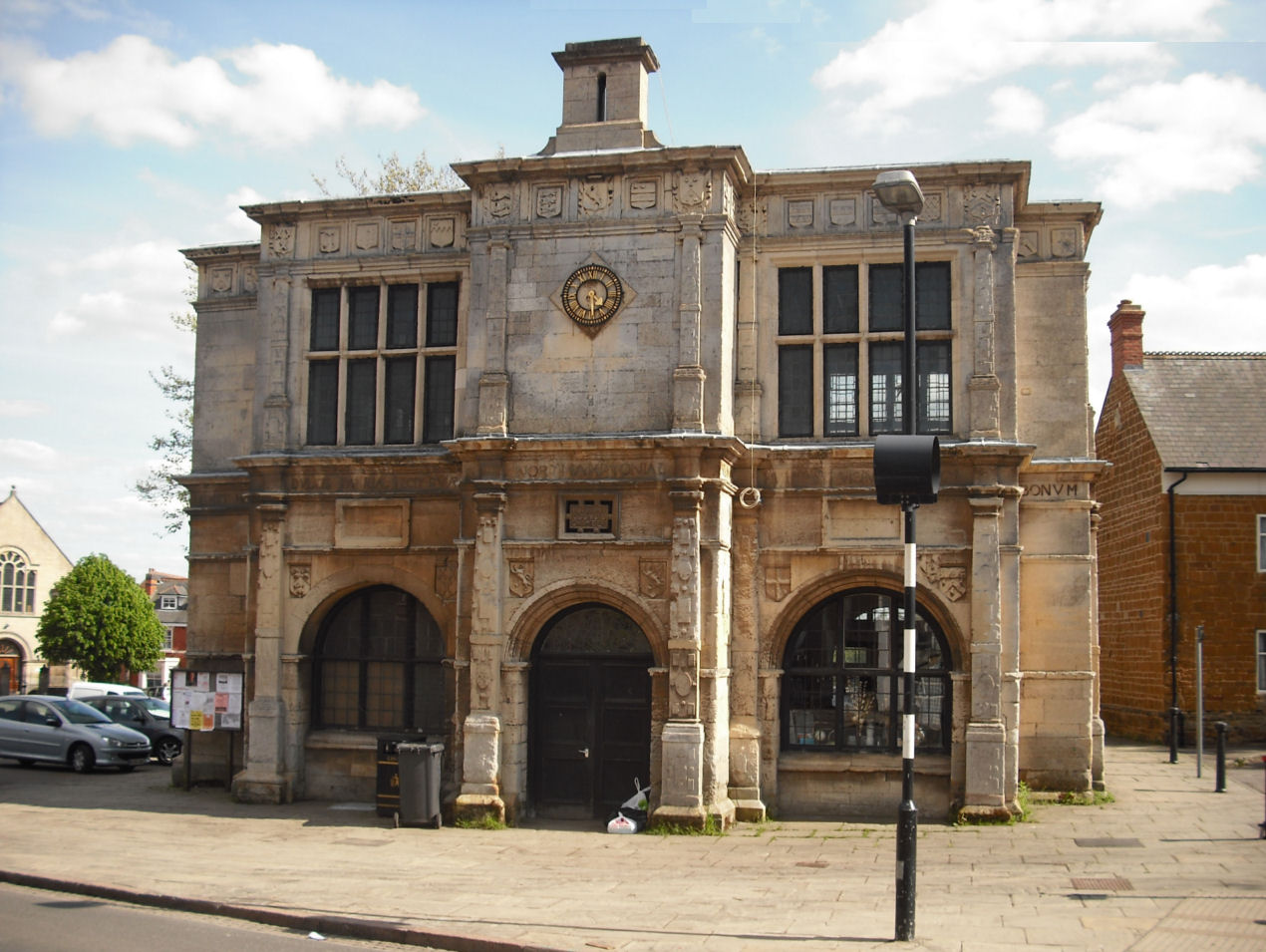
Rothwell Market House

- Alfred East Art Gallery, Kettering, 1913
- Bryn Hafod house in Kettering. built in 1896 for Charles Wicksteed. Moulded plaster ceilings were designed by Leonard Shuffrey.
- Kettering Municipal Offices (originally the home of Kettering Grammar School), 1913
- Rothwell Market House – Commissioned by Sir Thomas Tresham. Work started in 1577 but remained unfinished for nearly 300 years until completed by Gotch.

== Selected publications ==
- The Old Halls & Manor-Houses of Northamptonshire. An Illustrated Review [With plates], London: B. T. Batsford, 1936
- The Growth and Work of the Royal Institute of British Architects, 1834-1934, editor & contributor, London: Royal Institute of British Architects, 1934
- Inigo Jones, London: Methuen, 1928
- The Growth of the English House : A Short History of its Architectural Development from 1100 to 1800 [Illustrated], Second edition, London: B. T. Batsford, 1928
- Old English Houses, London: Methuen, 1925 (second edition, 1926)
- Early Renaissance Architecture in England, Second edition, London: B. T. Batsford, 1914
- The Original Drawings for the Palace at Whitehall attributed to Inigo Jones, [With illustrations], London: B. T. Batsford, 1912
