= Joseph Hartley Wicksteed =

British mechanical engineer

- Born: 12 September 1842; Leeds, England
- Died: 1919 (aged 76–77)
- Education: Ruthyn Grammar School
- Occupation: Mechanical Engineer
- Scientific career
- Fields: Mechanical Engineering
- Workplaces: Institution of Mechanical Engineers

Joseph Hartley Wicksteed (12 September 1842 – 1919) was an English mechanical engineer and businessman.

== Early life and education ==
He was born on 12th September 1842 in Leeds, England, and was educated at Ruthyn Grammar School.

== Career ==
He was an apprentice mechanist at the Joshua Buckton and Co. Well House Foundry in Leeds, where he eventually became chief designer and a partner in the business. After Joshua Buckton's retirement, Wicksteed became the head of the company. From 1903–1904, Wicksteed was President of the Institution of Mechanical Engineers. He is credited with the invention of several devices, including lever testing machines, specialty drills, and other industrial appliances.

== Bibliography ==
He is the author of a number of books:

- William Blake's Jerusalem
- Blake's Innocence and Experience
- Blake's Vision of the Book of Job

== See also ==
- Charles Wicksteed (engineer)
- Institution of Mechanical Engineers
