= Philip Wicksteed =

English economist (1844–1927)

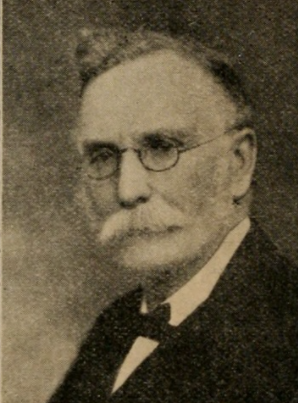
- Born: 25 October 1844; Leeds, England
- Died: 18 March 1927 (aged 82); Berkshire, England
- Parent(s): Charles Wicksteed (father); Jane Wicksteed (mother)

Academic background
- Education: University College London; Manchester New College
- Influences: Henry George; William Stanley Jevons

Academic work
- Discipline: Economics

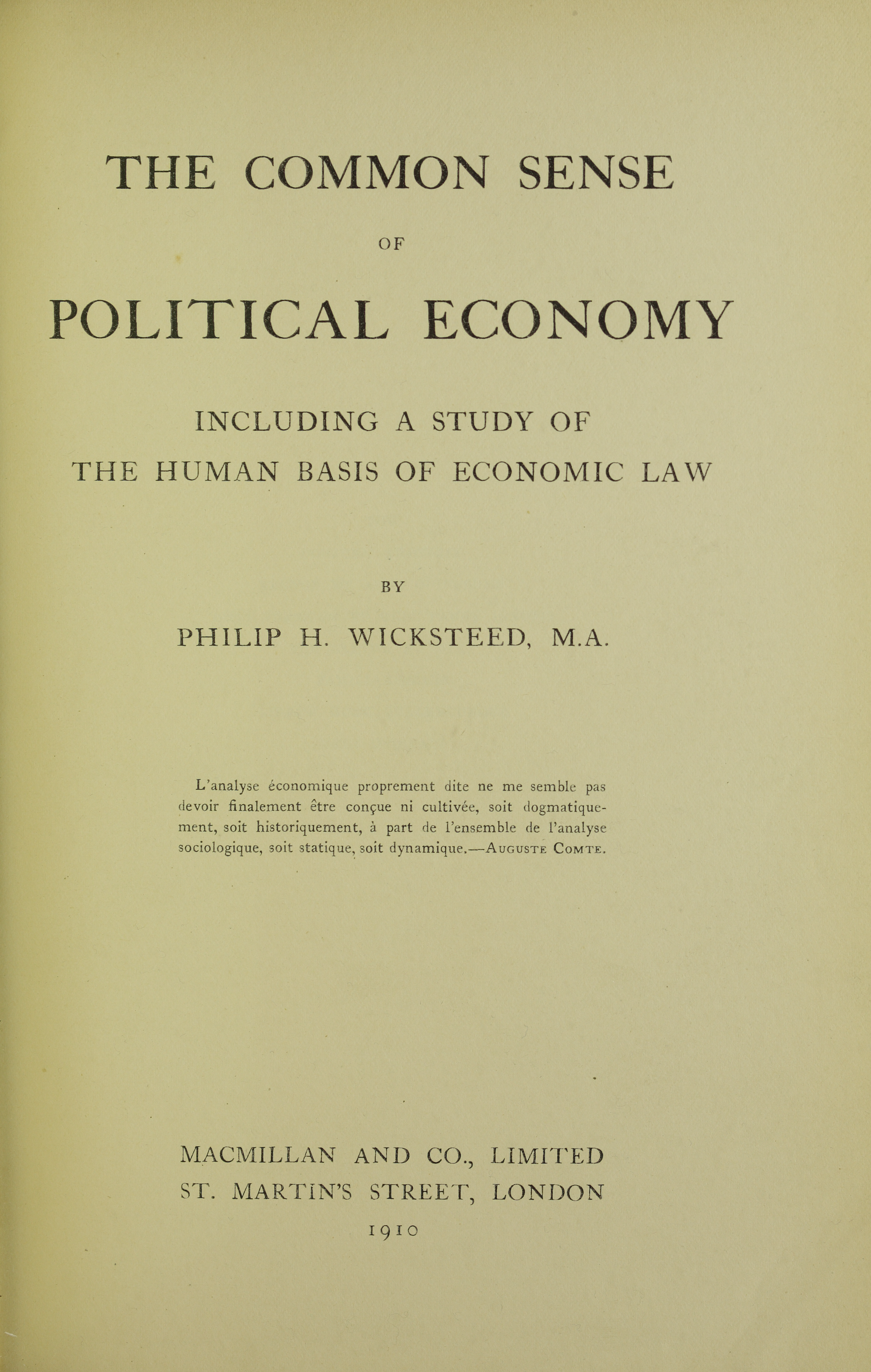
Common sense of political economy including a study of the human basis of economic law, 1910

Philip Henry Wicksteed (25 October 1844 – 18 March 1927) was an English scholar and Unitarian theologian known for his contributions to classics, medieval studies and economics. He was also a Georgist and literary critic.

== Family background ==
Philip Henry Wicksteed was the son of Charles Wicksteed (1810–1885) and his wife Jane (1814–1902), and was named after his distant ancestor, Philip Henry (1631–1696), the Nonconformist clergyman and diarist.

His father was a clergyman within the same tradition of English Dissent. His mother was born into the Lupton family, a socially progressive, politically active dynasty of businessmen and traders, long established in Leeds, a city both prosperous and squalid with the rapid growth of the Industrial Revolution. In 1835 Wicksteed had taken up the ministry of the Unitarian place of worship, Mill Hill Chapel, right on the city's central square, and two years later the couple married. In 1841 his sister Elizabeth married Jane's brother Arthur (1819–1867), also a Unitarian minister; Uncle Arthur was, according to a family history, "The Achilles of the Leeds Complete Suffrage Association", in other words, a tragic champion of the fight for universal suffrage; see Chartism and Henry Vincent for more on the CSA. One of their children, a first cousin to Philip, was the maverick MP and mining engineer Arnold Lupton. Jane was described as impractical but accomplished (sketching, painting, reciting poetry etc.) and both the Wicksteed siblings as "Unitarians of vigorous mind and keen intelligence".

Philip was one of nine children, including Janet, who wrote, as Mrs Lewis, a memoir including her parents; (Joseph) Hartley, president of the Institute of Mechanical Engineers; and Charles, also an engineer. One of his nieces was Mary Cicely Wicksteed, who married the prominent Australian surgeon Sir Hibbert Alan Stephen Newton (1887–1949)

== Education ==
Wicksteed was educated at University College London and Manchester New College, the seminary for nonconformist ministers. In 1867 he received his master's degree with a gold medal in classics. Following his father into the Unitarian ministry that year, Wicksteed embarked on an extraordinarily broad range of scholarly and theological explorations.

His theological and ethical writings continued long after he left the pulpit (in 1897), and appear to have been a starting point for many of his other fields of scholarly inquiry. These included his interest in Dante, which not only produced a remarkable list of publications, but also built Wicksteed's reputation as one of the foremost medievalists of his time. Inspired by his reading of Henry George's 1879 book Progress and Poverty, Wicksteed's theologically driven interest in the ethics of modern society, appear to have led him into his economic studies.

Perhaps it was just by circumstance that economics entered Wicksteed's field of scholarly vision, as only one of a number of areas of his interest (to most of which he was committed for years before he began his economics) and in the middle of the fourth decade of his life. This led Joseph Schumpeter to remark that Wicksteed "stood somewhat outside of the economics profession".

Yet, within a few years Wicksteed was to publish significant economic work of his own, carefully expounding on the theory he learned from William Stanley Jevons, and to become for many years a lecturer on economics for the University of London extension lectures (a kind of adult education program initiated in the 1870s to extend "the teaching of the universities, to serve up some of the crumbs from the university tables, in a portable and nutritious form, for some of the multitude who had no chance of sitting there").

In 1894, Wicksteed published his celebrated An Essay on the Co-ordination of the Laws of Distribution, in which he sought to prove mathematically that a distributive system which rewarded factory owners according to marginal productivity would exhaust the total product produced. But it was his 1910 The Common Sense of Political Economy which most comprehensively presents Wicksteed's economic system. The 1932 work by Lionel Robbins, An Essay on the Nature and Significance of Economic Science, picked up and developed his ideas.

== Personal life ==
Wicksteed married Emily, a daughter of Henry Solly, a Unitarian minister and social reformer. The library of University College London contains correspondence between Emily and Maria Sharpe Pearson, the wife of Karl Pearson.

Wicksteed was a staunch opponent of vivisection. He became an associate of Frances Power Cobbe and supported the anti-vivisection movement.

== Selected publications ==
- Memorials of the Rev. Charles Wicksteed (1886)
- The Alphabet of Economic Science; Part 1: Elements of the Theory of Value or Worth. London: Macmillan. 1888 – via Internet Archive.
- Mr. Wicksteed on Vivisection (1889)
- Vivisection: An Address
- Boccaccio, Giovanni (1904). Life of Dante. Translated by Wicksteed, Philip Henry. The Riverside Press – via Internet Archive.
- Dante: Six Sermons (6th ed.). 1905 – via Internet Archive.
- The Common Sense of Political Economy: including a study of the human basis of economic law. London: Macmillan and Co., Limited. 1910 – via Internet Archive.
- Dante and Aquinas. 1913 – via Internet Archive.
- The Reactions Between Dogma & Philosophy: illustrated from the works of Thomas Aquinas. 1920 – via Internet Archive.

== Sources ==
- Ian Steedman (1987). "Wicksteed, Philip Henry," The New Palgrave: A Dictionary of Economics, pp. 919–15.
- Wicksteed, Philip H. (1910). The Common Sense of Political Economy: Including a Study of the Human Basis of Economic Law. London: Macmillan.
- Wicksteed, Philip H. (1933). Robbins, Lionel (ed.). The Common Sense of Political Economy: Including a Study of the Human Basis of Economic Law and Selected Papers and Reviews on Economic Theory. Vol. 1. London: Routledge and Kegan Paul – via Internet Archive. Volume 2
- Wicksteed, Philip H. (1888). The Alphabet of Economic Science; Part 1: Elements of the Theory of Value or Worth. London: Macmillan – via Internet Archive.
- Wicksteed, Philip H. (1914). "The Scope and Method of Political Economy in the Light of the 'Marginal' Theory of Value and Distribution". Economic Journal. 24 (94): 1–23. JSTOR 2221810. (reprinted in Wicksteed, 1933).
