= Rothwell Market House =

Municipal building in Rothwell, Northamptonshire, England

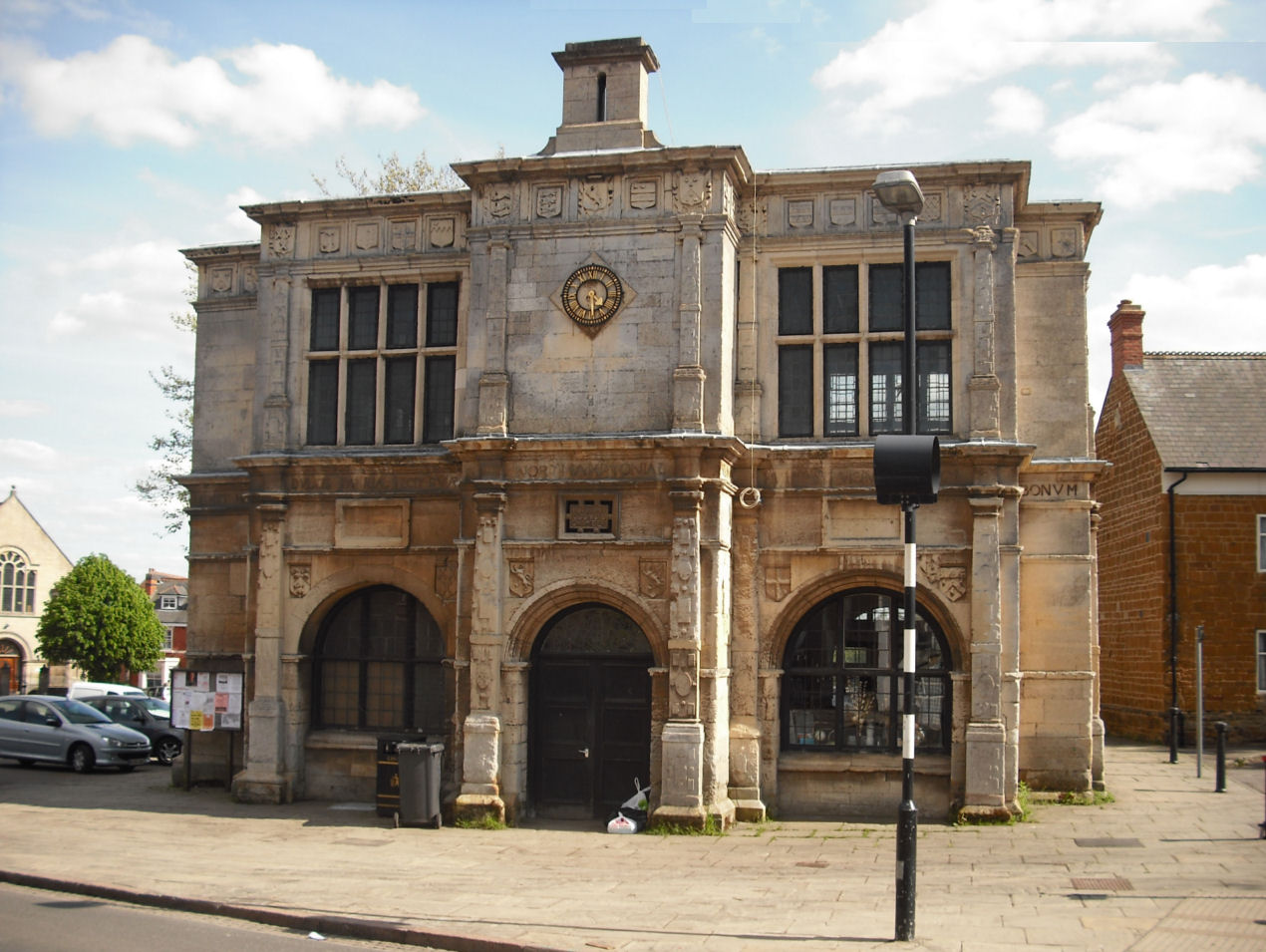
- The building in 2013

- Shown in Northamptonshire
- 52.4228°N 0.8005°W
- Location: Market Hill, Rothwell

History
- Built: 1578

Site notes
- Architect: John Thorpe
- Architectural style: Neoclassical style

Listed Building – Grade I
- Official name: Rothwell Market House
- Designated: 12 June 1950
- Reference no.: 1288812

The Market House is a historic building on Market Hill in Rothwell, a town in Northamptonshire, England. The building is a Grade I listed building. It is managed by the Rothwell Preservation Trust based in Rothwell, Northamptonshire.

== History ==
The building was commissioned by the lord of the manor, Thomas Tresham, whose seat was at Rushton Hall and who had a passion for strange and unusual buildings. As a recusant Catholic at a time of religious persecution, he spent long periods in prison for his beliefs. Unable to openly practise his faith, he encoded symbols of it into his buildings. The site he selected for the market house was a prominent location on the south side of Market Hill, where the annual Rothwell (or Rowell) Fair took place. The building was designed by John Thorpe in the neoclassical style, built by a local stonemason, William Grumbold, in ashlar stone and was largely completed in 1578. The stone was donated by the Lord Lieutenant of Northamptonshire, Sir Christopher Hatton.

The building was laid out in the shape of a cross, a gesture to his religious beliefs, intended to recall the crucifixion of Jesus. The design involved a symmetrical main frontage of three bays facing onto Market Hill. The central bay, which was slightly projected forward, featured a round headed opening with imposts and an archivolt flanked by Doric order pilasters supporting an entablature; the bay was blind and flanked by Ionic order pilasters on the first floor. The bays on either side of the central bay originally featured round headed openings; these bays were fenestrated by mullioned and transomed windows on the first floor. A band at first floor level recorded in Latin that: "This is the work of Sir Thomas Tresham, Knight. He did it for the sake of his beloved native land and county of Northampton but most of all on account of this his neighbouring town". At roof level, there was an entablature, which was decorated with heraldic devices. There was a round tower in the southeast corner which was at the rear of the building. Although Tresham gave the market house to the town, it was left without a roof at that time, probably because he did not have the funds to complete it.

In the late 16th century, Tresham commissioned the Rushton Triangular Lodge, which was laid out in the shape of a triangle, again a gesture to his religious beliefs, intended to recall the trinity. The market house was in a dilapidated state by the early 18th century and was restored in 1827. During the 19th century, the building was primarily used as a lock-up for petty criminals. Following significant population growth, largely as a result of its status as a market town, a local board was appointed in Rothwell in 1891. After the local board was succeeded by Rothwell Urban District Council in 1894, the new council instructed a local contractor, Margetts & Neal, to complete the building, to a design by local architect John Alfred Gotch. The building was finally roofed in 1895. As part of the refurbishment a clock was added (a timepiece by J. B. Joyce & Co) with two dials, one external and one internal.

The council then used the building to accommodate its council chamber and the local public library. The building ceased to be the local seat of government when the council moved to the Manor House in 1936. The market house continued to accommodate the local public library until the library service moved to a new building on the north side of Market Hill in 1986. Rothwell Preservation Trust, which was formed in 1985, took over the management of the building, which became the meeting place of Rothwell Town Council. Prince Richard, Duke of Gloucester visited the market house and reviewed the work of the trust in 1989.

== See also ==
- Grade I listed buildings in Northamptonshire
