= Southfield School, Kettering =

Southfield School

Location
- Lewis Road; Kettering, Northamptonshire, NN15 6HE; England; 52.3866°N 0.7181°W

Information
- Type: Academy
- Motto: A world of possibilities
- Established: 1976
- Department for Education URN: 136976 Tables
- Ofsted: Reports
- Headteacher: Chris Meadway
- Gender: Girls (Coeducational sixth form)
- Age: 11 to 18
- Houses: Bronte; Curie; Nightingale; Parks
- Website: http://www.southfieldsch.co.uk/

Southfield School is a girls' secondary school and coeducational sixth form with academy status, located in Kettering in the English county of Northamptonshire.

== History ==
Southfield School opened in 1976 after the amalgamation of Kettering High School for Girls and Rockingham Road Senior Girls School.

Previously a foundation school administered by Northamptonshire County Council, the school converted to academy status in August 2011, and in 2021 it joined with Kingsthorpe College in Northampton as part of the Orbis Education Trust, a Multi-Academy Trust. The school continues to coordinate with Northamptonshire County Council for admissions.

Southfield School offers GCSEs as programmes of study for girls. The school operates a coeducational sixth form, where students can choose to study from range of A Levels and BTECs.

After a period of sustained improvement, in 2021 Southfield was awarded the World Class Schools Quality Mark.

== Notable former pupils ==
- Faryl Smith, mezzo-soprano
