= Corn Exchange, Kettering =

Commercial building in Kettering, Northamptonshire, England

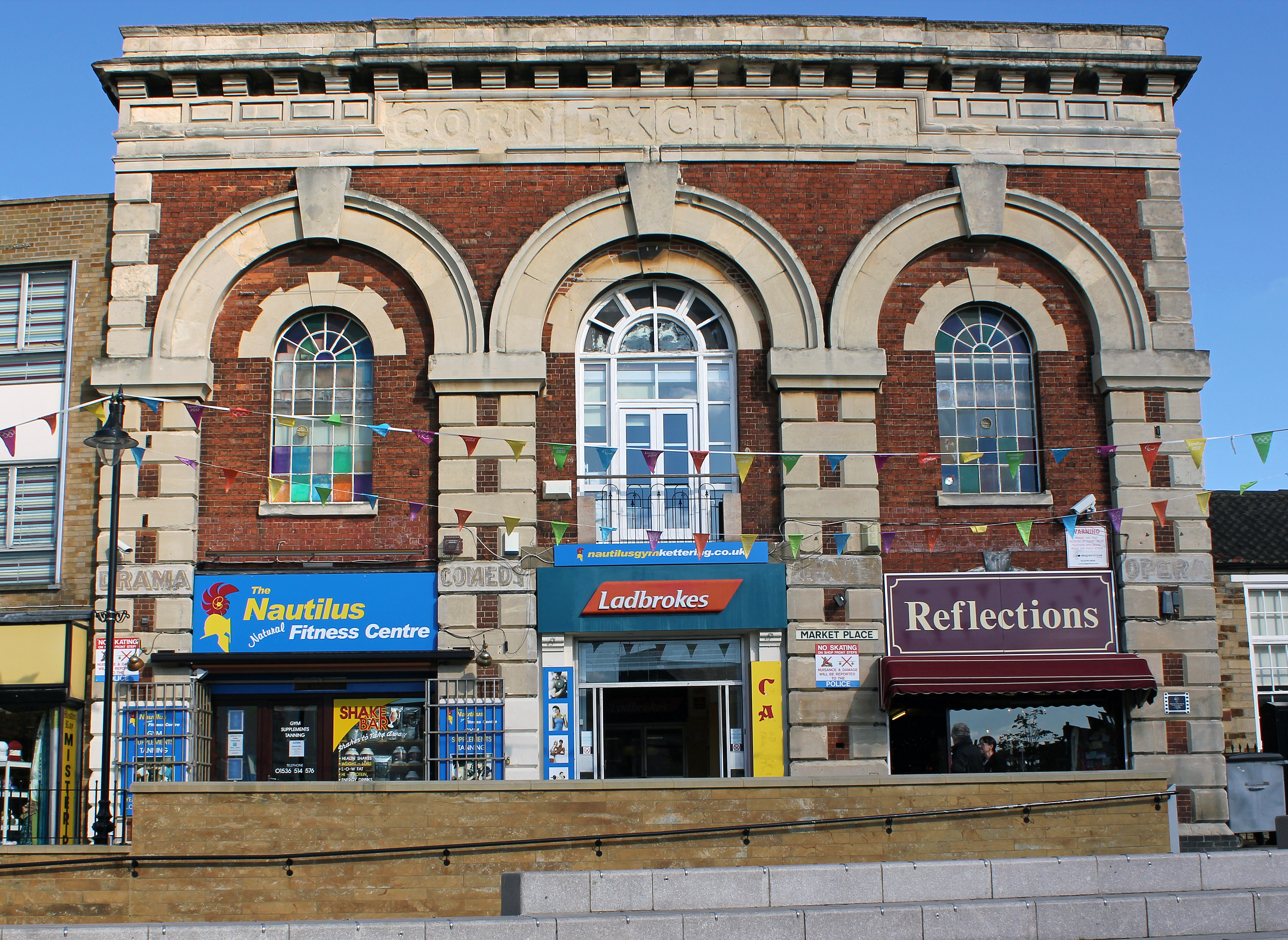
- Corn Exchange, Kettering

- Shown in Northamptonshire
- 52.3975°N 0.7273°W
- Location: Market Place, Kettering

History
- Built: 1853

Site notes
- Architect: Edmund Francis Law
- Architectural style: Italianate style

The Corn Exchange is a commercial building in the Market Place, Kettering, Northamptonshire, England. The structure, which was used as a cinema for much of the 20th century, currently accommodates a restaurant.

== History ==
In the mid-19th century, a group of local businessmen decided to form a company, known as the "Town Hall and Corn Exchange Company" to finance and commission a purpose-built corn exchange for the town. The site they chose was on the east side of the Market Place.

The building was designed by Edmund Francis Law in the Italianate style, built in red brick with stone facings at a cost of £2,950 and was completed in 1853. The design involved a symmetrical main frontage of three bays facing onto the Market Place. The central bay featured a square headed doorway flanked by brackets supporting a balcony with wrought iron railings. The outer bays on the ground floor and all three bays on the first floor were fenestrated by round headed sash windows with stone voussoirs and keystones. The bays were flanked by rusticated stone pilasters supporting stone hood moulds placed above the first-floor windows. At the corners, there were quoins and, at roof level, there was an entablature inscribed with the words "Corn Exchange", a modillioned cornice and a parapet. Internally, the principal rooms were the market hall on the ground floor, which was 58 feet (18 m) long and 32 feet (9.8 m) wide, and an assembly hall on the first floor which was used as a town hall, as a venue for county court hearings and as a drill hall for the 9th Battalion of the Northamptonshire Rifle Volunteers.

The use of the building as a corn exchange declined significantly in the wake of the Great Depression of British Agriculture in the late 19th century.

Following significant population growth, largely associated with the status of Kettering as a market town, the area became a local government district in 1872, governed by a local board. At its second meeting in September 1872 the board decided to rent rooms at the corn exchange for future meetings, and later also established an office for its surveyor in the building. Such local government districts were reconstituted as urban districts in 1894. In 1904 the council moved its meeting place to the Stamford Road School (now the William Knibb Centre). The council's offices also outgrew the limited space at the corn exchange and were subsequently distributed to various buildings across the town.

The corn exchange, which had already been used as a venue for showings of silent films from February 1903, was brought under the management of Leon Vint as "Vint's Electric Palace" in October 1909. It was then rebranded as the "Palace Theatre" in June 1912 and as the "Hippodrome Cinema" in November 1917. The company that had developed the building got into financial difficulties in the 1920s and was wound up in November 1926. The building was subsequently converted for use as an auction house. By the early 21st century, it was home to a fitness centre, a betting office and a gift shop, but in 2014, it was converted for use as a restaurant, named the "Kino Lounge" to recall the former use of the building as a cinema.

The comedian, Mark Watson, put on an impromptu performance in front of the building in September 2022.

== See also ==
- Corn exchanges in England
