= Weekley =

Village in Northamptonshire, England

Coordinates: 52.4176°N 0.6993°W

- Location within Northamptonshire
- Population: 297 (2011)
- OS grid reference: SP8880
- Unitary authority: North Northamptonshire
- Ceremonial county: Northamptonshire
- Region: East Midlands
- Country: England
- Sovereign state: United Kingdom
- Post town: Kettering
- Postcode district: NN16
- Dialling code: 01536
- Police: Northamptonshire
- Fire: Northamptonshire
- Ambulance: East Midlands
- UK Parliament: Kettering

Weekley is a small village and civil parish in the English county of Northamptonshire, on the outskirts of Kettering.

The village's name probably means, 'wood/clearing by the Romano-British vicus', a trading settlement. There are two known Romano-British destinations in the surrounding area. On the other hand, 'wych-elm wood/clearing' might be an alternative derivation.

At the time of the 2001 census, the parish's population was 242 people, increasing to 297 at the 2011 Census.

Many houses in Weekley have thatched roofs. The busy A4300 road runs through the village.

== Governance ==
Weekley is part of the North Northamptonshire unitary authority.
