= St Peter and St Paul's Church, Kettering =

St Peter and St Paul’s Church, Kettering
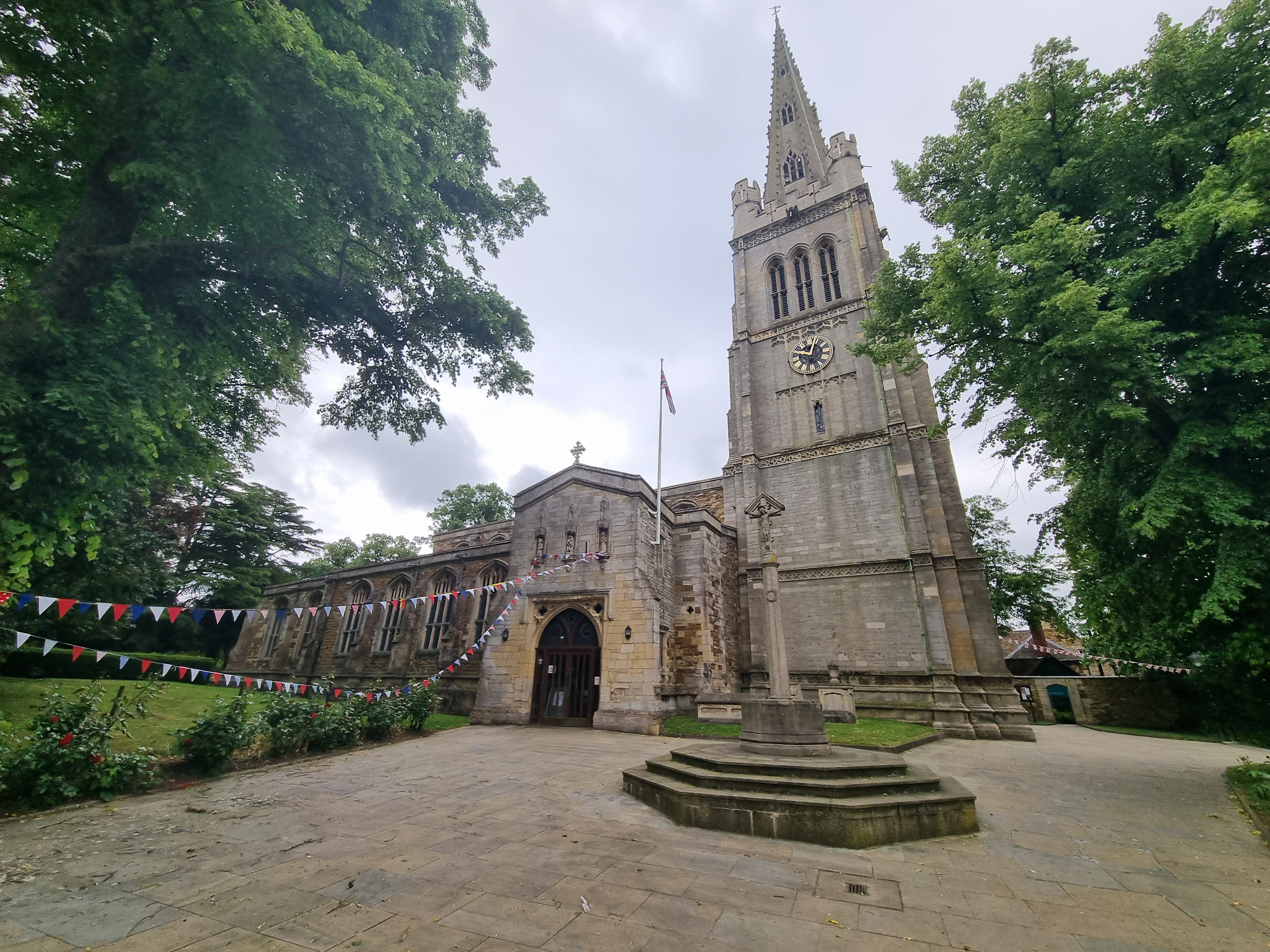
- St Peter and St Paul’s Church in 2022

- Location within Northamptonshire
- 52°23′48.64″N 0°43′35.88″W
- Location: Kettering, Northamptonshire
- Country: England
- Denomination: Church of England

History
- Dedication: Peter and Paul

Architecture
- Heritage designation: Grade I listed

Administration
- Diocese: Peterborough
- Archdeaconry: Oakham
- Deanery: Kettering
- Parish: Kettering

St Peter and St Paul's Church is a Church of England parish church in Kettering, Northamptonshire. It is a Grade I listed building.

== History ==
Little is known of the origins of the church, its first known priest becoming rector in 1219–20. The chancel is in the Early Decorated style of about 1300, the main fabric of the building being mostly Perpendicular, having been rebuilt in the mid 15th century. The crocketed spire reaches a height of 179 feet (55 metres).

Whether the current building replaced an earlier church on the site is unknown. Two medieval wall paintings, one of two angels with feathered wings, and one of a now faded saint, can still be seen inside the church.

== Parish status ==
The church is in a joint parish with St Michael and All Angels’ Church, Kettering.

== Organ ==
The organ was rebuilt by Kenneth Canter of Bury St Edmunds in a case of 1892/3 by Arthur Blomfield. A specification of the organ can be found on the National Pipe Organ Register.

== Bells ==
The peal of 12 bells dates from 2004 and was cast by the Whitechapel Bell Foundry in London.

== Carvings ==
The statues of St Peter and St Paul above the North Door were carved by local author and publisher J. L. Carr to replace carvings destroyed in the Reformation. A service of dedication was held for the carvings on Sunday 7 October 1984.

== Anecdotal Stories ==
During the war, fighter pilots would look out for the towering spire - higher than anything around, to navigate to the local airbase at Grafton Underwood. With nothing else even close to the height, it was seen as the ideal marker for pilots to aim for.

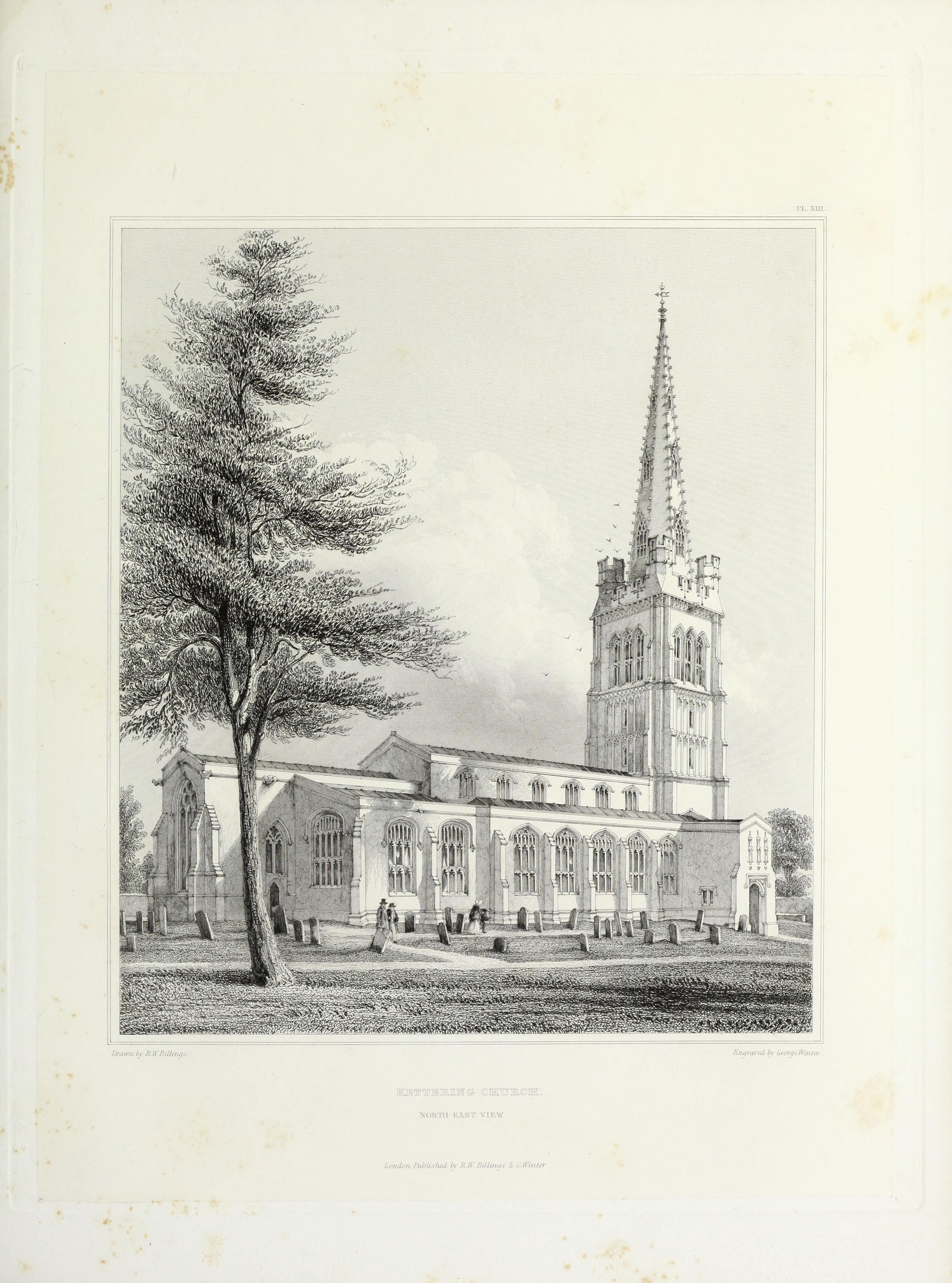
The church as illustrated in 1843
