= Alan Newton (surgeon) =

Australian surgeon

Sir Hibbert Alan Stephen Newton MB MS FRCS (30 April 1887 – 4 August 1949), generally known as (Sir) Alan Newton was a noted Australian surgeon.

== History ==
Newton was born in Malvern, Victoria, a son of Hibbert Henry Newton (1861–1927) and Clara Violet Newton, née Stephen (1863–1935), and grandson of Hibbert Newton, MP.

He was educated at Haileybury College in Brighton, Victoria, and studied medicine at the University of Melbourne, qualifying in 1909, taking first class honors throughout his course and taking top honours in his final year. He was resident medical officer at the Melbourne Hospital in 1910 and honorary surgeon to the outpatients department from 1913 to 1917. He served in the RAAMC with the First AIF during the Great War, then continued his studies in London, and was admitted as a Master of Surgery and a Fellow of the Royal College of Surgeons. He was a clinical lecturer in surgery from 1927 and honorary consulting surgeon at the Victorian Eye and Ear Hospital.

During the Second World War he served as chairman of the Medical Equipment Control Committee, in charge of allocating medical equipment and material for both military and civilian use. He was instrumental in the first importation of penicillin by air and the development of its manufacture in Victoria.

He was a noted teacher of surgery and largely responsible for the formation of the Royal Australasian College of Surgeons and served as its president. He has been credited with raising the standard of medical teaching in Melbourne.

== Recognition ==
Newton was invested as Knight Bachelor by Edward VIII in November 1936.

A portrait by W. B. McInnes (an Archibald Prize entry in 1936) hangs in the Royal Australian College of Surgeons.

== Family ==
Newton married Mary Cicely Wicksteed, a niece of Philip Wicksteed in England on 5 June 1919. They had a son and a daughter.
