= Kettering =

Market town and civil parish in Northamptonshire, England

Coordinates: 52.39312°N 0.72292°W

- Town
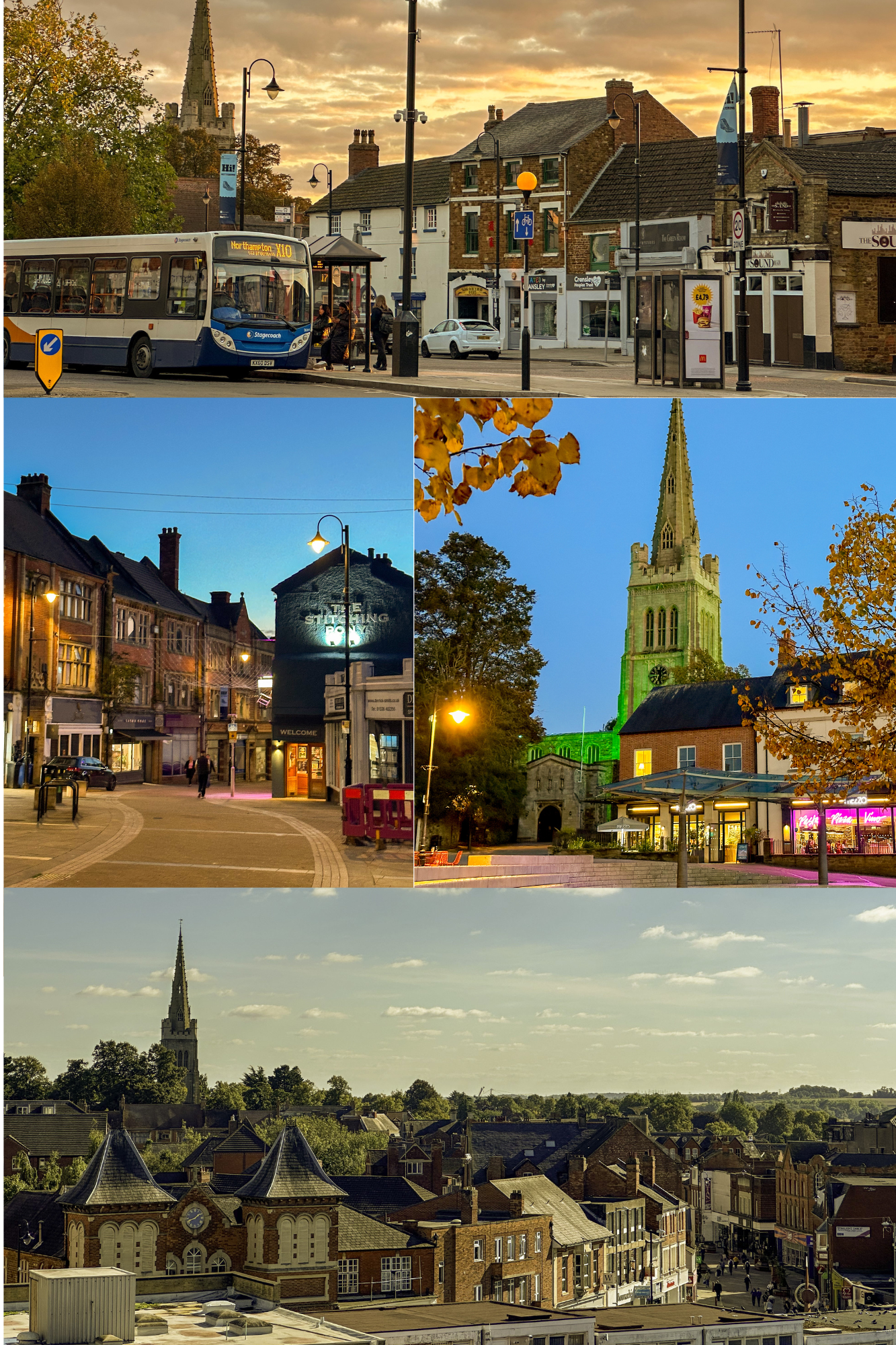
- Clockwise from top: Horsemarket, Market Hill, Town Centre and Market Street

- Location within Northamptonshire
- Population: 56,676 (Parish, 2021); 63,150 (Built up area, 2021)
- OS grid reference: SP8778
  - London: 67 miles (108 km)
- Civil parish: Kettering Town
- Unitary authority: North Northamptonshire
- Ceremonial county: Northamptonshire
- Region: East Midlands
- Country: England
- Sovereign state: United Kingdom
- Areas of the town: List: Ise Lodge; Burton Latimer (town); Isham; Town Centre; Warkton; Weekley
- Post town: KETTERING
- Postcode district: NN14, NN15, NN16
- Dialling code: 01536
- Police: Northamptonshire
- Fire: Northamptonshire
- Ambulance: East Midlands
- UK Parliament: Kettering
- Website: www.ketteringtowncouncil.gov.uk

Kettering is a market town in the North Northamptonshire district of Northamptonshire, England. It lies 45 miles (72 km) west of Cambridge, 31 miles (50 km) south-west of Peterborough, 28 miles (45 km) south-east of Leicester and 15 miles (24 km) north-east of Northampton; it is west of the River Ise, a tributary of the River Nene. The name means "the place (or territory) of Ketter's people (or kinsfolk)".

At the 2021 census, Kettering had a population of 63,150. It is part of the East Midlands, along with the rest of Northamptonshire.

== Early history ==
Kettering means "the place (or territory) of Ketter's people (or kinsfolk)". Spelt variously Cytringan, Kyteringas and Keteiringan in the 10th century, although the origin of the name appears to have baffled place-name scholars in the 1930s, words and place-names ending with "-ing" usually derive from the Anglo-Saxon or Old English suffix -inga or -ingas, meaning "the people of the" or "tribe".

Before the Romans, the area, like much of Northamptonshire's prehistoric countryside, appears to have remained somewhat intractable with regards to early human occupation, resulting in an apparently sparse population and relatively few finds from the Palaeolithic, Mesolithic and Neolithic periods. About 700 BC the use of iron spread into the area from the continent. Between then and about 300BC two alignments of hill forts appear to have been constructed, with roughly even spacing between each fort on each chain. One of the alignments was along the north western side of the county with one of them possibly at Desborough. Iron Age finds have been discovered there including the Desborough Mirror but the existence of that fort cannot be proved because the probable site has been quarried away. The other alignment was along the Nene Valley, roughly parallel to the first. One of these forts was at Irthlingborough and it was discovered in 1984. An archaeological investigation there found early Iron Age pottery and showed that a wooden structure there with a stockade was burnt down at some stage.

=== Roman ===
Like most of what later became Northamptonshire, from late in the 1st century BC the Kettering area became part of the territory of the Catuvellauni, a Belgic tribe, the Northamptonshire area forming their most northerly possession. The Catuvellauni were in turn conquered by the Romans in AD 43.

The town traces its origins to an early, unwalled Romano-British settlement, the remnants of which lie under the northern part of the modern town. Occupied until the 4th century, there is evidence that a substantial amount of iron smelting took place on the site. Along with the Forest of Dean and the Weald of Kent and Sussex, this area of Northamptonshire "was one of the three great centres of iron-working in Roman Britain". The settlement reached as far as the Weekley and Geddington parishes. However, it is felt unlikely that the site was continuously occupied from the Romano-British into the Anglo-Saxon era. Excavations have revealed that the site at Weekly had been used for agriculture during the later Iron Age and a fortified enclosure had been constructed during the first century BC. During the first century AD lime kilns and kilns for making pottery were constructed. The site appears to have been occupied until about a hundred and fifty years after the Roman conquest. That would be until about 190 to 200 AD. Pottery kilns have also been unearthed at nearby Barton Seagrave and Boughton.

=== Saxon ===
Excavations in the early 20th century either side of Stamford road (A43), near the site of the former Prime Cut factory (now the Warren public house), revealed an extensive early Saxon burial site, consisting of at least a hundred cremation urns dating to the 5th century AD. This suggests that it may have been among the earliest Anglo-Saxon penetrations into the interior of what later became England. The prefix Wic- of the nearby village of Weekley may also signify Anglo-Saxon activities in the area; Greenall reports that it could be "an indication of foederati, Anglo-Saxon mercenaries brought in to boost the defences of the Empire." This was established imperial policy, which the Romano-British continued after Rome withdrew from Britain around 410, with disastrous consequences for the Romano-Britons.

By the 7th century the lands that would eventually become Northamptonshire formed part of the Anglo-Saxon kingdom of Mercia. The Mercians converted to Christianity in 654 with the death of the pagan king Penda. From about 889 the Kettering area, along with much of Northamptonshire (and at one point almost all of England except for Athelney marsh in Somerset), was conquered by the Danes and became part of the Danelaw, with the ancient trackway of Watling Street serving as the border, until being recaptured by the English under the Wessex king Edward the Elder, son of Alfred the Great, in 917. Northamptonshire was conquered again in 940, this time by the Vikings of York, who devastated the area, only for the county to be retaken by the English in 942.

It is unlikely, however, that Kettering itself existed as a village earlier than the 10th century (the county of Northampton itself is not referenced in documents before 1011). Before this time the Kettering area was most likely populated by a thin scattering of family farmsteads. The first historical reference of Kettering is in a charter of 956 in which King Edwy granted ten "cassati" of land to Ælfsige the Goldsmith. The boundaries delineated in this charter would have been recognisable to most inhabitants for the last thousand years and can still be walked today. It is possible that Ælfsige gave Kettering to the monastery of Peterborough, as King Edgar in a charter dated 972 confirmed it to that monastery.

=== Medieval ===
At the Domesday survey in 1086, Kettering manor is listed as held by the Abbey of Peterborough, the church owning 10 hides of land. Kettering was valued at £11, with land for 16 ploughs. There were 107 acres of meadow, 3 of woodland, 2 mills, 31 villans with 10 ploughs and 1 female slave.

The nearby stately home of Boughton House, sometimes described as the 'English Versailles', has for centuries been the seat of the Dukes of Buccleuch, major landowners in Kettering and most of the surrounding villages; along with the Watsons of Rockingham Castle, the two families were joint lords of the manor of Kettering.

Kettering is dominated by the crocketed spire of about 180 feet (55 m) of the Parish church of SS Peter and Paul. Little is known of the origins of the church, its first known priest becoming rector in 1219–20. The chancel is in the Early Decorated style of about 1300, the main fabric of the building being mostly Perpendicular, having been rebuilt in the mid 15th century (its tower and spire being remarkably similar to the tower and spire of St Peter's Oundle). Whether the current building replaced an earlier church on the site is unknown. Two medieval wall paintings, one of two angels with feathered wings, and one of a now faded saint, can still be seen inside the church.

The charter for Kettering's market was granted to the Bishop of Peterborough by Henry III in 1227.

=== 17th century ===
In June 1607 at the nearby village of Newton, the Newton Rebellion broke out, causing a brief uprising known as the Midland Revolt, which involved several nearby villages. Protesting at land enclosures at Newton and Pytchley by local landlords the Treshams, on 8 June a pitched battle took place between Levellers – many from Kettering, Corby and particularly Weldon, – and local gentry and their servants (local militias having refused the call to arms). Approximately 40–50 local men are said to have been killed and the ringleaders hanged, drawn and quartered. The Newton rebellion represents one of the last times that the English peasantry and the gentry were in open conflict.

By the 17th century the town was a centre for woollen cloth.

== Recent history (from 19th century to present day) ==
The present town grew in the 19th century with the development of the boot and shoe industry, for which Northamptonshire as a whole became famous. Many large homes in both the Headlands and Rockingham Road were built for factory owners, while terraced streets provided accommodation for the workers. The industry has markedly declined since the 1970s, large footwear-manufacturers such as Dolcis, Freeman, Hardy and Willis, Frank Wright and Timpsons, having left the town or closed down in the face of stiff overseas competition, while others have outsourced their production to lower-cost countries. Only two smaller footwear-businesses remain.

William Carey, born in 1761 at Paulerspury, spent his early life in Kettering before leaving for India as a missionary in 1793. Carey Mission House and Carey Street were named after him. Andrew Fuller helped Carey found the Baptist Missionary Society and he is remembered in the Fuller Church and Fuller Street. In 1803 William Knibb was born in Market Street and became a missionary and emancipator of slaves; he is commemorated by the Knibb Centre and Knibb Street. Toller Chapel and Toller Place take their names from two ministers, father and son, who preached in Kettering for a total of 100 years. The chapel was built in 1723 for those who since 1662 had been worshipping in secret.

Politics in Kettering has not always been a sedate affair: in 1835, a horrified Charles Dickens, then a young reporter for the Morning Chronicle, watched aghast as a Tory supporter on horseback, intent (along with others) on taking control of by-election proceedings, produced a loaded pistol and had to be restrained by his friends from committing murder. The ensuing riot between Tory and Whig supporters led Dickens in his article to form various opinions of Kettering and its voters, none of them complimentary.

After several false starts the Midland Railway opened Kettering railway station in 1857, providing a welcome economic stimulus to an ailing local economy, suffering as it was from the loss of wayfaring business since the introduction of railways nationwide. The line in 1857 ran through Kettering from Leicester to Hitchin, where it joined the Great Northern Railway. Trains ran from there into London King's Cross. The line was finally linked to London directly in 1868 when the Midland opened its own line from Bedford to London St Pancras.

John Bartholomew's 1887 Gazetteer of the British Isles described Kettering as:

Kettering, market town and parish with railway station, Northamptonshire, 8 miles (13 km) N. of Wellingborough and 75 miles (121 km) from London, 2840 ac., pop. 11,095; P.O., T.O.; 3 Banks, 2 newspapers. Market-day, Friday. Kettering is an ancient place, and was called by the Saxons, "Kateringes". It is a fairly prosperous town, with tanning and currying, mfrs. of boots and shoes, stays, brushes, agricultural implements, and some articles of clothing. It has a handsome town hall, a cattle market, a corn exchange and a grammar school. Many Roman relics have been found in the vicinity.

Iron-ore quarrying began in the Kettering area, probably for the first time since Roman times, at Glendon to the north of the town in 1863. At that place the digging of a railway cutting had exposed the ore beds. Quarrying began a little north of what later became Glendon Junction on the west side of the main railway. The Glendon quarries continued in operation until 1980. The last ore was extracted a little to the east of the starting point on the west side of the A6003. Other quarries opened to the east, south and west of Kettering, all opening and closing at some time between 1875 and 1969. There were also two ironworks in or near the town which used local ore. The Cransley Ironworks stood on the north side of the A43 to the west of what is now the junction with the A14. It began smelting iron in 1877 and ceased production in 1959. The site later became a scrapyard. The Kettering Ironworks, on the west side of the main railway to the north of Rothwell Road, began smelting iron in 1878 and ceased production in 1959, though ore quarrying continued until 1961.

In 1921, Wicksteed Park, Britain's second-oldest theme park, was officially opened on the southern outskirts of the town.

From 1942 to 1945 the town witnessed a large influx of American servicemen (including on several occasions Clark Gable), mainly from the US 8th Air Force at RAF Grafton Underwood, 3.7 miles (6.0 km) away. The airfield was soon nicknamed "Grafton Undermud" in reference to the perceived English weather of "rain, rain and more rain". The first bombing raid – targeting the marshalling yards at Rouen in northern France – was led by Major Paul W. Tibbets, who in 1945 piloted Enola Gay, the B-29 Superfortress that dropped the atomic bomb on Hiroshima. Aircraft from Grafton Underwood dropped the 8th Air Force's first and last bombs of the Second World War.

In the recent years, a new 'Cornerstone' initiative has been started by North Northamptonshire Council and SEMLEP (South East Midlands Local Enterprise Partnership), aiming to revitalise parts of the town centre, these being the Library, Alfred East Art Gallery (the only purpose-built art gallery in Northamptonshire) & the Manor House Museum and Gardens.

== Governance ==
There are two tiers of local government covering Kettering, at parish (town) and unitary authority level: Kettering Town Council and North Northamptonshire Council. The town council has its offices at 10 Headlands and holds its meetings at various venues. North Northamptonshire Council has its main offices in Corby but retains the former Kettering Borough Council headquarters at the Municipal Offices on Bowling Green Road as an area office.

=== Administrative history ===
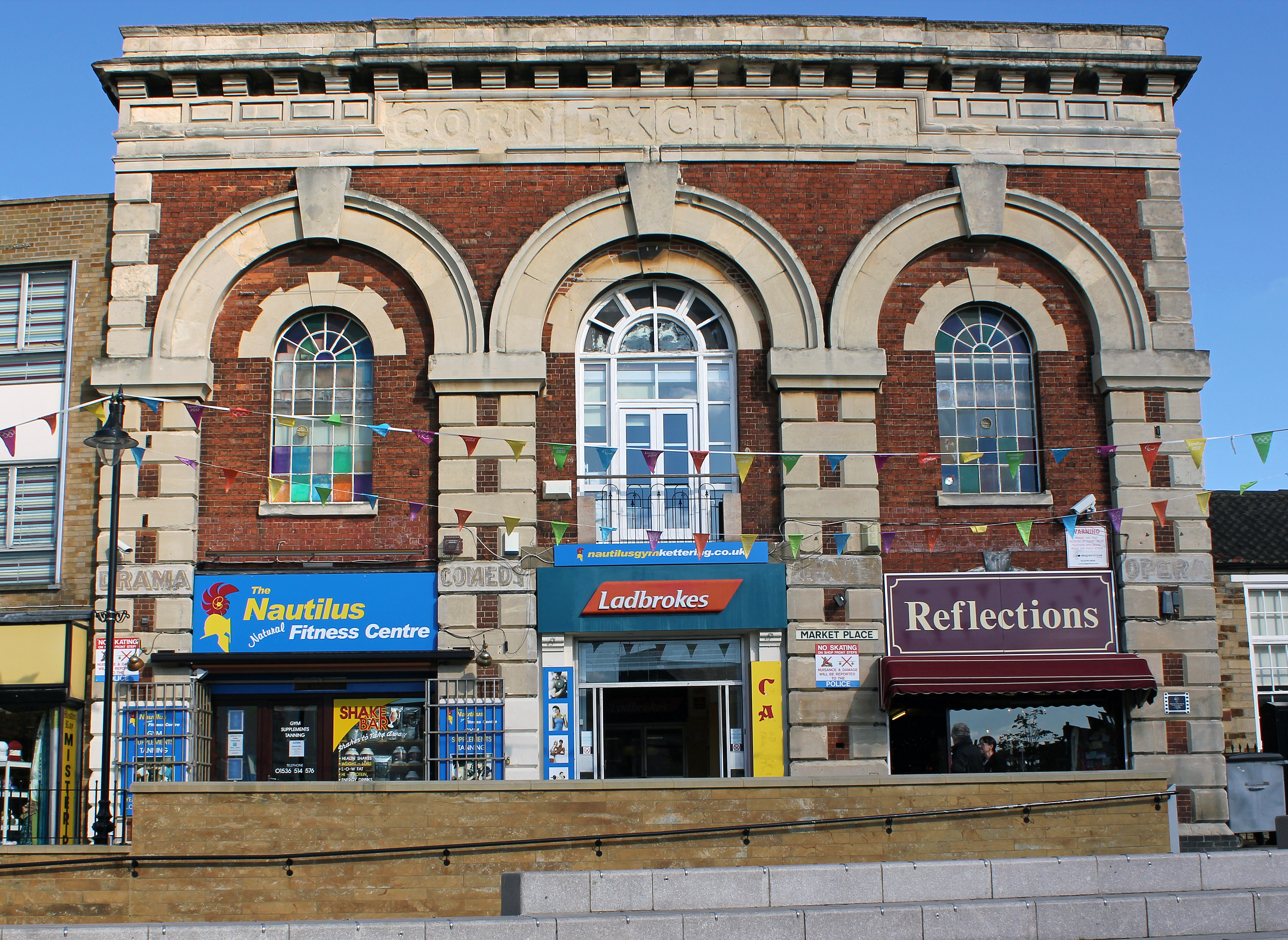
Corn Exchange, Market Square: Built 1853 and also served as a town hall until 1904.

Kettering was an ancient parish. Until 1872 the parish was governed by its vestry. In 1872 the parish was made a local government district, governed by a local board. The board subsequently held its meetings at the Town Hall, which was the main assembly room at the Corn Exchange in the Market Place, which had been built by a private company in 1853 to the designs of Edmund Francis Law.

Such local government districts were reconstituted as urban districts in 1894. In 1904 the council moved its meeting place to Stamford Road School (now the William Knibb Centre). Kettering Urban District was enlarged in 1935 to take in Barton Seagrave. The urban district was elevated to become a municipal borough in 1938, allowing the council to appoint a mayor.

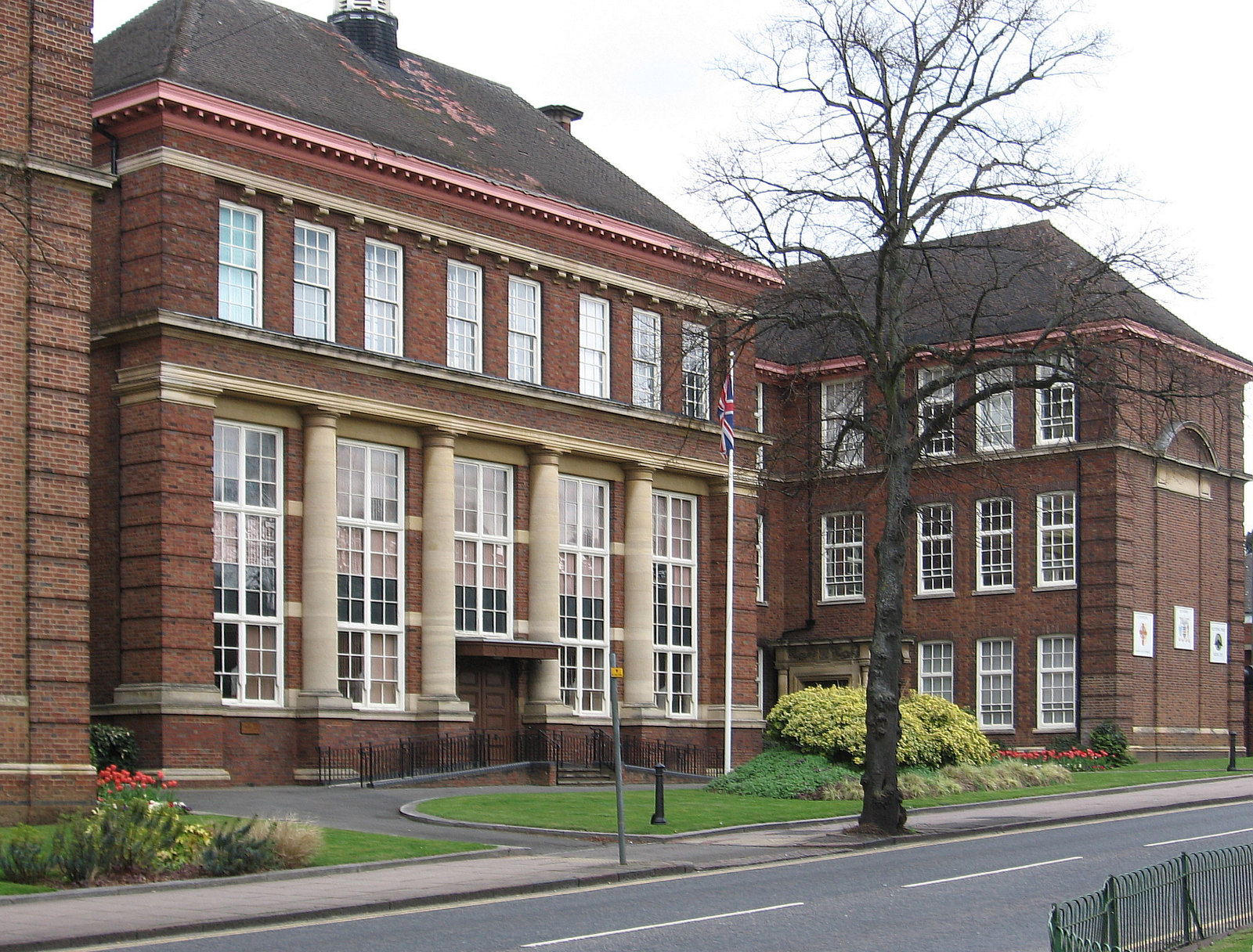
Municipal Offices in Bowling Green Road

The council relocated in 1966 to the Municipal Offices in Bowling Green Road, which had previously been Kettering Grammar School, having been completed in 1913 to the designs of John Alfred Gotch, in the Neoclassical style.

The municipal borough of Kettering was abolished in 1974 to become part of a larger non-metropolitan district called the Borough of Kettering, which also covered Burton Latimer, Desborough, Rothwell and several parishes from the former Kettering Rural District. Kettering itself became an unparished area. Barton Seagrave was re-established as a separate parish in 2002.

The borough of Kettering was abolished in 2021 to become part of the unitary authority of North Northamptonshire, which also took over county-level functions from the abolished Northamptonshire County Council. Concurrent with these changes, the unparished area of Kettering became a civil parish which also gained some land from Cranford and Barton Seagrave, which enabled it to establish a new town council. The new Kettering Town Council inherited the mayoralty from the former borough council.

=== Constituency ===
Kettering is represented in parliament by a constituency of the same name, which is currently (as of August 2024) represented by Labour MP Rosie Wrighting.

== Economy ==
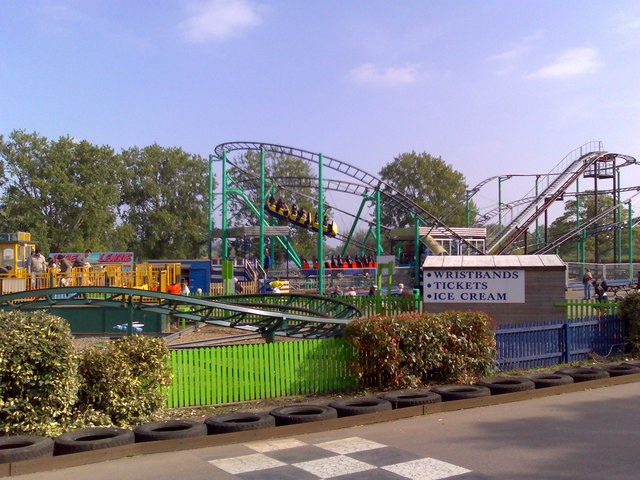
Wicksteed Park

Kettering's economy was built on the boot and shoe industry. With the arrival of railways in the 19th century, industries such as engineering and clothing grew up. The clothing manufacturer Aquascutum built its first factory there in 1909. Kettering's economy is now based on service and distribution industries due to its central location and transport links.

Kettering's unemployment rate is amongst the lowest in the UK and has over 80% of its adults in full-time employment. It is home to a wide range of companies including Aryzta, Weetabix, Pegasus Software, RCI Europe, Timsons Ltd and Morrisons Distribution as well as Wicksteed Park, the United Kingdom's second oldest theme park, which now plays host to one and a quarter million visitors every season. It has a very large free playground area, which was built by Wicksteed Playscapes, who are based in Kettering; the company is the world's oldest-known playground producer.

Kettering General Hospital provides Acute and Accident & Emergency department services for north Northamptonshire including Corby and Wellingborough. With its new £20 million campus, 16,000 students and 800 staff, Tresham College of Further and Higher Education is a significant employer in the region.

The former police station and social club on London Road has been closed down and as of 2020 the site is for sale. Northamptonshire Police have an enquiry desk situated within the Kettering Municipal Offices.

Kettering Business Park, a recent and current commercial property development undertaken by Buccleuch Property is situated on the A43/A6003, on the north side of Kettering. Many office buildings are being built as part of the project as well as a leisure sector with a new hotel. Many large distribution warehouses have been constructed in the area, creating thousands of jobs for the local economy.

Kettering's Heritage Quarter houses the Manor House Museum and the Alfred East Gallery. The magnificent Boughton House, Queen Eleanor cross and the 1597 Triangular Lodge are local landmarks within the borough. Sir Thomas Tresham was a devout Catholic who was imprisoned for his beliefs. When he was released he built Triangular Lodge to defy his prosecutors and secretly declare his faith.

The British sitcom Peep Show has various scenes located in Kettering owing to the head office of JLB, the company which employs lead character Mark Corrigan, being located there.

=== Regeneration ===
In March 2007, a project was revealed to refurbish and bring new leisure and shopping to the town centre, including water features, public art, sculptures, street furniture, trees, plants and an innovative pavement lighting scheme.

In the recent years, a new 'Cornerstone' initiative has been started by North Northamptonshire Council and SEMLEP (South East Midlands Local Enterprise Partnership), aiming to revitalise parts of the town centre, these being the Library, Alfred East Art Gallery (the only purpose-built art gallery in Northamptonshire) & the Manor House Museum and Gardens.

== Education ==
Primary Schools in Kettering include St Peter's School, an independent school, Park Road School, St Thomas More Catholic School, St Edward's Catholic Primary School, Compass Primary Academy, St Andrew's Church of England School, Hawthorn School, Greenfields Primary, St Mary's, Millbrook Junior School and a number of others associated with Secondary Academies. A new Church of England primary school, Hayfield Cross, opened in September 2015.

Kettering has four secondary schools, each with the ability to take on pupils after the age of 16 to allow pupils to complete their A-Levels and BTEC Diplomas. The four secondary schools located in the town are Bishop Stopford School, Kettering Science Academy, Kettering Buccleuch Academy and Southfield School for Girls. Both academies are joined to separate primary schools to allow for an easier transition from Key Stage 2 to Key Stage 3.

Latimer Arts College is also in the area and is located in the nearby village of Barton Seagrave. The school also has a sixth form facility, but no primary schools are specifically linked to them.

Kettering is also home to one of Tresham College of Further and Higher Education's three campuses. Tresham allows full and part-time students over the age of 16 to study a range of vocational courses such as Hairdressing and Beauty Therapy, ICT, Hospitality and Catering and Motor Vehicle Technology. Tresham College also offers Access to Higher Education courses and undergraduate courses in association with the University of Bedfordshire and University of Northampton.

== Transport ==
=== Roads ===
The following roads serve the town:

- A14 skirts to the west and south of the town centre, linking it with the A45 dual carriageway, M1 and M6motorways.
- A6003 to Corby
- A43 to Corby and the county town of Northampton
- A509 (Kettering/Wellingborough Road) to Wellingborough
- A6 to Rushden and Bedford.

=== Buses ===
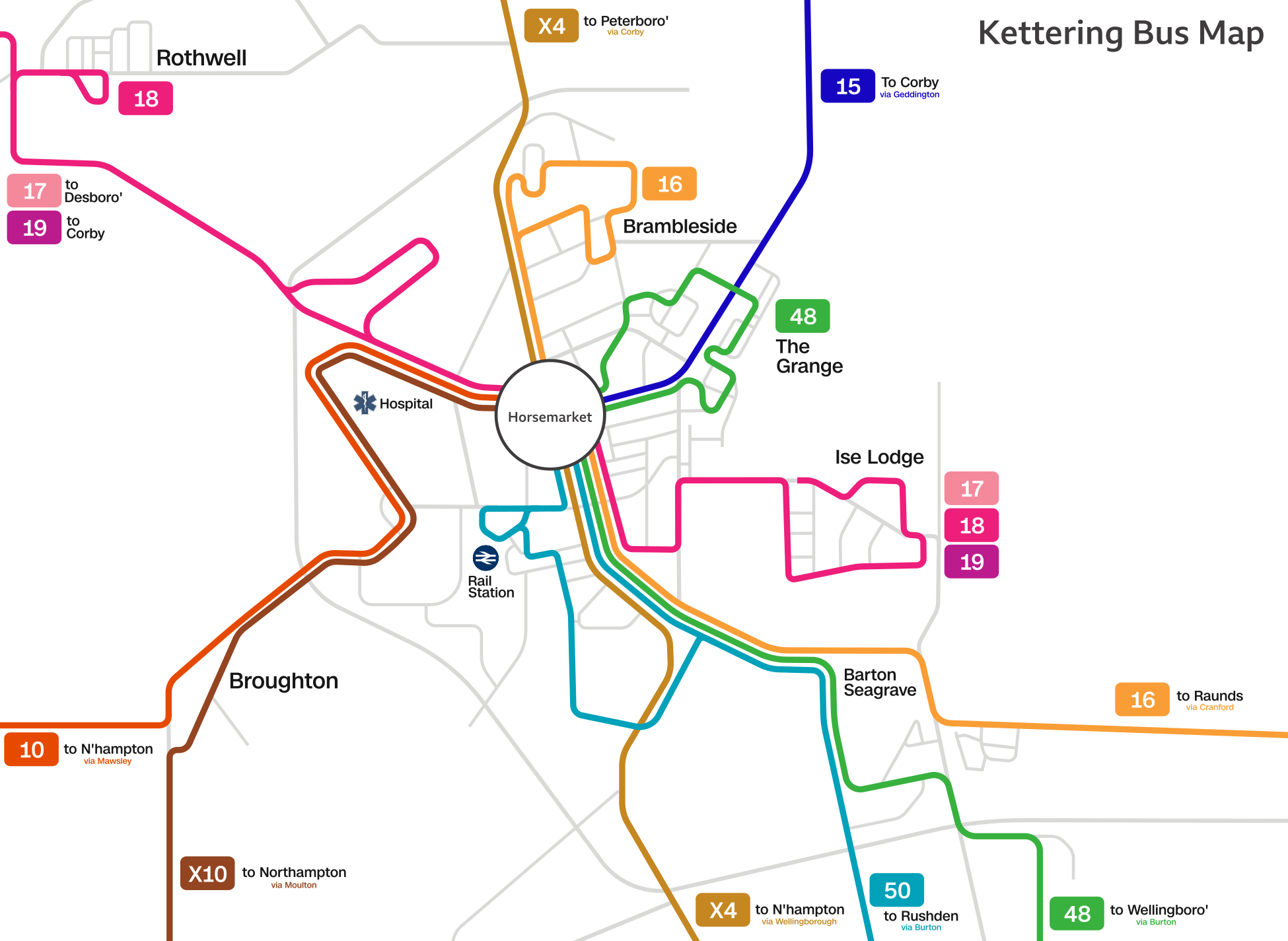
Kettering Bus Map in Autumn 2024

All buses serve the new Horsemarket bus interchange, with bus stops around the railway station and The Headlands.

Stagecoach Midlands operates the following routes:

- X4 – Peterborough – Oundle – Corby – Kettering – Wellingborough – Northampton
- 10 – Kettering – Mawsley – Moulton – Northampton
- X10 – Kettering – Broughton – Moulton – Northampton
- 15 – Kettering – Highfield Road – Stamford Road – Geddington – Corby
- 16 – Brambleside – Kettering – Cranford – Thrapston – Raunds
- 17 – Thrapston – Ise Lodge – Kettering – Telford Way – Rothwell – Desborough
- 18 - Ise Lodge – Kettering – Telford Way – Rothwell – Desborough – Market Harborough
- 19 – Ise Lodge – Kettering – Rothwell – Desborough – Rushton – Corby
- 48 – Stamford Road – Kettering – Burton Latimer – Irthlingborough – Wellingborough
- 50 – Kettering – Burton Latimer – Irthlingborough – Higham Ferrers – Rushden – Bedford.

=== Railway ===
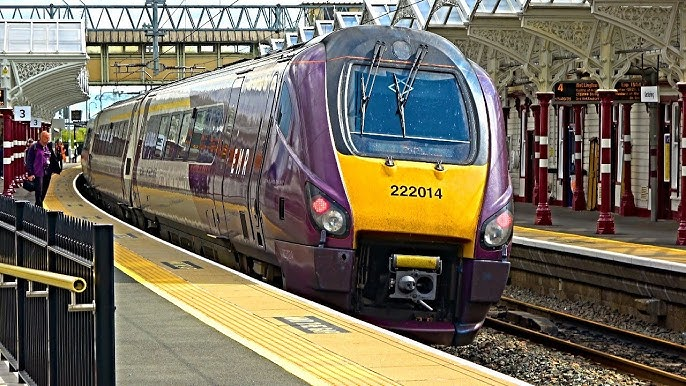
An inter-city train at Kettering station

Kettering railway station is a stop on the Midland Main Line. East Midlands Railway operates the following services:

- EMR Connect services depart every 30 minutes in each direction between London St Pancras and Corby. These trains stop at Wellingborough, Bedford, Luton and Luton Airport Parkway.
- Faster inter-city services also depart every 30 minutes in each direction between London St Pancras, Leicester and Nottingham, with an average journey time of 50 minutes to the capital.

St Pancras also provides an interchange with the Eurostar service to France and Belgium. Derby and Sheffield can be reached with a change at Leicester.

=== Air ===
There are five airports within two hours' drive of the town: Heathrow, Luton, East Midlands, Birmingham and Stansted. Luton and East Midlands can be reached directly by train, while Stansted and Heathrow can be reached by changing in London. Sywell Aerodrome, located 6 miles (9.7 km) south-west of Kettering, caters for private flying, flight training and corporate flights.

== Sport ==
The multi-purpose sports and business facility at the Kettering Conference Centre provides both a leisure centre, health club, children's activity and conference centre all in one venue. It is also the home to Volleyball England's National Volleyball Centre.

=== Snooker ===
The 2024 world snooker champion Kyren Wilson is from Kettering.

=== Football ===
Kettering Town is the town's football club, who as of the 2026–27 season play in the Southern League Premier Central, the 7-8th tier of English football. Kettering Town played their home matches at Latimer Park in the town until 2011. Following spells at Nene Park in Irthlingborough and Steel Park in Corby, as well as Rockingham road, the team currently plays at Latimer Park in Burton Latimer.

=== Rugby ===
Kettering is home to Kettering Rugby Football Club (KRFC), located in Waverley Road on the eastern side of the town. After a period of playing under Uppingham Public School Rules the club formally adopted RFU rules in 1875 and became a significant participant in both the local community and the fast-developing Rugby scene in the East Midlands. In the early days games were played on a number of sites including farmers' fields and council-owned grounds. It was during this period, prior to adopting a home of their own, that the club developed its high profile in the town.

=== Other ===
A short-lived greyhound racing track was opened on 4 July 1930 and raced on Friday evenings. The racing was independent (not affiliated to the sports governing body the National Greyhound Racing Club) and was known as a flapping track, which was the nickname given to independent tracks. It is not known how long the track traded.

The annual Kettering Half Marathon and 5K was first held on 9 March 2025. It was organised by RunThrough in partnership with Kettering Town Council and is licensed through RunBritain/UK Athletics.

== Climate ==
Kettering experiences an oceanic climate (Köppen climate classification) which is similar to most of the British Isles.

Climate data for Kettering, GBR
Month	Jan	Feb	Mar	Apr	May	Jun	Jul	Aug	Sep	Oct	Nov	Dec	Year
Mean daily maximum °C (°F)	7 (45)	8 (46)	11 (52)	13 (55)	17 (63)	19 (66)	22 (72)	23 (73)	19 (66)	14 (57)	10 (50)	7 (45)	14 (58)
Mean daily minimum °C (°F)	2 (36)	2 (36)	4 (39)	4 (39)	7 (45)	10 (50)	12 (54)	12 (54)	10 (50)	8 (46)	5 (41)	3 (37)	7 (44)
Average precipitation cm (inches)	4.51 (1.78)	3.39 (1.33)	2.87 (1.13)	4.39 (1.73)	3.49 (1.37)	4.66 (1.83)	4.21 (1.66)	4.69 (1.85)	5.49 (2.16)	5.68 (2.24)	4.8 (1.9)	4.98 (1.96)	53.16 (20.94)

== Media ==
Local news and television programmes are provided by BBC East and ITV Anglia. Television signals are received from the Sandy Heath TV transmitter.

The town's local radio stations are Northants 1 and Northants 2 from NN Media, a local media organisation, providing local information, news and advertising and specialises in providing media training for young people in Northamptonshire, they set up originally as Shire Sounds Radio to provide Kettering and the surrounding areas with a local radio station. The area also has BBC Radio Northampton on 103.6 FM, Heart East on 96.6 FM and Smooth East Midlands (formerly Connect FM) on 107.4 FM.

Kettering is served by two local newspapers: Northamptonshire Evening Telegraph and Northampton Chronicle and Echo.

In the BBC soap opera EastEnders, the character Sonia Fowler moved to Kettering between 2016 and 2017 for a new job, whilst actress Natalie Cassidy was on maternity leave. The town has been referenced several times in the soap since.

== Nearby places ==
Kettering's nearest towns are Desborough, Burton Latimer and Rothwell, with the larger towns of Corby and Wellingborough a little further away.

== Town twinning ==
Kettering is twinned with:

- Kettering, Ohio, United States
- Lahnstein, Germany
- Kettering, Tasmania, Australia.

== See also ==
- Kettering Ironstone Railway
- Kettering Grammar School
