= List of schools in North Northamptonshire =

This is a list of schools in North Northamptonshire, a unitary authority in the English county of Northamptonshire.

== State-funded schools ==
=== Primary schools ===
- Alfred Lord Tennyson School, Rushden
- All Saints CE Primary School and Nursery, Wellingborough
- The Avenue Infant School, Wellingborough
- Barton Seagrave Primary School, Barton Seagrave
- Beanfield Primary School, Corby
- Bozeat Community Primary School, Bozeat
- Brambleside Primary School, Kettering
- Brigstock Lathams CE Primary School, Brigstock
- Broughton Primary School, Broughton
- Compass Primary Academy, Kettering
- Corby Old Village Primary School, Corby
- Corby Primary Academy, Corby
- Cottingham CE Primary School, Cottingham
- Cranford CE Primary School, Cranford
- Croyland Primary School, Wellingborough
- Danesholme Infant Academy, Corby
- Danesholme Junior Academy, Corby
- Denfield Park Primary School, Rushden
- Earls Barton Primary School, Earls Barton
- Ecton Village Primary School, Ecton
- Exeter School, Corby
- Finedon Infant School, Finedon
- Finedon Mulso CE Junior School, Finedon
- Freemans Endowed CE Junior Academy, Wellingborough
- Geddington CE Primary School, Geddington
- Glapthorn CE Primary School, Glapthorn
- Grange Primary Academy, Kettering
- Great Addington CE Primary School, Great Addington
- Great Doddington Primary School, Great Doddington
- Greenfields Primary School and Nursery, Kettering
- Grendon CE Primary School, Grendon
- Gretton Primary School, Gretton
- Hall Meadow Primary School, Kettering
- Havelock Infant School, Desborough
- Havelock Junior School, Desborough
- Hawthorn Community Primary School, Kettering
- Hayfield Cross CE School, Kettering
- Hazel Leys Academy, Corby
- Henry Chichele Primary School, Higham Ferrers
- Higham Ferrers Junior School, Higham Ferrers
- Higham Ferrers Nursery and Infant School, Higham Ferrers
- Irchester Community Primary School, Irchester
- Irthlingborough Junior School, Irthlingborough
- Irthlingborough Nursery and Infant School, Irthlingborough
- Isham Church of England Primary School, Isham
- Kettering Buccleuch Academy, Kettering
- Kettering Park Infant Academy, Kettering
- Kettering Park Junior Academy, Kettering
- Kings Cliffe Endowed Primary School, Kings Cliffe
- Kingswood Primary Academy, Corby
- Little Harrowden Community Primary School, Little Harrowden
- Little Stanion Primary School, Corby
- Loatsland Primary School, Desborough
- Loddington CE Primary School, Loddington
- Mawsley Primary School, Mawsley
- Meadowside Primary School, Burton Latimer
- Mears Ashby CE Primary School, Mears Ashby
- Millbrook Infant School, Kettering
- Millbrook Junior School, Kettering
- Nassington Primary School, Nassington
- Newton Road School, Rushden
- Oakley Vale Primary School, Corby
- Oakway Academy, Wellingborough
- Olympic Primary, Wellingborough
- Oundle CE Primary School, Oundle
- Our Lady of Walsingham RC Primary School, Corby
- Our Lady's RC Primary School, Wellingborough
- Park Junior School, Wellingborough
- Polebrook CE Primary School, Polebrook
- Priors Hall School, Corby
- Pytchley Endowed CE Primary School, Pytchley
- Raunds Park Infant School, Raunds
- Redwell Primary School, Wellingborough
- Ringstead CE Primary School, Ringstead
- Rockingham Primary School, Corby
- Rothwell Junior School, Rothwell
- Rothwell Victoria Infant School, Rothwell
- Rushden Primary Academy, Rushden
- Rushton Primary School, Rushton
- Ruskin Academy, Wellingborough
- Ruskin Infant School, Wellingborough
- St Andrew's Church of England Primary School, Kettering
- St Barnabas Church of England Primary School, Wellingborough
- St Brendan's Catholic Primary School, Corby
- St Edward's Catholic Primary School, Kettering
- St Mary's CE Primary School, Burton Latimer
- St Mary's CE Primary School, Kettering
- St Patrick's RC Primary School, Corby
- St Peter's CE Academy, Raunds
- St Thomas More RC Primary School, Corby
- St Thomas More Catholic Primary School, Kettering
- South End Infant School, Rushden
- South End Junior School, Rushden
- Stanion CE Primary School, Stanion
- Stanton Cross Primary School, Stanton Cross
- Stanwick Academy, Stanwick
- Studfall Infant Academy, Corby
- Studfall Junior Academy, Corby
- Sywell CE Primary School, Sywell
- Thrapston Primary School, Thrapston
- Titchmarsh CE Primary School, Titchmarsh
- Trinity CE Primary School, Aldwincle
- Victoria Primary Academy, Wellingborough
- Warmington School, Warmington
- Warwick Academy, Wellingborough
- Weldon CE Primary School, Weldon
- Whitefriars Primary School, Rushden
- Wilbarston CE Primary School, Wilbarston
- Wilby CE Primary School, Wilby
- Windmill Primary School, Raunds
- Wollaston Community Primary School, Wollaston
- Woodford CE Primary School, Woodford
- Woodnewton School, Corby

=== Secondary schools ===
- Bishop Stopford School, Kettering
- Brooke Weston Academy, Corby
- Corby Business Academy, Corby
- Corby Technical School, Corby
- The Ferrers School, Higham Ferrers
- Huxlow Academy, Irthlingborough
- Kettering Buccleuch Academy, Kettering
- Kettering Science Academy, Kettering
- Kingswood Secondary Academy, Corby
- The Latimer Arts College, Barton Seagrave
- Lodge Park Academy, Corby
- Manor School, Raunds
- Montsaye Academy, Rothwell
- Prince William School, Oundle
- Rushden Academy, Rushden
- Sir Christopher Hatton Academy, Wellingborough
- Southfield School, Kettering
- Weavers Academy, Wellingborough
- Weldon Village Academy, Weldon
- Wollaston School, Wollaston
- Wrenn School, Wellingborough

=== Special and alternative schools ===
- Chelveston Road School, Higham Ferrers
- Friars Academy, Wellingborough
- Isebrook School, Kettering
- Kingsley Special Academy, Kettering
- Maplefields Academy, Corby
- Red Kite Academy, Corby
- Rowan Gate Primary School, Wellingborough
- Wren Spinney Community School, Kettering
- The CE Academy, Corby, Kettering and Wellingborough

=== Further education ===
- East Northamptonshire College
- Tresham College of Further and Higher Education

== Independent schools ==
=== Primary and preparatory schools ===
- Laxton Junior School, Oundle
- St Peter's School, Kettering

=== Senior and all-through schools ===
- Oundle School, Oundle
- Wellingborough School, Wellingborough

=== Special and alternative schools ===
- Progress Schools, Thrapston
- Refocus, Wellingborough
- Stone Lodge Therapeutic School, Kettering
- Youth Works Community College, Kettering
