= James Ashworth =

British recipient of the Victoria Cross (1989–2012)

Lance Corporal James Ashworth VC
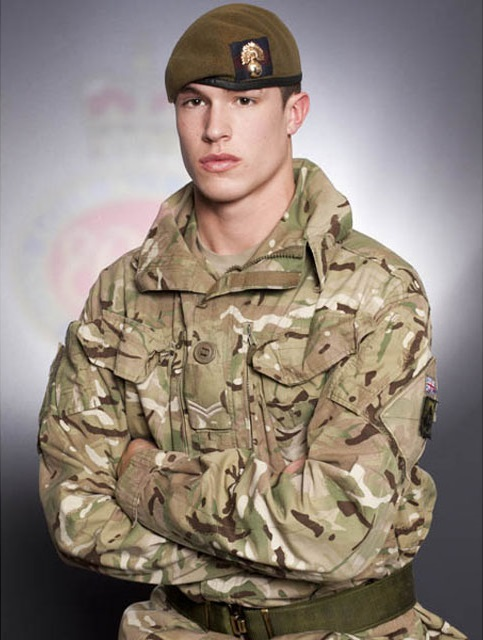
- Born: 26 May 1989; Kettering, Northamptonshire, England
- Died: 13 June 2012 (aged 23); Nahr-e Saraj District, Helmand Province, Afghanistan
- Burial place: Corby, Northamptonshire England
- Military career
- Allegiance: United Kingdom
- Branch: British Army
- Service years: 2006–2012 †
- Rank: Lance Corporal
- Service number: 25228593
- Unit: Grenadier Guards
- Conflicts: War in Afghanistan: Operation Herrick
- Awards: Victoria Cross

Lance Corporal James Thomas Duane Ashworth VC (26 May 1989 – 13 June 2012) was a British soldier and posthumous recipient of the Victoria Cross (VC), the highest award for gallantry in the face of the enemy that can be awarded to British and Commonwealth forces. He was killed in Afghanistan on 13 June 2012 as he led his fire team in an attack on an enemy-held compound. The award was gazetted on 22 March 2013, having been confirmed by the British Army earlier in the week. Ashworth is the 14th recipient of the award since the end of the Second World War.

== Early life ==
Ashworth lived and grew up in Corby, Northamptonshire, where he attended Lodge Park Technology College. A keen sportsman, he represented his school at both football and basketball.

In 2006, aged 17, Ashworth joined the British Army following his father who had previously served in the Grenadier Guards. Ashworth trained at the Infantry Training Centre in Catterick before being posted to Nijmegen Company, Grenadier Guards, which is focused on public duties and state ceremonial events in London.

He was identified as being capable of becoming a paratrooper and was assigned to the Guards' Parachute Platoon, which is part of 3rd Battalion, Parachute Regiment. In his three years in the platoon, he took part in Operation Herrick 8 and was deployed to exercises overseas on three occasions. He was deployed to Canada before joining the Reconnaissance Platoon for Operation Herrick 16.

== Death ==
Despite the ferocity of the insurgent's resistance, Ashworth refused to be beaten. His total disregard for his own safety in ensuring that the last grenade was posted accurately was the gallant last action of a soldier who had willingly placed himself in the line of fire on numerous occasions earlier in the attack. This supremely courageous and inspiring action deserves the highest recognition.

— Victoria Cross citation for James Ashworth VC

On 13 June 2012, Ashworth was serving as part of the Reconnaissance Platoon, 1st Battalion Grenadier Guards. He was on a patrol in the Nahri Saraj District of Helmand Province, Afghanistan. He was leading a fire-team, clearing out compounds, when his team came under fire from Taliban armed with rifles and rocket-propelled grenades from several mud huts. Ashworth charged the huts, providing cover for his team who followed in single file behind him. After his fire-team took out most of the insurgents, Ashworth pursued the final remaining member. He crawled forward under cover of a low wall while his team provided covering fire and acted as a diversion. When he got within 5 metres (16 ft) of the enemy, he was killed as he attempted to throw a grenade. Captain Michael Dobbin, commander of the platoon, who was awarded the Military Cross for repeated courage throughout the operational tour, said about Ashworth, "His professionalism under pressure and ability to remain calm in what was a chaotic situation is testament to his character. L/Cpl Ashworth was a pleasure to command and I will sorely miss his calming influence on the battlefield. Softly spoken, he stepped up to every task thrown in his direction." After his death, his body was taken to Camp Bastion and was then repatriated to the United Kingdom.

On 16 March 2013, British media reported that Ashworth was to be posthumously awarded the Victoria Cross for bravery and this was confirmed by the Ministry of Defence on 18 March 2013. His citation was read out at the Grenadier Guards’ barracks in Aldershot. He was only the second person to be awarded the medal during the Taliban insurgency, after Bryan Budd for his actions in 2006. Ashworth is the 14th person to be awarded the Victoria Cross since the end of the Second World War. The Victoria Cross was first awarded for actions in the Crimean War of 1854–56, and is the highest British military award.

== Victoria Cross citation ==
The announcement and accompanying citation for the decoration was published in supplement to the London Gazette on 22 March 2013, reading

St James’s Palace, London SW1

22 March 2013 The Queen has been graciously pleased to approve the award of the Victoria Cross to the under-mentioned:

ARMY

Lance Corporal James Thomas Duane Ashworth, Grenadier Guards, 25228593 (killed in action).

On the 13th June 2012 the conspicuous gallantry under fire of Lance Corporal Ashworth, a section second-in-command in 1st Battalion Grenadier Guards Reconnaissance Platoon, galvanised his platoon at a pivotal moment and led to the rout of a determined enemy grouping in the Nahr-e-Saraj District of Helmand Province.

The two aircraft inserting the Reconnaissance Platoon on an operation to neutralise a dangerous insurgent sniper team, were hit by enemy fire as they came into land. Unflustered, Ashworth – a young and inexperienced noncommissioned officer – raced 300 metres with his fire-team into the heart of the insurgent dominated village. Whilst two insurgents were killed and two sniper rifles recovered in the initial assault, an Afghan Local Police follow-up attack stalled when a patrolman was shot and killed by a fleeing enemy. Called forward to press-on with the attack, Ashworth insisted on moving to the front of his fire team to lead the pursuit. Approaching the entrance to a compound from which enemy machine gun fire raged, he stepped over the body of the dead patrolman, threw a grenade and surged forward. Breaking into the compound Ashworth quickly drove the insurgent back and into an out-building from where he now launched his tenacious last stand.

The village was now being pressed on a number of fronts by insurgents desperate to relieve their prized sniper team. The platoon needed to detain or kill the final sniper, who had been pinned down by the lead fire team, and extract as quickly as possible. Ashworth realised that the stalemate needed to be broken, and broken quickly. He identified a low wall that ran parallel to the front of the outbuilding from which the insurgent was firing. Although only knee high, he judged that it would provide him with just enough cover to get sufficiently close to the insurgent to accurately post his final grenade. As he started to crawl behind the wall and towards the enemy, a fierce fire fight broke out just above his prostrate body. Undaunted by the extraordinary danger – a significant portion of his route was covered from view but not from fire – Ashworth grimly continued his painstaking advance. After three minutes of slow crawling under exceptionally fierce automatic fire he had edged forward fifteen metres and was now within five metres of the insurgent’s position. Desperate to ensure that he succeeded in accurately landing the grenade, he then deliberately crawled out from cover into the full view of the enemy to get a better angle for the throw. By now enemy rounds were tearing up the ground mere centimetres from his body, and yet he did not shrink back. Then, as he was about to throw the grenade he was hit by enemy fire and died at the scene. Ashworth’s conspicuous gallantry galvanised his platoon to complete the clearance of the compound.

Despite the ferocity of the insurgent’s resistance, Ashworth refused to be beaten. His total disregard for his own safety in ensuring that the last grenade was posted accurately was the gallant last action of a soldier who had willingly placed himself in the line of fire on numerous occasions earlier in the attack. This supremely courageous and inspiring action deserves the highest recognition.

== Personal life ==
Ashworth played football both for his regiment and for a local team near his home. He has two sisters and two brothers, one of whom is also a soldier.
