= Oakley Vale =

Coordinates: 52.47°N 0.71°W

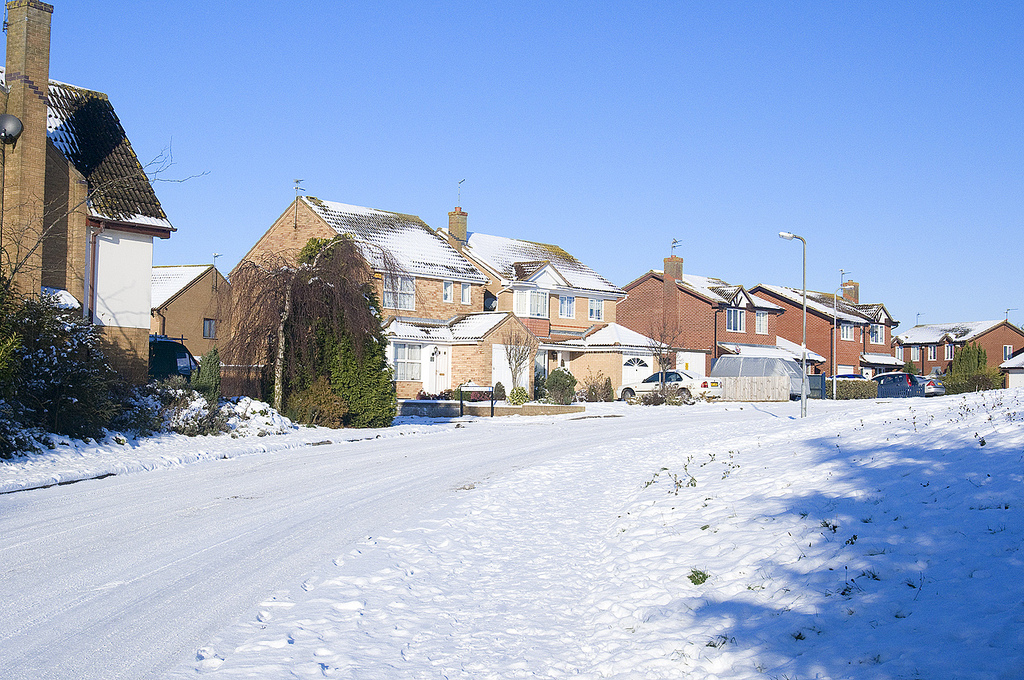
Oakley Vale in snow

Oakley Vale is a 436-acre (1.76 km^{2}) housing development situated in the south west of Corby, England. The development began in 2001, and over 2000 houses have now been built. The adjacent area of Snatchill, developed from around the mid-1990s, is often regarded as being within the Oakley Vale development boundary.

Oakley Vale contains a mix of housing types ranging from small apartments to large five or six bedroomed family homes. The cost of housing at levels lower than the UK average and the proximity to the East Midlands main line have attracted homebuyers from more expensive surrounding areas and even as far afield as London.

Local services in Oakley Vale includes a parade of shops at Charter Court on Butland Road. Oakley Vale Primary School was opened in 2008 and Brooke Weston Academy is located in the Oakley Vale development.

Located in the south west of Corby, Oakley vale is within a few miles of the A14 road (England) and just 23 miles (38 km) of the UK motorway network via the M1 motorway (Great Britain) and the M6 motorway The development is 2 miles (3 km) from Corby railway station providing fast links to London St Pancras station.
