= List of schools in Northamptonshire =

There is no county-wide local education authority in Northamptonshire, instead education services are provided by the two smaller unitary authorities of North Northamptonshire and West Northamptonshire:

- List of schools in North Northamptonshire
- List of schools in West Northamptonshire
