= KBA =

KBA may refer to:

- The Korea Basketball Association
- The Koenig & Bauer AG
- Knowledge-based authentication of a person accessing a service
- Kenn Borek Air, an airline based in Calgary, Alberta, Canada, ICAO code
- Key Biodiversity Area
- Kettering Buccleuch Academy, a school in Kettering, Northamptonshire
