= Rothwell Urban District =

Rothwell Urban District could refer to:

- Rothwell Urban District, Northamptonshire
- Rothwell Urban District, Yorkshire
