= William Ball & Son Limited =

- Industry: Agricultural Implements Manufacturers
- Founded: 1809, Rothwell, Northamptonshire
- Founder: William Ball
- Defunct: 1970-1979
- Fate: Bought by the Burgess Group ca.1900-1910 & disestablished ca. 1970-1979
- Headquarters: Rothwell, Northamptonshire
- Number of employees: 17 Wheelwrights & Body Makers, 32 Blacksmiths, Strikers, Moulders, Foundrymen (ca. 1900)

William Ball & Son Limited was an agricultural implements manufacturing firm based at The Royal Implements Works (Ball's Foundry), Rothwell, Northamptonshire from 1809 to about 1900, when it was bought by the Burgess Group and subsequently disestablished in the 1970s. The firm was established by William Ball (1766-ca.1820-40), and following his death run by his son William Ball (1803 County Sligo, Ireland- 20 March 1877, Rothwell, Northamptonshire). The firm attained royal patronage from the Kingdom of England, French Empire, Kingdom of Belgium & German Confederation and is notable for attaining First Class Medals at the Paris Exhibition 1855, The Great Exhibition 1851 & Great Industrial Exhibition 1853. The Firm's Agricultural Implements were exported globally to the Dutch East Indies and Colonies of Australia and New Zealand.

William Ball's 1862 Catalogue of Agricultural Implements details the most important Agricultural Implements being the Patent Criterion Prize Plough, The Royal Society's First Prize Wagons and Carts, Ridging and Double Ploughs, Leverage Scarifiers, and Iron Harrow. Ball's Criterion Plough was the only Plough to have taken a First-class Medal at each of the three Great Exhibitions (England, Ireland & France), received Eight Prizes from the Royal Agricultural Society of England, Two Best Plough Silver Medals from the Staffordshire Agricultural Society and First Prizes from Agricultural Societies in Australia and New Zealand. The Criterion Prize Colonial Plough was 'made to meet the requirements of colonists, for breaking up roots and stones, and bringing new land into a state of cultivation.' A letter from Riccarton, New Zealand, which had taken four months to arrive, was printed on 1 June 1861 in the Northampton Mercury, showing the worldwide interest surrounding the implements made at Ball's Foundry.

"The Following is a copy of a letter received by Mr. Ball of Rothwell, from David Hight, late of Broughton, Northamptonshire, now living at Riccarton, New Zealand" "Riccarton, Canterbury, New Zealand, January 28th, 1861."

"Dear Sir, I take the first opportunity of writing to you after receiving the four ploughs you sent me, which arrived quite safe and sound. I have great joy to inform you they are very highly spoken of. I have been working one myself, and had many of my neighbours round to see it, and after they saw its work I could have sold a dozen of them. I am very sorry I did not send for more, as there are no ploughs in this part of the colony."''
