= East Northamptonshire College =

School consortium in Northamptonshire, England

Coordinates: 52.3037°N 0.5881°W

The East Northamptonshire College
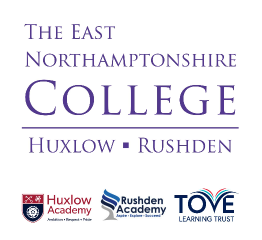

Information
- Former name: FHMR Sixth Form Consortium
- Established: 1995
- Trust: Tove Learning Trust
- Director: Mrs J Holmes
- Age: 16 to 19

The East Northamptonshire College or TENC for short is a consortium of secondary schools in East Northamptonshire that offer Post-16 education.

== Structure ==
The consortium consists of two secondary schools, Rushden Community College based in Rushden, and Huxlow Academy based in Irthlingborough. The college provides free transport to the different schools so all students can get to individual lessons.

== Range of courses ==
Because there are two different schools, the college can offer a greater range of courses than a normal Sixth Form College. As the college is split between two schools, the government's inspectors - Ofsted - do not inspect the college as a whole but the individual school's sixth forms when secondary education is inspected. This then gives two different reports on how the sixth form is being managed at different schools. The college is officially based at Rushden Community College, where the director and administrative staff are also based.

== History ==
=== 1995 - 2015: The FHMR Consortium ===
The East Northamptonshire College was originally named the FHMR 6th Form Consortium and comprised four local schools: The Ferrers School based in Higham Ferrers, Rushden Community College based in Rushden, Huxlow Academy based in Irthlingborough, and Manor School and Sports College in Raunds. A brochure from 2002 shows that the consortium offered a range of the then-new AS levels, traditional A Levels, and GNVQs.

The original FHMR Logo

The name FHMR stood for 'Ferrers, Huxlow, Manor, Rushden', the shortened names of each of the member schools.

==== 4Schools ====
A group of students and alumni received a grant of £40,000 in 2001 to create the website www.4schools.org, which was a semi-official internet homepage for the consortium until 2008.

=== 2015 - 2023: Name Change and Three Schools ===
In 2015 the consortium rebranded as The East Midlands College and lost Manor School and Sports College which decided to set up its own sixth form provision as part of its new partnership with the Nene Education Trust. Free transport links continued between the remaining three schools, with the sixth form's base of operations moving to Rushden Academy.

=== 2023 - Present: Two Schools, One Academy ===
In 2023, The Ferrers School set up an independent sixth form in their newly renovated post-16 education centre. The consortium, now consisting of two schools, continues to offer a range of courses across and free transportation between locations. During the transition period, the website continues to list contact information for The Ferrers School, but new marketing focusses on the dual roles of Huxlow Academy and Rushden Academy under the Tove Learning Trust.
