= Cowthick Quarry =

Coordinates: 52.482°N 0.639°W

- Site of Special Scientific Interest
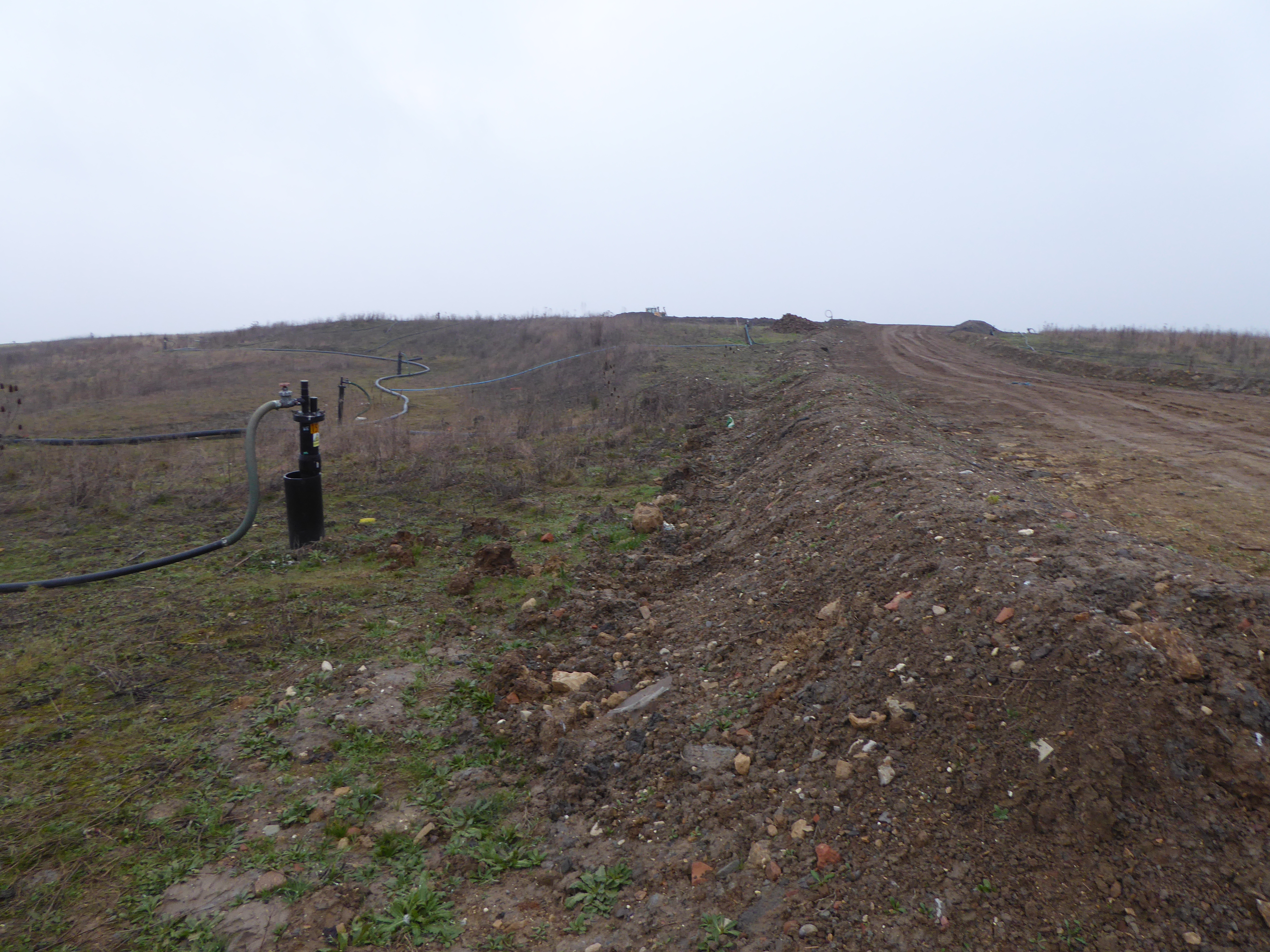
- Location of Cowthick Quarry.
- Area of search: Northamptonshire
- Grid reference: SP 925 879
- Interest: Geological
- Area: 1.4 hectares
- Notification date: 1985
- Location map: Magic Map

Cowthick Quarry is a 1.4-hectare (3.5-acre) geological Site of Special Scientific Interest east of Corby in Northamptonshire.

This site exposes Middle Jurassic rocks dating to 174 to 163 million years ago and, in the view of Natural England, it has "the best of most instructive sections" of the period in the Midlands. A Pleistocene fault has caused the juxtaposition of six Jurassic formations.

The site is on private land with no public access. It was turned into landfill and covered over during the 2000s.
