= Corby Power Station =

Gas-fired power station in England

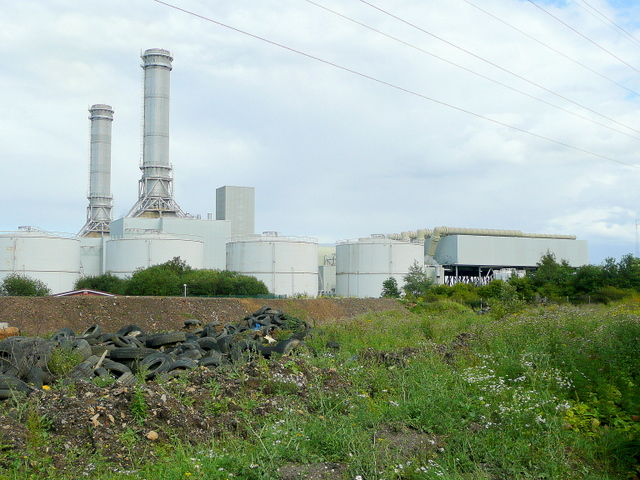
- Corby Power Station; Viewed from the west in July 2009
- Country: England
- Location: Northamptonshire, East Midlands
- Coordinates: 52.510941°N 0.68139°W
- Construction began: 1993
- Commission date: 1994
- Operators: East Midlands Electricity, ESB International & Hawker Siddeley (1994–2000); Powergen & ESB International (2000–2004); E.ON UK & ESB International (2004–2011); ESB (2011–Present)

Thermal power station
- Primary fuel: Natural gas

Power generation
- Nameplate capacity: 350 MW

External links
- Commons: Related media on Commons

Corby Power Station is a 350 MWe gas-fired power station on Mitchell Road (A6116) in the north-east of Corby in Northamptonshire. It is near (to the west of) the Rockingham racetrack.

== History ==
The station was originally owned by East Midlands Electricity, with smaller shares owned by Hawker Siddeley and ESB International (the Republic of Ireland's national electricity company), under the name Corby Power Ltd. It was constructed by Hawker Siddeley Power Engineering, Ewbank Preece (became part of Mott MacDonald in 1994), and Kier. It opened in February 1994.

In September 2000, East Midlands Electricity (owned by the American Dominion Resources) sold off its 80% stake of the power station to Powergen. ESB owned the other 20%. Powergen became E.ON UK in 2004. In October 2000, the ownership changed to 50% Powergen and 50% ESB International.

ESB acquired in May 2011 EON's share of the station becoming the single owner of the plant.

== Operations ==
The power station is a combined cycle power plant. It has two 119 megawatt (MW) General Electric Frame 9 (9001E) gas turbines produced by EGT. Each has a Babcock Energy heat recovery steam generator. These lead onto one 114 MW steam turbine. The station's generators were built by Brush.
