= Rothwell Gullet =

Nature reserve in Northamptonshire, England

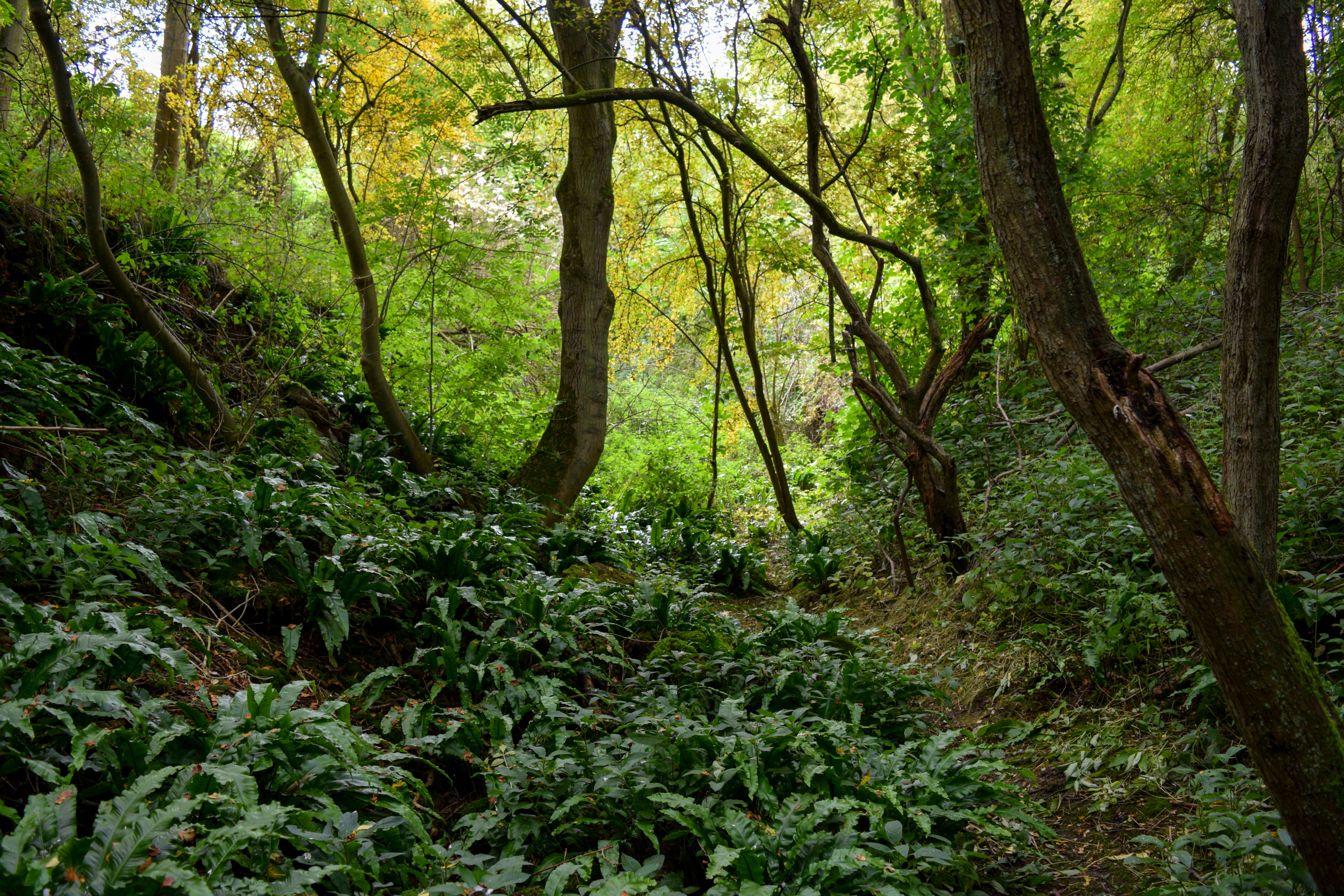
- Hart's tongue fern (Asplenium scolopendrium) at the bottom of the gullet.

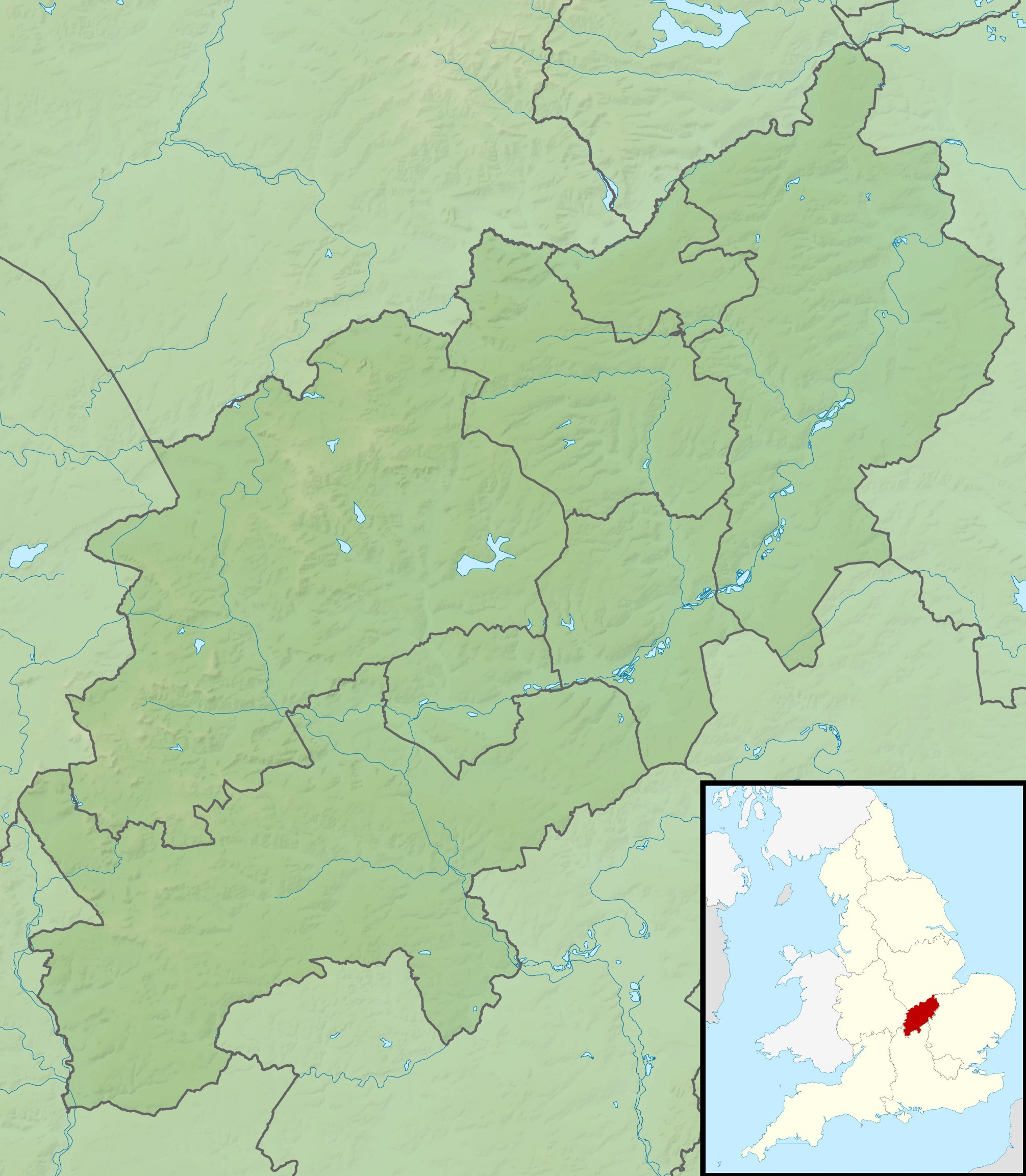
- Location within Northamptonshire
- Location: near Rothwell, Northamptonshire
- Coordinates: 52°25′41.14″N 0°48′54.55″W
- Area: 1.6 hectares (4.0 acres)
- Operator: Wildlife Trust for Bedfordshire, Cambridgeshire and Northamptonshire
- Status: Open all year

Rothwell Gullet (grid reference SP806818) is a 1.6-hectare (4.0-acre) nature reserve near Rothwell, Northamptonshire. It is owned and managed by the Wildlife Trust for Bedfordshire, Cambridgeshire and Northamptonshire.

The reserve is composed of an old ironstone quarry and a grassland area. It is well known for the swathes of hart's-tongue fern that cover the damp bottom of the gullet.

== Wildlife ==
Rothwell Gullet contains two primary habitat types, grassland and woodland. When quarrying of the site ceased, the gullet was left and natural succession has since created a dense woodland. Owing to the damp nature of the exposed rock faces in the bottom of the gullet, it has become colonised by hart's-tongue fern.

To the west of the gullet, a grassland area surrounded by scrub and hedgerows supports a variety of plants including meadow vetchling and hop trefoil.

== Management ==
The woodland area is thinned to maintain structural diversity and encourage ground flora. Grazing of livestock during the autumn and winter removes excess vegetation in the grassland area and prevents scrub encroachment.
