= Rushden Academy =

Location
- Hayway; Rushden, Northamptonshire, NN10 6AG; England; 52.298°N 0.605°W

Information
- Type: Academy
- Established: 1977
- Trust: Tove Learning Trust
- Department for Education URN: 146209 Tables
- Ofsted: Reports
- Principal: Jonathan Firth
- Staff: 91
- Gender: Co-educational
- Age: 11 to 18
- Enrolment: 784
- Website: http://www.rushden-academy.net

Rushden Academy is an Academy school in Rushden, Northamptonshire, which was founded in 1977. The school was formerly the Chichele College for Girls until 1991 when it was amalgamated to become The Rushden School, rebranding as the Rushden Community College in 2005 and as Rushden Academy in 2014. There were 784 students in Years 7 to 13 on roll in the 2018-2019 college year, including the Sixth Form which is shared with two other local schools.

== Achievement ==
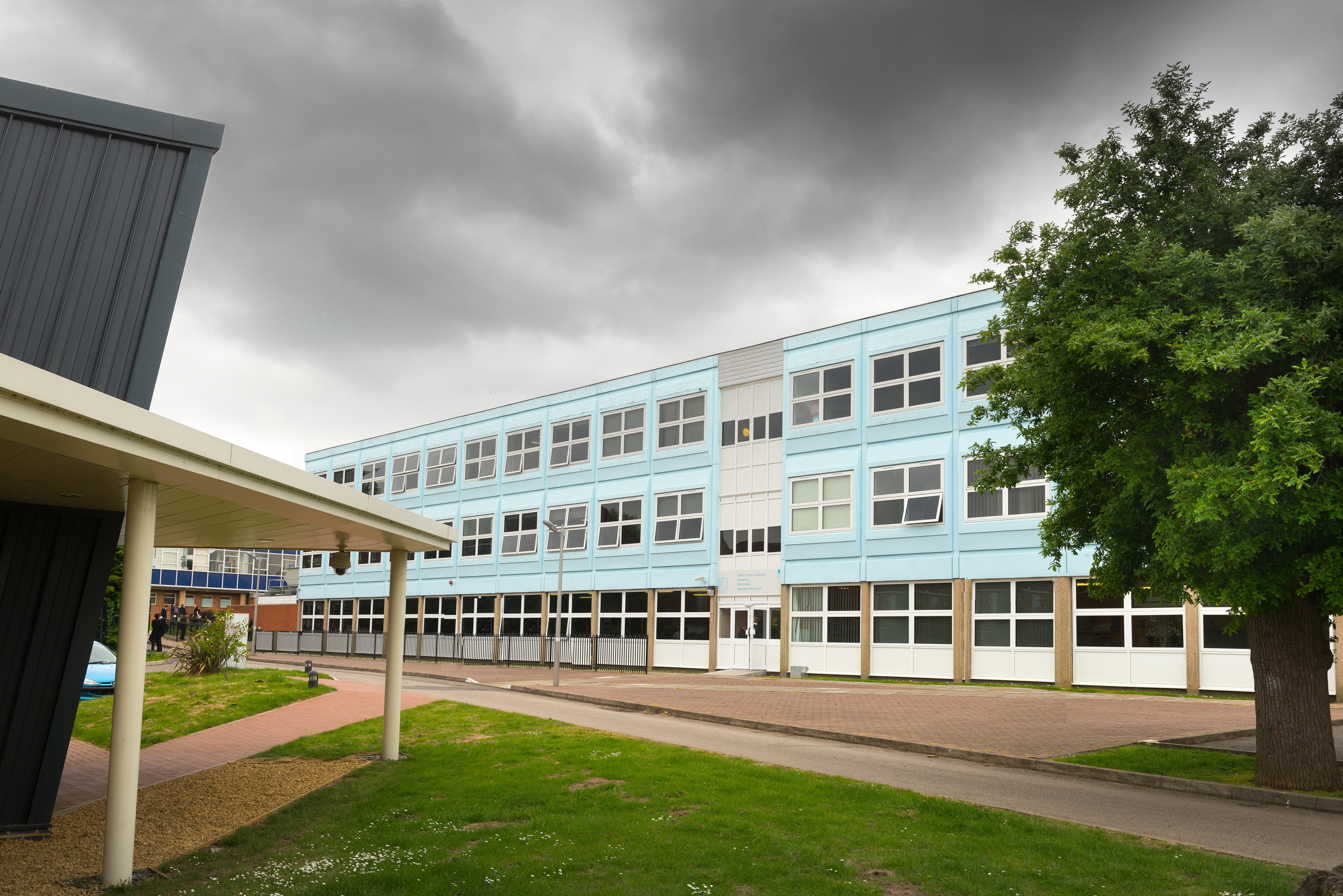
Rushden Community College

The school was found to be Good by Ofsted during their last visit in September 2022.

== Feeder schools ==
The College gains over 95% of its Year 7 students from ten local feeder schools.

- South Rushden: Whitefriars Primary School, South End Junior School and Rushden Primary Academy
- North Rushden: Denfield Park Primary School
- Central Rushden: Alfred Lord Tennyson School
- West Rushden: Newton Road School
- Higham Ferrers: Higham Ferrers Junior School and Henry Chichele Primary School
- Village: St Lawrence VA Primary School and Christopher Reeves VA Primary School

== Sixth form provision ==
The college's sixth form is part of the East Northamptonshire College with two other local schools (Huxlow Academy and The Ferrers School).

== Academy Status ==
On 1 December 2012 the Rushden Community College became an academy with sponsorship through The Education Fellowship Trust based in Northamptonshire, with partners including John Lewis and Waitrose. In 2015 the Trust was told by the Department of Education that it must urgently improve students' achievement. In March 2017 The Education Fellowship gave up all 12 of its schools after financial problems and concerns regarding poor outcomes for pupils. On 1 May 2018 the Academy came under the control of the Tove Learning Trust.
