= Brooke Weston Academy =

Location
- Coomb Road; Corby, Northamptonshire, NN18 8LA; United Kingdom; 52.4672°N 0.7127°W

Information
- Type: Academy
- Established: 1991
- Department for Education URN: 135317 Tables
- Ofsted: Reports
- Principal: Clare Haworth
- Gender: Mixed
- Age: 11 to 18
- Enrolment: 1,196 pupils
- Colours: Blue and Silver
- Website: http://www.brookeweston.org/

Brooke Weston Academy is an Academy in Corby, Northamptonshire, United Kingdom, teaching pupils from ages 11 to 18. It has consistently placed very highly in GCSE league tables and has an above average value added score at Key Stage 4. The value added score for Key Stage 5 is below average nationally, but slightly higher than the Northamptonshire average. Attainment on entry is well above average and the proportions of pupils with learning difficulties and disabilities or eligible for free school meals are much lower than average.

== Background ==
Founded in 1991, the school was opened as a City Technology College. The college's catchment area includes Corby, Kettering and surrounding towns and villages. Two businessmen, Hugh de Capell Brooke, a local landowner, and Garry Weston, owner of Associated British Foods, donated land and funded the initial building of the school respectively, along with additional grants from the W. Garfield Weston Foundation. The school opened in September 1991 under the name Brooke City Technology College. The name was changed 18 months later to reflect the continued support offered from the Weston Foundation.

== Principals ==
- Gareth Newman CBE: 1991 - 1999. Was appointed a CBE in 1997 in recognition of his services to education. The library at Brooke Weston is named after him in his honour.
- Sir Peter Simpson OBE: 1999 - 2007. Was appointed an OBE in recognition of his services to the school. He was knighted in the Queen's Birthday Honours 2011.
- Trish Stringer: 2007–2015 (former Executive Principal for the Brooke Weston Trust)
- Sam Strickland (Associate Principal): 2015 - 2016
- Peter Kirkbride: 2016–2020
- Shaun Strydom 2020–2024
- Clare Haworth 2024–present

== Information technology ==
The school makes use of electronic whiteboards in all classrooms, learning bases and study rooms. Every pupil and member of staff has their own user accounts and storage areas.

The school was one of the first to take on board the GNVQ IT, in place of the GCSE. The transitional year of 1998 saw other subject classes cancelled for entire week blocks to bring the pupils into the new qualification having previously studied the GCSE. In addition many Design & Technology classes were cancelled to be replaced with IT classes.

== Online curriculum ==
The school produced and sold an ‘online curriculum’. This consists of a range of interactive learning materials and online tasks which all relate to various subject areas. The school's subsidiary company, @tain, sells access to the content to other schools. In addition, the school also provided training days which allowed teaching staff from other schools to attend seminars at the school and learn the methods in which the school taught the courses provided on its online curriculum and how to maximise the effectiveness of using it in a classroom environment.

With the redevelopment of the vocational courses in 2010, Brooke Weston decided to not produce materials for the new specifications.

== School traditions ==
Each year, the school holds its annual sports day at Corby Triangle near Rockingham where it displays almost all popular track and field disciplines.

Brooke Weston holds an annual prizegiving in September of each year, celebrating the achievements of the pupils for the previous academic year. Prizes are awarded in each year for individual subjects (with the exception of Year 11 and Year 13), pupil of the year, and also recognition for academic success in GCSE and A Level.

== Other facilities ==
The school also has a Design Technology suite, with CAD/CAM facilities and a laser cutter. The CAD/CAM suite also includes an A3 colour laser printer. The department also includes two workshops including CNC lathes, wood-turning lathes, metal working lathes, scroll saws and pillar drills, jig-saws and clamps. The department also features facilities for textiles and sewing as well as an area for pupils to review and edit design plans digitally using a range of programmes. It was refurbished in 2008 at a cost of £250,000. The school also has its own video editing studio with chroma-key (blue-screen) facility.

== Recent development ==
In September 2008, Brooke Weston converted to an Academy. £5 million of Government money has been invested in the school, which has resulted in the construction of a new Creative and Digital Arts Centre. Opened on 9 October 2009, this has expanded the school's music and drama performing facilities alongside a new TV studio and kitchens, which will allow Food Technology to be taught. The entire school building underwent a refurbishment to coincide with the opening of the new department.

== Controversy ==
In January 2013, Brooke Weston issued an apology after an email criticising a pyjama day was accidentally sent from vice principal, Mark Willimott, to children's cancer charity 'Chelsea's Angels', who suggested the event. Willimott had intended to forward the email with his comments to a colleague, but inadvertently addressed it to charity founder Michelle Tompkins too, writing:

"AM I MISSING SOMETHING??? FYI although are they aiming for a paedophile's paradise????"

In August 2015, Willimott was arrested for possessing and distributing indecent images of children. He pleaded guilty to all four charges facing him, including one count of making 300,546 indecent images of children, one count of making 773 indecent images of children, one count of distributing 128 indecent images, and one count of possession of an extreme pornographic image showing the act of intercourse with an animal. None of the images were of children at Brooke Weston. In April 2016, Willimott was sentenced to two years in prison for the charge of distributing images, eight months in prison for each of the charges of making images, and one month in prison for a further charge of possessing an extremely indecent image involving an animal. A statement from Brooke Weston said:

"Brooke Weston Academy is shocked and appalled by Mark Willimott’s conduct. The police investigation determined that none of the activity took place using school equipment or involved any of our pupils. The safety of pupils at the Academy has and will always be our paramount concern and we have robust safeguarding procedures which have been complied with.”

== Brooke Weston Trust ==
The school is in partnership with the Corby Business Academy, which has replaced the former Corby Community College. The former principal of Corby Business Academy, Dr. Andrew Campbell, is the Chief Executive of the Academy Trust, with principals Simon Underwood and Nicola Treacy (Joint Heads of School) and Peter Kirkbride respectively in charge of each school.

In September 2009, the Partnership became partly responsible for the running of the new Kettering Science Academy. This 3-18 school replaced both the Ise Community College and Henry Gotch Primary School.

== Academic performance ==
=== 2007 ===
86% of Brooke Weston pupils achieved the equivalent of 5 or more A*-C GCSEs including English and maths.

=== 2008 ===
Brooke Weston achieved a 100% A level pass rate. 86% of Brooke Weston pupils achieved the equivalent of 5 or more A*-C GCSEs including English and maths (100% A*-C GCSEs).

=== 2009 ===
81% of Brooke Weston pupils achieved the equivalent of 5 or more A*-C GCSEs including English and Maths. It also achieved a 100% A*-C pass rate. Nearly a quarter of all 183 pupils achieved 10 or more A* or A grades, and exactly a third of all grades awarded were an A or A*. Three pupils achieved 17 A* and A grades (including GNVQ ICT), and 2 pupils achieved the equivalent of 19 GCSEs.
In A Level, Brooke Weston achieved a 100% pass rate, including 48% of those being an A or B grade. In five subjects, all entries received A grade achievements.

=== 2010 ===
Pupils at Brooke Weston achieved an 86% pass rate of A*-C grades in GCSE including Maths and English. 38% of all grades awarded were A* or A, and seven pupils achieved 17 GCSEs each. Top performing pupils achieved 15 A* or A grades. Brooke Weston also achieved its, at the time, best ever A Level results this year, with a 100% pass rate. 61% of grades awarded were A*/A+B, and the average UCAS point score for each pupil also increased significantly.

=== 2011 ===
84% of pupils achieved 5 or more A*-C GCSEs including English and Maths, with 37% of all GCSE grades awarded either an A* or A grade.
On average pupils attained 15 GCSEs.
100% of pupils passed all the A Levels they sat. 68% of all A Level exams were graded at A*/A or B (up 7% from the year before), with 6% of all exam entries being awarded an A* grade. The average UCAS point score increased to 379 (equivalent to 3 A grades per pupil), up from 334 from the previous year.

=== 2012 ===
87% of pupils achieved 5 or more A*-C GCSE passes including English and Maths, a 3% increase on the year before. The 100% GCSE pass rate was extended to a ninth year. 41% of all entries were graded at A* or A.
64% of A Level exams were graded at A*/A or B, a decrease of 4% from the previous year. The average points score also decreased marginally to 361, which remains as the equivalent of three A grades. However, there was a 4% increase in the number of A* grades awarded, up to 10% in 2012.

=== 2013 ===
72% of pupils achieved 5 or more A*-C grade GCSE passes including English and Maths, a significant drop from previous years. On average, each pupil achieved 14 GCSEs graded A*-C, and 47 pupils achieved at least 8 A* or A grades. 40% of entries were awarded A* or A.
The school's, at the time, best ever A-Level results were celebrated in 2013.

=== 2014 ===
84% of pupils achieved 5 or more A*-C GCSE passes, up 8% from the year before. Excluding ICT, 21% of all entries were graded at A* or A. Of the year 11 cohort, 73% gained a GCSE in Modern Foreign Languages, a significant improvement compared to previous years. 92% of entries for Mathematics were graded A*-C, replicating the school's record.
2014 was a year of change in GCSE examinations; had previous accountability measures been used, 100% of pupils would have secured 5 A*-C grades, and 39% of all entries awarded A* or A.
61% of all A-Level entries were awarded A*, A or B, and 86% of all entries graded A*-C. The overall average point score was 336 UCAS points, equating to a grade profile of AAB.
17 pupils achieved a profile of 3 A*/A grades, and 3 pupils a profile of 4 A*/A grades. 39% of all entries were awarded A* or A.

=== 2015 ===
90% of pupils achieved 5 A*-C grades at GCSE, with 84% of the cohort securing English, Maths and at least three other GCSEs. 28% of all grades awarded were either A* or A. The academy celebrated its best ever A-Level Results. It was also the sixth consecutive year that pupils have performed at an outstanding level, with an average score per pupil of 381 UCAS points, indicating that, on average, pupils achieved three A grades each.

=== 2016 ===
83% of year 11 pupils secured A* to C grades, or equivalent, in five or more subjects at GCSE. 77% of the cohort secured English, mathematics and at least three other GCSEs or Level 2 qualifications. Almost a quarter of all grades awarded were A*/A or Distinction.
55% of all A-Level entries were graded at A*/A/B and 83% of grades were A*- C. The overall average point score per pupil was 325, indicating an ABB profile.

=== 2017 ===
93% of year 11 students secured grades 9 to 4 in the newly reformed English qualifications and 88% of the cohort secured the same in Mathematics. Over a quarter of all grades were awarded A*/A, or the new equivalent 9 to 7 measure.

62% of all A-Level entries were graded at A*/A/B, marking an increase of six per cent from last year. 16 subjects of the 27 offered at Brooke Weston Academy increased their A*/A/B outcomes for students.

=== 2018 ===
85% of Year 11 students secured grades 9 to 4 in English, 85% in maths and 91% in science. The new ‘strong pass’ or grade 5 also saw outcomes of 73% attained in English, 69% in mathematics and 82% in science. 32% of all grades were awarded A*/A, or the new equivalent 9 to 7 measure, and over 8% achieved the new ‘A**’ grade 9 with 126 grades awarded across all subjects.

81% of A-Level students achieved A*-C across all subjects and 53% of all entries were graded at A*/A/B at A Level only. Nine subjects increased their A*/A/B outcomes for students in comparison to last year.

=== 2019 ===
86% of Year 11 students secured grades 9 to 4 in English and 87% in Mathematics. The new ‘strong pass’ or grade 5 also saw outcomes of 72% in English and 73% in Mathematics. Almost a third of all grades were awarded 9 to 7 Grades. Over 40% of students achieved the English Baccalaureate at Grade 5 or above, more than double the national average.

85% of A-Level students achieved A*-C and almost 60% of all entries were graded at A*/A/B.
