= Lodge Park Academy =

Location
- Shetland Way; Corby, Northamptonshire, NN17 2JH; England
- Coordinates: 52.50191°N 0.72127°W

Information
- Type: Academy
- Motto: Broadening Horizons
- Department for Education URN: 139060 Tables
- Ofsted: Reports
- Sponsor: The David Ross Education Trust
- Head teacher: Jonathon Kirby
- Gender: Coeducational
- Age: 11 to 18
- Houses: Goshawk; Kestrel; Red Kite; Osprey
- Website: http://www.lodgeparkacademy.co.uk/

Lodge Park Academy is a coeducational secondary school and sixth form with academy status, located in Corby, Northamptonshire, England.

== Background ==
Founded in 1964 as Lodge Park School, it was one of the first wave of specialist schools designated in 1994 and was renamed Lodge Park Technology College.

In January 2013 Lodge Park became an Academy in partnership of the David Ross Education Trust.

== Awards ==
The college has received a number of awards including Investor in People, ArtsMark Gold, the International Schools Award and ICT Mark.

== Previous Principals ==
The principals of Lodge Park have been Neville Rumbelow, Richard Parker, Tom Waterworth, Guy Shearer, David Yates, Toby Mullins, Alison Hayes, Darren Gadsby, Leo Gilbert, Meena Wood, Robert Sloan, Carly Waterman and Ruth Roberts. Jonathon Kirby became Principal in November 2024.

== Ofsted judgements ==
In 2019 the school was inspected with an outcome of Inadequate – Special Measures.

In 2021 the school was rated 'requires improvement' following an Ofsted inspection.

== Sports ==
The academy is currently Northamptonshire Sports School of the year, Corby Sports School of the year and holds both the School Games Gold Kitemark and the YST Gold Quality Mark.

== Notable former pupils ==
- James Ashworth VC, British soldier and posthumous recipient of the Victoria Cross

== Lodge Park Trust ==
Lodge Park is a Trust School, in partnership with the David Ross Education Trust.
