= Huxlow Academy =

Location
- Finedon Road; Irthlingborough, Northamptonshire, NN9 5TY; England; 52.329°N 0.621°W

Information
- Type: Academy
- Motto: Ambition Respect Pride (Formerly "Opening doors to brighter futures")
- Established: 1962
- Trust: Tove Learning Trust
- Department for Education URN: 149433 Tables
- Ofsted: Reports
- Headteacher: Kim Isaksen
- Gender: Co-educational
- Age: 11 to 18
- Houses: Golden Eagles; Green Ospreys; Blue Falcons; Red Kites
- Website: www.huxlow.northants.sch.uk

Huxlow Academy is a secondary school and sixth form with academy status, located in Irthlingborough, Northamptonshire, England. Previously a specialist Science College, the school converted to academy status in April 2012. However, the name only changed to Huxlow Academy in late 2022. There are just over 800 students on roll, including around 100 students in the sixth form, which is shared with another local school in the same trust. The head teacher is Kim Isaksen.

== History ==
It was founded in 1962 and was originally known as Finedon and Irthlingborough Secondary Modern School. It became known as Huxlow Academy in August 2022. The former head teacher was Paul Letch. He joined the school in September 2021, replacing Steve Gordon. The headteacher before Gordon was Mick Malton.

== Sixth form provision ==
The sixth form is shared with Rushden Academy as part of the TOVE Learning Trust 6th form provision. It was previously part of The East Northamptonshire College (TENC).

== School performance and inspections ==
The school's Ofsted report in 2016 judged the school as good in all main areas (achievement, quality of teaching, behaviour and leadership/management). The 2021 inspection rated the school inadequate. The inspectors found that racist, homophobic and sexist language was commonplace. The inspection in 2025 gave a good rating for behaviour, personal development, leadership and the sixth form. They gave a rating of requires improvement for the quality of education.

The percentage of students achieving grade 5+ GCSEs in English and Maths was:

- 2023: 30.6%
- 2024: 26.9%
- 2025: 30.7%

== Conviction of art teacher ==
In 2017, the school's art teacher was found to have allowed pupils to take inappropriate photographs for an art project. She was banned from teaching in 2022 by the Teaching Regulation Agency.
