= Weavers Academy =

Secondary school in Northamptonshire

Location
- Brickhill Road; Wellingborough, Northamptonshire, NN8 3JH; England
- Coordinates: 52.3008°N 0.7129°W

Information
- Type: Academy
- Department for Education URN: 139819 Tables
- Ofsted: Reports
- Head teacher: Jon Hunt
- Gender: Coeducational
- Age: 11 to 18
- Enrolment: 1,232
- Houses: Dragon; Griffen; Phoenix; Unicorn
- Website: www.weaversacademy.org.uk

Weavers Academy (Weavers School) is a co-educational secondary school and sixth form with academy status, located in Wellingborough in the English county of Northamptonshire.

Formerly a Technical Grammar School, it went on to become Weavers School, a community school administered by Northamptonshire County Council. It then briefly became a foundation school before converting to academy status in September 2013, and was renamed Weavers Academy. The school is now sponsored by the Creative Education Trust, but Weavers Academy continues to coordinate with North Northamptonshire Council for admissions.

Weavers Academy offers GCSEs, BTECs and OCR Nationals as programmes of study for pupils, while sixth form students can choose to study a range of A Levels and further BTECs.

In 2002, Weavers School became the first educational establishment in England to have a serving police officer based on its premises. Two years later, the school was placed in special measures by the Office for Standards in Education, Children's Services and Skills (Ofsted).
