= Montsaye Academy =

Location
- Greening Road; Rothwell, Northamptonshire, NN14 6BB; England

Information
- Type: Academy
- Motto: "Respect, Honesty, Compassion"
- Established: 2000
- Local authority: North Northamptonshire
- Trust: United Learning
- Department for Education URN: 137049 Tables
- Ofsted: Reports
- Principal: Gopal Baria
- Staff: 150
- Gender: Coeducational
- Age: 11 to 18
- Enrolment: 1,083
- Colour: Grey (7–11)
- Website: www.montsaye.northants.sch.uk

Montsaye Academy is a coeducational secondary school and sixth form in Rothwell, England. As an academy it was granted dual specialty status in late 2004, adding humanities to its existing language specialism.

The school received a good report from Ofsted in January 2019, but received an inadequate review from Ofsted in 2024. Montsaye is also the site of the Rothwell Swimming Pool, which has a sports centre used by the community as well as the school.

The pupils who attend the school are aged 11–18 (years 7–13) and come mainly from Desborough and Rothwell, as well as surrounding villages. The school had around 1274 students and around 100 members of staff as of 2009.

== History ==
The school was opened in 1955, but the older buildings have been remodelled and developed. Since becoming a comprehensive school in 1976, Montsaye has more than doubled in size and has had a series of building extensions.

In 2004/05, building work took place which has provided additional teaching areas for Mathematics and Science, an I.C.T suite, refurbished administrative accommodation and a visitor reception area. In addition, the sixth form area was remodelled in order to provide an educational support centre, new laboratories and an extension to the library to provide study facilities and a resource base. More recently, a project funded by the Big Lottery has provided the college and community with a sports facility consisting of four badminton courts, a sports hall and a refurbished swimming pool. In 2011 a new block costing £6 million was constructed to the north of the school to cater for engineering diploma students. However, it was not possible to be used for this purpose and is now the sixth form centre, as well as containing a gym for school and public use. The original sixth form location has now been converted into an extra music classroom and a new canteen.

The college was granted language college status in September 2000 and in September 2004 was granted humanities college status as a second specialism. In 2007, the school was granted vocational college Status as its third status.

On 1 August 2011 the college was converted to an academy. Before this, the school was called Montsaye Community College.

In December 2025, the academy became part of the United Learning trust.

== Notable former pupils ==
- Rosie Wrighting, Labour MP for Kettering
