= Kettering Science Academy =

School in Northamptonshire, England

Location
- Deeble Road; Kettering, Northamptonshire, NN15 7AA; England; 52.396448°N 0.707724°W

Information
- Type: Academy
- Established: 1969
- Department for Education URN: 135967 Tables
- Ofsted: Reports
- Principal: Jennie Giovanelli
- Gender: Mixed
- Age: 11 to 19
- Enrolment: 1,327
- Colour: Purple
- Website: www.ketteringscienceacademy.org

Kettering Science Academy is a secondary and sixth form school in Kettering, Northamptonshire, England, teaching pupils from age 11 to 18. It is a member of the Brooke Weston Trust and moved into a new building in September 2012. As of September 2023 there are 1327 students enrolled throughout the main school and the sixth form.

== Ofsted Inspection History ==
Date Of Inspection	Result
11 July 2023	Good
22 October 2019	Requires Improvement
16 May 2017	Requires Improvement
12 May 2015	Requires Improvement
18 September 2013	Requires Improvement
28 September 2011	Requires Improvement
