= Kettering Buccleuch Academy =

Location
- Weekley Glebe Road; Kettering, Northamptonshire, NN16 9NS; England; 52°24′46″N 0°42′38″W

Information
- Type: Academy
- Established: 2009
- Department for Education URN: 135966 Tables
- Ofsted: Reports
- Principal: Chloe Buckenham
- Gender: Mixed
- Age: 4 to 18
- Enrolment: 1,617
- Website: http://kba.uk

Kettering Buccleuch Academy is a mixed all-through school and sixth form located in Kettering in the English county of Northamptonshire. The school educates pupils from the age of 4 to 18.

The school was formed in 2009 from the merger of Avondale Infants School, Avondale Junior School and Montagu School (secondary). The name of the school refers to the Dukes of Buccleuch, who have had connections with Kettering stretching back for almost 500 years. The school moved into a new combined building on the former Montagu School site in 2013.

The school is an academy sponsored by United Learning, and offers GCSEs and BTECs as programmes of study for pupils, while sixth form students can choose to study from range of A Levels and further BTECs.

The school has recently started a programme involving local musical artists. A Junior Andre concert was planned for 2025 but ultimately did not happen.
