= Corby Business Academy =

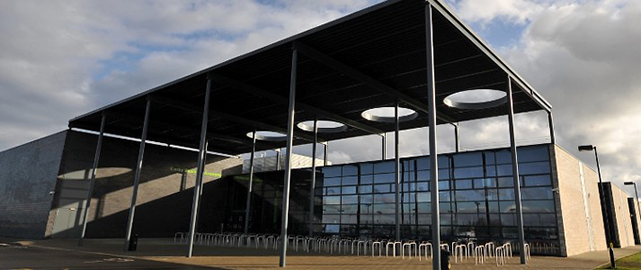

Location
- Gretton Road; Corby, Northamptonshire, NN17 5EB; England; 52.5085°N 0.6421°W

Information
- Type: Academy
- Motto: Commit, believe & achieve .
- Founder: 2008
- Local authority: North Northamptonshire
- Department for Education URN: 135306 Tables
- Ofsted: Reports
- Head teacher: Kerry Prior
- Gender: Coeducational
- Age: 11 to 18
- Enrolment: 1,087
- Colours: Green, Black
- Website: http://www.corbybusinessacademy.org

Corby Business Academy is a non-selective, co-educational state-funded secondary school in Corby, Northamptonshire, for the ages of 11–18 years. It is one of a group of Academy schools run by Brooke Weston Trust. The school has a sixth form for students aged 16–19.
