= Corby =

Town in Northamptonshire, England

Coordinates: 52.48768°N 0.70130°W

- Town and civil parish
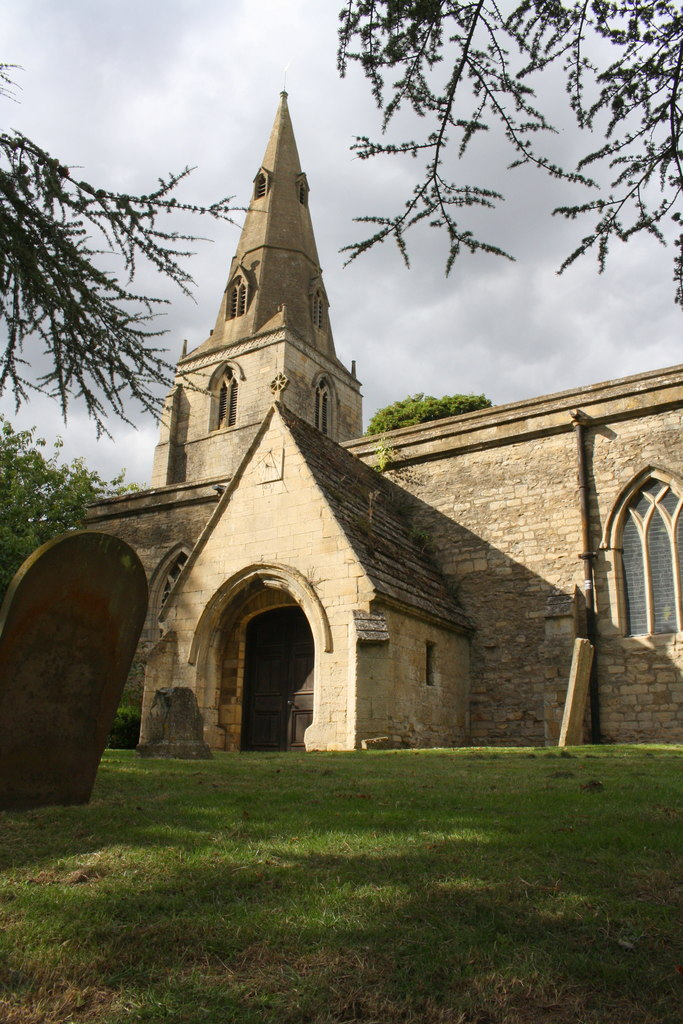
- St John the Baptist Church

- Location within Northamptonshire
- Area: 19.5125 km^{2} (7.5338 sq mi)
- Population: 62,341 (2021 census)
  - Density: 3,195/km^{2} (8,280/sq mi)
- OS grid reference: SP882885
- Civil parish: Corby
- Unitary authority: North Northamptonshire
- Ceremonial county: Northamptonshire
- Region: East Midlands
- Country: England
- Sovereign state: United Kingdom
- Areas of the town: List: Cottingham; Great Oakley; Rockingham; Snatchill; Stanion; Weldon
- Post town: Corby
- Postcode district: NN17, NN18
- Dialling code: 01536
- Police: Northamptonshire
- Fire: Northamptonshire
- Ambulance: East Midlands
- UK Parliament: Corby and East Northamptonshire
- Website: Corby Town Council

Corby is a town and civil parish in the North Northamptonshire district, in Northamptonshire, England, 23 miles (37 km) northeast of Northampton. In 2021, the parish had a population of 62,341, while the wider built-up area had a population of 68,160. From 1974 to 2021, it was the administrative headquarters of the Borough of Corby; at the 2021 census, the former borough had a population of 75,571.

Corby was once known as "Little Scotland" due to the large number of Scottish workers who came to work in its steelworks. Corby has undergone regeneration with the opening of Corby railway station and Corby International Pool in 2009 and the Corby Cube in 2010. The Cube houses a 450-seat theatre, public library and other community amenities.

Corby unparished area within the former Corby district, the district was abolished in 2021 and the unparished area became parished

== History ==
=== Early history ===
Mesolithic and Neolithic artefacts have been found in the area surrounding Corby and human remains dating to the Bronze Age were found in 1970 at Cowthick. The first evidence of permanent settlement comes from the 8th century when Danish invaders arrived and the settlement became known as "Kori's by" – Kori's settlement. The settlement was recorded in the Domesday Book of 1086 as "Corbei". Corby's emblem, the raven, derives from an alternative meaning of this word. These Danish roots were recognised in the naming of the most southern of the town's housing estates, Danesholme, around which one of the Danish settlements was located.

Corby was granted the right to hold two annual fairs and a market by Henry III in 1226. In 1568 Corby was granted a charter by Elizabeth I that exempted local landowners from tolls (the fee paid by travellers to use the long-distance public roads), dues (an early form of income tax) and gave all men the right to refuse to serve in the local militia. A popular legend is that the Queen was hunting in Rockingham Forest when she (dependent on the legend) either fell from her horse or became trapped in a bog whilst riding. Upon being rescued by villagers from Corby she granted the charter in gratitude for her rescue. Another popular explanation is that it was granted as a favour to her alleged lover Sir Christopher Hatton.

==== Corby Pole Fair ====
The Corby Pole Fair is an event that has taken place every 20 years since 1862 in celebration of the charter. The 1942 fair was not held due to the Second World War; it took place five years later. According to a newspaper report dated 14 June 1862 which focuses on the extravagances of the fair, the fugitive slave John Anderson was described as being educated in the Corby British School, giving the town an unusual link to slavery in the United States.

The most recent pole fair was held on Friday, 3 June 2022, to coincide with The Queen's Platinum Jubilee celebrations.

=== From rural village to industrial town ===
The local area has been worked for iron ore since Roman times. An ironstone industry developed in the 19th century with the coming of the railways and the discovery of extensive ironstone beds. By 1910 an ironstone works had been established. In 1931 Corby was a small village with a population of around 1,500. It grew rapidly into a reasonably sized industrial town, when the owners of the ironstone works, the steel firm Stewarts & Lloyds, decided to build a large integrated ironstone and steel works on the site. The start of construction in 1934 drew an inflow of population, including Scottish and Irish labourers. The first steel was produced in October 1935 and for decades afterwards the steel works dominated the town. By 1939 the population had grown to around 12,000, at which time Corby was thought to be the largest "village" in the country, but it was at that point that Corby was re-designated an urban district (see the Local Government section below).

=== 1940s and 1950s ===
During the Second World War the Corby steelworks were expected to be a target for German bombers but in the event there were only a few bombs dropped by solitary planes and there were no casualties. This may be because the whole area was blanketed in huge dense black, low-lying clouds created artificially by the intentional burning of oil and latex to hide the glowing Bessemer converter furnaces at the steelworks from German bomber crews. The only known remaining scars from German attacks can be found in the form of bullet holes visible on the front fascia of the old post office in Corby village. The Corby steelworks made a notable contribution to the war effort by manufacturing the steel tubes used in Operation Pluto (Pipe Line Under the Ocean) to supply fuel to Allied forces on the European continent.

In 1950, with a population of 18,000, Corby was designated a New Town with William Holford as its architect. By 1951, he prepared the development plan with a car oriented layout and many areas of open space and woodland. In 1952, Holford produced the town centre plan and in 1954 the layout for the first 500 houses. The town now underwent its second wave of expansion, mainly from Scotland. Corby is famous for its Scottish heritage based on decades of incoming steel workers and was for a time known locally as "Little Scotland".

=== Decline of the steel industry ===
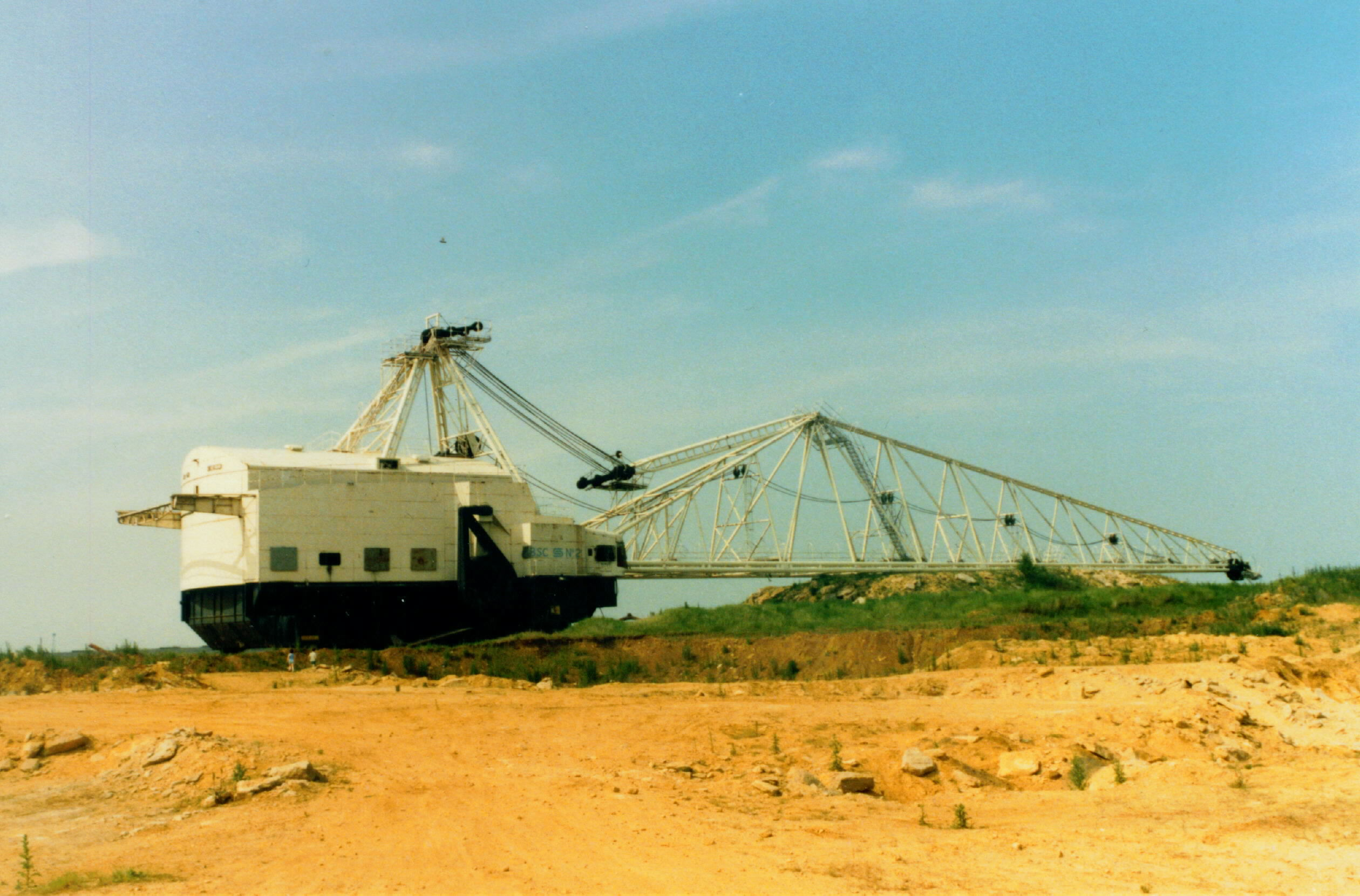
Sundew dragline excavator was a local landmark

In 1967 the British steel industry was nationalised and the Stewarts & Lloyds steel tube works at Corby became part of British Steel Corporation. The Government approved a ten-year development strategy with expenditure of £3,000 million from 1973 onwards, the objective of which was to convert BSC from a large number of small scale works, using largely obsolete equipment, to a far more compact organisation with highly competitive plant. Steelmaking was to be concentrated in five main areas: South Wales, Sheffield, Scunthorpe, Teesside, and Scotland, most of which are coastal sites with access to economic supplies of iron-rich imported ores.

It was not until 1975 that a closure programme was agreed upon after a 14-month review by Lord Beswick, then Minister of State for Industry. Corby was not one of the Beswick plants named to close in the review. By this time BSC was plunging into loss and important parts of the investment programme were held back. The European Union's Davignon Plan had also asked for steel capacity in Europe to be significantly reduced.

In May 1979, the new Conservative government minister, Sir Keith Joseph, announced the closure of Corby Steelworks. By the end of 1981 more than 5,000 jobs had been lost from British Steel in Corby, and further cuts took the total loss to 11,000, leading to an unemployment rate of over 30%. Steel tube making continued, however, initially supplied with steel by rail from Teesside and later from South Wales.

The title track of Steeltown by Big Country is about the loss of jobs in Corby.

The ensuing redevelopment of the location of the former Corby Steelworks led to the Corby toxic waste case.

=== Redevelopment ===
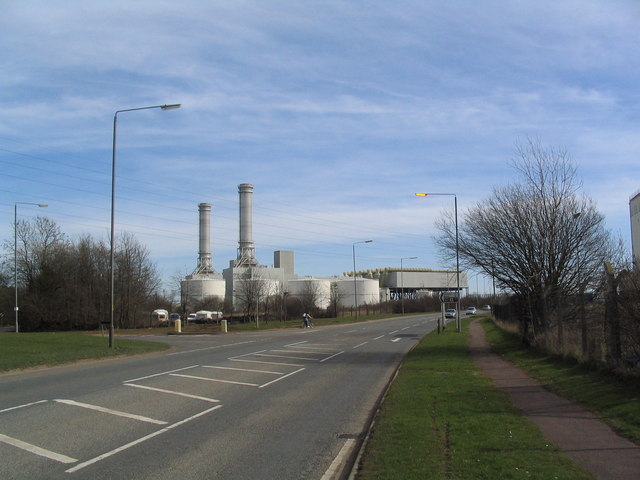
Corby's CCGT power station

Corby was designated as a new town in 1950. Most of the housing in the town has been built since this date. The first new street completed was Bessemer Grove, about the same time that the re-built blast furnace was lit. New industry was subsequently attracted to the town when the Thatcher government designated it as an Enterprise Zone. By 1991 unemployment had returned to the national average. The recovery of Corby was explained in 1990 by John Redwood, then a junior minister in the Department of Trade and Industry, as being a result of the establishment of the Enterprise Zone, the promotion of Corby by the Thatcher government, the work of private investors and the skills of the work force. Others believe the town's recovery was significantly assisted by its central location and substantial grants from the EU. The enterprise zone was promoted by the Corby Industrial Development Centre through a prospectus that parodied The Economist, titled The Ecorbyist; publication continued at least as late as 1994.

To the north of Corby, on the industrial estates, is a 350MW power station built in 1994; and the Rockingham Motor Speedway built in 2001.

== Politics ==
Corby constituency

From 1894 until 1939 Corby was a parish in Kettering Rural District, in 1939 Corby became an urban district, on 1 April 1974 the urban district and parish were abolished and Corby became an unparished area in Corby non-metropolitan district.

The town of Corby is entirely within the Corby and East Northamptonshire Westminster constituency. This contains parts of traditionally Conservative East Northamptonshire that balance the traditionally Labour town of Corby, leading to a marginal constituency that has gone to the party forming the UK Government at every general election since the creation of the constituency in 1983.

From 1983 to 1997 the seat was narrowly held for the Conservatives by William Powell. Phil Hope then won the seat for Labour and held it until 2010 when he lost to the writer Louise Bagshawe, the Conservative Party candidate, who became Louise Mensch after her marriage the following year.

In 2012, Mensch resigned as an MP and the resulting by-election was won by Labour's Andy Sawford with a majority of 7,791 votes over the Conservatives. UKIP finished in third place whilst the Liberal Democrats finished in fourth place, losing their deposit. The by-election was of national and international media interest due to the constituency being a marginal seat. During the wait for the results announcement, "Corby" briefly trended worldwide on Twitter.

Tom Pursglove regained the seat for the Conservatives in the 2015 general election, outpolling Sawford by a majority of 2,412. Pursglove retained the seat in 2017 with a majority of 2,690 and then by 10,268 in 2019, ahead of Labour candidate Beth Miller on both occasions. Following slight boundary changes, and with the seat now officially referred to as Corby and East Northamptonshire, the 2024 general election saw Pursglove lose the seat to Labour's Lee Barron whose majority was 6,331.

In the 2016 referendum on the UK's membership of the European Union, Corby voted 64% in favour of leaving whilst only 36% voted to remain in the EU. The turnout was 74.1% with the leave vote winning with a majority of 9,141 votes. The constituency's MP at the time, Tom Pursglove, had also been in favour of the UK leaving the European Union being one of the founders of Grassroots Out, the pro-Brexit organisation largely supported by Conservative and UKIP politicians.

Between 1979 and its abolition in 2021, Corby Borough Council was controlled by the Labour Party.

On 8 December 2014, Northamptonshire Police began an investigation into financial dealings by Corby Borough Council. In July 2013, Conservative councillors Rob McKellar and David Sims handed the "suspicious" findings of an audit report to the police to see if a crime had been committed. The audit report examined four major projects, including the Corby Cube, the cost of which went from £35m to £47m. It was reported in 2016 that the investigation had concluded and no prosecutions would be brought.

In March 2018, following Northamptonshire County Council becoming insolvent, due to financial and cultural mismanagement by the cabinet and officers, the then Secretary of State for Local Government, Sajid Javid, sent commissioner Max Caller into the council, who recommended the county council and all district and borough councils in the county be abolished, and replaced by two unitary authorities, one covering the West, and one the North of the county. These proposals were approved in April 2019. It meant that the districts of Daventry, Northampton and South Northamptonshire were merged to form a new unitary authority called West Northamptonshire, whilst the second unitary authority North Northamptonshire consists of the former Corby, East Northamptonshire, Kettering and Wellingborough districts. These new authorities came into being on 1 April 2021. Elections for the new authorities were due to be held on 7 May 2020, but were delayed due to the COVID-19 pandemic, and were instead held on 6 May 2021. On 1 April 2021 a civil parish called Corby Town was formed. On 1 January 2024 the parish was renamed to "Corby".

In the local elections of 6 May 2021, for North Northamptonshire Council Corby returned 12 Labour Councillors and 3 Conservative Councillors across 5 wards, with the Conservatives only being elected in the Corby Rural Ward. The newly created Corby Town Council returned 17 Labour Councillors across 4 Wards. In 2022, Corby Town Councillor Tafadzwa Chikoto became the first black mayor of Corby, and in 2023 Leanne Buckingham became the town's first openly lesbian mayor.

In the local elections of 1 May 2025, 9 Reform UK and 2 Labour councillors were returned to North Northamptonshire Council from wards in the Corby parish, as Reform UK won overall control of the council from the Conservatives. In the election to Corby Town Council, Labour retained overall control of the parish-level authority.

== City status bid ==
In 2012, Corby bid to gain city status as part of Queen Elizabeth II's Diamond Jubilee celebrations. However, it lost out to Perth, Chelmsford and St Asaph.

== Elections ==
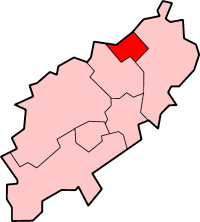
Borough of Corby

- 2003 Corby Borough Council election
- 2007 Corby Borough Council election
- 2012 Corby by-election
- 2015 Corby Borough Council election

== Society and culture ==
It is recorded in 1851 that the accent spoken in the northern parts of Northamptonshire would be more recognisable as a "West Country dialect". Scottish migration to Corby has created a unique population in the borough. The link with Scotland is a strong feature of the area: according to the 2001 Census, there were 10,063 Scottish-born in the Corby Urban Area – 18.9% of the population. A further 1.3 per cent were born in Northern Ireland. It has been estimated that a further third of the population are Scottish or of Scottish descent.

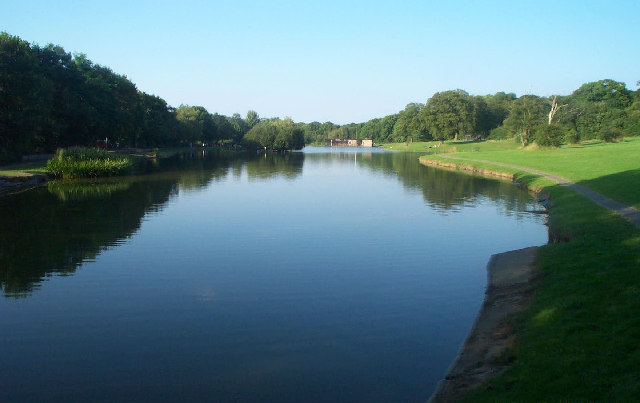
Corby's boating lake

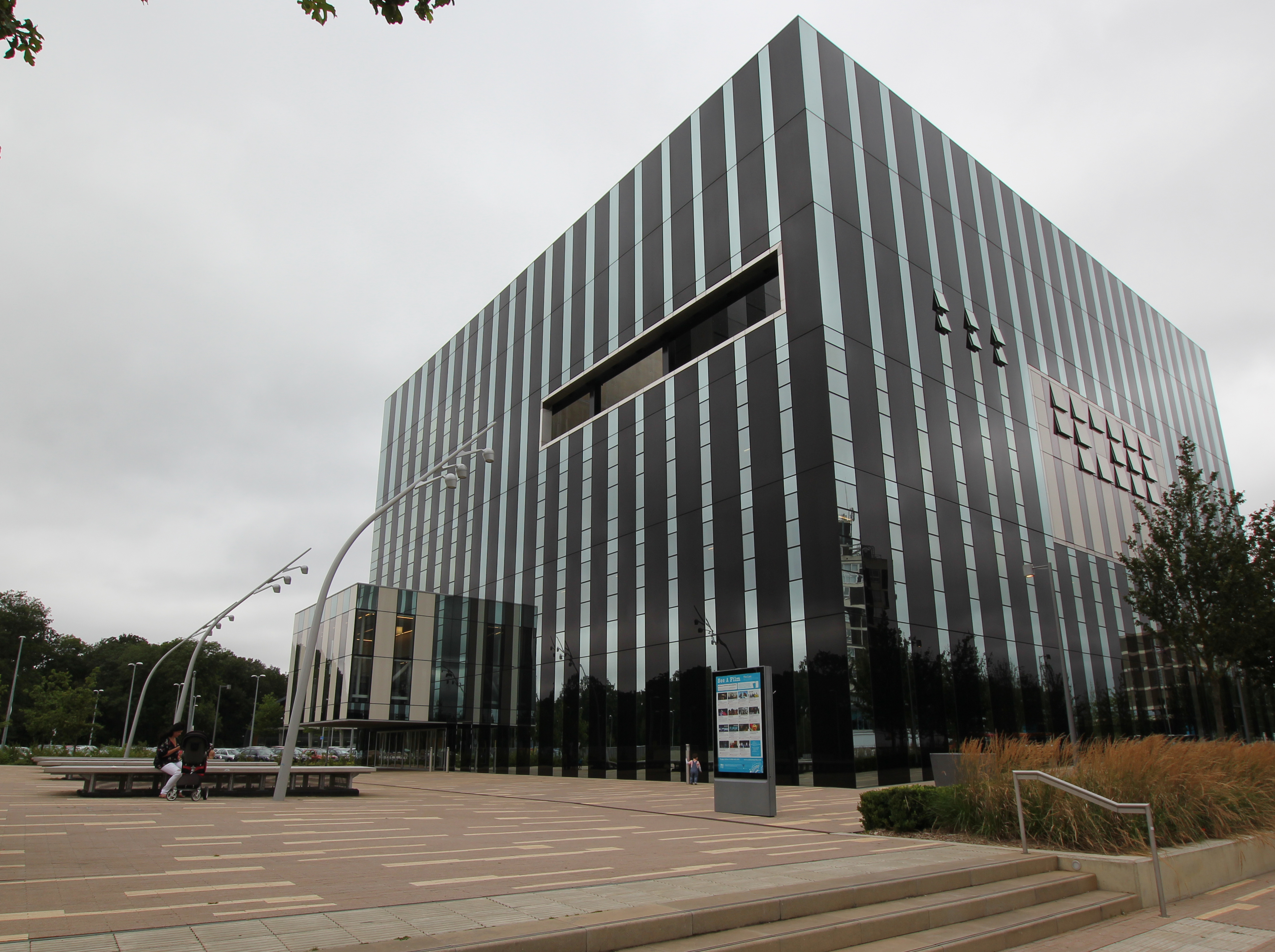
Corby Cube 2012

The Scottish heritage is cherished by many inhabitants. There are Scottish social and sporting clubs and there are many fervent supporters of the Rangers and Celtic football clubs (indeed, Corby was home to the largest Rangers Supporters' Club outside Glasgow and Northern Ireland until its closure in February 2013) as well as the Scottish National Team. Many shops sell Scottish foods and a supermarket even introduced Gaelic signs to their Corby store (but they have since removed them). An annual Highland Gathering featuring traditional Scottish sports, music and dancing is held in the town. Corby had one Church of Scotland congregation, but the final service at St Andrew's took place on Sunday, 26 February 2023. Local legend states that Corby sees the highest sales of the Scottish soft drink Irn-Bru of anywhere outside Scotland. Asda Corby is stated to sell 17 times more Irn-Bru than any other store in England. Its popularity is cemented by the fact that it is available for purchase in all bars, nightclubs and pubs in the area. In 2014, Corby held a mock referendum in the run up to the Scottish independence referendum. 576 votes were cast, with 162 voting for Scottish independence and 414 voting against.

According to the 2001 Census 1.7% of the population are non-white and the average age of the population (37.2) is slightly lower than the average for England and Wales (38.6).

November 2010 saw the opening of the Corby Cube, a major development in the town centre. As well as new council chamber, registrar office, and public library, the Cube is home to a 450-seat theatre and 100 capacity studio theatre. A programme of live theatre, dance, music and stand-up comedy is complemented by a participation programme encouraging all parts of Corby community to get involved. Recently the theatre started screening films, twice a week and including current mainstream releases and the best in world, independent and art house cinema. A report in 2012 revealed that the Cube was built with dangerous design flaws and almost double its original estimated costs and a capacity of only half of what was planned.

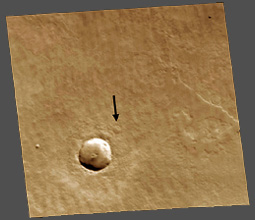
The Corby crater on Mars

A crater on Mars discovered in 1979 was named after Corby, in reference to a famous transcript of a conversation in June 1969 between the crew of the Apollo 11 mission and mission control, whereby world news was relayed to the crew, amongst it was the news that "in Corby, an Irishman named John Coyle won the World's Porridge Eating Championship by consuming 23 bowls of instant oatmeal in 10 minutes". The reply from Apollo 11: "I'd like to enter Aldrin in the porridge eating contest next time; he's on the 19th bowl. Roger."

=== Media ===
Local news and television programmes is provided by BBC East and ITV Anglia. Television signals are received from the Sandy Heath TV transmitter, BBC East Midlands and ITV Central can also be received from the Waltham TV transmitter.

The town's local radio stations are Northants 1 and Northants 2 from NN Media, a local media organisation, providing local information, news and advertising and specialises in providing media training for young people in Northamptonshire, with their studios based in Kettering, broadcasting to the surrounding areas. The town also benefits from Corby Radio on 96.3 FM, a community radio station.

Also serving the town are BBC Radio Northampton on 103.6 FM, Heart East on 96.6 FM, Smooth East Midlands (formerly Connect FM) on 107.4 FM.

Corby's local newspaper is the Northamptonshire Evening Telegraph.

== Sport and leisure ==
Corby is home to Adrenaline Alley which is one of Europe's largest urban sports venues. Members of Team GB have trained there ahead of competing in the Olympic Games.

Corby Town F.C. play home games at Steel Park in the town. As of 2025/26 "The Steelmen" play in the Northern Premier League Division One Midlands.

Other football clubs from Corby field sides in the Northamptonshire Combination Football League. Corby has football, rugby union cricket and bowls clubs which are named after the original owners of the town's former steelworks, Stewarts & Lloyds.

Corby is also home to the Corby East Midlands International Swimming Pool, which opened in 2009, which in turn hosts the town's amateur swimming club.

Corby Athletic Club are based at the Rockingham Triangle Stadium, which was also a former home of Corby Town F.C. The town also has a Tennis Centre and clubs for Table Tennis and various combat sports. A parkrun is held by volunteers on a weekly basis at West Glebe Park.

Public facilities at Lodge Park Sports Centre and Priors Hall Golf Course are overseen by North Northamptonshire Council.

European Le Mans Series LMP2 and LMP3 team Nielsen Racing was based in Corby until 2025.

== Transport ==
=== Roads ===
The town is located along the A43, A427, A6003 and is 6 miles (9.7 km) from the A14 at Kettering. Corby lies within two hours' drive of four international airports: Birmingham, Luton, Stansted and East Midlands. Being a new town, Corby's road network is different from that of older towns. There are several dual carriageways, most of the principal roads have wide reservations and high speed limits and pedestrian crossings over them are often underpasses. However, Corby is only connected by dual carriageway to one neighbouring town, Kettering (the A6003). All other roads into the town are single carriageways. The three dual carriageways form an outer ring road around most of Corby, however it only encircles suburbs south of the town centre and a small amount of countryside.

=== Buses ===
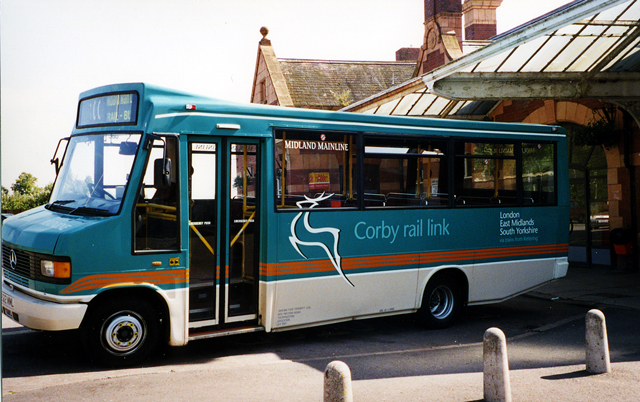
Midland Mainline Corby rail-link bus

Corby is served by six bus routes under the Corby Star brand name. Route X4 connects the town with Peterborough, Oundle, Weldon, Danesholme, Kettering, Isham, Wellingborough, Earls Barton, Northampton, It is also operated by Stagecoach Midlands. National Express coaches also provide long-distance connections to the north and Scotland. Plans to build a new bus station in Corby are being considered by the council following the closure of the old bus station in August 2002.

=== Rail ===
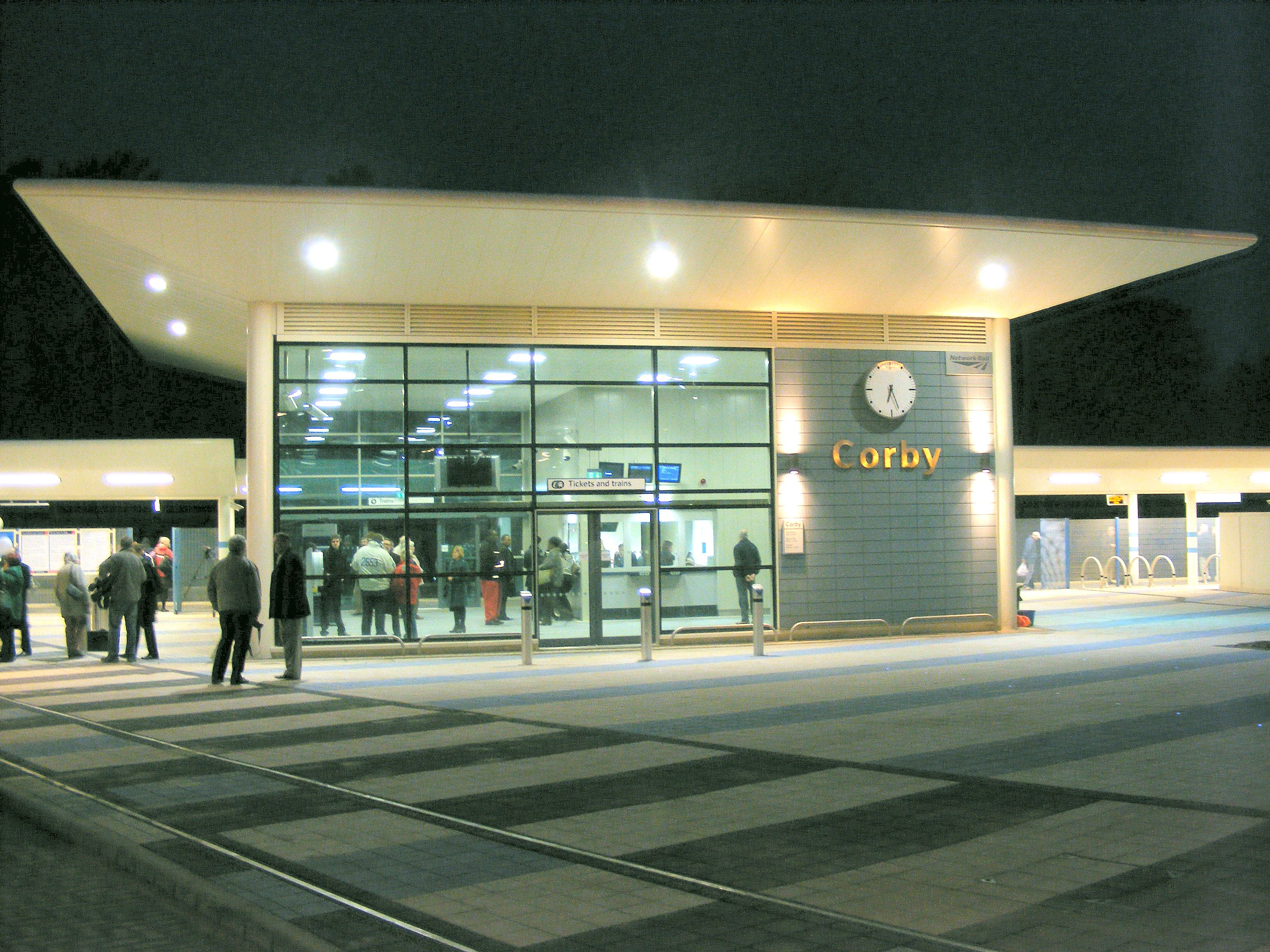
Corby railway station opened on 23 February 2009

Following a number of years when the town had no railway station, a new facility opened on 23 February 2009. East Midlands Railway runs half-hourly services to London St Pancras via Kettering and Wellingborough. The route to London was converted to electric traction in May 2021. There is also a limited peak time service running north to Oakham, Melton Mowbray, East Midlands Parkway and Derby.

== Employment and education ==
=== Employment ===
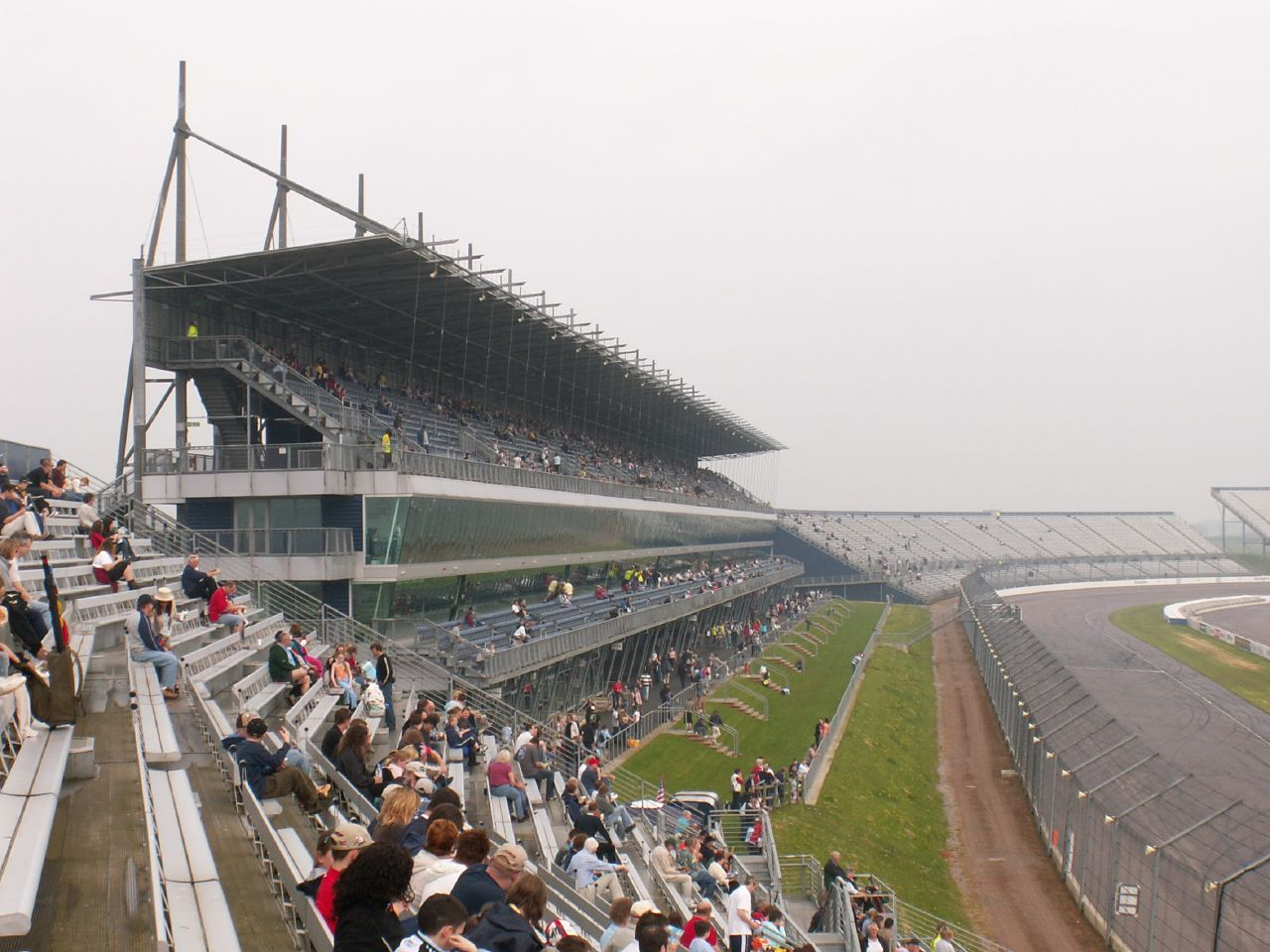
Rockingham Motor Speedway

Since the 1980s the unemployment rate has returned to a level closer to the national average (2.7% in October 2005). Employment is biased towards manufacturing (36.8% compared with a regional average of 18.5%) and against public administration, health and education (10.0% compared with the regional average of 25.9%). Much of industry is concentrated in purpose-built industrial estates on the outskirts of the town. Fairline Boats were manufactured here. Weetabix Limited make Weetos in the north of the town. RS Components are based near Rockingham Speedway. Taste Original (formerly Puredrive), part of Zwanenberg Food Group UK has operated from Corby since 1988 making cooked meat snacking products. Amy's Kitchen has recently opened a factory here, and manufactured products for the UK market here.

2018 research by Sky News identified Corby as the town most threatened by job losses in the UK due to automation with 31% of employment subject to cliff-edge automation.

=== Demography ===
According to the 2001 Census the proportion of the working age population with degree-level qualifications (8.5%) is the lowest of all areas in England and Wales. 39.3% have no GCSE-equivalent qualifications at all. The borough of Corby has the highest rate of teenage pregnancy in the East Midlands, outside of the metropolitan boroughs (unitary authorities), although Lincoln is very similar.

According to the 2011 census, Corby had a population of 61,255 and was 85.0% White British, 9.1% Other White (not including White Irish and Irish Traveller), 1.4% mixed race, 1.4% Asian and 1.7% Black. Corby's least White British ward is Oakley Vale where 70.7% of the population are White British while Corby's least ethnically diverse ward is Rural West, where 95.6% of the population are White British. In 2011, 5567 people registered their ethnicity as 'Other White' or 9.1% of the population. This figure includes a large community of people from Poland and the Baltic States.

=== Schools ===
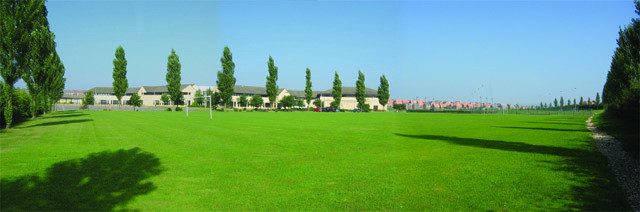
Brooke Weston Academy

The Corby campus of Tresham Institute of Further and Higher Education provides a range of vocational courses for post-16 students and adult learners. The nearest universities are the University of Northampton, 23 mi (37 km) to the south and both the University of Leicester and De Montfort University in Leicester, 25 mi (40 km) to the west.

Brooke Weston Academy, one of fifteen City Technology Colleges in England, opened in 1990. Brooke Weston CTC consistently achieved examination results in the top 5% of English state schools, and has been a City Academy since September 2008.

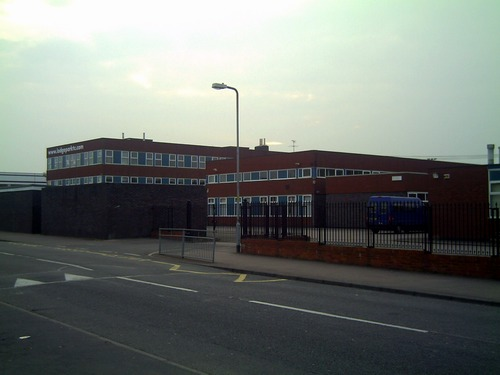
Lodge Park Technology College on Shetland Way

Since 1990 several of Corby's other secondary schools have fared less well with a series of poor examination results and critical inspection reports leading to mergers and closures, the most recent being the closure of Our Lady and Pope John School in 2005. Currently there are five secondary schools in Corby: Brooke Weston Academy, Lodge Park Academy, Corby Business Academy, Kingswood Secondary Academy and Corby Technical School, which opened to students in an old unused primary school in September 2012 with the new building completed and opened in November 2013. Corby Business Academy has a unit for children with severe special educational needs. All four schools have sixth forms for post-16 students.

Corby has 17 primary schools, of which two are Church of England schools, three are Roman Catholic and one for children with severe behavioural and emotional difficulties.

== Regeneration and redevelopment ==
Corby has an Urban Regeneration Company – North Northants Development Company, which now covers the whole of North Northamptonshire rather than just Corby (it was previously known as Catalyst Corby). The company is working with Corby Borough Council, Land Securities (town centre owners), the East Midlands Development Agency and the Homes and Communities Agency to regenerate the town centre as part of the masterplan for the whole town. The population of Corby town is expected to double in the next 30 years through housing on large estates such as Prior's Hall, Little Stanion, Oakley Vale and Great Oakley.

In October 2007 Corby's new shopping precinct, Willow Place, opened. In addition Parkland Gateway, the Borough's £50m investment situated adjacent to Willow Place and including a new Olympic-sized swimming pool and civic hub, was built following its approval in January 2007. Work began on the project in October 2007 and the Corby East Midlands International Pool was officially opened by Olympian Mark Foster in July 2009. Although the Evolution Corby project is currently on hold, limited aesthetic augmentation work within the town centre continues.

"The Saxon Crown", a Wetherspoon pub and hotel in Corby town centre is a refurbished 1960s Cooperative store. Its name refers to the history of the area: the village of Corby derives its name from Kori, a leader of Danish invaders who settled in a clearing in Rockingham Forest.

=== North Londonshire ===
Stephen Fry voiced an advertising campaign in London from 2010 to entice people to move to Corby and the surrounding area including Rushden, Kettering and Wellingborough. The North Northamptonshire Development Corporation's campaign uses newspaper and London Underground advertisements, and also local radio with North Northamptonshire, being dubbed 'North Londonshire', as the area is only an hour from London St Pancras by express rail. The campaign was criticised by residents in the county proud of the Northamptonshire name.

== Toxic waste contamination ==
In July 2009 Corby Borough Council was found liable for negligently exposing pregnant women to toxic waste (dust) during the reclamation of the former British Steel Corporation steelworks, causing birth defects to their children. The judge found in favour of 16 of the 18 claimants, the oldest of whom was 22 at the time of the ruling. The ruling was significant as it was the first in the world to find that airborne pollution could cause such birth defects.

== Geography ==
Corby is 72 miles (116 km) north-northwest of London, 23 miles (37 km) northeast of Northampton, 28 miles (45 km) southeast of Leicester, 51 miles (82 km) east of Birmingham and 19 miles (31 km) west of Peterborough, its nearest city.

The built up area of Corby had a population of 56,810 in 2011 compared with 61,255 for the Borough of Corby. The urban area had an area of 20.5 km2 compared with 80.3 km2 for the larger borough. Corby is expanding rapidly, with the borough having a population of 53,400 in 2001 and increasing to 61,300 in 2011. The expansion has resulted in villages like Great Oakley and Weldon being absorbed into the town's urban area. However, the latter remains a parish, being separated from the rest of Corby by the A43.

=== Areas of Corby ===
Most of Corby's population live in the town itself, however in terms of area it is mostly rural. This list includes the villages within the borough but also districts of the urban area and modern housing developments. The borough of Corby is made up of 11 wards following a boundary change after the 2011 census.

- Weldon
- Danesholme
- Kingswood
- Rockingham
- Corby Old Village
- Gretton
- Exeter
- Cottingham
- Snatchill
- Middleton
- Town Centre
- Oakley Vale
- Great Oakley
- East Carlton
- Hazelwood
- Rowlett
- Willowbrook
- Stanion
- Little Stanion
- Beanfield
- Lodge Park

== Twin towns ==
Corby is twinned with:

- Châtellerault, France
- Velbert, Germany
- Shijiazhuang, China

== Arms ==
Coat of arms of Corby

Notes
Granted to the Urban District Council on 3 March 1958, then the District Council on 30 September 1976, then the Town Council on 17 December 2021.
Crest
On a wreath of the colours a corbie wings elevated Sable beaked membered gorged with a ducal coronet and chained Or its dexter claw resting on a gad of steel Proper.
Escutcheon
Gules a cross patonce cantoning four oak leaves each enfiled by a ducal coronet Or.
Motto
Deeds Not Words

== In popular culture ==
In the BBC radio sitcom Party, the third series is centred on the unnamed party's parliamentary by-election campaign in Corby.

The song Steeltown by Big Country (title track of the album) was written about the town of Corby, telling how many Scots went to work there, but who found themselves unemployed when the steelworks declined. (Source: Melody Maker, 1984)

In February 2025 Netflix released the TV series Toxic Town, based on the Corby toxic waste case that litigated liability in negligence, public nuisance and a breach of statutory duty for reclamation of the Corby Steelworks between 1985 and 1997.

== See also ==
- Grade I listed buildings in Corby
- Grade II* listed buildings in Corby
