= The Ferrers School =

Location
- Queensway; Higham Ferrers, Northamptonshire, NN10 8LF; England; 52.304°N 0.588°W

Information
- Type: Academy
- Established: 1980
- Department for Education URN: 139988 Tables
- Ofsted: Reports
- Headteacher: Clare Raku
- Staff: 135
- Gender: Coeducational
- Age: 11 to 18
- Enrolment: 1097
- Houses: 5
- Colours: Red, Blue, Yellow, Green and purple
- Website: https://www.theferrers.org

The Ferrers School is a coeducational secondary school and sixth form with academy status, located in Higham Ferrers, Northamptonshire, England, UK.

The school was founded in 1980. It previously held specialist status as an Arts College, and changed its name to The Ferrers Specialist Arts College for a time. After converting to academy status in September 2013 the school changed its name to The Ferrers School.

The headteacher is Clare Raku. There were approximately 930 students in Years 7 to 11 on the roll in the 2011–2012 academic year, plus around 160 students in the sixth form, which became independent in September 2023. There are 77 teachers (full-time equivalent) and 54 support staff.

== Feeder School ==
The school admits its Year 7 pupils from Higham Ferrers Junior School and Henry Chichele Primary School, as well as numerous primary schools in Rushden and surrounding villages.

== Sixth form provision ==
The school recently created its own Year 12-13 sixth form, in September 2023.

== Achievement ==
In an Ofsted report in 2015, the school was deemed to be providing a "Good" quality of education in all main areas (Leadership and management, behaviour and safety, quality of teaching, and achievement of pupils). In the same year the school achieved results of 46% of students gaining at least 5 GCSEs at C grade or above including English and Mathematics.

The percentage of students achieving 5+ GCSEs, including maths and English, was as follows:

- 2012: 54%
- 2013: 48%
- 2014: 52%
- 2015: 46%

== Shooting ==
On 6 January 1988, a 16-year-old student of the school, Darren Fowler, entered Ferrers School carrying a 12-gauge double-barrelled shotgun, where he shot and injured 2 teachers and 2 students before being subdued by staff and arrested. Fowler had been expelled in late 1987, and attempted to kill his romantic rival. He was later ordered to be detained for life.
