= Aycliffe =

Aycliffe is part of the name of 5 places in County Durham, England:

- Newton Aycliffe, the oldest new town in the north of England
  - Great Aycliffe, a civil parish
- Aycliffe Village, a village south of Newton Aycliffe
  - Aycliffe railway station
- School Aycliffe, a village west of Newton Aycliffe and east of Heighington
