= Lindisfarne (disambiguation) =

Lindisfarne is a tidal island off Northumberland, England.

Lindisfarne may also refer to:

== Music ==
- Lindisfarne (band), a British folk/rock band
- Lindisfarne (song), a song by James Blake

== Places ==
- Lindisfarne, Tasmania, suburb of Hobart, Tasmania, Australia
- Lindisfarne, Montana, census-designated place in United States

== Schools ==
- Lindisfarne College
- Lindisfarne College, New Zealand
- Lindisfarne Anglican Grammar School

== Other uses ==
- Lindisfarne Castle, a castle on Lindisfarne, Northumberland
- Lindisfarne, a fictional English hedgehog from Kevin & Kell

== See also ==
- Holy Island (disambiguation)
- Lindisfarne Association, a group of intellectuals founded by William Irwin Thompson
- Lindisfarne Gospels, created on Lindisfarne, Northumberland
- Lindisfarne Mead, a fortified drink from the island
- Oscar Murton, Baron Murton of Lindisfarne, (1914–2009), British politician
