= Northern Cross =

Northern Cross may refer to:

- Northern Cross (asterism), an asterism in the constellation Cygnus
- Northern Cross (pilgrimage), an annual pilgrimage in northern England and the England-Scotland border
- Northern Cross, the section of the M50 motorway (Ireland), from Junctions 1 to 6, built in the late 1990s
- Northern Cross Railroad, first railroad in Illinois
- Northern Cross Radio Telescope at the Medicina Radio Observatory
