= Holy Island =

Holy Island or Holy Isle may refer to:

== Places ==
=== United Kingdom ===
==== England ====
- Holy Island, also known as Lindisfarne, Northumberland

==== Scotland ====
- Holy Isle, better known as Eileach an Naoimh, located in the Firth of Lorn
- Holy Island, Firth of Clyde, off the Isle of Arran

==== Wales ====
- Holy Island, Anglesey

=== Ireland ===
- Holy Island, better known as Inis Cealtra, in Lough Derg near Mountshannon, County Clare

=== United States ===
- Holy Island, Massachusetts
- Holy Island (Lake Charlevoix), Michigan

== Other uses ==
- The Holy Island, a 1959 Indian Bengali-language film by Debaki Bose
- Holy Island, 2015 novel by LJ Ross
