= Ann Hamilton (actress) =

British dancer and actress

- Born: 5 July 1939 (age 86); Orsett, Essex, England
- Other name: Annie Clayton
- Occupations: Dancer, actress, dog trainer
- Years active: 1957-present
- Known for: The Morecambe & Wise Show
- Spouse: Tony Clayton
- Children: Michael Clayton (b. 1961)

Ann Hamilton (born 5 July 1939) is an English actress, best known for her numerous appearances with the comedians Morecambe & Wise.

== Biography ==
Hamilton was born in Orsett, Essex. She began dance classes at the age of three, and attended ballet school. Her first job, at 18, was as a dancer at the Windmill Theatre.

She married the theatre director Tony Clayton in 1959, and moved into stage acting, appearing in How to Succeed in Business Without Really Trying in the West End in 1963, and Wind In The Sassafras Trees five years later. She also worked with the comics Roy Hudd, Ken Dodd, and Bruce Forsyth — whose writers Dick Hills and Sid Green recommended her to Morecambe & Wise.

Hamilton first appeared in their ATV show Two of a Kind in 1966, and became a regular cast member. When Morecambe & Wise moved to the BBC in 1968 for The Morecambe & Wise Show, Hamilton went with them. She appeared with them more than 100 times, prompting Eric Morecambe to refer to her as "our Margaret Dumont".

She appeared in The Avengers 1967 episode entitled The Positive Negative Man.

Hamilton retired from show-business in 1987 to work as a dog trainer and canine behaviourist. She has been a judge at Crufts, and appeared on TV as the presenter of Bring Your Husband To Heel (2005), and as a judge on The Underdog Show (2007).
