= Newton Aycliffe =

Town in County Durham, England

Coordinates: 54.62°N 1.58°W

- Town
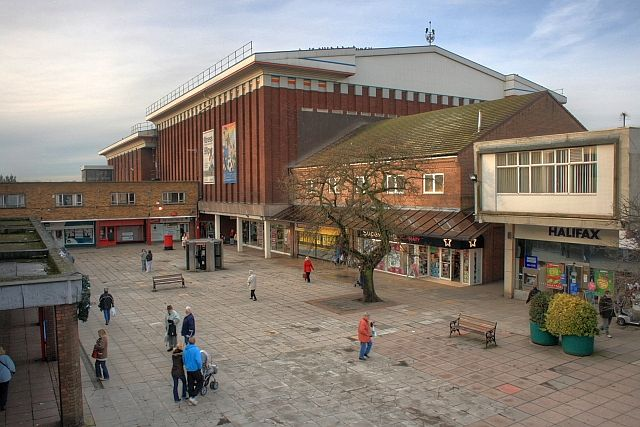
- The town centre

- Location within County Durham
- Population: 26,415 (2021)
- OS grid reference: NZ2724
- Civil parish: Great Aycliffe
- Unitary authority: County Durham
- Ceremonial county: County Durham
- Region: North East
- Country: England
- Sovereign state: United Kingdom
- Areas of the town: List: Aycliffe Village; School Aycliffe; Woodham
- Post town: NEWTON AYCLIFFE
- Postcode district: DL5
- Dialling code: 01325
- Police: Durham
- Fire: County Durham and Darlington
- Ambulance: North East
- UK Parliament: Newton Aycliffe and Spennymoor

Newton Aycliffe is a town in County Durham, England. Founded in 1947 under the New Towns Act of 1946, the town is 5 miles (8.0 km) to the north of Darlington and 10 miles (16 km) to the south of Durham. It is the oldest new town in the north of England. Together with the bordering Aycliffe Village (to the south) and the north part of School Aycliffe (to the west), it forms the civil parish of Great Aycliffe. The population of the town at the time of the 2021 census was 26,415.

== History ==
=== Anglo-Saxons ===
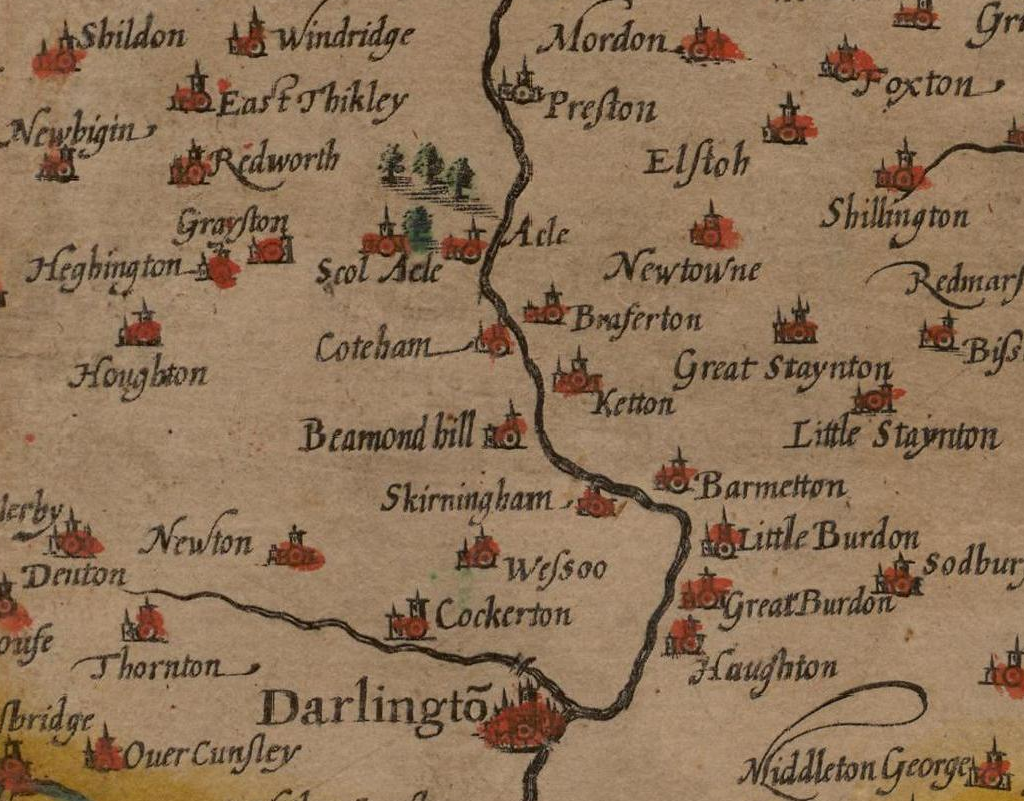
A map of Aycliffe and its surrounding area c. 1611, extracted from a map of County Durham by John Speed. The name "Aycliffe" is rendered as "Acle". In the above, "Acle" is the original village of Aycliffe, and "Scol Acle" is School Aycliffe ("School" in the village's name being derived from "Scula", a Viking chieftain that was granted lands in the area). The location of Newton Aycliffe is shown on the map as a forested area to the north of these two villages. (Click here for the entire map)

Prior to the Newtown development, Aycliffe (originally 'Acley') was the site of an Anglo-Saxon settlement. The name Acley came from the Old English words: 'Ac', meaning oak, and 'ley', meaning 'a clearing'. Aycliffe was the location of a church synods in AD 782 and AD 789. Another old name was 'Yacley'. The town's motto is Latin for "Not the Least, but the Greatest we seek".

=== Transport ===
On the edge of the town is the Bishop Auckland to Darlington railway branch line which is part of the 1825 Stockton and Darlington Railway. George Stephenson's steam locomotive Locomotion No 1 was placed on the rails close to Newton Aycliffe near to where Heighington station is.

The Great North Road (A1) passed through the town until 1969.

=== World War II ===
During World War II, Aycliffe was the site of ammunitions manufacturing. Huge grass-covered munitions factories were built and served by the nearby railway lines. The factories were largely staffed by thousands of women, dubbed the "Aycliffe Angels", who bravely took up the dangerous work.

=== Beveridge Report ===
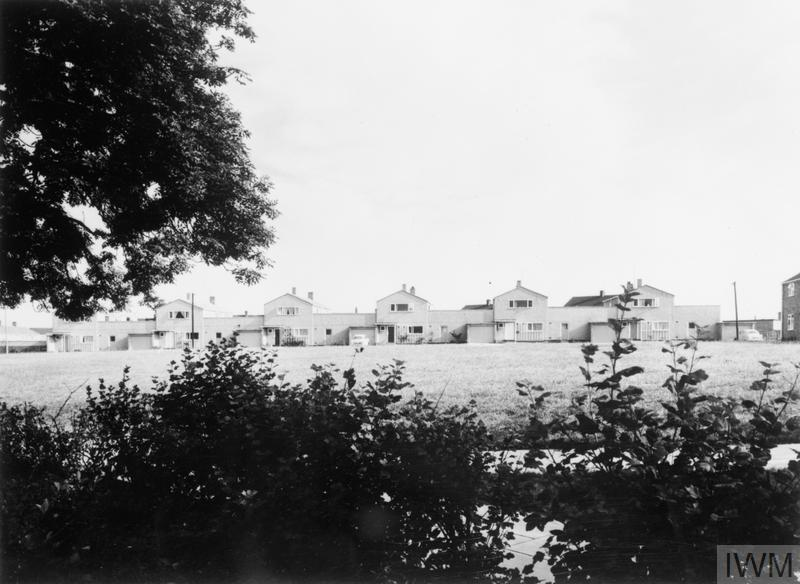
Newton Aycliffe during its construction as a new town

The government asked William Beveridge to produce a report on what he wanted Britain to be like after the war. In 1942 he produced his report. Five giants, he said, oppressed mankind – Poverty, Disease, Homelessness, Ignorance and Unemployment. To end this once and for all, Beveridge proposed a state system of Social Security benefits, a National Health Service, council housing, free education and full employment. He called it the Welfare State. The Welfare State was introduced across Britain in 1948. Beveridge selected an area of moorland which lay between Aycliffe and Middridge to be developed into what would become his flagship "new-town". Newton Aycliffe was intended to be the very embodiment of his vision for postwar Britain. Beveridge, committed as he was to his vision for the emerging social landscape of postwar Britain, also took up residence in the Pease Way area of his flagship new town.

=== Industry ===
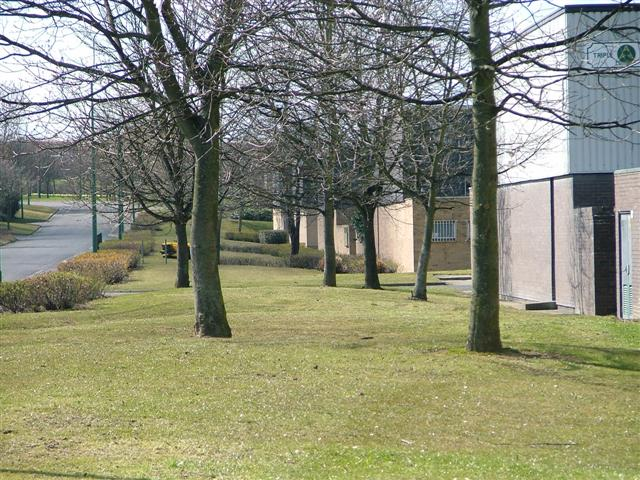
Newton Aycliffe Industrial Estate.

The factories were eventually replaced by manufacturing buildings which over time became the industrial district of the town. After the war, many companies moved onto the industrial estate, including Great Lakes Chemicals, which retained the munitions factories until 2004 when it was closed and demolished, along with numerous factories. There were also Eaton Axles, and B.I.P., who were to become two of the largest employers of the town until the early 1980s. One other company was Union Carbide. Eaton Axles closed down and shipped itself to Poland; B.I.P. is now Hydro Polymers; meanwhile, Union Carbide was taken over by STC (Standard Telephone and Cables) before being taken over by Sanyo for several years, but this has now closed. Businesses currently located in the town include Flymo, 3M, Ebac and Ineos (who have taken over Hydro Polymers) with many more small factory units. One of the largest factories in the district is Gestamp Tallent (Formerly Thyssenkrupp), which now holds 7 plants around the industrial estate. In 2015, Hitachi commenced production at their £82 million railway rolling stock factory at Newton Aycliffe, called Hitachi Newton Aycliffe. It employs 720 people.

== Governance ==
Great Aycliffe Town Council
- The parish coat of arms, registered in October 1956

Type
- Type: Town Council

Leadership
- Mayor (2026–incumbent): Neil Collinson
- Town clerk: Dan Austin
- Member of Parliament (MP) for Newton Aycliffe and Spennymoor: Alan Strickland (labour)

Structure
- Seats: 30
- Independent: 19 / 30
- Liberal Democrats: 9 / 30
- Labour: 1 / 30
- Reform: 1 / 30

Website
- great-aycliffe.gov.uk

Great Aycliffe was once part of a wider ancient parish of Aycliffe which included Brafferton, Newton-Ketton and Preston-le-Skerne.

From 1974 until 2009, Great Aycliffe was in the borough of Sedgefield, and it was the largest town in the borough. Since April 2009, Newton Aycliffe has been governed by the Great Aycliffe Town Council and the County Durham Unitary Authority.

== Geography ==
At the 2001 census, Great Aycliffe had a population of 26,385, although in 2007 Great Aycliffe Town Council reported this had risen to 29,000. It is the largest town within the Sedgefield constituency. Within a radius of 10 miles (16 km) are several towns and villages including Darlington, Bishop Auckland, Shildon and Heighington. To the south of the town is the village of Aycliffe. Newton comes from 'New Town'.

Aycliffe Village is near to the A1(M) junction with the A167 (former A1).

=== Woodham ===
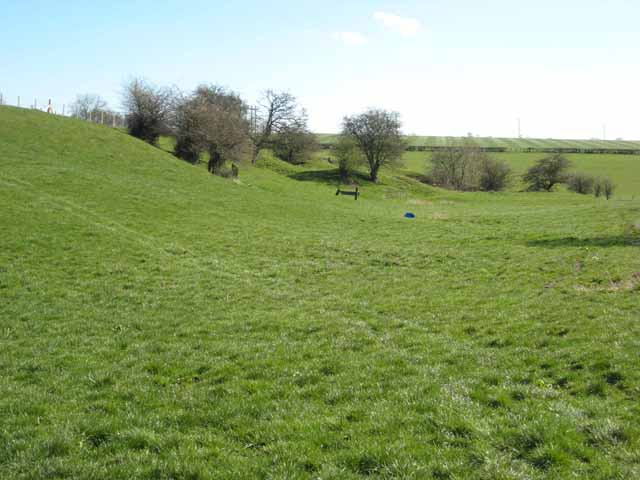
Remains of the medieval village of Woodham

The original Woodham was a medieval village, although apart from a few low mound earthworks (on private land) there is no trace of this original village. It was located on the northern side of the Woodham Burn stream and to the East of the A167 that cuts through the site in a north–south direction. The village itself was said to have been 'burned by the Scots' during the English – Scottish wars of the late 13th and early 14th centuries, and appears not to have been rebuilt, although several buildings did appear in the 18th and 19th centuries, some of which still remain on both east and west sides of the A167. There appears to have been a small 18th-century stone quarry on the eastern side of this site with associated buildings, which can be seen on the original 1860 Ordnance Survey maps, however most of these buildings were demolished towards the end of the 19th century.

Afterwards the hamlet of Woodham remained relatively unchanged until the late 1970s – early 1980s, when some of its farms, such as Woodham North, Woodham South and the original Woodham Farm itself, were all demolished and their land used for new housing developments, as nearby Newton Aycliffe expanded and began to encroach on the original Woodham area.

Newton Aycliffe, in common with many of the post war "New Towns" consisted originally of mostly social / public housing, a large proportion of which is now privately owned. Woodham is the largest of a number of private housing developments that have taken place since the late 1970s, to the North of Woodham Burn; which at one time formed a natural northern boundary to the town of Newton Aycliffe.

From its start Newton Aycliffe kept expanding in size, until 1980 when the council stopped building council homes. Since then private houses and housing associations have been building the town's homes. In the early 1980s an area of private housing called Woodham Village was built on the site of what was once Woodham Farm, it was designed and developed around a community centre, church and a parade of shops overlooking a central green. The Huntsman Public house is also situated on the same central green, whilst the Woodham Golf and Country Club lies a short way to the north of the main development, on the road to Rushyford.

Woodham Way is the centre of Woodham containing a row of shops including dentists, takeaways and newsagents. Woodham lies close to the town centre and the local supermarket, both within walking distance.

Recently the area has been expanded by more housing developments increasing the size of the village by a notable amount.

== Economy ==
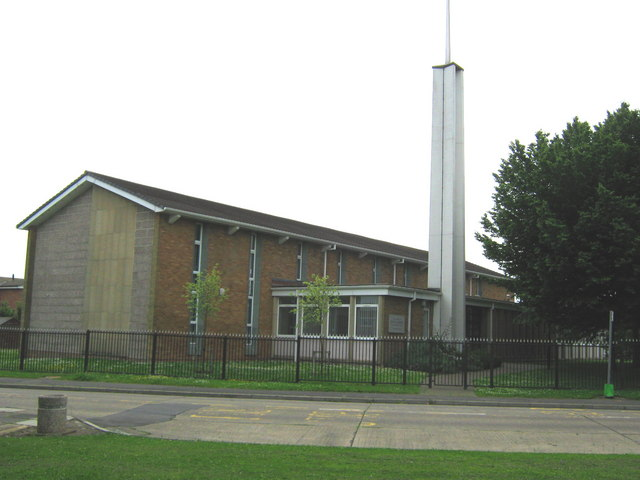
Church of Jesus Christ of Latter-Day Saints

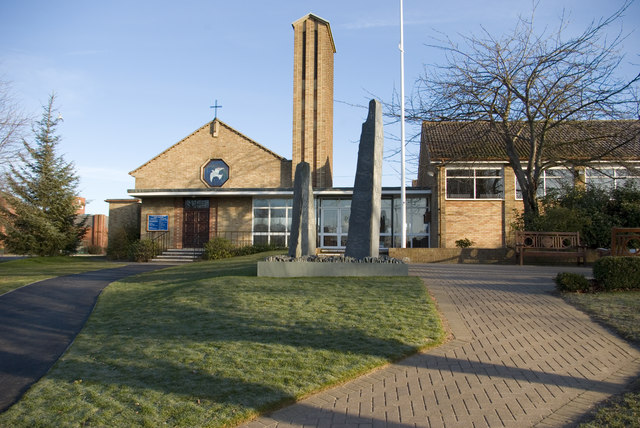
St. Clare's Church

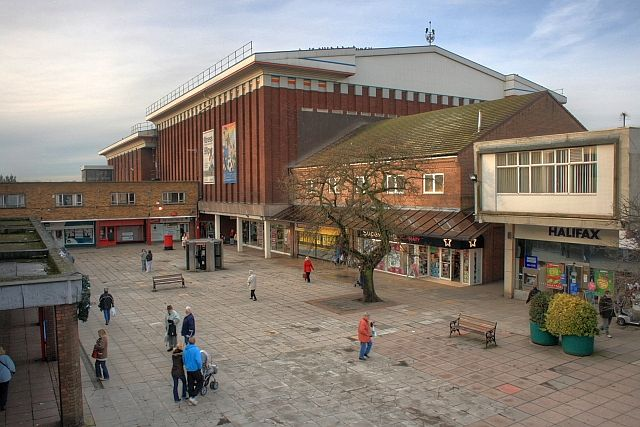
Newton Aycliffe town centre in 2008.

The town has a large industrial estate to the south of the town, split into three.

- On the Heighington Lane Business Park, Lidl have a main distribution centre on Millennium Way, and with RF Micro Devices, are to the south of the estate. The RFMD plant was formerly a DRAM factory for Fujitsu until 1999, when bought by Filtronic, who then sold their semiconductor business to RFMD in 2007. The plant uses pHEMT technologies (High-electron-mobility transistor), using Gallium arsenide (GaAs) and Gallium nitride (GaN). The plant makes electronic wafers.
- Aycliffe Industrial Estate
- Aycliffe Industrial Park (nearest to the town)

The Ineos plant (former Hydro Polymers PVC plant) is near the railway.

== Education ==
Schools in the area are

- Aycliffe School – North East Centre for Autism – Website
- Aycliffe Village Primary School – Website in nearby Aycliffe Village
- Byerley Park Primary School – Website
- Greenfield Academy – Website# (Formely Greenfield Community College)
- St Francis Horndale Church of England Primary School
- St Joseph's Roman Catholic Voluntary Aided Primary School
- St Mary's Roman Catholic Voluntary Aided Primary School – Website
- UTC South Durham (Years 10-11) –
- Stephenson Way Community Primary School – Website
- Sugar Hill Primary School
- Vane Road Primary School – Website
- Woodham Burn Primary School – Website
- Walworth School Blue bell Way
- Woodham Academy – Website
- Milton and Marlow Hall's were two adjacent secondary schools which originally served the town. They merged in 1971 to create the Avenue Comprehensive. The Avenue was closed in 1992. It was later demolished and the area stood as wasteland for around ten years. The site is now occupied by a Tesco Extra.

Colleges in the area are

- Thornbeck College – Website
- Bishop Auckland College – Website
- Queen Elizabeth Sixth Form College – Website
- Darlington College – Website
- New College Durham – Website
- Durham Sixth Form Centre – Website
- UTC South Durham (Sixth Form) – Website

== Media ==
Local news and television signals are provided by BBC North East and Cumbria and ITV Tyne Tees. Television signals are received from either the Bilsdale or Pontop Pike TV transmitters.

Local radio stations are BBC Radio Tees, Capital North East, Heart North East, Smooth North East, Greatest Hits Radio North East, Nation Radio North East, Hits Radio Teesside and Aycliffe Radio, a community-based station which broadcasts from the town.

The town is served by the local newspapers The Northern Echo and Aycliffe Today, as well as the Newton News, which is the town's local community magazine.

== Transport ==
=== Railway ===
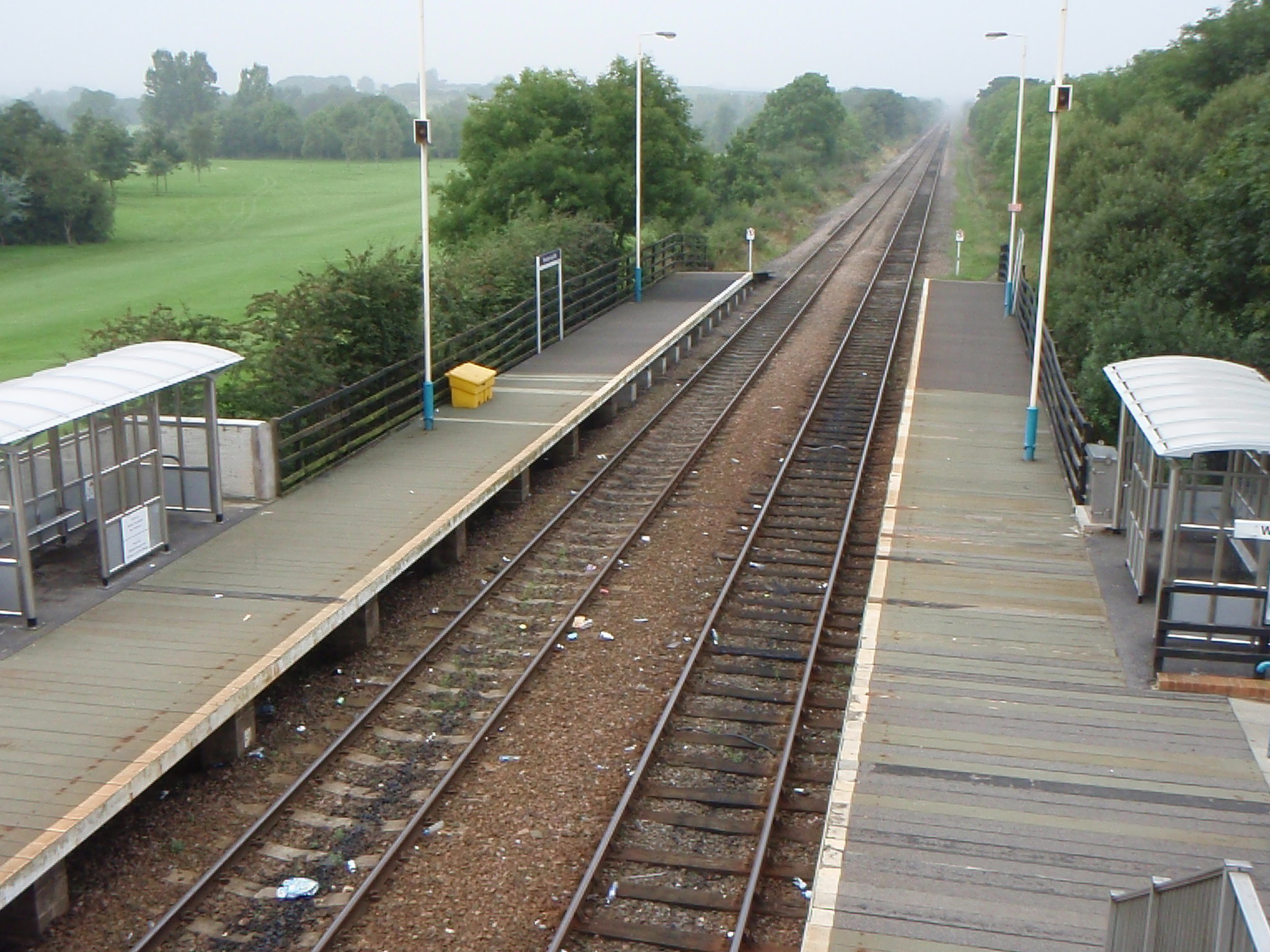
Newton Aycliffe station

Newton Aycliffe railway station is a stop on the Tees Valley Line. Services are provided by Northern Trains to Bishop Auckland, Darlington and Saltburn.

There are connections to London North Eastern Railway services on the East Coast Main Line at Darlington to Edinburgh Waverley and London Kings Cross; at Eaglescliffe for Grand Central services to Northallerton and York; and at Thornaby for Northern Trains services to Hartlepool, Sunderland and Newcastle.

=== Roads ===
The A167, formerly a section of the A1, is the main road to the town; it runs to Durham and Newcastle upon Tyne (30 miles) in the north and Darlington (8 miles) and Northallerton in the south.

The A1(M), which runs between Edinburgh and London, passes near to the town; it provides as an alternative route to Durham and Newcastle. The A689 is also nearby; it runs to Bishop Auckland in the west and Hartlepool and Teesside in the east.

=== Buses ===
The town has bus services provided by Arriva North East to Bishop Auckland, Durham, Darlington, Spennymoor and Ferryhill, Town services are provided by Hodgsons' service 17.

== Healthcare ==
There is one nearby Accident and Emergency department in the area – Darlington Memorial Hospital. The hospital is equipped for dealing with chest pain, shortness of breath, headaches, convulsions, diabetes and general ill health and will liaise with the regional psychiatric teams in the event of mental health cases or for referral to the West Park Mental Health Hospital. Mental Health teams operate from the Pioneering Care Centre also in the case of Child and Adolescent Mental to the new centre in Burn Lane. Darlington is well equipped for injuries such as broken bones, severe abdominal pain which may require surgery, eye conditions and maternity and baby cases. For cancer treatments a visit many miles away to the James Cook University Hospital in Middlesbrough is required. There are several care homes in the area such as Woodham Grange and Woodham Lodge, both of which are situated on Burn Lane.

== Notable people ==
- Ross Turnbull, former goalkeeper
- Scott Mann, film director
- George Courtney, football referee
- Jason Steele, goalkeeper
- Lewis Wing, footballer
- Danny Hooper, footballer
- Brian Atkinson, former professional footballer & manager
- Danny Mellanby, former footballer
- David Bryan, lead singer for Hotel FM
- Mark Gatiss, actor, comedian, screenwriter and novelist
- Paul Magrs writer of Doctor Who
- Vic Reeves, comedian, artist, actor and television presenter
- Harold Shipman, serial killer, lived here 1976–1978
- Howard Martin, general practitioner acquitted for murder
- Kate Avery, long-distance runner
- Darren Craddock, former footballer
- Paul Howell, MP
