= Ebac =

British company

Ebac Ltd.
- Company type: Private
- Founded: 1973; 53 years ago
- Founder: John Elliott
- Headquarters: Newton Aycliffe, County Durham, England
- Key people: Pamela Petty (managing director); John Elliott (chairman)
- Products: Dehumidifiers, water coolers, air source heat pumps, freezers, washing machines
- Revenue: ▲£17,775,135 (2019)
- Operating income: ▼£1,284,747 (2019)
- Net income: ▲£632,892 (2019)
- Number of employees: ▲226 (2019)
- Parent: Ebac Group Ltd
- Website: ebac.com

Ebac Ltd. is a family-owned British company which designs and manufactures dehumidifiers, water coolers, air source heat pumps, freezers and washing machines.

== Company history ==
In 1972, John Elliott took an order from Bovis Homes to build industrial dehumidifiers suited to the UK climate. That order led to Ebac's foundation in 1973, with Elliott as the sole member of staff. The company grew and seven years later it reached its first million pound turnover. In 1980, Ebac developed the UK's first mass-produced domestic dehumidifier. Ebac moved into the water cooler market in 1993.

In 2005, Ebac moved into the leisure industry by opening its first city centre luxury day spa for ladies. The spa was situated in Brewery Wharf, Leeds, and its aim was to combine luxury, pampering, beauty and indulgence in a convenient city centre location. Waterfall Spa also developed its own range of spa retail products. The spa could accommodate up to 30 guests per day and the facilities included six treatment rooms, relaxation boudoir, hydrotherapy pool, tropicarium, aromatherapy steam room, rasul mud chamber, manicure and pedicure area and café. In 2008, a local newspaper (The Yorkshire Post) reported that a number of celebrities often frequented the spa. However in 2010 it ceased trading.

A range of refrigerators and freezers was introduced in 2008, but were discontinued a few years later due to being imported and merely badged as Ebac.

In 2011, Ebac began to develop a range of air source heat pumps, but again were discontinued some years later. However, in 2023 Ebac revived its heat pump technology due to heat pumps becoming more popular. In 2011 ownership of Ebac was transferred to a trust which restricts the sale or breakup of the company and requires the reinvestment of all profits.

In 2013, Ebac purchased the assets of the collapsed Scotland-based company Icetech Freezers, including its Norfrost brand. In 2014 it began production of Norfrost branded freezers at its own factory, but by early 2016 Ebac once again ceased production of the chest freezers. This was believed to be due to poor management and inferior packaging of the product and shipment method.

Ebac started production of washing machines in 2016. It became the first manufacturer of washing machines in the UK since the closure of the Hotpoint/Indesit factory in Denbighshire in 2009. The project was assisted by a government grant received in 2013 and was expected to create 200 jobs, but to date Ebac has never achieved its 200 job promise. Ebac washing machines are only sold in the UK.

== John Elliott ==
John Elliott was born in Bishop Auckland and trained as an engineer. His father was a baker who died when Elliott was six months old. Elliot grew up in High Lands, a Durham pit village near Cockfield.

In 2004, Elliott became Chairman of the "North East Says No" campaign which was set up to stop Deputy Prime Minister John Prescott's plans for a regional assembly. The campaign was a huge success with 78% of voters saying no. Elliot has since made a number of TV appearances including Channel 4's The Secret Millionaire and the first episode of the BBC comedy documentary Bring Your Husband To Heel.

In January 2025, Elliott told a Reform UK rally that people who voted Remain in the Brexit referendum "shouldn't be allowed to vote".
