= Woodham Golf and Country Club =

Coordinates: 54.64046°N 1.5744°W

- Interactive map of Woodham Golf and Country Club

Club information
- Location: Newton Aycliffe, County Durham, England, United Kingdom
- Established: 1981
- Tota holes: 18
- Website: Official website
- Designed by: James Hamilton-Stutt
- Par: 73
- Length: 6771 yards

Woodham Golf and Country Club (formerly known as Rushyford Golf Club) is a golf club in Newton Aycliffe, County Durham, England. The course, set over 229 acres (0.93 km^{2}) of parkland, opened in 1981, and was designed by James Hamilton-Stutt. The club's head professional is Ernie Wilson. Which was in administration but now been bought by Hall Construction Services and is now open. Woodham Golf Club Honours:

- - Lee McCavanagh - Durham County Matchplay Champion 2010, Durham County 30+Caps, England Schoolboys U18s
- - Tony Stafford - England University 3 Caps v Wales, Scotland and Ireland, North Durham Union Champion 2002, Durham County U21 Captain, Durham County 8 Caps.
- - David Burnham - Durham County 5 Caps
