= Aycliffe Village =

Village in County Durham, England

Coordinates: 54.5972°N 1.5648°W

- Location within County Durham
- OS grid reference: NZ 2822 2253
- Unitary authority: County Durham
- Ceremonial county: County Durham
- Region: North East
- Country: England
- Sovereign state: United Kingdom
- Police: Durham
- Fire: County Durham and Darlington
- Ambulance: North East

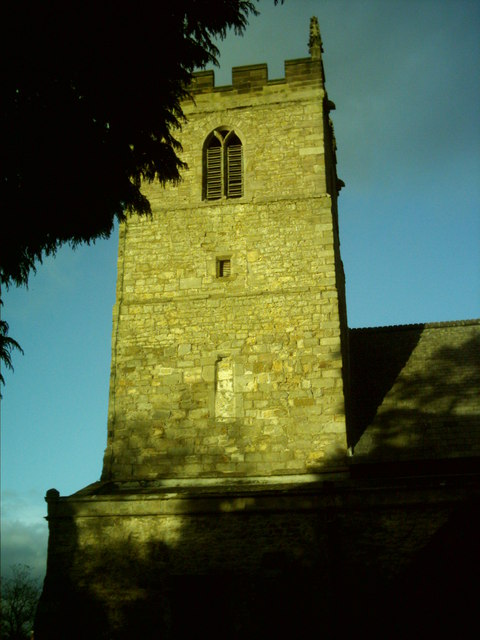
The church tower in Aycliffe Village

Aycliffe Village is a village in County Durham, in England. It is situated immediately to the south of the town of Newton Aycliffe.

== History ==
=== Industrial Estate ===
The industrial estate features many buildings dating back to World War II. One building, which now goes by the name of ROF 59, was originally a factory where bombs were made, and many of the original WW2 memorabilia can be seen within the building.

=== Church ===
St Andrews Church in Aycliffe Village dates back to Saxon times and Church Synods were held there in AD 782 and AD 789. The church is over 1200 years old and was dedicated originally to Saint Acca, chaplain to Saint Wilfred. Some time after his death, a church dedicated to Saint Acca was built here in AD 740, before the dedication was transferred to the current church when it was built in the 10th century. In the church are many stones, thought to date back as far as the 9th and 11th centuries, as well as many medieval stones also. Furthermore, 2 pre-conquest crosses were discovered at the church. The cross titled as “Details of the Crucifixion of our Lord Scene” features a centaur-like creature with a horse's body, head and legs. It is believed that this cross may have some Viking influence. The North aisle of the church was added in the late 12th century and was built by piercing through the old Saxon walls and extending the nave roughly 12 feet to the west. The South aisle of the church was added in the early 13th century using the same technique of piercing through the old Saxon walls, however this resulted in it having oddly shaped arches. The South aisle features a chantry chapel. In the North West corner of the church there is a grave cover, believed to belong to priest, John De Akeley, Rector of Great Stanton and Archdeacon 1311 – 16 (a member of the local Amendeville family). This grave cover is located close to the effigy of a knight dressed in chainmail. The knight is believed to be Sir Thomas de Amundeville de Whitton, Seneschal to Bishop Stickell and Lord of Woodham and Whitworth who died around the year 1305. In the South West corner of the chancel lies another grave cover, of a blacksmith and his wife, believed to be from the early 14th century. The Jacobean pews in the nave and pulpit are crafted of oak and were created around the year 1630. The tower seen on the church was believed to be built in the early 13th century, at the same time as the South Aisle. The tower was originally topped with a wooden spire, though it has been reported as missing as early in the 15th century. The cause is unknown though is thought to be a fire. In its place, a 4th storey was built, to accommodate bells. Henry VIII’s Commissioners found “two bells in the steeple”. These were later removed when Aycliffe was occupied by Cromwell's troop. Two of the bells now in the tower were made in 1664 and the third in 1869. In 1881 & 1882, a major restoration project took place, involving removing the plaster from the walls, restoring the nave and chancel roofs, renewing the aisle roof, adding the organ chamber and adding the vestry.

=== Naming ===
Prior to the foundation of Newton Aycliffe in 1948, the village was just known as "Aycliffe", "Village" being added to distinguish it from the new town.

=== Features ===
The village features a church, a primary school, a hair salon and two local pubs; The County and The Royal Telegraph.

== More Information ==
A half mile walk to the West through part of the adjacent industrial estate will bring you to the Locomotion One, which went up for sale in 2017 before eventually shutting down. It is located on the line of the original Stockton and Darlington Railway.

== Current ==
Today's Aycliffe Village is a mixture of cottages, old houses and new builds. On the whole, its architecture is varied with some houses dating back several hundred years to a small amount of relatively new-build properties. Although, unfortunately the village is cut by a main A class road, the A167. The variously aged developments all form a unified village community. The village also features a large industrial estate, which connects the village to nearby town Newton Aycliffe. Many large companies and factories have sites on this industrial estate, including 3M, Ebac, Gestamp and Husqvarna
