= Lindisfarne National Nature Reserve =

Nature reserve in Northnumberland, England

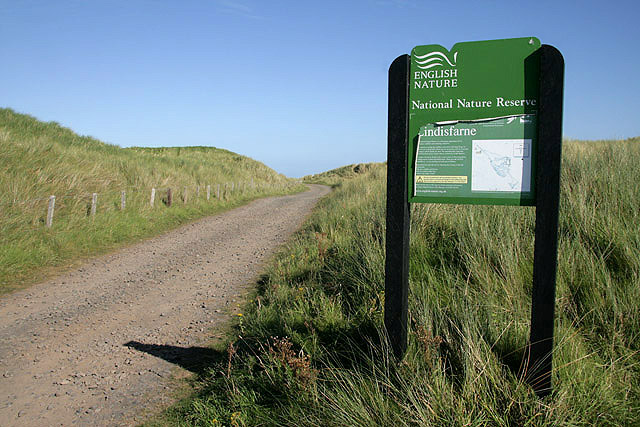

- Location within England
- Location: Northumberland, England
- Coordinates: 55°40′37″N 1°47′42″W
- Area: 3,541 hectares (8,750 acres)
- Website: Natural England website

Lindisfarne National Nature Reserve is a 3,541-hectare (8,750-acre) UK national nature reserve. It was founded to help safeguard the internationally important wintering bird populations, and six internationally important species of wildfowl and wading birds winter here. For the pale-bellied brent geese from Svalbard, this is their only regular wintering place in all of the United Kingdom. Pinkfooted and greylag geese, wigeons, grey plovers and bar-tailed godwits are the other visitors.

Lindisfarne National Nature Reserve is a Ramsar site, and as a result is a wetland of international significance.

== Habitats ==
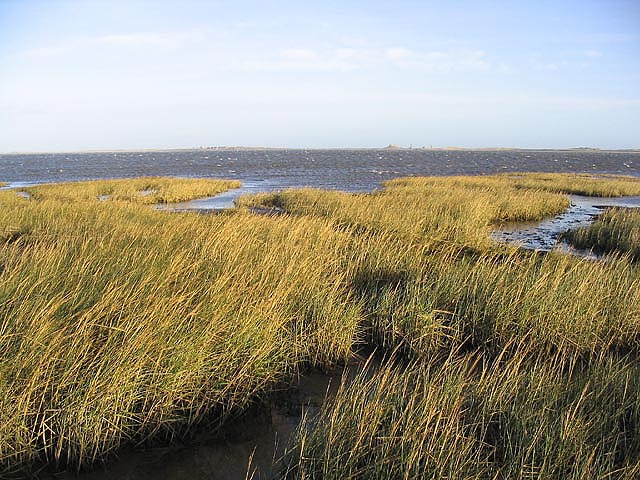
The reserve's mudflats are a refuge for waterfowl

Lindisfarne National Nature Reserve covers a stretch of coastline, including the dunes of Lindisfarne (Holy Island) and other coastal areas, such as intertidal mudflats, rocky shore, sand dunes and salt marshes. The dunes support many plants. Early forget-me-nots and marram grass are present. The reserve has many species of insects, moths and butterflies, including the 'woolly bears' (tiger moth caterpillars), and dark green fritillary and grayling butterflies. Big brown-lipped snails can also be found. During early summer, the purple northern marsh orchid flourishes along with the early marsh orchid. In July the marsh helleborines flower and form spectacular white carpets. An orchid, the Lindisfarne helleborine, has been discovered on the island. The plants were formerly identified as dune helleborine (Epipactis dunensis), but DNA analysis carried out in 2003 revealed them to be genetically distinct, and the new species was given the scientific name Epipactis sancta.

== Birds ==
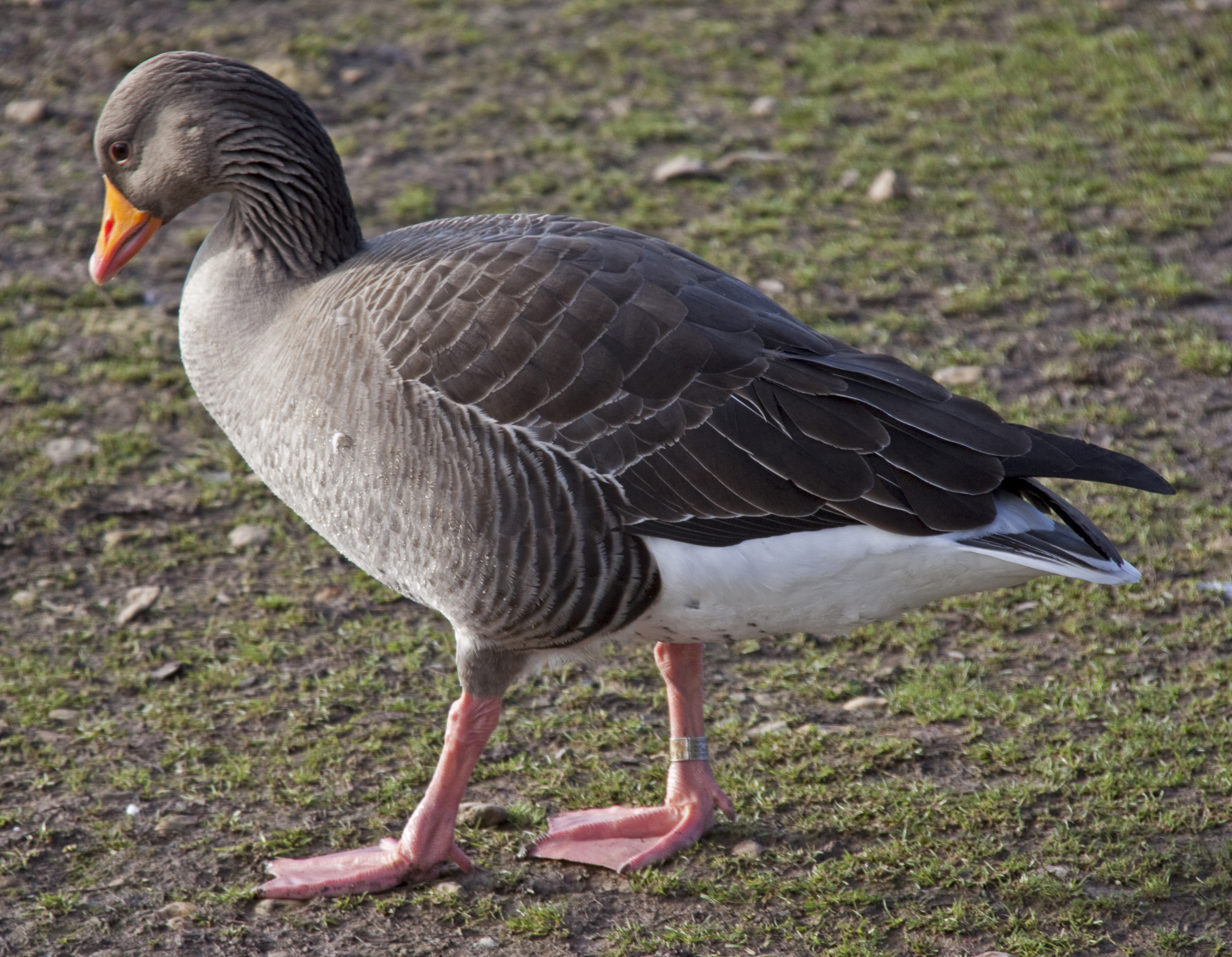
Greylag goose

Bird species for which the Lindisfarne National Nature Reserve is important include pale-bellied brent goose, wigeon, teal, pintail, merlin, dunlin, bar-tailed godwit and many others. It is a good place for observing migrating birds arriving from the east, including large numbers of redwing and fieldfare, and also scarcer Siberian birds including regular annual yellow-browed warblers. Rare species such as Radde's warbler, dusky warbler and red-flanked bluetail have all been seen on Lindisfarne. As of 2016, 330 species have been recorded on Lindisfarne and the adjacent Lindisfarne National Nature Reserve. The large number and variety of birds makes the area popular with bird watchers, particularly in the autumn and winter.

Common throughout Lindisfarne and the Farne Islands are the common eider duck. Saint Cuthbert was reputed to be fond of them (as pets, not food) during his periods on the Farnes as a hermit. In 676 he promulgated a law protecting the birds, reputed to be the first bird protection legislation. Locally the birds are known as "Cuddy's ducks" (occasionally "Cuddy's hens") after the familiar form of "Cuthbert".

== Seals ==
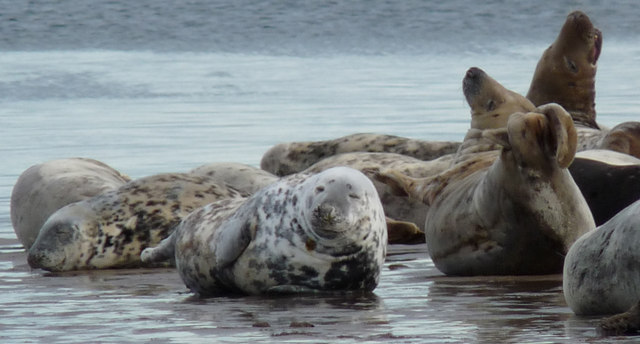
Grey seals

Grey seals are commonly found in the waters and on the rocks around the isle of Lindisfarne, and common seals are also occasionally seen.

== Location ==
Lindisfarne National Nature Reserve is located on the North Northumberland coastline, about 10 miles (16 km) south of Berwick-upon-Tweed. Lindisfarne is signposted from the A1 highway south of Berwick-upon-Tweed. There are car parks available on the isle of Lindisfarne (Holy Island), at Budle Bay, and at Beal, on the mainland.

=== The causeway and safety ===
Access to the island is by a tidal causeway. Visitors to the island must check tide times and weather carefully, and seek local advice if in doubt. The road is generally open from about three hours after high tide until two hours before the next high tide, but the period of closure may be extended during stormy weather. Walkers using the causeway over the mud flats are advised that the safe time is shorter. Despite these warnings, about one vehicle each month is stranded on the causeway. Tide tables giving the safe crossing periods are published by Northumberland County Council.

== Volunteering opportunities ==
The reserve supports volunteering opportunities including species recording, habitat and estate management, site wardening, and acting as guides during guided walks.
