= Bring Your Husband To Heel =

- Genre: Factual entertainment, documentary
- Presented by: Annie Clayton
- Country of origin: United Kingdom
- Original language: English

Original release
- Network: BBC Two

Bring Your Husband To Heel is a "hidden camera" documentary series produced by Talkback Thames and shown on BBC Two in 2005. The show featured a professional dog trainer, Annie Clayton, teaching women to use dog training techniques to improve the behaviour of their husbands. The men participating in the programme were told that they were actually taking part in a show about relationship roles.

The BBC received a large number of complaints about the show, with some claiming the show was "sexist, offensive and degrading", "grossly insulting", and "insulting to men and insulting the intelligence of women". The BBC claimed the series "plays on the long-standing stereotype of wives nagging husbands about their failings".

Ofcom later ruled that the show was not sexist: "It was clear from the context that the programme was not seriously proposing a demeaning view of men."

In the Evening Standard, the TV critic Victor Lewis-Smith described the programme as "brainless dross", criticized the BBC for commissioning the series and said that "you'd have to have an IQ commensurate with your shoe size to find this old boot [Clayton] entertaining". Garry Bushell listed it as the worst new show of 2005 in a column in The People.

According to a report in October 2007 in Cape Times, the show also aired in South Africa on BBC Prime.
