= Lindisfarne Mead =

Mead from Northumberland in North East England

Lindisfarne Mead is a mead from Northumberland in North East England. It is manufactured in St Aidan's Winery on Holy Island. The mead is unusual in that it blends honey, the traditional main ingredient of mead, with grapes.

== History ==
Lindisfarne Mead has its roots in the medieval period, when monks inhabited Lindisfarne Priory; they are believed to have made mead. In the 1960s, J. Michael Hackett opened St Aidan's Winery on the island. The mead is distributed internationally.

In 2006, after four decades of negotiations, Lindisfarne Mead began exporting their mead to the United States. US authorities claimed that Lindisfarne mead, as it contained grapes and herbs, was not mead by their definition. It was reported that the product was to be exported to the USA under the name Lindisfarne Mede in order to differentiate it from honey-only meads.

== Production and style ==
Like other mead, Lindisfarne Mead is fermented from honey. The mead is blended with fermented grape juice, herbs, natural well water and a neutral spirits. The honey is sourced from around the world. As a mead that contains grape juice or wine, Lindisfarne mead is considered a pyment.
