= Holy Island, Massachusetts =

Island in Essex County, Massachusetts, United States

Coordinates: 42.729°N 70.825°W

Holy Island is a marshy island located off the northeast coast of Massachusetts, north of Cape Ann. The island is situated immediately west of Plum Island and is part of the Town of Ipswich in Essex County. The Rowley River runs by the island, which is the northernmost of four marshy islands.
