= Lindisfarne =

Tidal island in northeast England

Lindisfarne: Holy Island
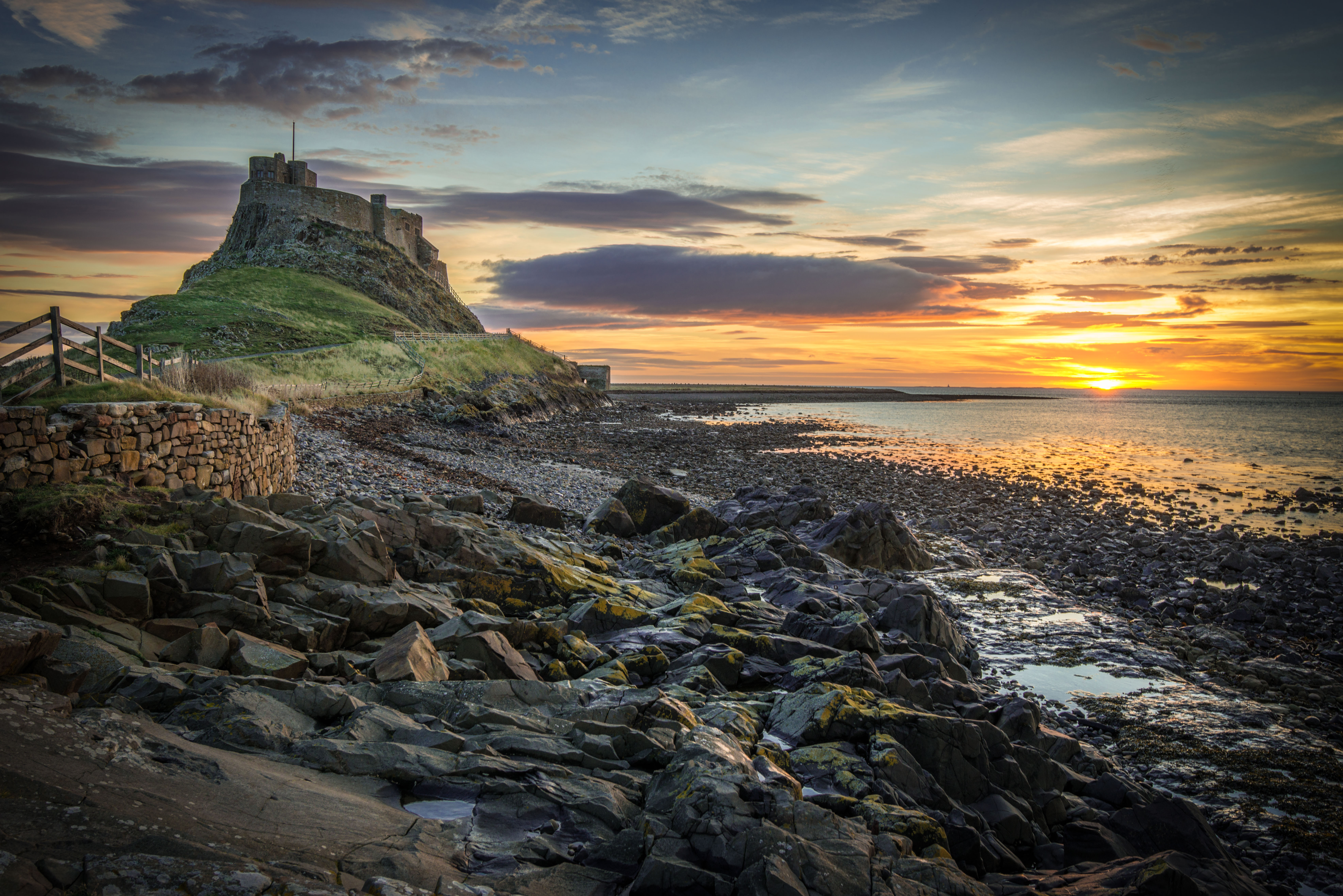
- Lindisfarne Castle

- Location within the United Kingdom
- Population: 151 (2021 census)
- Demonym: Lindisfarnian
- OS grid reference: NU129420
- Civil parish: Holy Island
- Unitary authority: Northumberland
- Region: North East
- Country: England
- Sovereign state: United Kingdom
- Post town: Berwick upon Tweed
- Postcode district: TD15
- Dialling code: 01289
- Police
- Fire
- Ambulance
- UK Parliament: North Northumberland

Ramsar Wetland
- Designated: 5 January 1976
- Reference no.: 70

Lindisfarne, also known as Holy Island, is a tidal island off the northeast coast of England, which constitutes the civil parish of Holy Island in Northumberland. Holy Island has a recorded history from the 6th century AD; it was an important centre of Celtic Christianity under Saints Aidan, Cuthbert, Eadfrith, and Eadberht of Lindisfarne. The island was originally home to a monastery, which was destroyed during the Viking invasions but re-established as a priory following the Norman Conquest of England. Other notable sites built on the island are St Mary the Virgin parish church (originally built in AD 635 and restored in 1860), Lindisfarne Castle, several lighthouses and other navigational markers, and a complex network of lime kilns. The island is part of the Northumberland Coast National Landscape and a hotspot for historical tourism and bird watching.

== Name and etymology ==
=== Name ===
Both the Parker and Peterborough versions of the Anglo-Saxon Chronicle for 793 record the Old English name Lindisfarena.

In the 9th-century Historia Brittonum the island appears under its Old Welsh name Medcaut. The philologist Andrew Breeze, following up on a suggestion by Richard Coates, proposes that the name derived from Latin Medicata [Insula] (English: Healing [Island]), owing perhaps to the island's reputation for medicinal herbs.

The name Holy Island was in use by the 11th century when it appears in Latin as 'Insula Sacra'. The reference was to Saints Aidan and Cuthbert.

In the present day, Holy Island is the name of the civil parish and native inhabitants are known as Islanders. The Ordnance Survey uses Holy Island for both the island and the village, with Lindisfarne listed either as an alternative name for the island or as a name of 'non-Roman antiquity'. "Locally the island is rarely referred to by its Anglo-Saxon name of Lindisfarne" (according to the local community website). More widely, the two names are used somewhat interchangeably. Lindisfarne is invariably used when referring to the pre-conquest monastic settlement, the priory ruins and the castle. The combined phrase "the Holy Island of Lindisfarne" has begun to be used more frequently in recent times, particularly when promoting the island as a destination for tourists and pilgrims alike.

=== Etymology ===
The name Lindisfarne has an uncertain origin. The -farne part of the name may be Old English fearena, genitive plural of fara, meaning traveller. The first part, Lindis-, may refer to people from the Kingdom of Lindsey in modern Lincolnshire, referring to either regular visitors or settlers. Another possibility is that Lindisfarne is Brittonic in origin, containing the element Lind- meaning stream or pool (Welsh llyn), with the nominal morpheme -as(t) and an unknown element identical to that in the Farne Islands. Further suggested is that the name may be a wholly Old Irish formation, from corresponding lind-is-, plus -fearann meaning 'land, territory.' Such an Irish formation, however, could have been based on a pre-existing Brittonic name.

There is also a supposition that the nearby Farne Islands are fern-like in shape and the name may have come from there.

== Geography ==
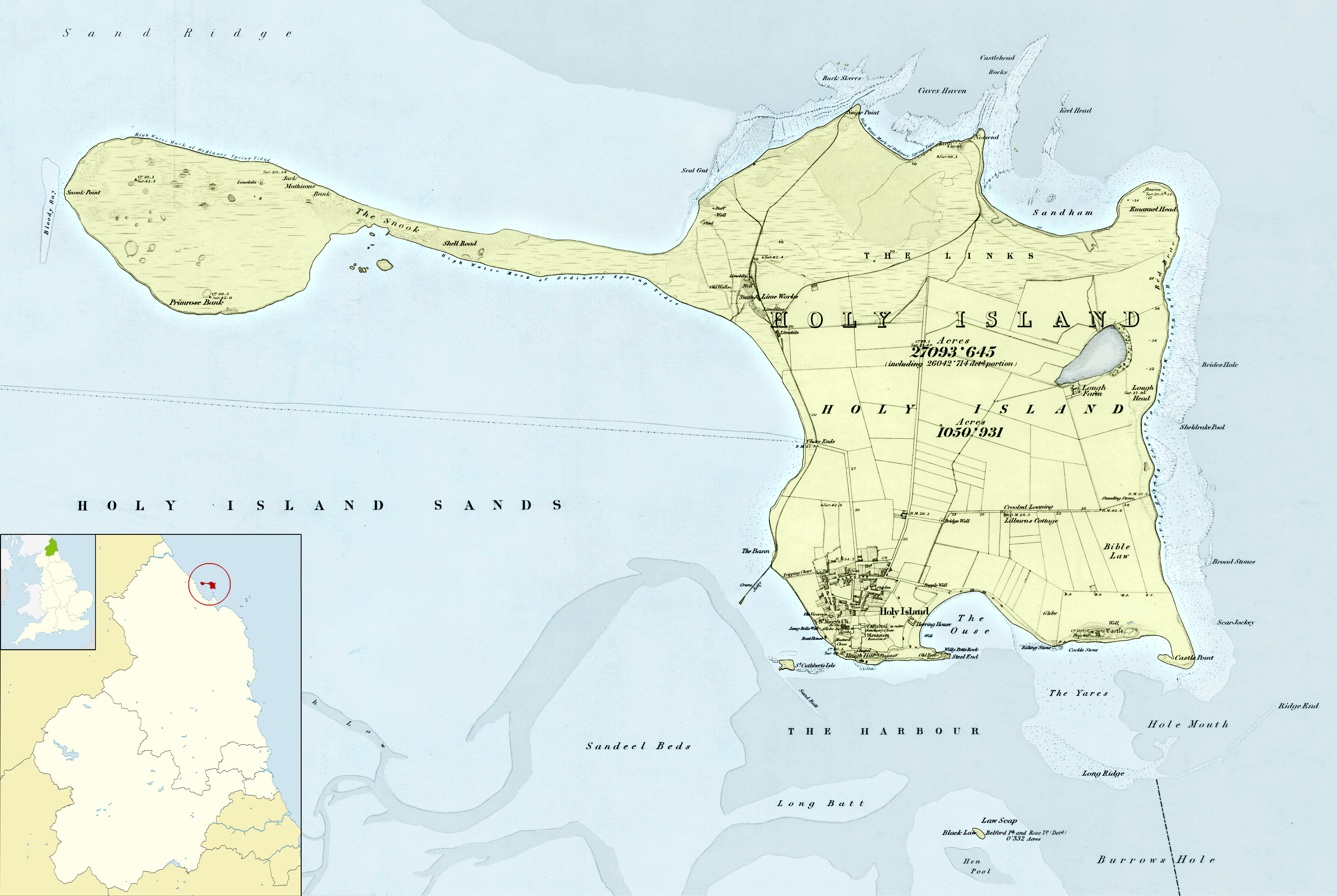
Holy Island (1866). The modern causeway connects to the west end of the island.

The island of Lindisfarne is located along the northeast coast of England, close to the border with Scotland. It measures 3.0 miles (4.8 km) from east to west and 1.5 miles (2.4 km) from north to south, and comprises approximately 1,000 acres (400 hectares) at high tide. The nearest point to the mainland is about 0.8 miles (1.3 kilometres). It is accessible at low tide by a modern causeway and an ancient pilgrims' path that both run over sand and mudflats and which are covered with water at high tide. Lindisfarne is surrounded by the 8,750 acres (3,540 hectares) Lindisfarne National Nature Reserve, which protects the island's sand dunes and the adjacent intertidal habitats. At certain times of year, numerous migratory birds can be seen.

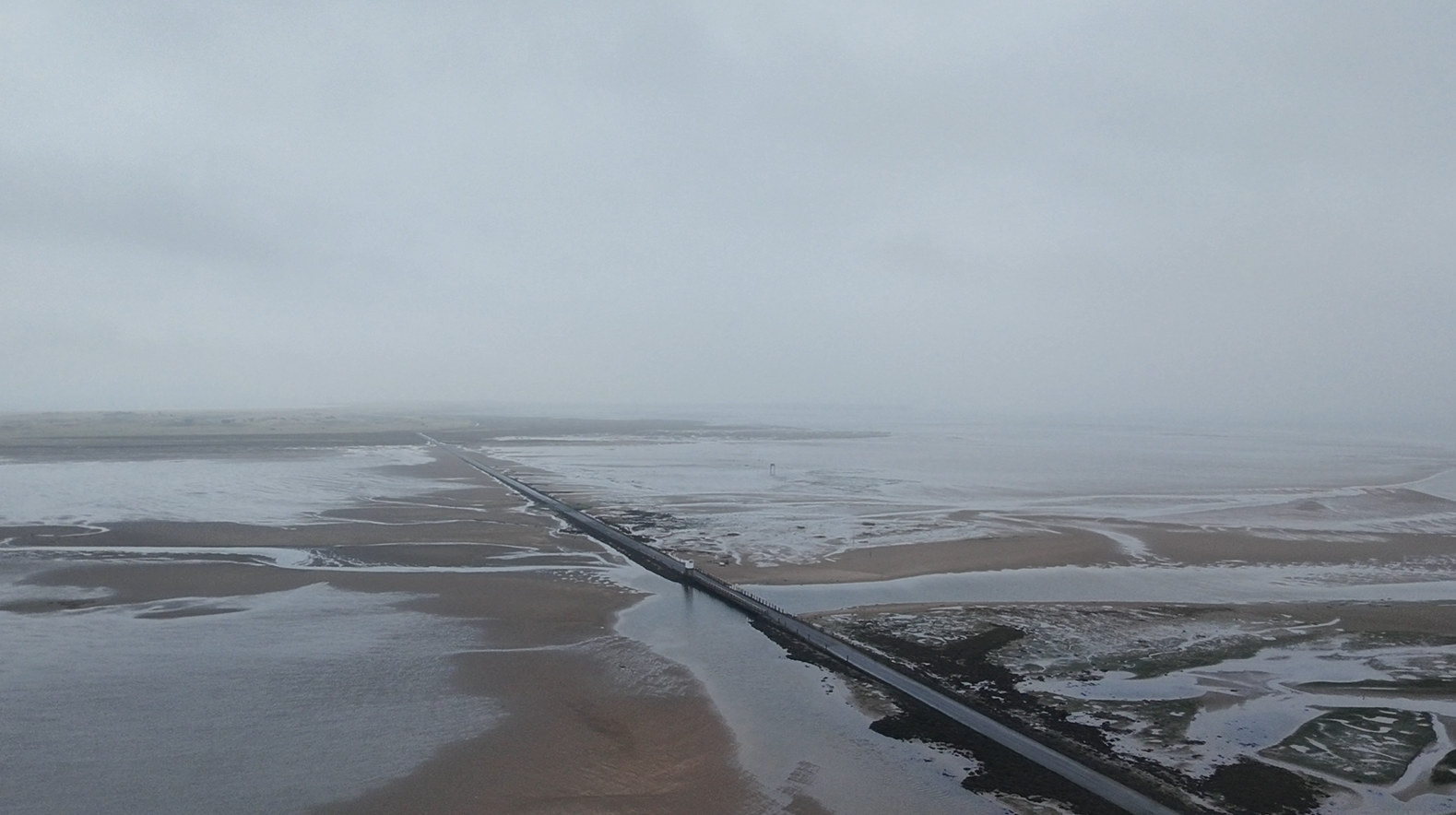
Lindisfarne causeway at low tide, only land vehicular access to island

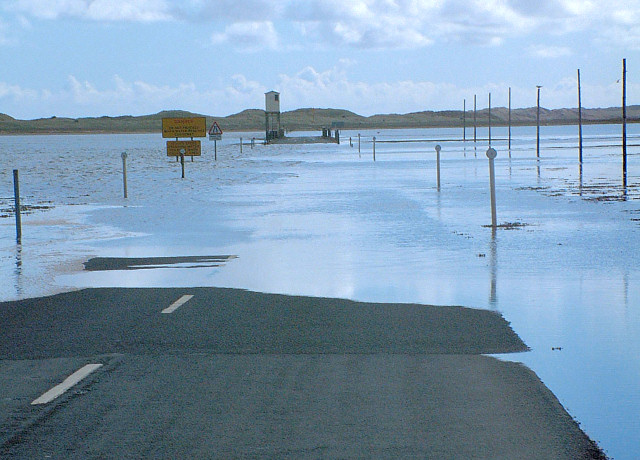
The causeway flooding with a refuge box in the distance

=== Causeway safety ===
Warning signs urge visitors walking to the island to keep to the marked path, to check tide times and weather carefully, and to seek local advice if in doubt. For drivers, tide tables are prominently displayed at both ends of the causeway and also where the Holy Island road leaves the A1 Great North Road at Beal. The causeway is generally open from about three hours after high tide until two hours before the next high tide. Tide tables giving safe crossing periods are published by Northumberland County Council.

Despite these warnings, about one vehicle each month is stranded on the causeway, requiring rescue by HM Coastguard and / or the Seahouses RNLI lifeboat. A sea rescue costs approximately £1,900 (quoted in 2009, equivalent to £3,030 in 2025 (Note: UK Consumer Price Index inflation figures from 1209–2024 based on data from "Inflation calculator". Bank of England. London. 18 February 2026.)), while an air rescue costs more than £4,000 (also quoted in 2009, equivalent to £6,380 in 2025). Local people have opposed a causeway barrier, primarily on convenience grounds. One cause of issues is that the causeway may flood before the end of an officially "safe" period due to stormy weather.

== History ==
=== Early ===
The north-east of England was largely not settled by Roman civilians apart from the Tyne valley and Hadrian's Wall. The area had been little affected during the centuries of nominal Roman occupation. The countryside had been subject to raids from both Scots and Picts and was "not one to attract early Germanic settlement". The Anglian King Ida (reigned from 547) started the sea-borne settlement of the coast, establishing an urbis regia (meaning "royal settlement") at Bamburgh across the bay from Lindisfarne. The conquest was not straightforward, however. The Historia Brittonum recounts how, in the 6th century, Urien, prince of Rheged, with a coalition of North Brittonic kingdoms, besieged Angles led by Theodric of Bernicia on the island for three days and nights, until internal power struggles led to the Britons' defeat.

=== Lindisfarne Priory ===
Lindisfarne Priory was first established in 634 AD by Irish monks. The island served as the site of a monastery for roughly 900 years. The site, most of which has fallen into a state of ruin, has since become a popular tourist destination and focus of pilgrimage journeys. The church of St Mary the Virgin is the only original building that has been more or less continually maintained and which remains standing within the original monastic compound. Remains from the pre-Norman/Anglo-Saxon era can be found in the chancel wall of this church. The monastery was described as an abbey by Bede but when it was rebuilt after the Norman Conquest it was described as a (relatively smaller) priory.

==== Founding and early years ====
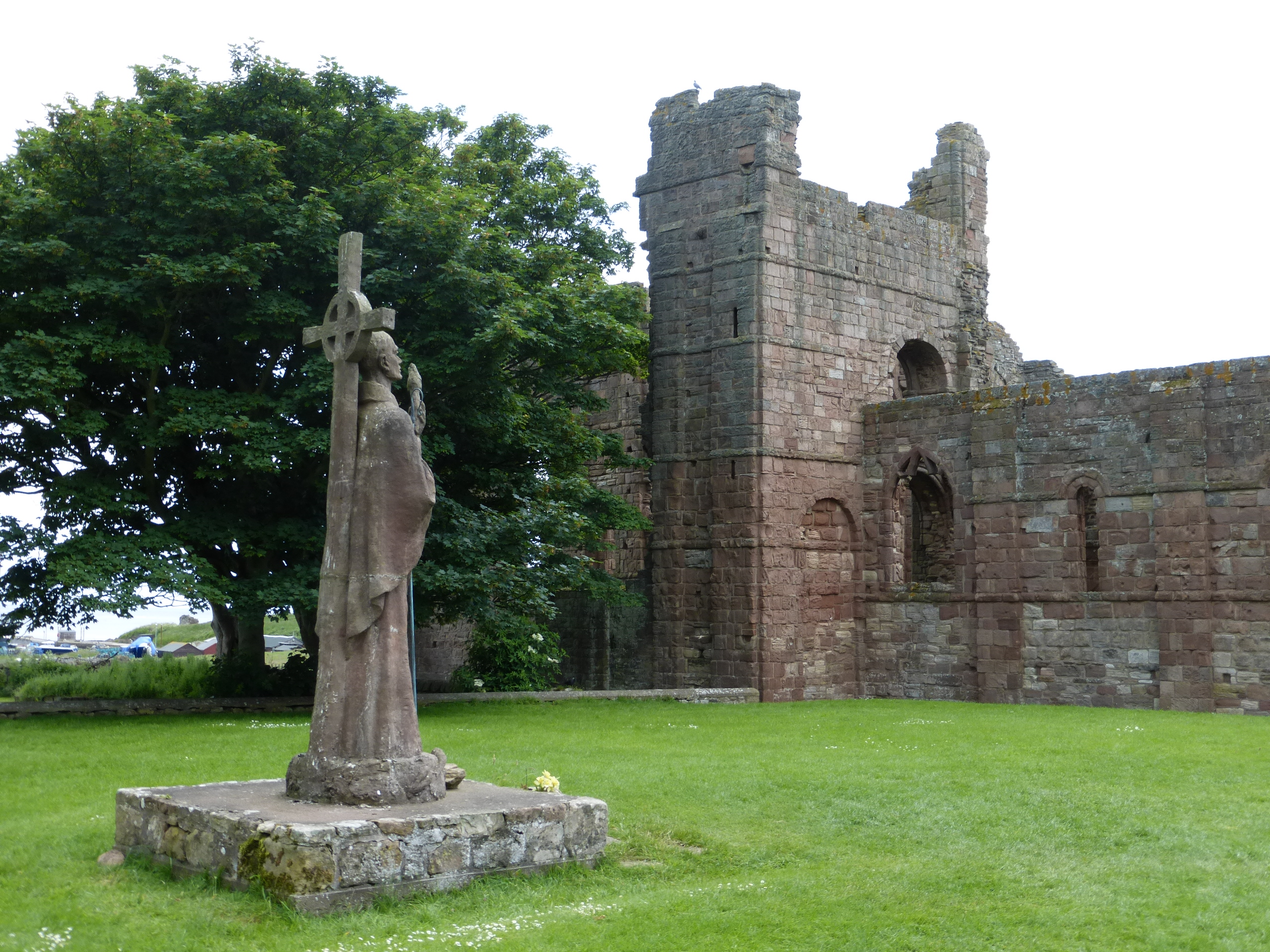
Modern statue of St Aidan beside the ruins of the medieval priory

The monastery of Lindisfarne was founded around 634 by the Irish monk Aidan, who had been sent from Iona off the west coast of Scotland to Northumbria at the request of King Oswald. The abbey was founded before the end of 634 and Aidan remained there until his death in 651 and it acted as a centre of the Christianisation of Northumbria. The abbey and its church remained the only seat of a bishopric in Northumbria for nearly thirty years. Finan (bishop 651–661) built a timber church "suitable for a bishop's seat". Bede, however, was critical of the fact that the church was not built of stone but only of hewn oak thatched with reeds. A later bishop, Eadbert, removed the thatch and covered both walls and roof in lead. An abbot, who could be the bishop, was elected by the brethren and led the community. Bede comments on this:

And let no one be surprised that, though we have said above that in this island of Lindisfarne, small as it is, there is found the seat of a bishop, now we say also that it is the home of an abbot and monks; for it actually is so. For one and the same dwelling-place of the servants of God holds both; and indeed all are monks. Aidan, who was the first bishop of this place, was a monk and always lived according to monastic rule together with all his followers. Hence all the bishops of that place up to the present time exercise their episcopal functions in such a way that the abbot, who they themselves have chosen by the advice of the brethren, rules the monastery; and all the priests, deacons, singers and readers and other ecclesiastical grades, together with the bishop himself, keep the monastic rule in all things.

Following the death of bishop Finan in 661, Colman became Bishop of Lindisfarne. There were significant liturgical and theological differences with the fledgling Roman party based at Canterbury. According to Frank Stenton: "There is no trace of any intercourse between these bishops [the Mercians] and the see of Canterbury". The Synod of Whitby in 663 changed this, as allegiance switched southwards to Canterbury and then to Rome. Colman departed his see for Iona, and for the next few years Lindisfarne had no bishop. Under a new line of bishops aligned with Canterbury Lindisfarne became the base for Christian evangelism in Northern England, and also sent a successful mission to Mercia. Monks from the Irish community of Iona settled on the island.

==== Cuthbert as bishop ====
Statue of St Cuthbert at prayer

Northumbria's patron saint, Cuthbert, was a monk and later abbot of the monastery. St Cuthbert has been described as "possibly the most venerated saint in England". Cuthbert's miracles and life are recorded by Bede. Cuthbert was Bishop of Lindisfarne from 684 until 686, shortly before his death. An anonymous "Life of Cuthbert" written at Lindisfarne is the oldest extant piece of English historical writing.

From its reference to "Aldfrith, who now reigns peacefully", the "Life of Cuthbert" is considered to date from between 685 and 704. While bishop and abbot, Cuthbert took it upon himself to align his bishopric with the see of Canterbury, and therefore with Rome, while leaving its Celtic leanings and traditions behind. After his death in 687 Cuthbert was initially buried in Lindisfarne. Due to the claim that Cuthbert's body was untouched by 'corruption', and also due to there being several miracles associated with those who had come to visit Cuthbert's shrine, the island became a major destination for pilgrimages for the next few hundred years.

During one of the many evacuations of Lindisfarne by the monks due to the increasing frequency of Viking raids upon the island at the time, in 793 Cuthbert's body was carried away by the monks, first to where they temporarily re-settled in the nearby village of Chester-le-Street, then to Durham Cathedral c. 995. Eadberht of Lindisfarne, the next bishop (and later saint), was buried in the place from which Cuthbert's body had been exhumed earlier in the same year (793).

==== 8th and 9th centuries ====
In 735, the northern ecclesiastical province of England was established, with the archbishopric at York. There were only three bishops under York: Hexham, Lindisfarne and Whithorn, whereas Canterbury had the 12 envisioned by St Augustine.

At that time the Diocese of York roughly encompassed the counties of Yorkshire and Lancashire. Hexham covered County Durham and the southern part of modern Northumberland up to the River Coquet, and eastwards into the Pennines. Whithorn covered most of Dumfries and Galloway region west of Dumfries itself. The remainder, Cumbria, northern Northumbria, Lothian and much of the Kingdom of Strathclyde formed the diocese of Lindisfarne.

In 737, Ceolwulf of Northumbria abdicated as King of Northumbria and entered the abbey at Lindisfarne. He died in 764 and was buried alongside Cuthbert. In 830, his body was moved to Norham-upon-Tweed, and later his head was translated to Durham Cathedral.

==== Lindisfarne Gospels ====
In the early 8th century the illuminated manuscript known as the Lindisfarne Gospels, an illustrated Latin copy of the Gospels of Matthew, Mark, Luke and John, was made, probably at Lindisfarne. The artist was possibly Eadfrith, who became Bishop of Lindisfarne. It is also speculated that a team of illuminators and calligraphers (monks of Lindisfarne Abbey) worked on the text, but if so, their identities are unknown. In the second half of the 10th century, a monk named Aldred added an Old English gloss to the Latin text, producing the earliest surviving Old English/Northumbrian copies of the Gospels. Aldred attributed the original to Eadfrith (bishop 698–721). The Gospels were written with a good hand, but it is the illustrations, done in an insular style containing a fusion of Celtic, Germanic and Roman elements, that are considered to be of the most value. According to Aldred, Eadfrith's successor Æthelwald was responsible for pressing and binding the book, before it was covered with a fine metal case made by a hermit known as Billfrith. The Lindisfarne Gospels reside in the British Library in London, a location which has caused controversy amongst some Northumbrians. In 1971, professor Suzanne Kaufman of Rockford, Illinois presented a facsimile copy of the Gospels to the clergy of the island.

==== Viking raid on the monastery (793) ====
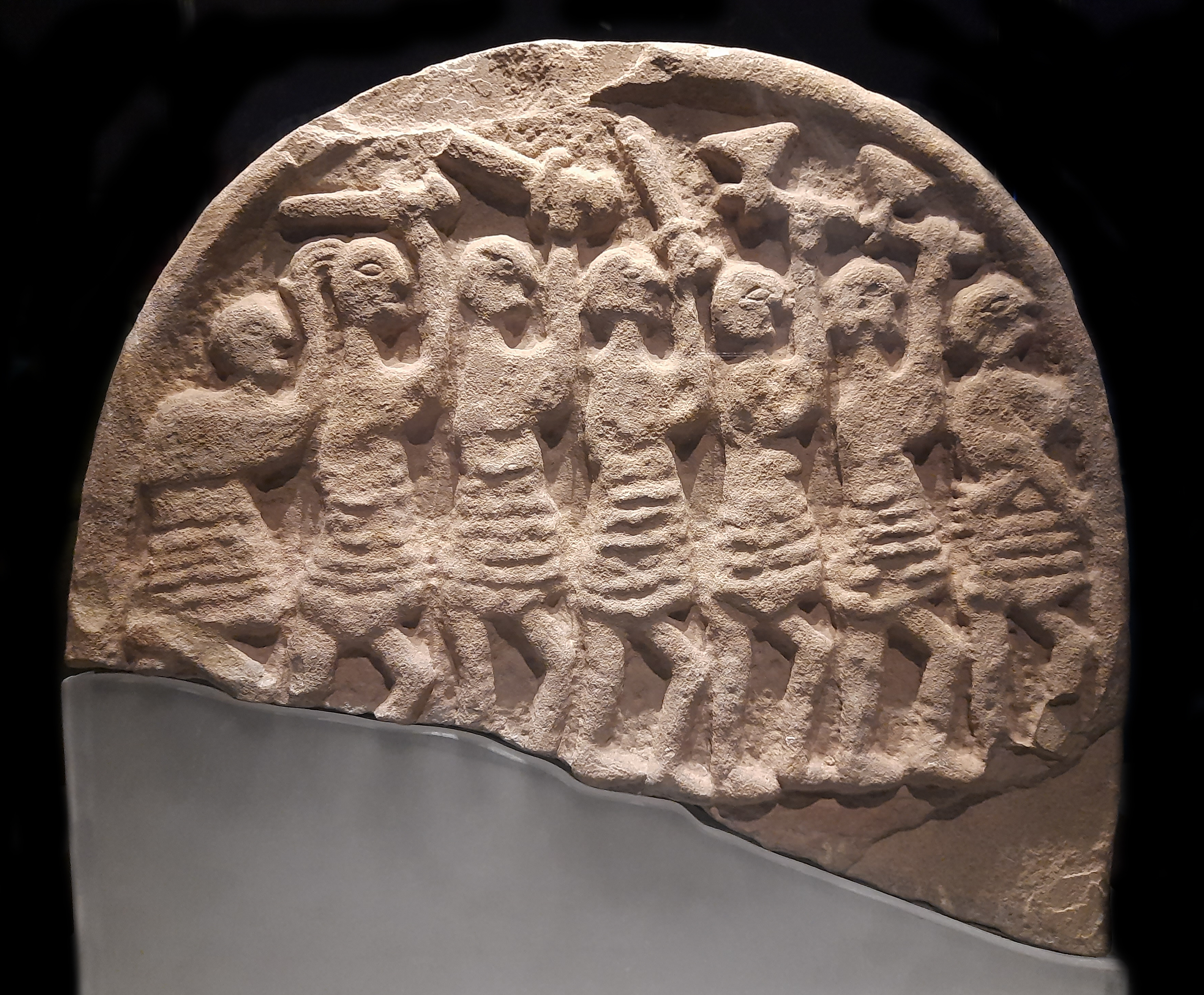
Lindisfarne Stone, also known as Viking Raider Doomsday Stone, Northumbrian carved gravestone, 9th century, found in Lindisfarne. The armed warriors are perhaps Viking raiders.

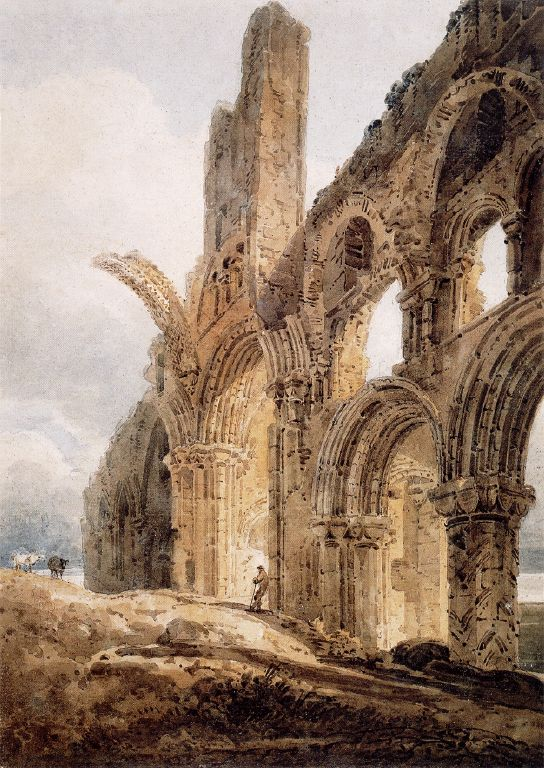
The Ruins of Lindisfarne Priory, by Thomas Girtin, 1798. The priory's rainbow arch, which survives, is shown truncated for artistic effect.

In 793, a Viking raid on Lindisfarne (Note: Lindisfarne's shelving beaches provided a supposedly perfect landing for the shallow-draft ships of the Viking raiders who fell upon its unsuspecting and virtually unprotected monks in the summer of 793. This bloody assault on a "place more venerable than all in Britain" was one of the first positively recorded Viking raids on the west. Lindisfarne was supposedly a good place to attack because people in the dark ages would send their valuables to Lindisfarne, similar to a bank, for safekeeping. Viking longships, with their shallow drafts and good manoeuvrability under both sail and oar, allowed their crews to strike deep inland up Europe's major rivers. The world of the Vikings consisted of a loose grouping of the Scandinavian homelands and overseas colonies, linked by sea routes that reached across the Baltic and the North Sea, spanning even the Atlantic.) caused consternation throughout the Christian west, and is often taken as the beginning of the Viking Age. There had been other Viking raids, but according to English Heritage this one was particularly significant, because "it attacked the sacred heart of the Northumbrian kingdom, desecrating 'the very place where the Christian religion began in our nation'". The D and E versions of the West Saxon Anglo-Saxon Chronicle record:

Her wæron reðe forebecna cumene ofer Norðhymbra land, ⁊ þæt folc earmlic bregdon, þæt wæron ormete þodenas ⁊ ligrescas, ⁊ fyrenne dracan wæron gesewene on þam lifte fleogende. Þam tacnum sona fyligde mycel hunger, ⁊ litel æfter þam, þæs ilcan geares on .vi. Idus Ianuarii, earmlice hæþenra manna hergunc adilegode Godes cyrican in Lindisfarnaee þurh hreaflac ⁊ mansliht.

Translation:

In this year fierce, foreboding omens came over the land of the Northumbrians, and the wretched people shook; there were excessive whirlwinds, lightning, and fiery dragons were seen flying in the sky. These signs were followed by great famine, and a little after those, that same year on 6th ides of January, the ravaging of wretched heathen men destroyed God's church at Lindisfarne.

The generally accepted date for the Viking raid on Lindisfarne is 8 June; Michael Swanton writes: "vi id Ianr, presumably [is] an error for vi id Iun (8 June) which is the date given by the Annals of Lindisfarne (p. 505), when better sailing weather would favour coastal raids." (Note: This may be confusing to modern readers. The 6 refers to the number of days before the Ides, not after. The day itself was included, and so vi id was 6 days before the ides, counting the ides as 1. In June the ides falls on the 13th of the month, so "vi id Jun" was actually 8 June. See Roman calendar for full details.)

Alcuin, a Northumbrian scholar in Charlemagne's court at the time, wrote: "Never before has such terror appeared in Britain as we have now suffered from a pagan race [...] The heathens poured out the blood of saints around the altar, and trampled on the bodies of saints in the temple of God, like dung in the streets." During the attack many of the monks were killed, or captured and enslaved.

Biographer Peter Ackroyd suggests: "The monasteries of Lindisfarne and Jarrow were not attacked at random; they were chosen as examples of revenge. The onslaught of the Christian Charlemagne on the 'pagans' of the north had led to the extirpation of their shrines and sanctuaries. The great king had cut down Jôrmunr, the holy tree of the Norse people. What better form of retaliation than to lay waste the foundations devoted to the Christian God? The Christian missionaries to Norway had in fact set out from Lindisfarne." However, the raid on Lindisfarne took place decades after Charlemagne's campaigns against the Saxons. Neither the Anglo-Saxon Chronicle nor any surviving Norse document ascribes a motivation to the raid on the monastery.

As the English population became more settled, they seemed to have abandoned seafaring. Many monasteries were established on islands, peninsulas, river mouths and cliffs, as isolated communities were less susceptible to interference and the politics of the heartland. These preliminary raids, despite their brutal nature, were not followed up. The main body of the raiders passed north around Scotland. The 9th-century invasions came not from Norway, but from the Danes from around the entrance to the Baltic. The first Danish raids into England were in the Isle of Sheppey, Kent during 835 and from there their influence spread north. During this period religious art continued to flourish on Lindisfarne, and the Liber Vitae of Durham began in the abbey. By 866, the Danes were in York, and in 873 the Danish army was moving into Northumberland. With the collapse of the Northumbrian kingdom, the monks of Lindisfarne fled the island in 875 taking with them St Cuthbert's bones (which are now buried at Durham Cathedral), who during his life had been prior and bishop of Lindisfarne; his body was buried on the island in the year 698.

Prior to the 9th century, Lindisfarne Abbey had, in common with other such establishments, held large tracts of land which were managed directly or leased to farmers with a life interest only. Following the Danish occupation, land was increasingly owned by individuals, and could be bought, sold and inherited. Following the Battle of Corbridge in 914 Ragnald seized the land giving some to his followers Scula and Onlafbal.

==== Prior to dissolution of the monasteries ====
Once the region had been restored to political and military stability under the government of William the Conqueror, the prospects for the rebuilding of the island's monastery began to improve. The first Norman Bishop of Durham, William of St Calais endowed his new Benedictine monastery at Durham with land and property in Northumberland, including Holy Island and much of the surrounding mainland. Durham Priory then re-established a monastery on the island in 1093. The monastery was re-established as a smaller "priory" which was to be administered as a sub-monastery of the Durham priory. Smaller monasteries are often referred to as priories while larger monasteries are more commonly referred to as abbeys.

Under Norman rule, by 1150 the island's parish church had also been fully rebuilt over part of the site of the pre-Norman abbey. The newly constructed chapel included a cenotaph (an empty tomb) marking the spot where Cuthbert's body was believed to have been buried. Although his body by then had been relocated in Durham Cathedral, the place of his former primary shrine on Lindisfarne was still considered by many to be sacred ground and continued to draw pilgrims. The pre-Norman island bishopric of Lindisfarne was not restored under Norman rule, perhaps because the newer and more centrally located bishopric of Durham was then better able to meet the church's administrative needs in the area.

As such, the island's restored but slightly smaller Benedictine monastery (sized as a priory under Norman rule) was then able to continue in relative peace under the new Norman monarchy and its successor royal houses for the next four centuries until its final dissolution in 1536 as a result of Henry VIII's dissolution of the English church's ties to Rome, and his subsequent closing of the monasteries.

==== After dissolution of the priory ====
Even with the closure of the island's priory in 1536, the tradition of making religious pilgrimages to the island never ceased. In the 20th century (c. 1980~1990), religious author and cleric David Adam reported that he had ministered to thousands of pilgrims and other visitors as rector of Holy Island. In the 21st century the tradition of making pilgrimage to Lindisfarne continues to be observed annually, as can be attested to by the Northern Cross Pilgrimage amongst others. The priory ruins which make for a popular tourist and pilgrimage destination, were built just after the Norman conquest, and date back to nearly 1,000 years ago. The chancel wall of the church dates back even further into Anglo-Saxon times.

==== Architecture and archaeology ====
In 1838 Henry George Charles Clarke wrote a scholarly description of the priory. Clarke surmised that this Norman priory was unique in that the centre aisle had a vault of stone. Of the six arches, Clarke stated "as if the architect had not previously calculated the space to be occupied by his arcade. The effect here has been to produce a horseshoe arch instead of a semicircular arch, from its being of the same height, but lesser span, than the others. This arch is very rare, even in Norman buildings". The Lindisfarne Priory (ruin) is a grade I listed building, List Entry Number 1042304. Other parts of the priory are a scheduled monument, List Entry Number 1011650. The latter are described as "the site of the pre-Conquest monastery of Lindisfarne and the Benedictine cell of Durham Cathedral that succeeded it in the 11th century".

Archaeologists led by DigVentures and the University of Durham have been conducting community excavations since 2016 outside the priory. A total of nine consecutive field seasons (including those planned for 2024) have unearthed numerous insights for the site. Artefacts of note recovered included a rare board game piece, copper-alloy rings and Anglo-Saxon coins from both Northumbria and Wessex. The discovery of a cemetery led to finding commemorative markers "unique to the 8th and 9th centuries". The group also found evidence of an early medieval building, "which seems to have been constructed on top of an even earlier industrial oven" which was used to make copper or glass.

=== Historical island economy ===
==== Middle Ages economy ====
Monastic records from the 14th to the 16th century provide evidence of an already well-established fishing economy on the island. Both line fishing and net fishing were practised, inshore in shallow waters and in the deep water offshore, using a variety of vessels: contemporary accounts differentiate between small 'cobles' and larger 'boats', as well as singling out certain specialised vessels (such as a 'herynger', sold for £2 in 1404). As well as supplying food for the monastic community, the island's fisheries (together with those of nearby Farne) provided the mother house at Durham with fish, on a regular (sometimes weekly) basis. Fish caught included cod, haddock, herring, salmon, porpoise and mullet, among others. Shellfish of various types were also fished for, with lobster nets and oyster dredges being mentioned in the accounts. Fish surplus to the needs of the monastery was traded, but subject to a tithe. There is also evidence that the monks operated a lime kiln on the island.

In 1462, during the Wars of the Roses, Margaret of Anjou made an abortive attempt to seize the Northumbrian castles. Following a storm at sea 400 troops had to seek shelter on Holy Island, where they surrendered to the Yorkists.

==== Post priory dissolution economy ====
After King Henry VIII's dissolution of the monasteries in 1536, Lindisfarne Priory was made to close its doors for the last time. The buildings of the old priory were then repurposed for use as a naval storehouse. As such, one of the economic focal points of the island became the military post which would be staffed by military personnel from time to time, instead of the former activities of the defunct monastery. Over the coming centuries, most of the priory complex buildings gradually fell into ruin. In 1613 ownership of the island (and other land in the area formerly pertaining to Durham Priory) was transferred to the Crown.

The lime kilns by the castle

In the 1860s a Dundee firm built lime kilns on Lindisfarne, and lime was burnt on the island until at least the end of the 19th century. The kilns are among the most complex in Northumberland. Horses carried limestone, along the Holy Island Waggonway, from a quarry on the north side of the island to the lime kilns, where it was burned with coal transported from Dundee on the east coast of Scotland. There are still traces of the jetties by which the coal was imported and the lime exported close by at the foot of the crags. The remains of the waggonway between the quarries and the kilns makes for an easy walk.

At the peak of the limestone quarrying and processing operations on the island, over 100 men were employed by these operations. Crinoid columnals, a certain type of intricate fossil with a hole in the middle which is sometimes found in limestone, were separated from the quarried stone and then milled smooth into beads. The remaining quarried limestone material would then be processed into lime. These more valuable beads would then be threaded onto necklaces and rosaries and exported from the island. The beads became known as St Cuthbert's beads.

The large-scale quarrying in the 19th century had a devastating effect on the limestone caves, but eight sea caves remain at Coves Haven. Workings on the lime kilns stopped by the start of the 20th century. The lime kilns on Lindisfarne are among the few being actively preserved in Northumberland.

Holy Island Golf Club was founded in 1907 but closed in the 1960s.

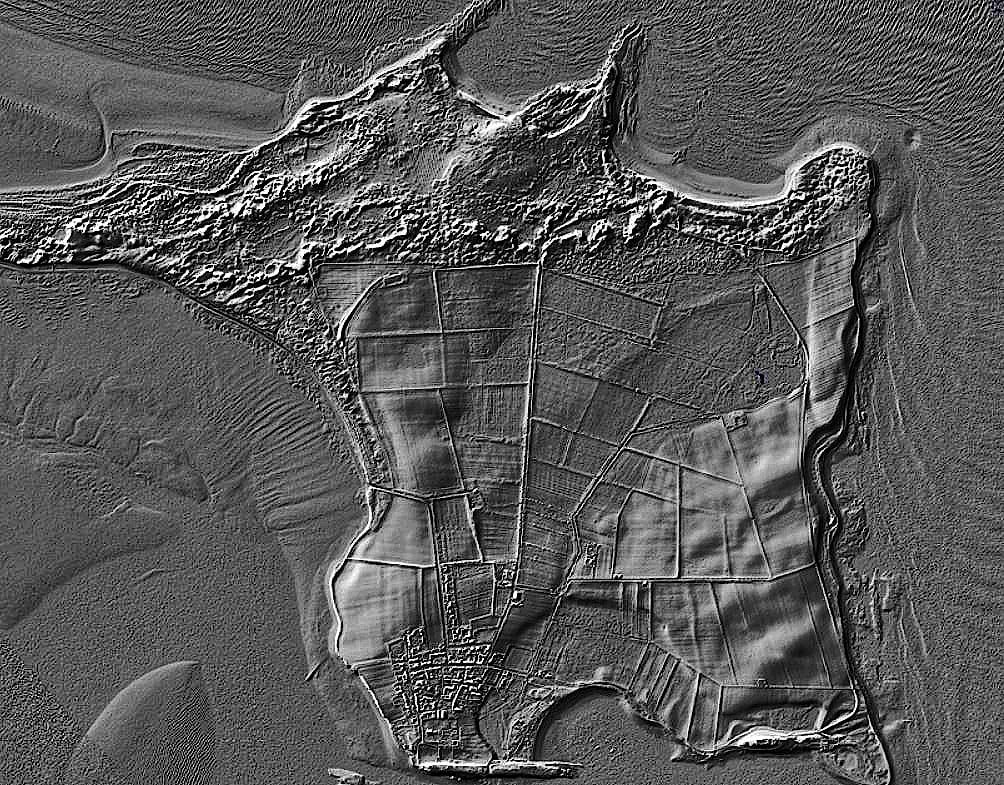
A lidar view.

==== 21st-century economy ====
Lindisfarne was mainly a fishing community for many years, with farming and the production of lime also of some importance.

Lindisfarne is well known for mead. When monks inhabited the island, it was thought that if the soul was in God's keeping, the body must be fortified with Lindisfarne mead. Lindisfarne Mead is produced at St Aidan's Winery, and sold widely. The mead recipe remains a secret of the family which produces it.

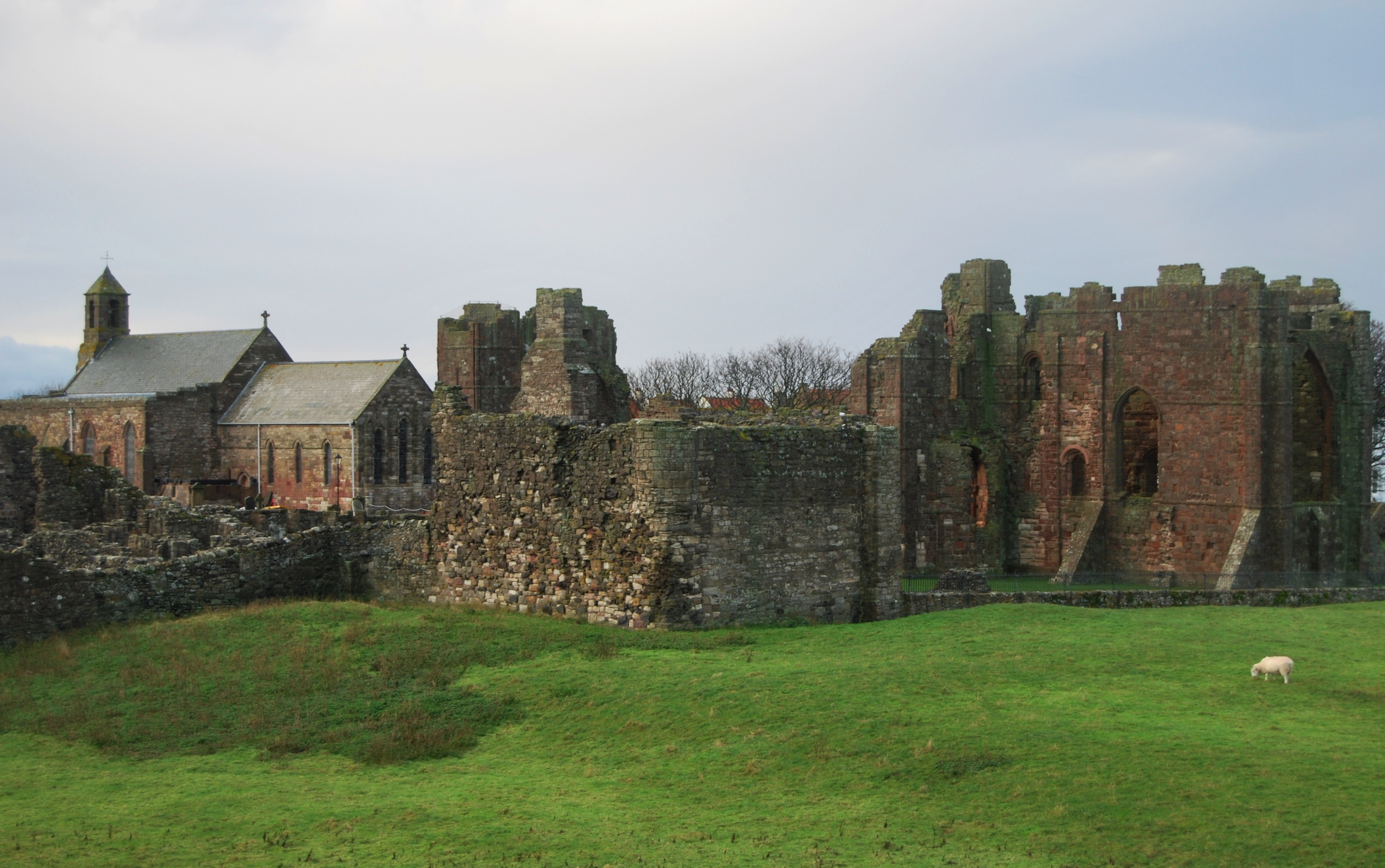
Lindisfarne Priory and St Mary's

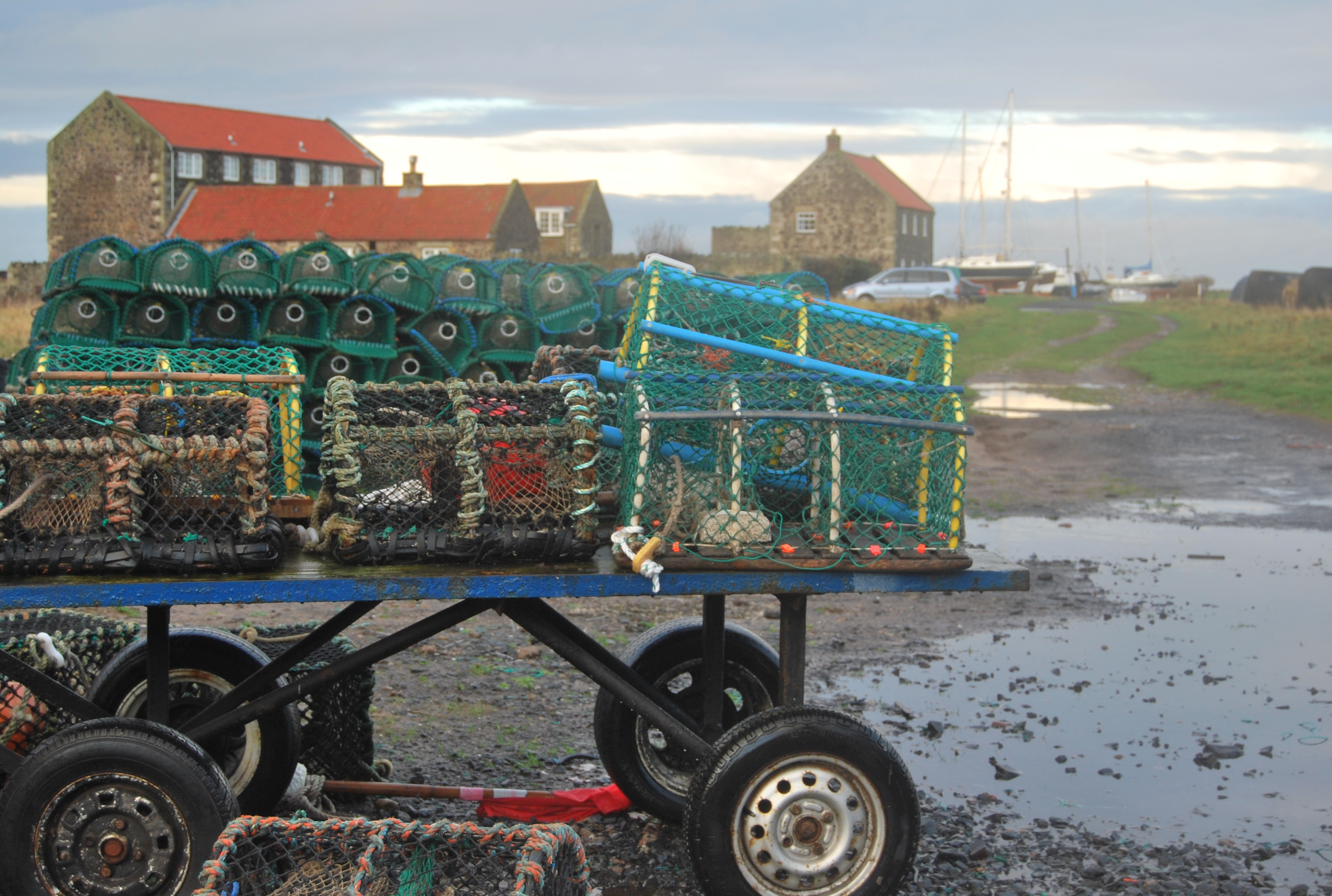
Lindisfarne lobster pots

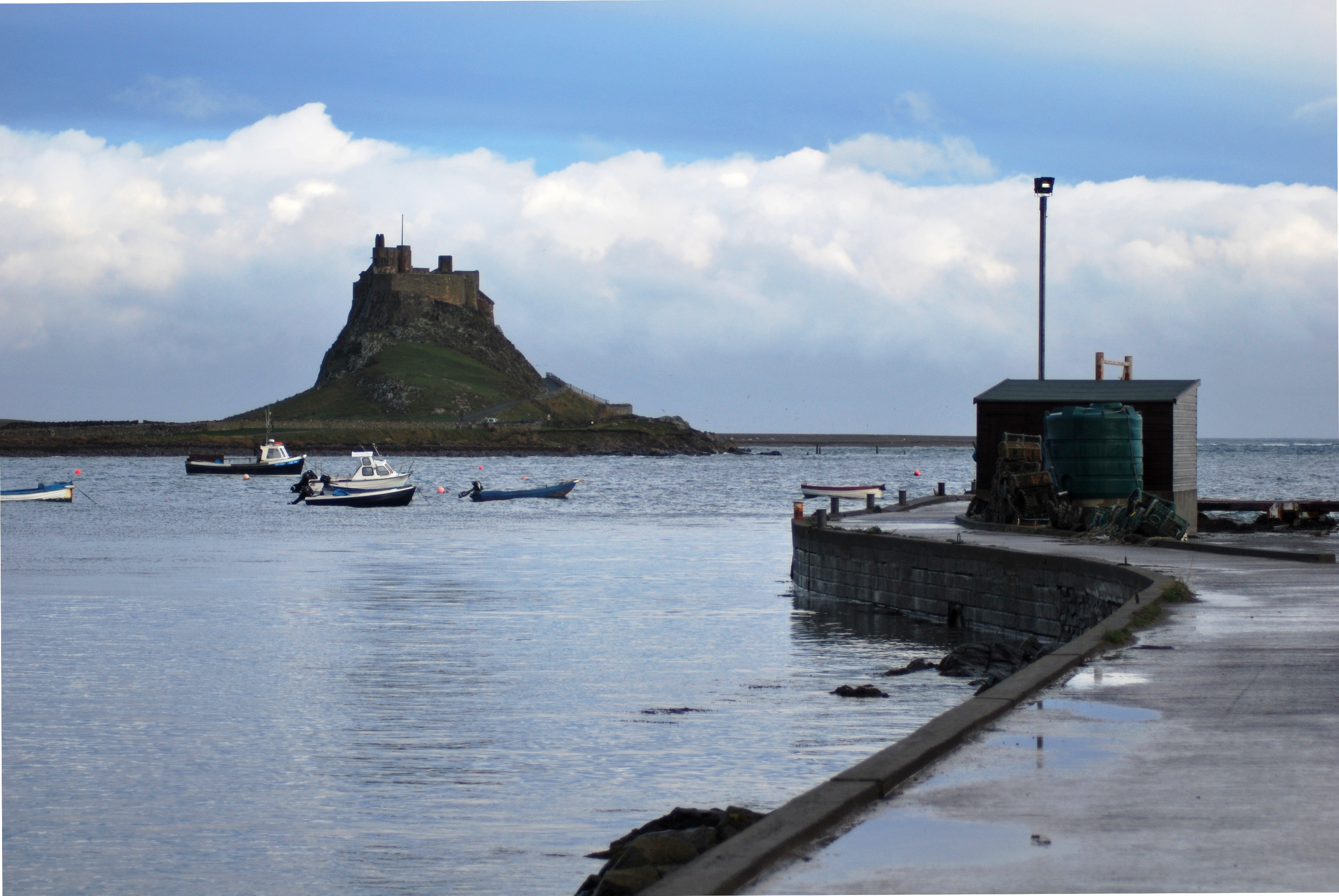
Lindisfarne Castle from the harbour

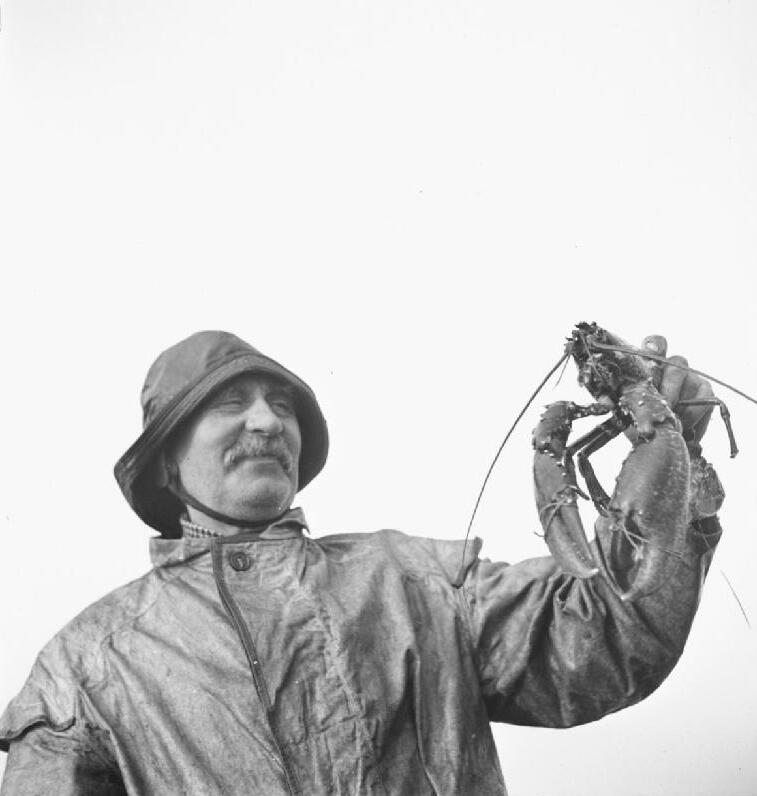
A Lindisfarne fisherman in 1942

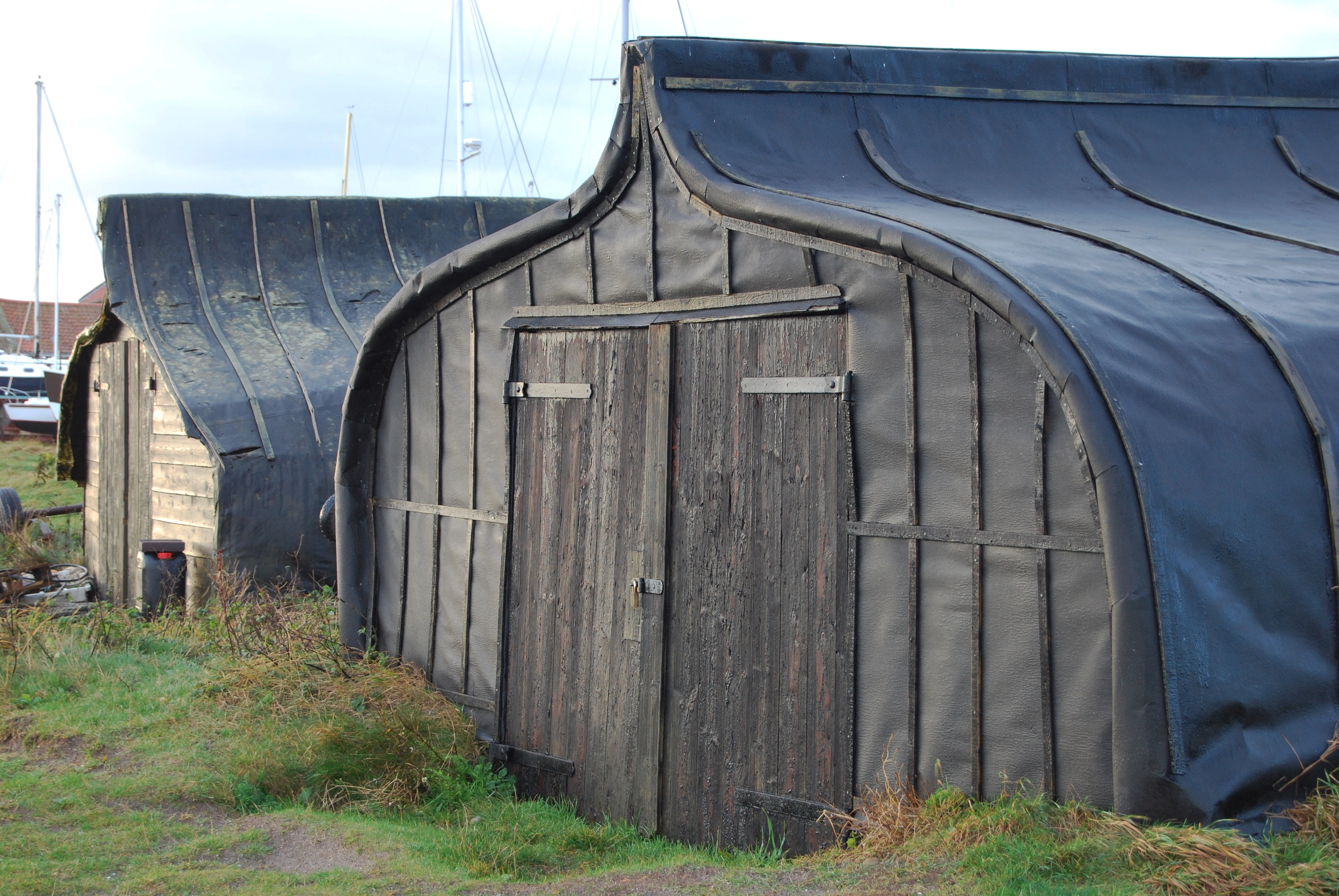
Upturned boats in the harbour of Lindisfarne used as sheds

== Community and demographics ==
At the 2021 census, Holy Island parish had a population of 151 people in 77 households.

Census population of Holy Island civil parish
| Census | Population | Female | Male | Households | Source |
|---|---|---|---|---|---|
| 2001 | 162 | 79 | 83 | 88 | |
| 2011 | 180 | 95 | 85 | 99 | |
| 2021 | 151 | 76 | 75 | 77 | |

A February 2020 report provided an update on community facilities. At the time, three pubs and a hotel were operating; the shop had closed but the post office remained in operation. No professional or medical services were available and residents were driving to Berwick-upon-Tweed for groceries and other supplies.

In response to the perceived lack of affordable housing on the isle of Lindisfarne, in 1996 a group of islanders established a charitable foundation known as the Holy Island of Lindisfarne Community Development Trust. They built a visitor centre on the island using the profits from sales. In addition, 11 community houses were built and are rented out to community members who want to continue to live on the island. The trust is also responsible for management of the inner harbour. The Holy Island Partnership was formed in 2009 by members of the community as well as organisations and groups operating on the island.

== Additional points of interest ==
=== Church of St Mary the Virgin ===
The current parish church stands on the site of the wooden church built by St Aidan in AD 635. When the site was rebuilt by the Normans, the site of the original abbey church was redeveloped in stone as the parish church. It is the oldest building on the island that has been maintained in some fashion, and which has a roof on it. Remains of the Anglo-Saxon church exist as the chancel wall and arch. A Norman apse (subsequently replaced in the 13th century) led eastwards from the chancel. The nave was extended in the 12th century with a northern arcade, and in the following century with a southern arcade.

After the Reformation the church slipped into disrepair until the restoration of 1860. The church is built of coloured sandstone which has had the Victorian plaster removed from it. The north aisle is known as the "fishermen's aisle" and houses the altar of St. Peter. The south aisle used to hold the altar of St. Margaret of Scotland, but now houses the organ.

The church is a grade I listed building number 1042304, listed as part of the whole priory. The church forms most of the earliest part of the site and is a scheduled ancient monument number 1011650. The Church of St Mary the Virgin has daily services of worship.

=== St Cuthbert's Isle (Hobthrush) ===
... Now indeed
at the first beginning
of his solitary life,
he retired to
a certain place (Note: A Journey to Lindisfarne (Alistair Moffat): "This certain place was the islet of Hobthrush")
in the outer precincts
of the monastery
which seemed to be
more secluded... (Note: A Journey to Lindisfarne (Alistair Moffat): "Bede wrote that it was more secluded, 'secretior [...] translation of original Latin might be 'more solitary', 'more deserted')
(Latin: sēcrētus)

— Bede

St Cuthbert's Isle, also known as Hobthrush, is a small islet of black dolerite rock, described by Bede as being "in the outer precincts of the monastery". (Note: Historic England: "A chapel dedicated to St Cuthbert is mentioned by Bede (AD 673–735) and described as being in the outer precincts of the Anglo-Saxon monastery; it is believed to refer to this island.") The islet is reputed to be the place where Cuthbert spent "the first beginning of his solitary life". (Note: Cartwright, The Holy Island: "This small island ... was the site of Cuthbert's earliest retreats before he went to the Farnes, and Eadberht, also, was in the habit of isolating himself there in Lent.")

The islet is a short distance from Holy Island.

It is possible to walk across sand and rocks to the islet when tidal conditions allow. (Note: Alistair Moffat, A Journey to Lindisfarne: "The tide had retreated far enough to allow safe passage across the sand and rocks to Hobthrush, St Cuthbert's Isle ...") (Note: Distances from St Cuthbert's Isle: 1. Holy Island – about 0.12 miles (0.19 km); 2. Monastery – about 0.18 miles (0.29 km))

There are the remains of a medieval chapel, designated as a scheduled monument:

- Stone-built chapel – post-Norman Conquest
- Earthwork bank
- Semicircular mound, possibly the remains of a circular monastic cell
- Modern wooden cross

The name "Hobthrush" relates to Hob (folklore) – the similarly named "Hob-trush" is also found in North Yorkshire (see Hob (folklore) § North York Moors). It is possible that the name was introduced by migrant workers while working on Holy Island.

=== Lindisfarne Castle ===
Lindisfarne Castle was built in 1550, around the time that Lindisfarne Priory went out of use, and stones from the priory were used as building material. It is very small by the usual standards, and was more of a fort. The castle sits on the highest point of the island, a whinstone hill called Beblowe.

After Henry VIII suppressed the priory, his troops used the remains as a naval store. In 1542 Henry VIII ordered the Earl of Rutland to fortify the site against possible Scottish invasion. Sir John Harington and the Master Mason of Berwick started to plan to build two earth bulwarks, although Rutland advised the use of stone from the priory. In September 1544 a Scottish fleet led by John Barton in the Mary Willoughby threatened the English coast. It was thought the Scottish ships might try to burn Lindisfarne, so orders were given to repair the decayed bulwark or blockhouse at Holy Island.

By December 1547, Ralph Cleisbye, Captain of the fort, had guns including a wheel-mounted demi-culverin, two brass sakers, a falcon, and another fixed demi-culverin. However, Beblowe Crag itself was not fortified until 1549 and Sir Richard Lee saw only a decayed platform and turf rampart there in 1565. Elizabeth I then had work carried out on the fort, strengthening it and providing gun platforms for the developments in artillery technology. When James VI and I came to power in England, he combined the Scottish and English thrones, and the need for the castle declined. At that time the castle was still garrisoned from Berwick and protected the small Lindisfarne Harbour.

During the Jacobite rising of 1715 the Earl of Mar (later commander of the Jacobite army) planned for a Franco-Spanish invasion of North-East England to link up with indigenous Jacobites and the Scottish army marching south. Holy Island was regarded by Mar as the ideal place for a landing. The following day, however, he decided on a more southerly landing.

Lindisfarne was close to Bamburgh which at that time was owned by Thomas Forster who was a committed Jacobite. The Jacobites wanted to secure the castle on Holy Island so as "to give signals to the ships from which they expected succours from abroad". The castle was sealed but only held by around six men. The brigantine Mary of the Tyne, ex France was anchored in the bay. The master, Lancelot Errington, went ashore on 10 October 1715 to ask Samuel Phillipson, the castle's Master Gunner who also served as the unit's barber, for a shave. The men knew each other and so this seemed entirely innocent. Errington established that only two soldiers (Phillipson and Farggison) and Phillipson's wife were actually in the castle, the rest of the garrison being off duty. Errington returned with his nephew later in the day claiming to have lost the key to his watch then pulled a pistol on Phillipson and ejected the three people. Forster was expected to send reinforcements to the castle but never did.

The following day Colonel Laton with a hundred troops arrived from Berwick and was joined by 50 of the islanders in retaking the castle. The Erringtons fled, were caught and imprisoned in the tollbooth at Berwick but tunnelled their way out and escaped back to Bamburgh. On 14 October two French ships signalled to the castle, but on receiving no reply withdrew.

The castle was refurbished in the Arts and Crafts style by Sir Edwin Lutyens for the editor of Country Life, Edward Hudson. Lutyens also designed the Holy Island War Memorial on the Heugh.

One of the most celebrated gardeners of modern times, Gertrude Jekyll (1843–1932), laid out a small walled garden just north of the castle in 1911. The castle, garden and nearby lime kilns are in the care of the National Trust and open to visitors.

=== Green Shiel ===
This monument on the north coast includes a farmstead dated to the early medieval period. The stone-built foundations of five rectangular buildings have been uncovered by excavation within the dune system. The settlement at Green Shiel is a rare example of an early medieval farmstead in Northumberland. There are no other known examples of stone-built farmsteads of this period in the region, and as such it is of particular importance. The settlement has been dated to the 9th century.

=== Navigational markers ===
Guile Point East Lighthouse
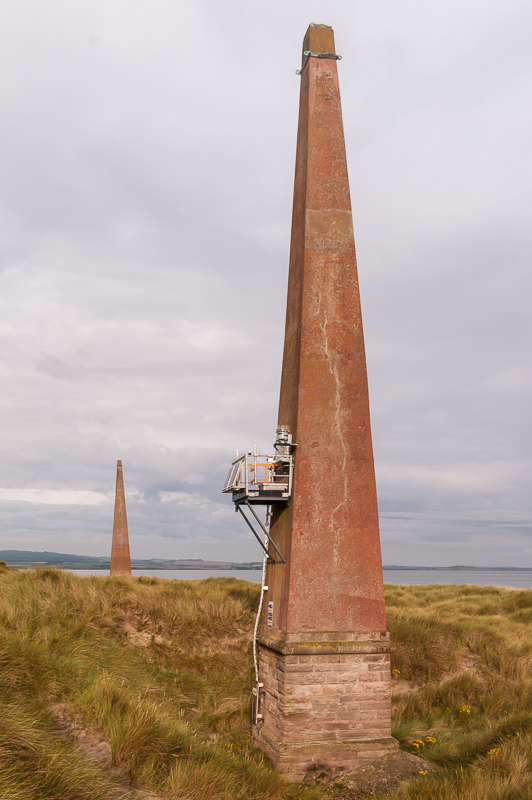
- Location: Old Law, Middleton, United Kingdom
- Coordinates: 55°42′N 1°48′W

Tower
- Constructed: 1826
- Designed by: John Dobson
- Construction: Unpainted square stone obelisk
- Height: 29 ft (8.8 m)
- Power source: solar power
- Operator: Trinity House (1995–), Newcastle-upon-Tyne Trinity House (1826–1995)

Light
- Focal height: 9 m (30 ft)
- Range: 4 nmi (7.4 km; 4.6 mi)
- Characteristic: Oc WRG 6s

Guile Point West mark
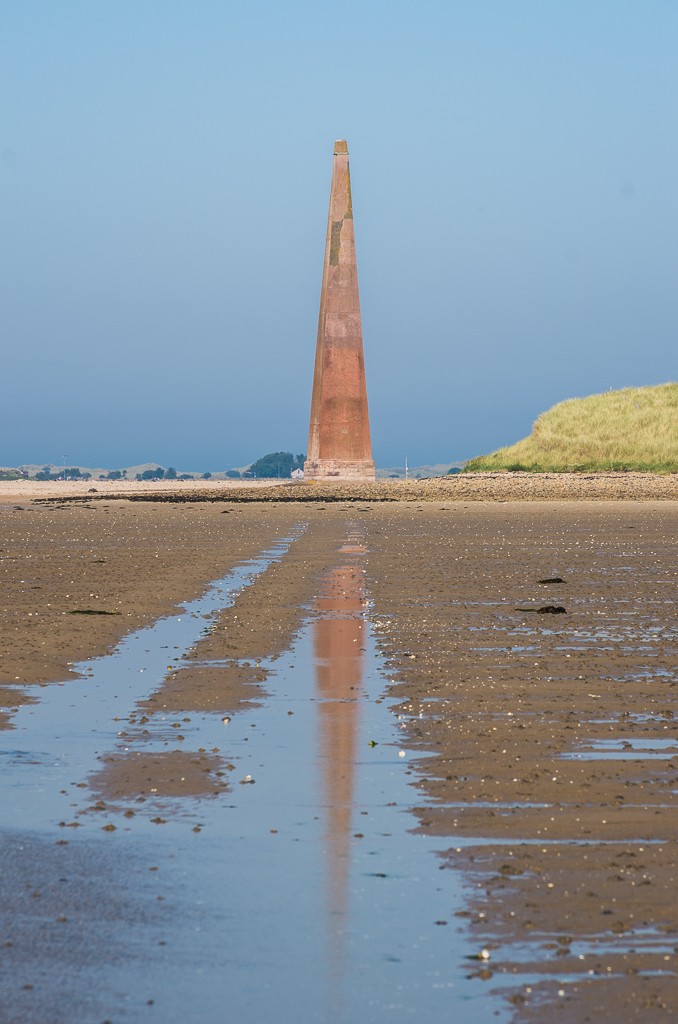
- Location: Old Law, Middleton, United Kingdom
- Coordinates: 55°39′29″N 1°47′42″W
- Constructed: 1826
- Designed by: John Dobson
- Construction: Unpainted square stone obelisk
- Height: 25 metres (82 ft)

Heugh Hill Lighthouse
- Location: Lindisfarne, Lindisfarne, Holy Island, Kingdom of Great Britain
- Coordinates: 55°40′06″N 1°47′59″W

Tower
- Constructed: 1826
- Height: 8 m (26 ft)
- Shape: quadrangular tower with black triangle daymark and light
- Power source: solar power
- Operator: Trinity House

Light
- Focal height: 24 m (79 ft)
- Range: 5 nmi (9.3 km; 5.8 mi)
- Characteristic: Oc WRG 6s

Trinity House maintains three beacons on or near the island, to guide vessels entering Holy Island Harbour: one is on Heugh Hill, the other two at Guile Point. Two of the three have navigation lights attached (and Trinity House classes them as 'lighthouses'). Until 1 November 1995 all three were operated by Newcastle-upon-Tyne Trinity House (a separate corporation, which formerly had responsibility for navigation marks along the coast from Berwick-upon-Tweed to Whitby), but on that day responsibility for marking the approach to the harbour was assumed by Trinity House of London.

Guile Point East and Guile Point West are two stone obelisks which function as leading marks, guiding vessels approaching the harbour from the east. The beacons, which stand on a small tidal island on the other side of the channel, were established in 1826 by Newcastle-upon-Tyne Trinity House (in whose ownership they remain). When aligned, they indicated the safe channel over a submerged bar. Since the early 1990s, a sector light has been fixed about one-third of the way up on the Guile Point East beacon.

The Heugh Hill Light is a metal framework tower with a black triangular day mark, situated on Heugh Hill (a ridge on the south edge of Lindisfarne). Prior to its installation, a wooden beacon with a triangle topmark had stood on the centre of Heugh Hill for many decades. When aligned with the church belfry (on a bearing of 310°), it indicated that the bar had been cleared and provided a line of approach into the harbour.

Nearby on Heugh Hill is a former coastguard station (recently refurbished and opened to the public as a viewing platform). An adjacent ruin is known as the Lantern Chapel; its origin is unknown, but the name may indicate an earlier navigation light on this site.

On the other side of the island, the Emmanuel Head daymark provides a visual navigational fix during daylight hours. It is a white brick pyramid, standing 35 feet (11 m) high, on Emmanuel Head at the north-eastern point of Lindisfarne. Built in 1810, it is said to be Britain's earliest purpose-built daymark.

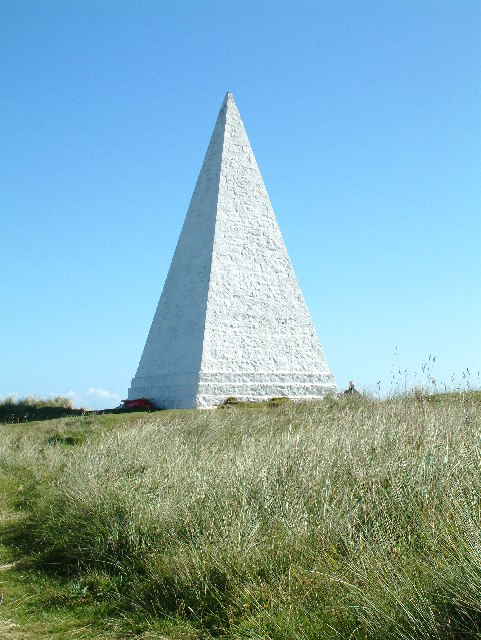
Emmanuel Head Daymark

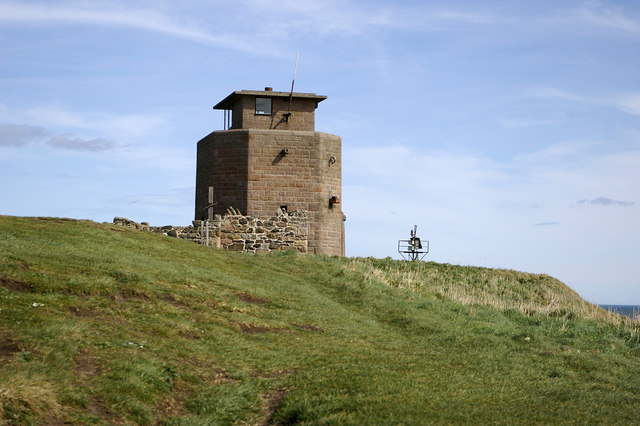
Public viewing platform and former coastguard station with remains of 'Lantern Chapel'

== Tourism ==
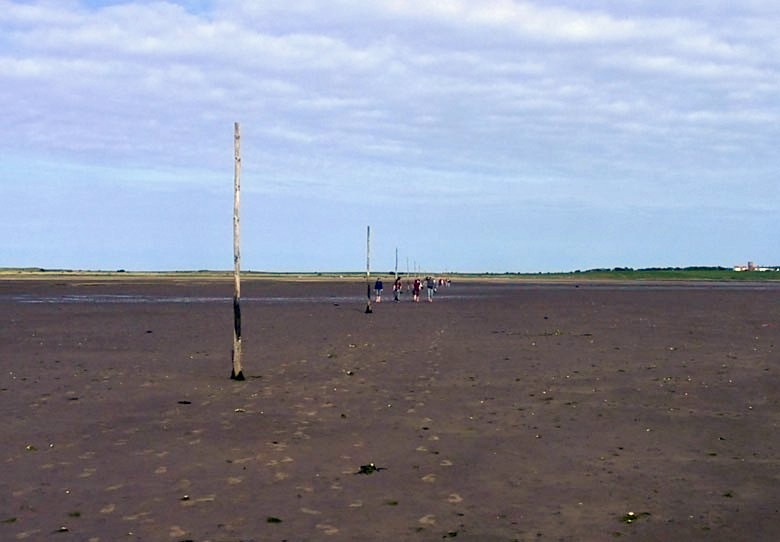
Tourists crossing Pilgrim's Way

Tourism grew steadily throughout the 20th century, and the isle of Lindisfarne became a popular destination for visitors. Those tourists staying on the island while it is cut off by the tide experience the island in a quieter state, as most day trippers leave before the tide rises. At low tide it is possible to walk across the sands following an ancient route known as the Pilgrims' Way (see the note about safety, above). This route is marked with posts and has refuge boxes for stranded walkers, just as the road has a refuge box for those who have left their crossing too late. The island is the eastern end point of the St Cuthbert's Way long distance path, and walkers on the Way can choose either the Pilgrims' Way or the modern causeway.

The isle of Lindisfarne is surrounded by the 8,750-acre (3,540-hectare) Lindisfarne National Nature Reserve which attracts bird-watchers to the tidal island. The island's prominent position and varied habitat make it particularly attractive to tired avian migrants, and as of 2016 330 bird species had been recorded on the island.

The island is within the Northumberland Coast National Landscape, an Area of Outstanding Natural Beauty. The ruined priory is in the care of English Heritage, which also runs a museum/visitor centre nearby.

It is possible to see old wooden boats turned upside down on the land, used as sheds. These upturned boats near the foreshore provided the inspiration for Spanish architect Enric Miralles's Scottish Parliament Building in Edinburgh.

== Media ==
Local news and television programmes are provided by BBC North East and Cumbria and ITV Tyne Tees. Television signals are received from Chatton transmitting station. Local radio stations are BBC Radio Newcastle, Capital North East, Heart North East, Smooth North East, Hits Radio North East, Greatest Hits Radio and Holy Island Radio, a community based station. The island is served by the local newspaper, Northumberland Gazette.

== Culture ==
J. M. W. Turner, Thomas Girtin and Charles Rennie Mackintosh all painted on Holy Island.

The island was featured on the television programme Seven Natural Wonders as one of the wonders of the north. The Lindisfarne Gospels have also featured on television among the Treasures of Britain. It also features in an ITV Tyne Tees programme Diary of an Island which started on 19 April 2007 and on a DVD of the same name.

=== Music ===
The English folk-rock band Lindisfarne takes its name from the island. The English musician James Blake wrote two electronica songs named after Lindisfarne, both appearing on his 2011 album. The rock band Iona had a song called Lindisfarne on their 1996 album Journey into the Morn.

The opening track "793 (Slaget om Lindisfarne)" on Norwegian metal band Enslaved's 1997 album Eld deals with the 793 raid from the Viking invaders' perspective.

The Muscle Shoals, Alabama based shoegaze duo Sister Ray Davies' 2025 album Holy Island (released by Sonic Cathedral) was inspired by Lindisfarne, with songs referencing names (such as Aidan) and events in the island's history, up to and including the 793 AD Viking raid.

The song "Altars On Fire", from German power metal band Powerwolf's 2023 album Interludium, is about the burning of the abbey during the 793 Viking raid from the English perspective.

=== In popular fiction ===
Most of LJ Ross's crime novel Holy Island (2015) is set on Lindisfarne. Much of Ann Cleeves's mystery novel The Rising Tide is also located here and was filmed on the island for the TV series Vera based on the lead character in Cleeves' novels, DCI Vera Stanhope as played by Brenda Blethyn. It is also mentioned as background in Anne Perry's novel A Question of Betrayal (2020).

The Viking raid appears in season one of the television series Vikings. A dramatised version of the first Viking raid on the island appears in the final episode of season 3 of the comedy series Norsemen, and another in the Big Finish Productions Doctor Who audio story Escape from Holy Island (2024), starring the Sixth Doctor and his companion Peri Brown.

Lindisfarne was the location for filming of director Roman Polanski's 1966 comedy thriller Cul-de-sac (starring Donald Pleasence, Françoise Dorléac, Lionel Stander and Jack MacGowran). Danny Boyle's film 28 Years Later (2025) is partly set on Lindisfarne – referencing its history as a fortified island – with extensive filming taking place there, including locals as extras. The island was the setting for season 1 episode 5 (2012) of Wolfblood, a supernatural teen drama from Children's BBC.

== Arms ==
Coat of arms of Holy Island Parish Council

Notes
Granted 10 June 1959 by Sir George Bellew (Garter) and Sir John Heaton-Armstrong (Clarenceux). Design negotiated with John Brooke-Little (Bluemantle).
Crest
A monk seated affrontée and habited in a saffron-coloured robe Proper behind the head a nimbus Or and holding in the hands an open book Gules garnished Gold.
Escutcheon
Barry wavy Argent and Azure a Pomeis ensigned with an ancient crown and charged throughout with a Celtic cross Or on a chief also Azure on a landscape a representation of the ruined priory of Lindisfarne Proper.
Motto
Ecce Ego Mitte Me (Here I Am, Send Me!)

== Sources ==
- Grundy, John (2022). History of Northumberland. Newcastle upon Tyne: Tyne Bridge Publishing. ISBN 9781838280970.
