= School Aycliffe =

Village in County Durham, England

Coordinates: 54.609°N 1.602°W

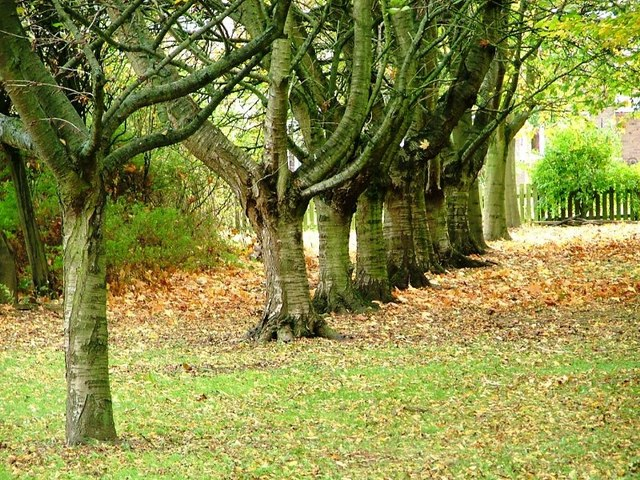

- Location within County Durham
- OS grid reference: NZ258237
- Civil parish: Great Aycliffe
- Unitary authority: County Durham
- Ceremonial county: Durham
- Region: North East
- Country: England
- Sovereign state: United Kingdom
- Post town: Darlington
- Postcode district: DL5
- Police: Durham
- Fire: County Durham and Darlington
- Ambulance: North East

School Aycliffe is a village and former civil parish, now in the parish of Great Aycliffe, in the County Durham district, in the ceremonial county of Durham, England. It is a short distance west of Newton Aycliffe, and east of Heighington. Its name derives from a Viking called Scula, who owned land in that part of South Durham.

School Aycliffe is split into two by School Aycliffe Lane. On the north side is the original village. It is under the remit of Durham County Council (between 1974 and 2009, it was part of the borough of Sedgefield), and part of the parish of Great Aycliffe. The School Aycliffe Wetlands is a wildlife habitat situated on the northern edge of the village.

On the southern side is a new housing estate, "The Chestnuts", under the remit of the Borough of Darlington and part of the parish of Heighington. The now-closed Aycliffe Hospital, a mental health facility, was located there before the estate was built. The father of comedian, writer and actor Mark Gatiss worked at the hospital, and it became the inspiration for a number of ideas used by Gatiss in the TV show The League Of Gentlemen.

== Civil parish ==
School Aycliffe was formerly a township in the parish of Heighington, from 1866 School Aycliffe was a civil parish in its own right, on 1 April 1946 the parish was abolished and merged with Heighington. In 1931 the parish had a population of 16.
