= Northern Cross (pilgrimage) =

Northern Cross is an annual, ecumenical, Christian cross-carrying, walking pilgrimage to Lindisfarne (Holy Island) that takes place at Easter. The pilgrimage was founded in 1976 by walkers from Student Cross seeking a new destination, who led a group of pilgrims on a walk from Penrith (near Carlisle) to Lindisfarne, taking it in turns to carry the Cross. The pilgrimage has grown over the decades and currently consists of up to seven different 'Legs' that start from different areas of the Scotland-England border region leading up to the celebration of the Easter Triduum. The Pilgrimage has been officially ecumenical since its start and welcomes all faiths and those of none, although it has a strong Christian flavour.

The act of the pilgrimage is considered a unique witness to the passion, death and resurrection of Christ, as carrying a cross is a symbolic act, which relives the road to Calvary, and reminds of the importance of Christ, and specifically Easter, both to the pilgrims taking part and those who watch it pass. Pilgrims are hosted along their way by the communities they pass through (Anglican, Catholic, Church of Scotland, Methodist and Baptist) and the walkers join in worship with them along the way. The pilgrimage is open to people of all ages, and all shades of Christianity.

For some, Northern Cross is said to give a chance to get away from the world, a retreat, to top-up their faith, and to share in a small Christian community for the week.

It has been featured in mainstream media on multiple occasions, notably on BBC Songs of Praise, and various journals and daily newspapers.

All the main legs walk for seven days, over a distance of approximately 70 to 120 miles. There are also usually two other legs: (1) a family group leg, based in one location during Holy Week, and which follows shorter routes suitable for young children and toddlers. and (2) an 'extreme' long distance leg which has in the past walked to Lindisfarne from locations as far distant as Iona, St Ninian's Bay (Dumfries), and St Andrews, over a longer period of up to two weeks. This extreme leg varies in route and method each year. All the participating leg groups meet at the Beal Sands tidal causeway on the morning of Good Friday and celebrate the Easter liturgy together on Lindisfarne over the Easter weekend.

The typical five main legs are known as:

- Melrose (starts walking from Melrose)
- Lanark (starts walking from Lanark)
- Haddington (starts walking from Haddington, south of Edinburgh)
- Carlisle (starts walking from Carlisle)
- Bellingham (starts walking from the village of Bellingham near Hexham)
