= Onlafbald and Scula =

Onlafbald (Note: Sometimes referred to as Onlafbald, Onalafball, Onlafbal, Onalafbald, and Onlafball. According to Benjamin Hudson, his name means "Onlaf the Bold". Another opinion is that the name is made up of the Old Norse byname Bǫllr, meaning "the rotund one".) and Scula (Old Norse: Skúli) were two early 10th-century Viking chieftains, notable for receiving lands through successful campaigning in what is now northern England. Onlafbald is also said to have been killed by the spirit of the 7th-century English saint Cuthbert of Lindisfarne, after he profaned the long-dead saint. The legacy of Scula is preserved in the place name of School Aycliffe, a village in County Durham, which is derived from his name (Old Norse: Skúli).

Following the Battle of Corbridge in about 918, the victorious Hiberno-Norse king Ragnall occupied lands between the River Tyne and the River Tees. Some of these lands had formerly been in the possession of an English noble named Ælfed, son of Brihtulf, who had received them from Cutheard, Bishop of Lindisfarne after he had fled Viking devastations in the west, to resettle on the eastern coast. (Note: Hudson gives Alfred's name as "Alfred, son of Birihtulfinc"; Harper-Bill gives it as "Ælfed, son of Brihtulf".) Ragnall divided these new acquisitions between two of his followers, Scula and Onlafbald. Scula received a massive tract of land which comprised the estates from Castle Eden to Billingham; and Onlafbald received a similarly large tract, which included the rest from Eden to the River Wear. These lands lie on the coast, and it has been suggested that the two men were also granted the surrounding interior-lands as well.

Onlafbald is said to have uttered profane blasphemies against the English saint Cuthbert of Lindisfarne (d.687); after which the spirit of the saint miraculously tortured the pagan chieftain until he acknowledged the power of the Christian god and died on the spot. In some accounts he is said to have invoked the power of his own gods, namely Thor and Odin.

== See also ==
- Historia de Sancto Cuthberto, an historical account of the bishopric of St Cuthbert which mentions Onlafbald and Scula
