= List of lost settlements in Northamptonshire =

This list is of deserted medieval villages (DMVs), "shrunken" villages and other settlements known to have been "lost" or significantly reduced in size over the centuries. There are estimated to be as many as 3,000 DMVs in England alone. (Grid references are given, where known.)

- Achurch
- Althorp SP678648
- Appletree
- Armston
- Astwell
- Astwick SP570343
- Badsaddle SP833730
- Barford SP853828
- Boughton SP901816
- Braunston Cleves or Fawcliff SP544682
- Braunstonbury SP532655
- Brime
- Brockhall
- Burghley
- Calme
- Caswell
- Canons Ashby (Ascebi) SP576507
- Cotes
- Coton SP673717
- Cotton near Grendon SP874610
- Cotton Mill
- Cotton Mallows
- Chilcote SP658747
- Churchfield
- Church Charwelton SP544554
- Doddington Thorpe SP871656
- Downtown SP615801
- Eaglethorpe
- Eastern Neston
- Edgcote
- Elmington in Ashton
- Elmington in Tansor
- Elkington SP626762
- Falcutt
- Fawsley SP561566
- Foscote
- Faxton SP783751
- Field Burcote
- Foxley
- Furtho
- Glassthorpe SP662617
- Glendon SP847814
- Great Purston
- Hale
- Holdenby SP692675
- Horton SP821542
- Hothorpe SP667852
- Kelmarsh SP743794
- Kingsthorpe
- Kirby SP925925
- Kirby in Blakesley
- Kirby in Gretton
- Knuston SP938662
- Lilford
- Little Creaton SP712716
- Little Newton SP887833
- Little Oxendon SP733845
- Lolham
- Lower Catesby SP515597
- Mawsley SP805763
- Milton
- Murcott SP620677
- Muscott SP627633
- Nether Catesby
- Newbottle SP777815
- Newbottle in Harrington
- Nobold SP695821
- Nobottle
- Nunton
- Papley
- Perio
- Pipewell SP839857
- Potcote
- Preston Deanery SP787555
- Onley SP511707
- Overstone SP806657
- Rushton Saint Peter SP837827
- Seawell
- Sibberton
- Silsworth SP617707
- Snorscomb SP598561
- Stanford SP589788
- Steane
- Strixton SP902617
- Stuchbury
- Sulby SP653816
- Thorpe SP865630
- Thorpe Lubenham
- Thrupp SP598650
- Torpel
- Trafford
- Upper Catesby SP528594
- Upton
- Walcot
- Walton
- Winwick SP627737
- Wolfhampcote SP533656
- Woodcroft
- Wothorpe
- Wythmail SP842721
