= Catesby =

Catesby may refer to:

== Places ==
- Catesby, Northamptonshire, England, a civil parish
- Catesby, Oklahoma, United States, an unincorporated community

== People ==
- Catesby (surname)
- Catesby ap Roger Jones (1821–1877), American Civil War naval commander
- R. Catesby Taliaferro (1907–1989), American mathematician, science historian, classical philologist, philosopher and translator of ancient Greek and Latin works
- Robert Catesby (1572-1605), English Catholic and leader of the 1605 Gunpowder Plot.
- William Catesby (1450-1485), principal councillor to Richard III of England
- Mark Catesby (1683–1749) English naturalist

== See also ==
- Lower Catesby and Upper Catesby, two hamlets in Catesby, Northamptonshire
- Catesby Priory, in Lower Catesby, a former priory of Cistercian nuns
- Catesby Tunnel, a disused railway tunnel in Northamptonshire
- Catesby's snail-eater, a species of non-venomous snake
- Sistrurus miliarius, a species of venomous snake also known as Catesby's small snake
