= Catesby Priory =

Priory of Cistercian nuns in England

- Location within Northamptonshire

Monastery information
- Order: Cistercian
- Established: 1175
- Disestablished: 1536
- Diocese: Lincoln
- Controlled churches: Basford, Canons Ashby, Catesby, Hellidon

People
- Founder: Robert de Esseby
- Important associated figures: Margaret and Edmund Rich

Site
- Location: Lower Catesby, Northamptonshire, England
- Coordinates: 52.2316°N 1.2474°W
- Grid reference: SP515595
- Visible remains: earthworks

Catesby Priory was a priory of Cistercian nuns at Lower Catesby, Northamptonshire, England. It was founded in about 1175 and dissolved in 1536.

== History ==
Robert de Esseby founded Catesby Priory in about 1175. He endowed it with Catesby parish church, land in the parish at Lower Catesby, Upper Catesby and Newbold, the chapelry of Hellidon, the parish of Canons Ashby and that of Basford, Nottinghamshire, and lands and other properties in each parish. In 1229 Henry III mandated Hugh de Neville to allow the prioress timber from the forest of Silverstone in the Royal park to build her church.

In the 1230s Edmund of Abingdon, Archbishop of Canterbury, committed his sisters Margaret and Alice to be nuns at the priory. On his death in 1240 Edmund left to his elder sister Margaret his archiepiscopal pall and a silver tablet bearing a figure of Christ. Miracles were attributed to her brother's relics, and this contributed to his canonization in 1247. An altar in the priory church was dedicated to Edmund and became a place of pilgrimage. Margaret Rich was elected prioress in 1245 and served until her death in 1257. The contemporary chronicler Matthew Paris wrote that Margaret was "a woman of great holiness, through whose distinguished merits miracles have been made gloriously manifest".

In 1267 William Maudit, 8th Earl of Warwick died and was buried in Westminster Abbey, but his heart was buried at Catesby Priory. In 1279 a Henry de Erdington granted Catesby priory the advowson of Yardley, which was then in Worcestershire. However, this was disputed and shortly afterwards Yardley church was granted to Merevale Abbey in Warwickshire. In 1268 there had apparently been a murder in the prior, the murderer being William de Ashby. By 1290–91 Catesby Priory held the park at Westbury, Buckinghamshire. The claim was disputed but the case was ruled in the priory's favour.

Early in the 14th century there was building work at the priory. John Dalderby, Bishop of Lincoln, granted indulgences to benefactors who helped to rebuild the priory church in 1301 and to persons who helped to repave the cloister and priory house in 1312. In 1310 religious houses in Northamptonshire including Catesby were required to contribute food to one of Edward II's unsuccessful military campaigns against Scotland. However, from 1315 to 1322 the same king granted the priory a number of tax exemptions.

In the early 15th century the priory was recorded as earning a large income from wool. Then in 1491 the prioress had about 60 people evicted and their 14 houses demolished in "Catesby", and had their land enclosed and converted from arable to sheep pasture. It is not clear whether the evictions were at Lower or Upper Catesby or at Newbold. In 1517–18 about 60 people were said to have been evicted from "Catesby", but again it is not clear where in the parish they had lived.

== Dissolution ==
In September 1535, after Parliament passed the Suppression of Religious Houses Act 1535, Sir John Tregonwell, principal agent for Thomas Cromwell, reported of Catesby Priory that "The prioress and sisters are free from suspicion". In May 1536 the local commissioners for suppressing religious houses went further, reporting:

Which house of Catesby we founde in very perfect order, the prioress a sure, wyse, discrete, and very religious woman with ix nunnys under her obedyencye, as religious and devoute and as good obedyencye as we have in tyme past seen or be lyke shall see. The seid house standyth in suche a quarter muche to the releff of the kynges people and his grace's pore subjectes their lykewyse much relieved. Only the reporte of dyvers worshyppfulles were thereunto adjoining us; of alle other yt ys to us openly declared. Wherefore yf yt should please the kynges highnesses to have any remorse that any suche religious house shall stande, we thinke his grace cannot appoynt any house more mete to share his most gracious charitie and pity on than on the said house of Catesby. Further, ye shall understand that as to her bounden dewtye towards the kynges highness in this his affayres, also for discrete entertainment of us his commyssioners and our company, we have not found nor belyke shall fynde any such of more dyscrecion.

The last prioress, Joyce Bekeley, offered to buy the priory from King Henry VIII for 2,000 marks and to give Cromwell 100 marks to buy a gelding. The King was unmoved, and ordered the commissioners to suppress the priory, which they did before the end of 1536. Bekeley was granted a pension of £20, her nine nuns and 26 dependants were evicted, all the priory's furnishings were seized, two hand-bells were broken up for scrap, and the lead from the roofs of the priory church and buildings was taken and sold for scrap.

Part of the monastery property was sold by the Crown to Lawrence Washington, a wool merchant of Northamptonshire on March 10, 1539, whose descendants include the first American president George Washington.

== Catesby House ==
In 1537 the Crown sold the remains of the priory to John Onley, who had at least part of the building turned into his family mansion. Early in the 17th century it passed from the Onley family to a family called Parkhurst. An engraving made in about 1720 and drawings made in 1844 suggest a 16th-century house arranged around a central courtyard and a symmetrical west front rebuilt about 1700, with a very formal garden around the house and extending to the east of it. The central courtyard could have been derived from the priory courtyard. In 1863 the house was demolished and a new Catesby House and parish church were built.

One of the garden's formal ponds survives. There are earthworks, many of them rectilinear, indicating walls and further formal ponds. It is not entirely clear which walls are from the house and which are from the priory.

== Sources ==
- RCHME, ed. (1981). "Catesby". An Inventory of the Historical Monuments in the County of Northamptonshire. Vol. 3 – Archaeological sites in North-West Northamptonshire. London: Royal Commission on the Historical Monuments of England. pp. 37–43.
- Serjeantson, R.M.; Adkins, W.R.D., eds. (1906). "The Priory of Catesby". A History of the County of Northampton. Victoria County History. Vol. 2. Archibald Constable & Co. pp. 121–125.
