= Charwelton railway station =

Former railway station in Northamptonshire, England

Coordinates: 52.2012°N 1.2164°W

Charwelton
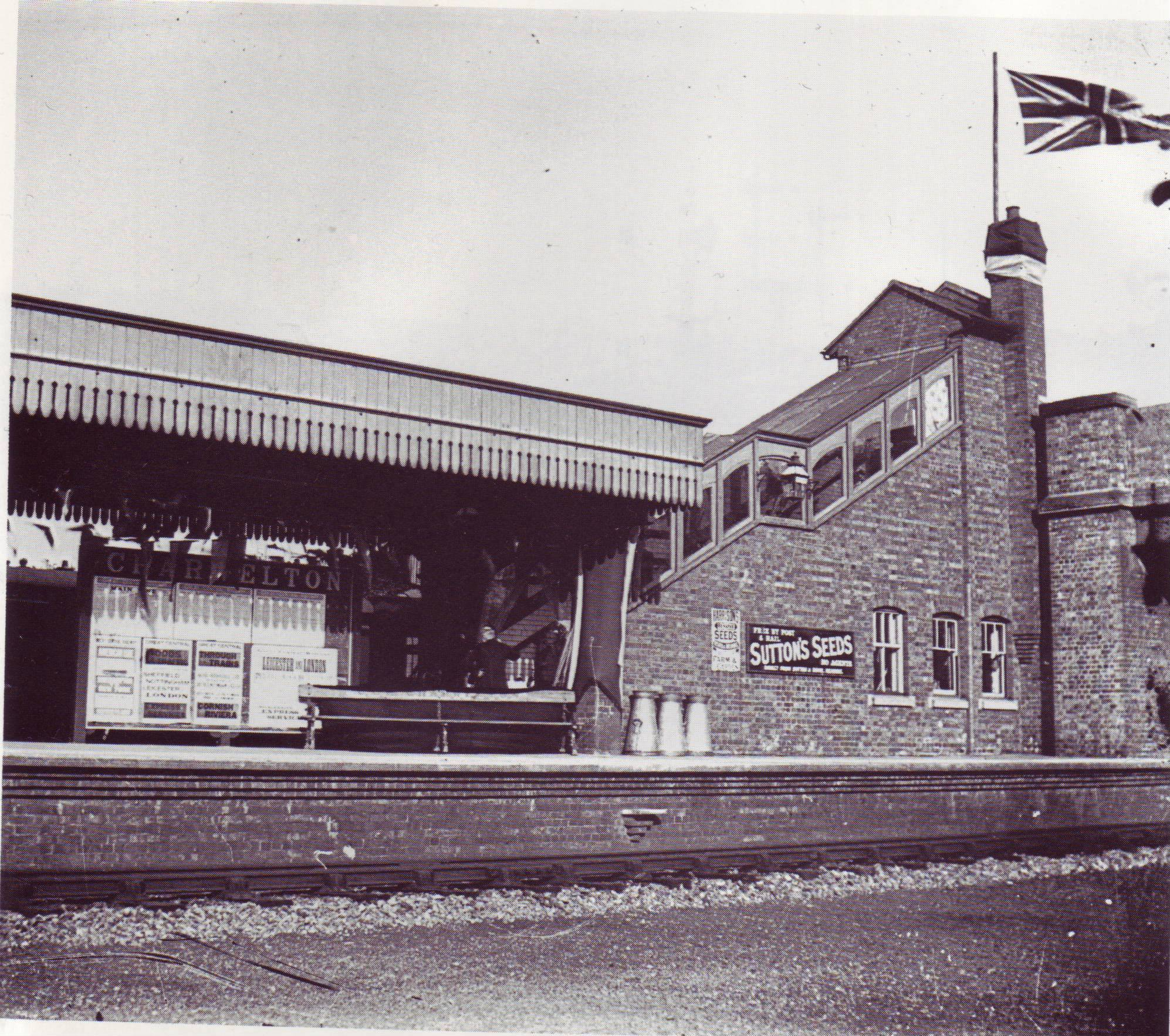
- Charwelton station in 1909 during a visit by the Royal Train

General information
- Location: Charwelton, West Northamptonshire; England
- Grid reference: SP536560
- Platforms: 2

Other information
- Status: Disused

History
- Original company: Great Central Railway
- Pre-grouping: Great Central Railway
- Post-grouping: London and North Eastern Railway; London Midland Region of British Railways

Key dates
- 15 March 1899: Opened
- 1917: Ironstone railway opened
- 1961: Ironstone railway closed
- 4 March 1963: Closed
Location

Charwelton railway station was a station at Charwelton in Northamptonshire on the former Great Central Railway main line, the last main line to be built from the Northern England to London. The station opened with the line on 15 March 1899.

== Location and opening ==
The station was one of the standard island platform design typical of the London Extension, and here it was the more common "cutting" type reached from a roadway (the Banbury to Daventry road, now classified A361, formerly the B4036), that crossed the line. Just to the south were Charwelton Watertroughs, while to the north is the 2,997-yard (2.7 km) Catesby Tunnel.

== Royal visit ==
In May 1905 the Duchess of Albany visited her lady-in-waiting, Lady Knightley, at Fawsley Hall. The princess travelled by rail to Charwelton station, where the children of Charwelton were turned out in their best clothes and waving Union Flags to welcome her.

== Ironstone railway ==
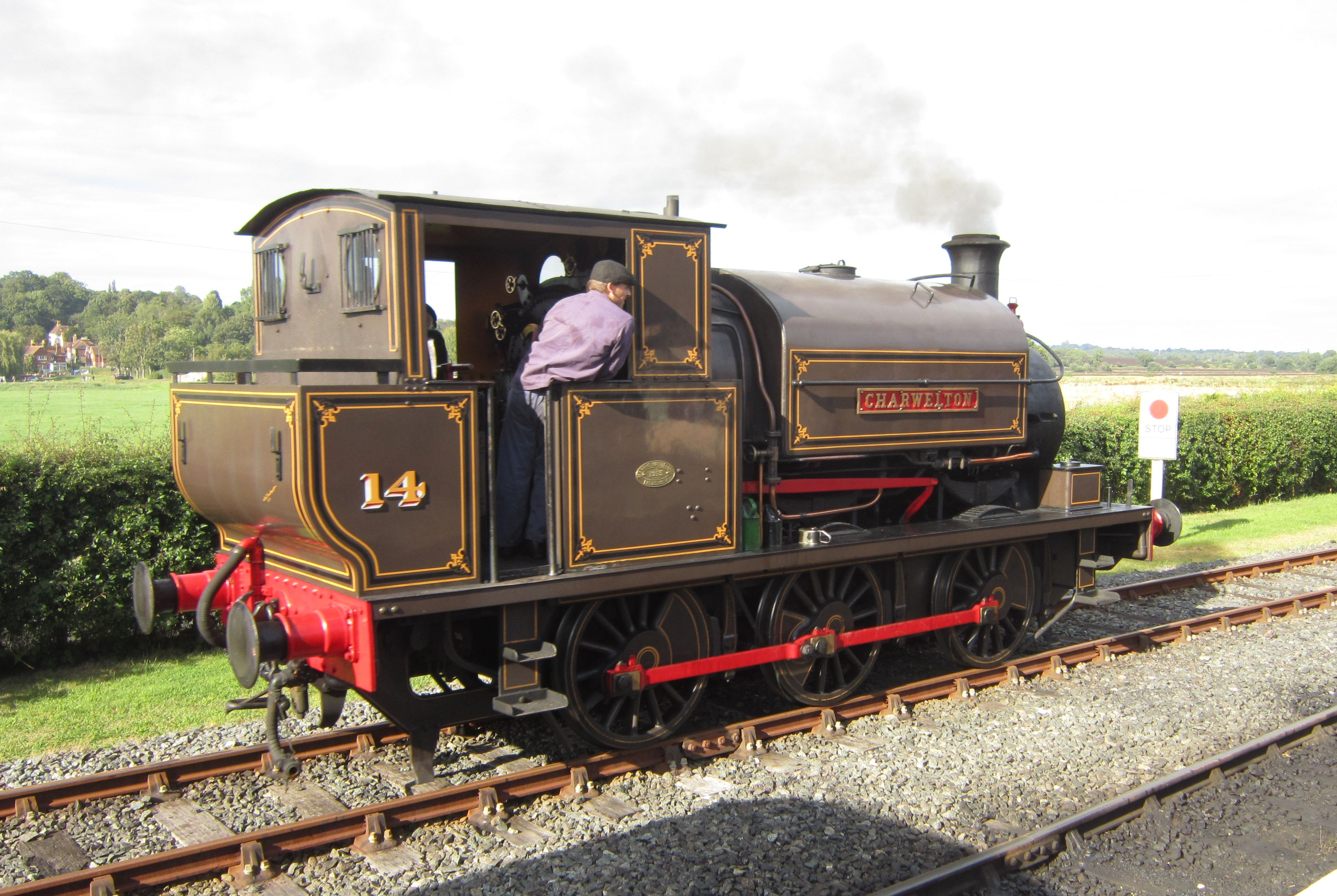
The steam locomotive Charwelton pulled ironstone trains from a quarry south of Hellidon to Charwelton station from 1917 until 1942

In 1917 the Park Gate Iron and Steel Company, based at Parkgate near Rotherham, South Yorkshire, opened an ironstone quarry 0.5 miles (800 m) south of the nearby village of Hellidon, and had a 1.5-mile (2 km) standard gauge mineral railway built to bring the stone to the main line.

Quarrying ceased in June 1933 but the Ministry of Supply ordered its resumption in May 1941. It ceased again in October 1945, but was resumed yet again in May 1951. At its peak Charwelton goods yard was busy with up to 200 wagons stabled in its sidings at any one time. As late as 1961 a new quarry was opened at Hellidon, but this proved less successful and so both quarry and line closed on 18 November that same year, the branch being dismantled in June 1963 and the sidings at Charwelton following in 1964.

A steam locomotive called Charwelton was built for the line in 1917, worked it until 1942, and is now preserved on the Kent and East Sussex Railway.

== Closure ==
Charwelton station closed to passengers and goods on 4 March 1963, the line itself on 5 September 1966. The station buildings had already gone before the line closed, though the platform remained until the mid-1980s as so – more critically – did the road bridge. This became something of a traffic hazard owing to its steep approaches, a sharp kink in the road at the apex on the west side, and poor visibility. In 1985 the bridge was demolished and the road straightened and lowered. The platform was removed at the same time. The road now cuts across the site of the platform roughly level with the "Charwelton" name-sign in the 1909 photograph above right.

== Route ==
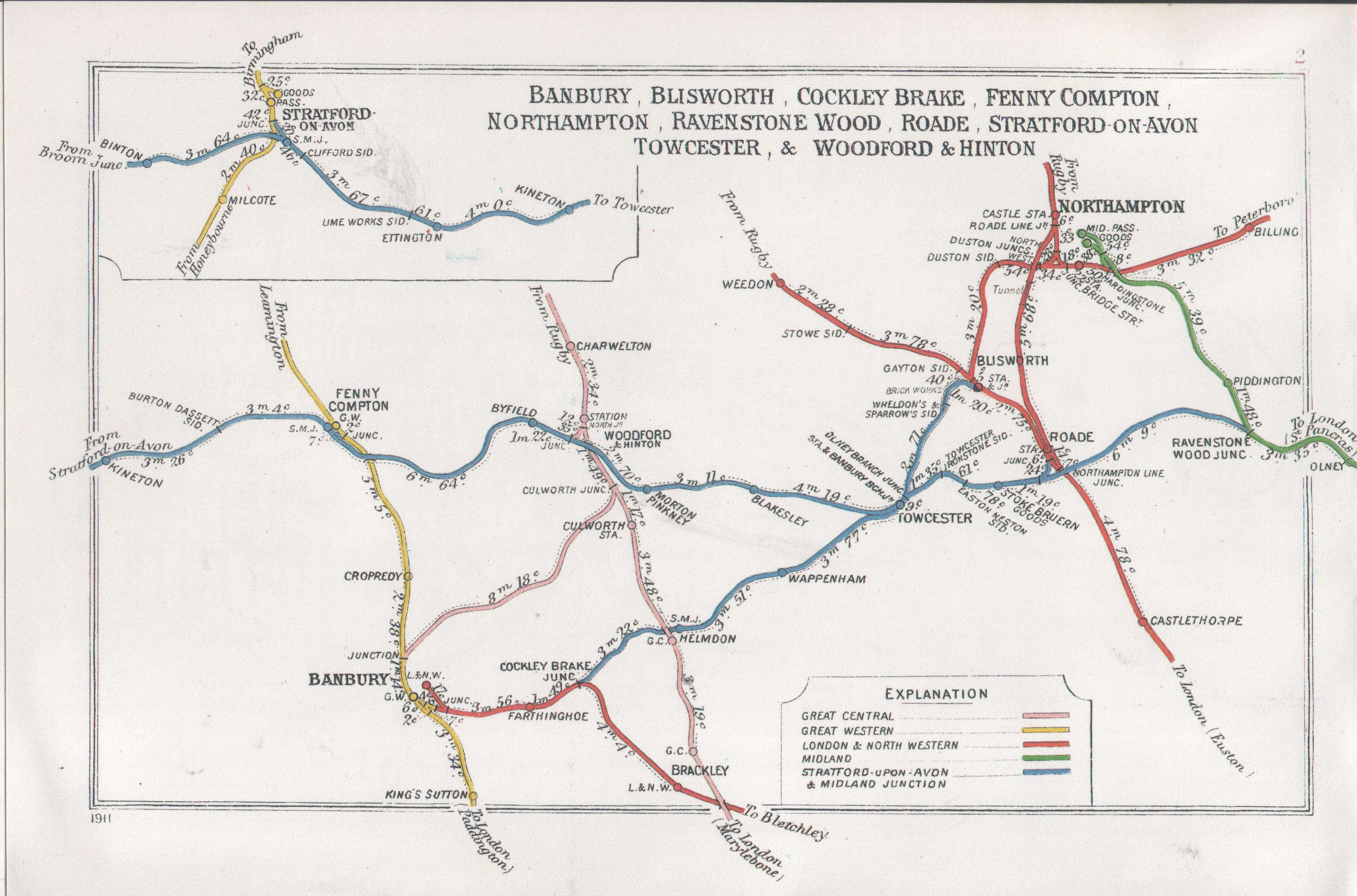
A 1911 Railway Clearing House map of railways in the vicinity of Charwelton (upper centre, in pink)

Preceding station	Disused railways	Following station
Woodford Halse; Line and station closed	Great Central Railway; London Extension	Braunston and Willoughby; Line and station closed

== See also ==
- The Reshaping of British Railways
