= G. H. Dury =

English hydrologist and author (1916–1996)

George Harry Dury (11 September 1916 – 4 October 1996) was an English geographer and hydrologist, who devised a model showing the relations between river discharge and other stream variables. His most widely read book was The Face of the Earth (1959).

== Life ==
Dury was born at Hellidon, near Daventry, Northamptonshire, the son of Harry Dury (1879–1961), an agricultural labourer then serving in the Royal West Surrey Regiment, and his wife, Harriett Emma, née Colledge (1882–1959). He attended the grammar school in Daventry, before taking a BA (1937) and a teacher's diploma (1939) as an external student of the University of London. In 1937 he married Ina Gertrude Newton (1916–2005), daughter of George Lionel Newton, army pensioner, of Hertford Heath, Hertfordshire. They had a daughter, Helen.

While teaching at Elizabeth College, Guernsey, in 1939, Dury and his family were evacuated before the German occupation. He was commissioned in the Royal Air Force in 1941 and assigned to photographic mapping. His mapping of Guernsey served also for his London University MA degree. His first post-war job was as a lecturer in geology and geography at Enfield Technical College in 1946–48. He then became a geography lecturer at Birkbeck College, University of London (1949–62). Having retired to Risby near Bury St Edmunds, Suffolk, he died at the West Suffolk Hospital there in 1996.

== Research ==
Dury's model is an extension of the Bradshaw model, which shows how river characteristics change from the upper course to the lower course of a river. Dury used a line graph and a logarithmic scale, plotting the discharge along the x-axis and the other stream variables along the y-axis. The latter included depth, width, velocity, slope (gradient) and friction (Manning formula).

Dury's work on quantitative fluvial geomorphology led to a temporary stay with the United States Geological Survey in 1960–1961 and co-authorship of the influential Fluvial Processes in Geomorphology (with Luna B. Leopold, M. Gordon Wolman, and John Miller, 1964). Dury's most widely read book was The Face of the Earth (1959), published by Penguin Books.

== See also ==
- List of rivers by average discharge
