= Everdon =

Village in Northamptonshire, England

Coordinates: 52.28°N 1.16°W

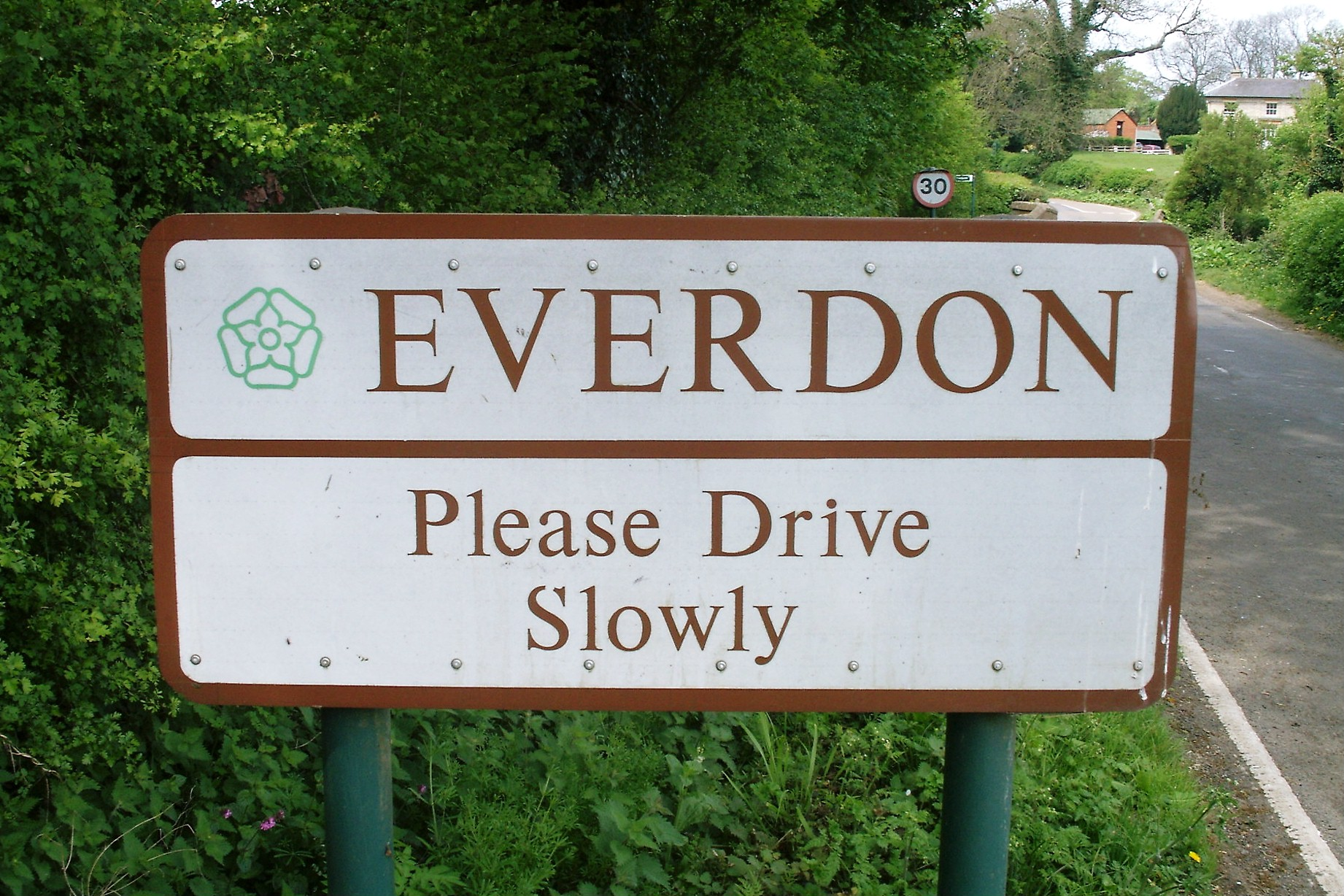
- Entering Everdon Village

- Location within Northamptonshire
- Population: 356 (2011)
- OS grid reference: SP595575
- Unitary authority: West Northamptonshire
- Ceremonial county: Northamptonshire
- Region: East Midlands
- Country: England
- Sovereign state: United Kingdom
- Post town: Daventry
- Postcode district: NN11
- Dialling code: 01327
- Police: Northamptonshire
- Fire: Northamptonshire
- Ambulance: East Midlands

Everdon is a village in West Northamptonshire in England, some 3 miles (4.8 km) south of Daventry. The population of the civil parish (including Little Everdon) at the 2011 census was 356.

Nearby, The Stubbs is a wood belonging to the Woodland Trust, a UK conservation charity. The village's former school is now an activities centre for conservation studies.

To the north of Everdon is the hamlet of Little Everdon and to its south lies the shrunken village of Snorscombe.

== History ==
The villages name means 'Wild boar hill'.

Domesday entry: Bishop of Bayeux's fief. William held half a hide in Great Everdon. Soke of land lies in Fawsley. Land for 1 plough. 2 villains and 2 bordars and 6 acres (24,000 m^{2}) of meadow.

In the Middle Ages, Everdon Priory was a small Benedictine priory, located at the eastern end of the village, close to a group of fish pools, which are still extant. It was a daughter house of the abbey of Bernay, in Normandy, and was granted lordship of the manor of Everdon. Like most alien priories, it was dissolved in 1415 under an act of Parliament of Henry V. In 1440 Henry VI granted the property of the priory to the newly founded Eton College, which established a manor house on the site. A junior branch of the Spencer family from Badby took up the lease of the Eton College Manor house around 1500. The manor of Everdon should not be confused with the neighbouring manor of Little Everdon, where the Cluniac monks of Daventry Priory had a mill and land.

Everdon Inclosure Act 1764
- Act of Parliament
- Parliament of Great Britain
- Long title: An Act for dividing and enclosing the Common Fields, Common Pastures, Common Meadows, Common Grounds, and Waste Grounds, of and in the Manor and Parish of Everdon, otherwise Great Everdon, and Little Everdon, in the County of Northampton.
- Citation: 4 Geo. 3. c. 43 Pr.
- Territorial extent: Great Britain

Dates
- Royal assent: 5 April 1764
- Commencement: 15 November 1763 (Note: Start of session.)

Status: Current legislation

The land was enclosed by the Everdon Inclosure Act 1764 (4 Geo. 3. c. 43 Pr.):

1801: 111 houses, 585 inhabitants
1811: 116 houses, 578 inhabitants
1821: 122 houses, 640 inhabitants

A charity school was established in Everdon in 1813, and in the same year an independent meeting house opened.

== Everdon Stubbs ==
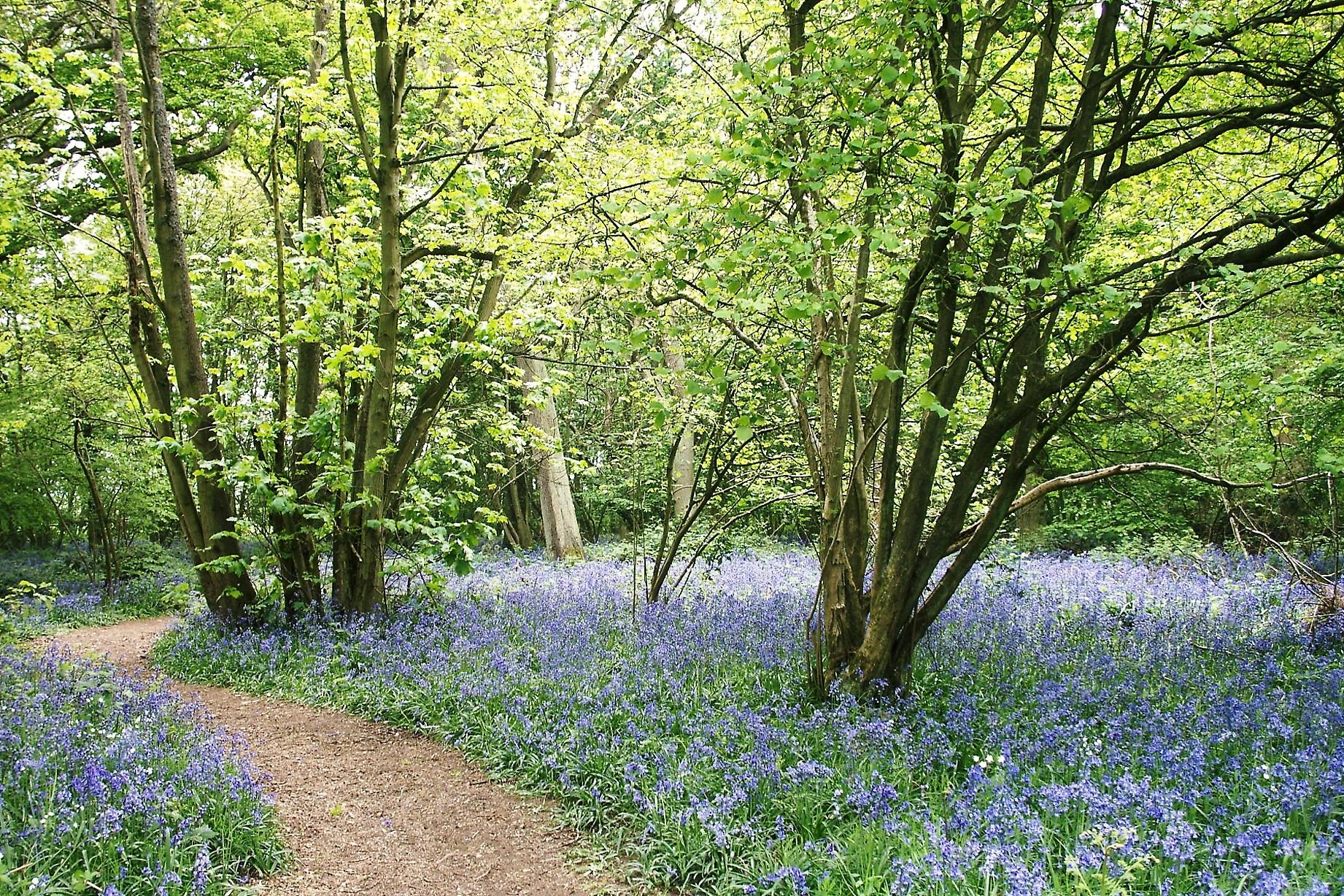
Everdon Stubbs' Bluebells in full bloom

Everdon Stubbs is a deciduous woodland covering an area of approximately 100 acres (0.40 km^{2}) and was once a famous hunting covert. The land now covered by the woods was originally grazing land for Wild Boar, through which Everdon gets its name (from Old English eofer-dūn'boar hill').

In the spring the area is covered with its famous carpet of bluebells, extremely well known throughout the county. Everdon Stubbs is currently open to the public and has conservation work taking place on an ad-hoc basis.

== St. Mary's Church ==
Located at the centre of the village, Saint Mary's church dates from the 14th century, and was built in the decorated style. It has been suggested that an earlier structure may have sat at this site prior to the current building. The list of incumbents reveals that a rector, Eias Capellinus de Everdone, was appointed in 1218 and the font certainly predates the current church.

Local ironstone was used in the construction of the church, and it is believed that the Bernay Monks were involved in the work, importing their own stonemason from France to complete the work. The parts of the building still visible, which date from the 14th century, include the north doorway, the north aisle and east windows, which are detailed with unusual tracery.

Some say that it was the churchyard of St Mary's, and not that of the Church of St Giles, Stoke Poges, that was the inspiration for Thomas Gray's famous elegy "In an English Churchyard". This theory suggested by Rev. H. Cavalier, the rector of Great Brington in 1926, is based on observations comparing the two churchyards and the lines in the poem.

== Village events ==
The village has a very strong community spirit, with a number of events taking place on a yearly basis, one of which is the Grand Fete, usually held on the last bank holiday Monday in August. In more recent times, the Everdon Bonfire and Fireworks party, which began in 2006, has become a very successful event, raising funds for the church restoration fund.

To coincide with the bluebells of Everdon Stubbs in the spring, a team of village residents host the 'Bluebell Teas' in the village hall, with the hope that people visiting the woods will drop by.
