= Little Everdon =

Hamlet in Northamptonshire, England

Coordinates: 52.2182°N 1.1309°W

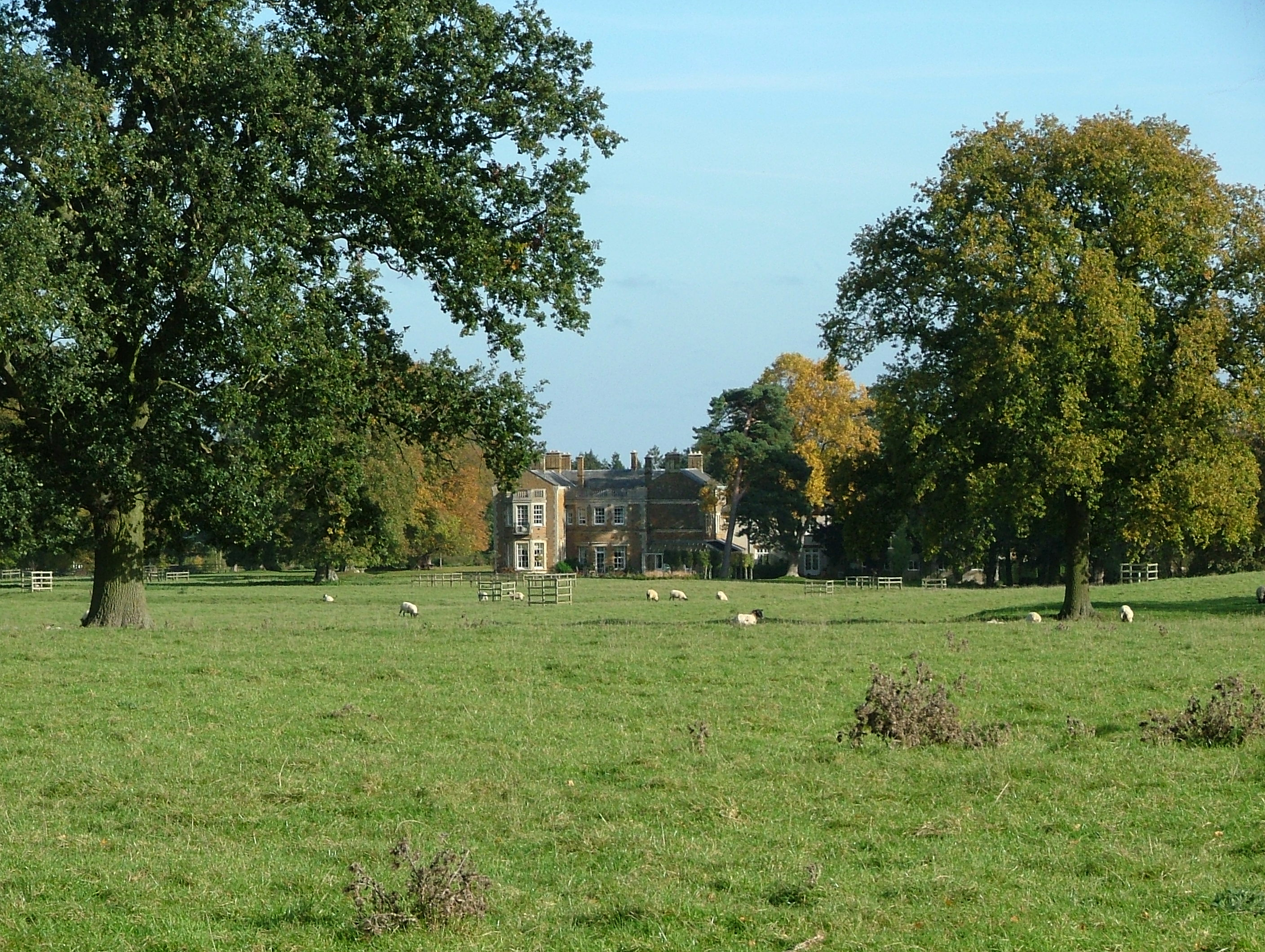
- Little Everdon Hall (2006)

- Location within Northamptonshire
- OS grid reference: SP594581
  - London: 64.45 mi (103.72 km)
- Unitary authority: West Northamptonshire
- Ceremonial county: Northamptonshire
- Region: East Midlands
- Country: England
- Sovereign state: United Kingdom
- Post town: Daventry
- Postcode district: NN11
- Dialling code: 01327
- Police: Northamptonshire
- Fire: Northamptonshire
- Ambulance: East Midlands
- UK Parliament: Daventry

Little Everdon is a small hamlet in the civil parish of Everdon in the county of Northamptonshire, England that lies approximately 2.96 miles (4.76 km) southeast of the town of Daventry. Lying on the Nene Way long-distance footpath, its parkland, large stone houses and manor house 'Everdon Hall' are typical of English countryside. The hamlet's name means 'Wild boar hill'. The hamlet is situated 1 mile (1.6 km) north of the parish village of Everdon which is situated between the village of Preston Capes 2.35 miles (3.78 km) to the southwest and Weedon Bec 2.3 miles (3.7 km) to the northeast.

== Sport and leisure ==
Everdon Hall was once home to one of the most prestigious cricket grounds in Northamptonshire. Established in 1901, the ground was used only intermittently until its restoration in 1950 by Richard Henry Hawkins. At its peak, the venue hosted around 30 matches per season, primarily on Sundays with occasional midweek fixtures, and attracted a number of notable England and international players. Cricket activity at the ground ceased following Hawkins's death in the late summer of 1997.
