= Church Charwelton (lost settlement) =

- Lost Settlement
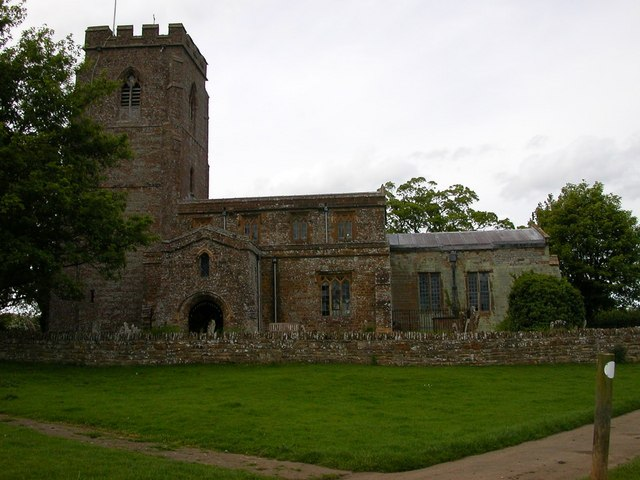
- The isolated church

- Church Charwelton within Northamptonshire
- Coordinates: 52°11′43″N 1°12′16″W
- Country: England
- State: Northamptonshire
- Region: East Midlands
- District: Daventry
- Municipality: Charwelton
- Map Ref: SP544554

The lost village of Church Charwelton lies south-east of the village of Charwelton in the English county of Northamptonshire. Its site is on the north-east bank of the River Cherwell. The Jurassic Way long-distance footpath passes across the site.

== History ==
It has been supposed that Church Charwelton was deserted in the 15th century at the time of the Wars of the Roses but in fact it is far more likely that the settlement's depopulation was due to enclosure and the introduction of sheep. The land was purchased by Thomas Andrews in 1417 and by the year 1547 records show that Thomas Andrew’s grandson, also Thomas, kept 1,200 sheep on the site of the settlement. Another part was owned by the Knightley family of Fawsley who also kept 300 sheep on the land. It is recorded that the whole site had been abandoned by 1847. The parish church of Charwelton still stands in the vicinity of the lost settlement and is isolated from today's village of Charwelton.

== The Site ==
The earthwork remains can be seen to the south and south-east side of the parish church. The most noticeable feature is a hollow way that runs from north to south from the river Cherwell up to the west of the church. On either side of this hollow way can be made out closes but most have been damaged by later agricultural activities. At the north end of the hollow way the definite site of a dwelling can be made out. There are also several remains of medieval ponds which can be distinguished around the site.
