= Althorp (lost settlement) =

Lost village in Northamptonshire, England

- Lost settlement
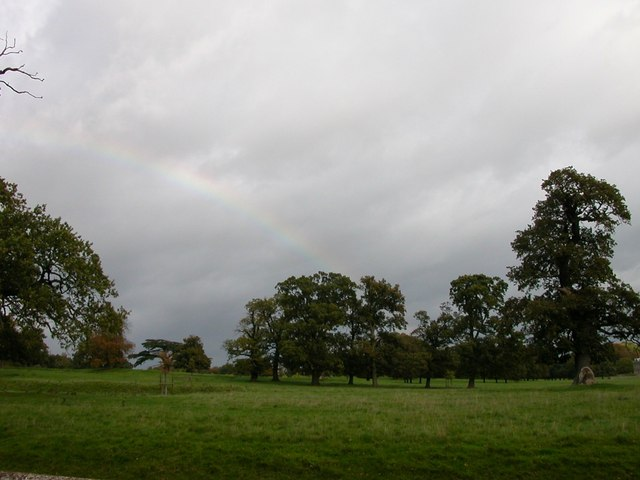
- Grounds of the park where once the village stood

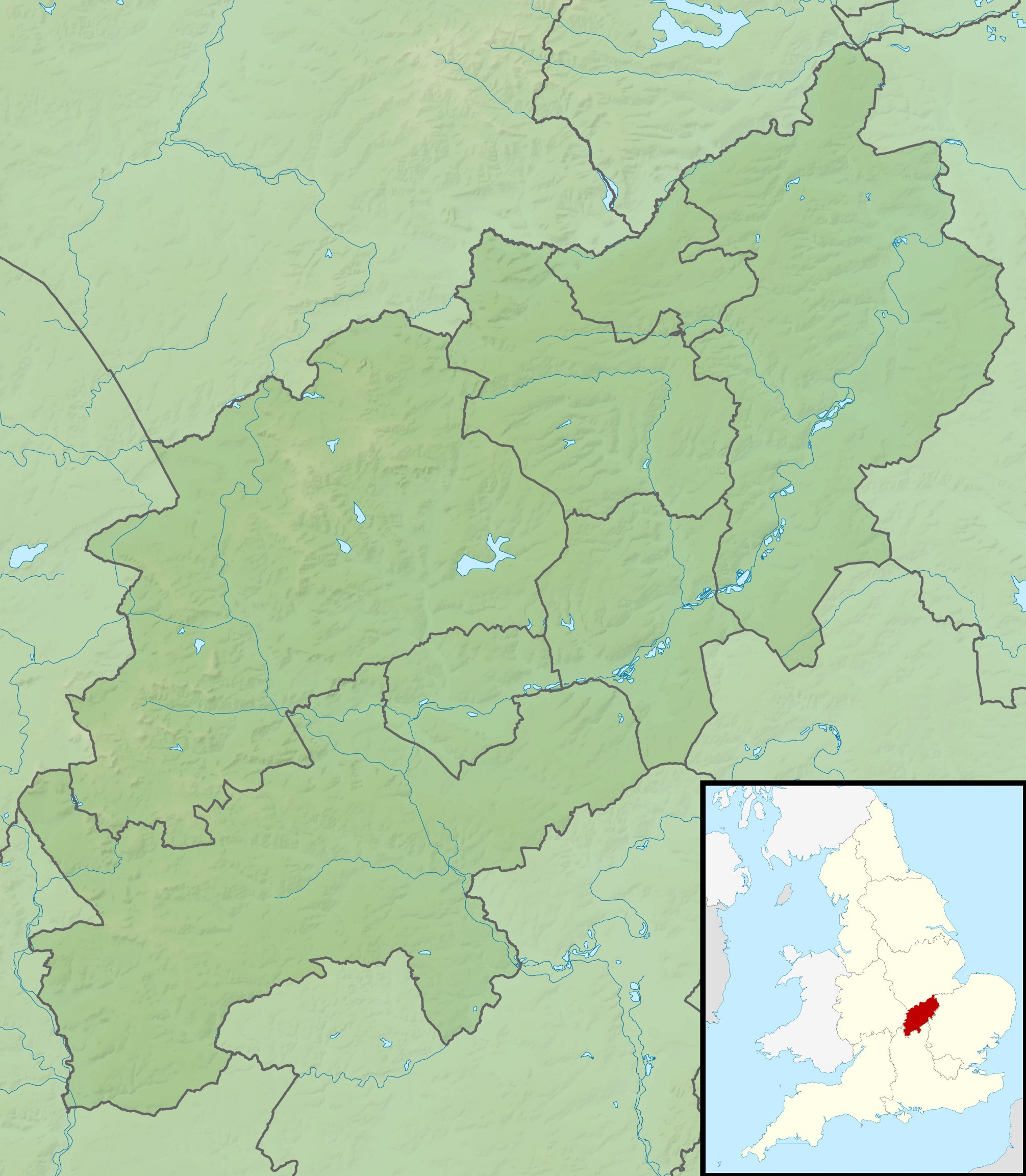
- Althorp within Northamptonshire
- Coordinates: 52.28°N 1.00°W
- Country: England
- Region: East Midlands
- District: West Northamptonshire
- Map Ref: SP678648

Althorp is a lost village within the grounds of the Althorp estate in the English county of Northamptonshire. The village is recorded in the Domesday Book. In the 15th century, the manor was held by the Catesby family who were probably responsible for clearing the settlement, for by 1505, the records show that there were no tenants. In 1508, the parish, including the cleared settlement of Althorp, was sold to John Spencer of Wormleighton in Warwickshire. By 1577, the land in the parish had been divided into four large sheep pastures. Althorp remains a civil parish.

== Remains today ==
There are some signs of earthworks on the site but much has been damaged by later activities such as ploughing. The main feature is a broad hollow way which runs up the hillside and is 1.5 metres (4 ft 11 in) in depth. There are several platforms on the south side of the hollow which are thought to be the sites of dwellings.

== See also ==
- List of lost settlements in Northamptonshire
