= John Parkhurst (lexicographer) =

English academic, clergyman and biblical lexicographer

- Born: June 1728
- Died: 21 February 1797 (aged 68); Epsom, Surrey
- Education: Rugby School
- Alma mater: Clare Hall, Cambridge
- Occupations: clergyman, academic, Biblical lexicographer
- Spouse(s): Susanna Myster; Millicent Northey

John Parkhurst (1728–1797) was an English academic, clergyman and biblical lexicographer.

== Life ==
The second son of John Parkhurst (1701–65) of Catesby House, Northamptonshire, he was born in June 1728. His mother was Ricarda, second daughter of Sir Robert Dormer. He was educated at Rugby School and Clare Hall, Cambridge, where he proceeded BA 1748, MA 1752, and was elected Fellow. Soon after he was ordained, the death of his elder brother made him heir to considerable estates at Catesby and Epsom, Surrey. For some time he acted as curate for a friend, but received no preferment. In 1785 he gave the family living of Epsom to Jonathan Boucher, though he knew him only by reputation.

Parkhurst led a life of literary retirement and study. In early life he became a follower of John Hutchinson and was influenced by his principles of biblical exegesis. He spent the latter part of his life at Epsom, where he died on 21 February 1797. His monument by John Flaxman in St Martin's parish church, Epsom carried an inscription by his friend William Jones of Nayland.

== Works ==
Parkhurst's Hebrew grammar and lexicon contributed to the tradition of study of unpointed Hebrew through to Samuel Sharpe. From his Greek lexicon he discarded accents and smooth breathings. Both his lexicons contain theology alongside general information.

Published works by John Parkhurst:

- A Serious and Friendly Address to the Rev. John Wesley &c. 1753, (on the witness of the Spirit).
- An Hebrew and English Lexicon, … to which is added a Methodical Hebrew Grammar &c., 1762; last edition 1830. In the later editions a Chaldee grammar was added; the Hebrew and Chaldee Grammar was published separately, 1840, edited by James Prosser.
- A Greek and English Lexicon to the New Testament … prefixed a … Greek Grammar &c., 1769; the edition of 1798 was edited by his daughter, Mrs. Thomas; last edition 1851, edited by Henry John Rose and John Richardson Major.
- The Divinity … of … Jesus Christ … in Answer to … Priestley &c., 1787.

In August 1797 The Gentleman's Magazine posthumously published a letter by Parkhurst on the confusion of tongues at Babel.

== Family ==
Parkhurst was married twice. His first marriage was in 1754, to Susanna, daughter of John Myster of Epsom. By her he had two sons who died before him, and a daughter who was married to the Revd. James Altham and died 25 April 1813. Susanna died in 1759. Parkhurst's second marriage was in 1761, to Millicent, daughter of James Northey of London. By her he had one daughter, Millecent, who was married to the Rev. Joseph Thomas in 1791. Millicent died 27 April 1800, aged 79.
