= Everdon Priory =

Priory in Everdon, Northamptonshire, England

Coordinates: 52.2116°N 1.1254°W

Everdon Priory was a priory in Northamptonshire, England. The village of Everdon is located about 6 km (4 miles) south-east of the town of Daventry.

Some time shortly after the Norman Conquest, the manor of Everdon was granted to the abbey of St. Mary of Bernay, Eure, in Normandy. Bernay was a Benedictine abbey, which had founded in 1025 by Judith, wife of Richard II, Duke of Normandy.

The abbot of Bernay became lord of the manor of Everdon and held a considerable amount of land around the village. The priory was built so that a small community of monks could administer these lands, acting as agents for the abbot. The abbot held advowson of the parish church, i.e. the right to present a priest to the living - a right that could be lucrative, as incumbents generally paid to be inducted, although this was technically the sin of simony.

Another responsibility and source of profit was the manorial court. Evidently the monks primarily regarded it as a source of income. In 1329 Quo warranto proceedings, a way of legally testing claims of authority, were taken out against the abbey. It was found that the monks had been imposing fines instead of corporal punishment. They had been taking a mark (money) for offences against the Assize of Bread and Ale, which regulated quantities and prices of these basic commodities; the culprits should have been subjected to the tumbril and pillory, instead of which the monks had been using convictions as a source of profit for their order. They had also been impounding stray animals illegally.

Everdon Priory was an alien priory, a subsidiary community to an abbey abroad, in this case in Normandy. This created great difficulties for the priory after John, King of England lost Normandy to the French in 1204. In times of war between England and France, the Crown took over the alien priories and their estates, granting them to prominent supporters to secure their loyalty: the coming of peace provided an opportunity to extort large fines for returning priories to their orders.

This cyclical process was ended by Henry V. Planning the war against France that would culminate in the Agincourt campaign, he put legislation before Parliament to dissolve the alien priories, Everdon included. Although many were given to royal favourites or sold, Everdon was retained as a Crown possession. This later allowed Henry VI to grant it to his newly founded Eton College in 1440, a gift that was confirmed by Edward IV in 1462.

The priory buildings themselves slowly decayed. Remains of the priory were still visible close to Eton's lordship house in the 18th century, but have since disappeared completely.
