= Walton (grounds) =

Lost settlement

Walton (Grounds)
- Lost Settlement
- Walton within Northamptonshire
- Coordinates: 52°00′23″N 1°15′49″W
- Country: England
- State: Northamptonshire
- Region: East Midlands
- District: West Northamptonshire
- Municipality: King's Sutton
- Map Ref: HOSM36735

Walton (Grounds) is located within the parish of King's Sutton in the English county of Northamptonshire.

Walton, also historically referred to as Waleton, was a settlement recorded in Domesday Book in the hundred of (King's) Sutton. In 1086, it had a recorded population of 10 households.

Today, there are 4 houses and 2 farms in the area.
