= Upper Catesby =

Hamlet in Northamptonshire, England

Coordinates: 52.2302°N 1.2299°W

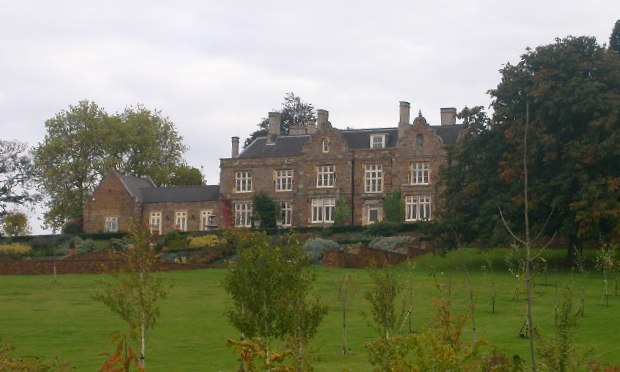
- Catesby House

- Location within Northamptonshire
- OS grid reference: SP526593
- Civil parish: Catesby
- Unitary authority: West Northamptonshire
- Ceremonial county: Northamptonshire
- Region: East Midlands
- Country: England
- Sovereign state: United Kingdom
- Post town: Daventry
- Postcode district: NN11
- Dialling code: 01327
- Police: Northamptonshire
- Fire: Northamptonshire
- Ambulance: East Midlands
- UK Parliament: Daventry
- Website: Catesby (Parish Meeting)

Upper Catesby is a hamlet in the civil parish of Catesby, Northamptonshire, about 3.5 miles (5.6 km) southwest of Daventry. The hamlet is about 550 feet (170 m) above sea level, at the top of a northwest-facing escarpment. The population is included in the civil parish of Hellidon.

== Archaeology ==
In 1895 during the sinking of a shaft for Catesby Tunnel a Roman cinerary urn was found about 575 yards (526 m) south of Upper Catesby.

== Village ==
The village's name means 'farm/settlement of Katr/Kati'.

In 1389 Upper Catesby was recorded as Overcatsby. It is a shrunken village. The modern hamlet has only a handful of 19th- and 20th-century houses, but is surrounded by numerous earthen features showing where cottages and the main village street had been. Most of the fields around the former village still have clear ridge and furrow marks from the ploughing of the medieval arable farming with an open field system divided into narrow strips.

== Catesby House ==
Catesby House is a Jacobethan country house about 400 yards (370 m) west of Upper Catesby. It was built in 1863 and enlarged in 1894. It includes 16th-century linenfold panelling said to come from Catesby Priory, and 17th-century panelling, doorcases and a stair with barley-sugar balusters, all from the previous 17th-century Catesby House that was in Lower Catesby.

== Catesby Tunnel ==
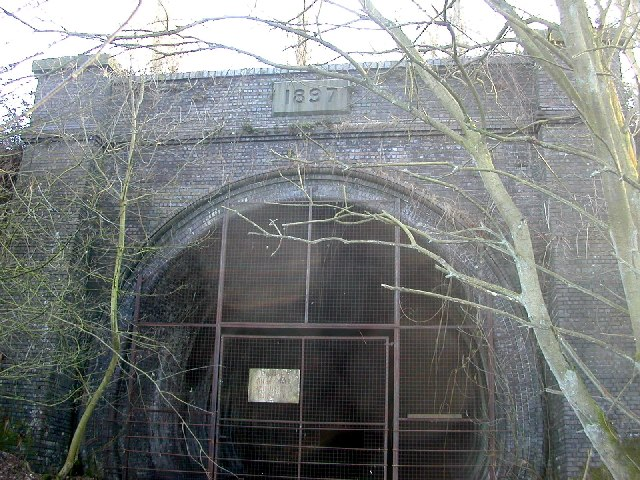
Catesby Tunnel north portal, just northwest of Upper Catesby

Catesby Tunnel is a disused railway tunnel on the route of the former Great Central Main Line. It passes about 250 yards (230 m) west of Upper Catesby and about 100 yards (91 m) east of Catesby House. The tunnel's north portal is about 400 yards (370 m) northwest of the hamlet, and its south portal is about 0.6 miles (1 km) north of Charwelton, just inside the southern boundary of Catesby parish.

== Sources ==
- Boyd-Hope, Gary; Sargent, Andrew (2007). Railways and Rural Life: S W A Newton and the Great Central Railway. Swindon: English Heritage and Leicestershire County Council. ISBN 978-185074-959-2.
- Pevsner, Nikolaus; Cherry, Bridget (revision) (1973) [1961]. Northamptonshire. The Buildings of England (2nd ed.). Harmondsworth: Penguin Books. p. 145. ISBN 0-14-071022-1.
- RCHME, ed. (1981). "Catesby". An Inventory of the Historical Monuments in the County of Northamptonshire. Vol. 3 – Archaeological sites in North-West Northamptonshire. London: Royal Commission on the Historical Monuments of England. pp. 37–43.
