= Lower Catesby =

Hamlet in Northamptonshire, England

Coordinates: 52.2313°N 1.2474°W

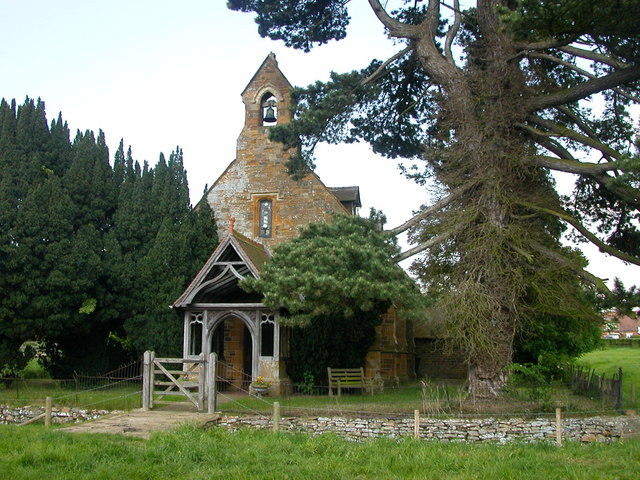
- St Mary & St Edmund parish church

- Location within Northamptonshire
- OS grid reference: SP5159
- Civil parish: Catesby
- Unitary authority: West Northamptonshire
- Ceremonial county: Northamptonshire
- Region: East Midlands
- Country: England
- Sovereign state: United Kingdom
- Post town: Daventry
- Postcode district: NN11
- Dialling code: 01327
- Police: Northamptonshire
- Fire: Northamptonshire
- Ambulance: East Midlands
- UK Parliament: Daventry
- Website: Catesby (Parish Meeting)

Lower Catesby is a hamlet in the civil parish of Catesby, Northamptonshire, about 4 miles (6.4 km) southwest of Daventry. Lower Catesby is beside the nascent River Leam, which rises about 1 mile (1.6 km) to the south in the parish of Hellidon. The Jurassic Way long-distance footpath passes through Lower Catesby. The population of the hamlet is included in the civil parish of Hellidon.

The hamlets name means 'Katr's/Kati's farm/settlement'.

== Archaeology ==
Roman coins of the Empress Faustina I (early 2nd century) and Emperor Maximian (late 3rd century) are said to have been found in Catesby Park near Lower Catesby before 1720.

== Manor ==
The Domesday Book of 1086 records a manor of four hides at Catesby, and that one Sasfrid held it of William Peveral. The same four hides held of William Peverel (sic) is recorded again in the 12th century. In about 1175 it was held by Sasfrid's grandson Robert de Esseby (i.e. "Ashby", referring to Robert's caput at Canons Ashby).

== Priory ==
Robert de Esseby founded a priory of Cistercian nuns at Lower Catesby in about 1175. In the 1230s Edmund Rich, Archbishop of Canterbury, committed his sisters Margaret and Alice to be nuns at the priory. Edmund was canonized in 1247, Margaret was elected prioress in 1245 and she served until her death in 1257. In 1267 William Maudit, 8th Earl of Warwick died and his heart was buried at Catesby Priory.

In 1535 Parliament passed the Suppression of Religious Houses Act 1535. Thomas Cromwell's commissioners inspected the priory in September 1535 and May 1536, and reported that the prioress and her nine nuns were of good faith and blameless character. Henry VIII nonetheless ordered the commissioners to suppress the priory, which they did before the end of 1536. The last prioress was pensioned off, her nuns and dependents were evicted, all the priory's furnishings were seized, its hand-bells were scrapped, and the lead from the roofs of the priory church and buildings was taken and sold for scrap.

== Catesby House and parish church ==
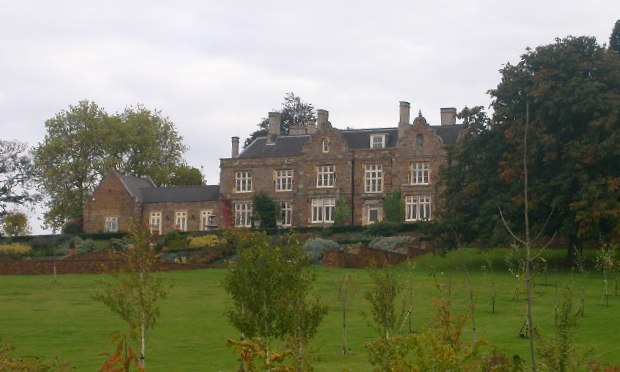
The present Catesby House, built in 1863

In 1537 the Crown sold the remains of the priory to John Onley, who had at least part of the building turned into his family mansion. Early in the 17th century it passed from the Onley family to a family called Parkhurst. Also in the 17th century a church was built or rebuilt in Lower Catesby. An engraving made in about 1720 and drawings made in 1844 suggest a 16th-century house arranged around a central courtyard and a symmetrical west front rebuilt about 1700, with a very formal garden around the house and extending to the east of it. The central courtyard could have been derived from the priory courtyard.

In Catesby churchyard is the tomb of John Parkhurst (1701–65). One of his sons was the Revd. John Parkhurst (1728–97), who was a biblical lexicographer.

In 1861 the 17th-century church was demolished and replaced by the present Church of England parish church of SS Edmund and Mary, which was designed by Gillet of Leicester and completed in 1862. The present church includes a Decorated Gothic sedilia and piscina dating from about 1300, almost certainly carved for the priory church when it was rebuilt in about 1301. The present church also includes Jacobean woodwork from its 17th-century predecessor: a communion rail with barley-twist balusters, and a pulpit and tester.

In 1863 the Catesby House was demolished and a new one was built above lower Catesby, about half-way up the hill to Upper Catesby. The new Catesby House is Jacobethan and incorporates items from previous buildings at Lower Catesby: 16th-century linenfold panelling said to come from the priory, and 17th-century panelling, doorcases and a stair with barley-sugar balusters, all from the old Catesby House.

In 1894 Catesby House was enlarged and a vestry and west porch were added to the church.

A long, rectangular formal pond survives from the gardens of the old Catesby House. There are earthworks, many of them rectilinear, indicating house or priory walls and further formal ponds. It is not entirely clear which walls are from the house and which are from the priory.

== Village ==
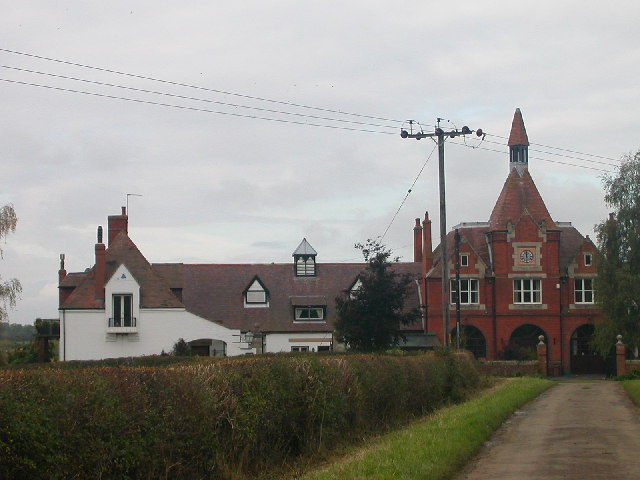
Houses at Lower Catesby

The hamlet of Lower Catesby is a shrunken village. The modern hamlet has only a handful of houses, all of which are 17th-century or later. It is surrounded by numerous earthen features showing where cottages and the main village street had been. Most of the fields around the former village still have clear ridge and furrow marks from the ploughing of the medieval arable farming with an open field system divided into narrow strips.

Just north of the church is a row of four early 17th-century cottages. Pevsner and Cherry commented that the row "looks as if it were built as almshouses".

Stone House in Upper Catesby, about 275 yards (251 m) east of the ruins of Upper Catesby church, is early 18th-century. Its porch incorporates a 13th-century Early English Gothic arch said to be from the priory.

== Sources ==
- Adkins, W.R.D.; Serjeantson, R.M., eds. (1902). A History of the County of Northampton. Victoria County History. Vol. 1. Westminster: Archibald Constable & Co. p. 370.
- Pevsner, Nikolaus; Cherry, Bridget (revision) (1973) [1961]. Northamptonshire. The Buildings of England (2nd ed.). Harmondsworth: Penguin Books. p. 145. ISBN 0-14-071022-1.
- RCHME, ed. (1981). "Catesby". An Inventory of the Historical Monuments in the County of Northamptonshire. Vol. 3 – Archaeological sites in North-West Northamptonshire. London: Royal Commission on the Historical Monuments of England. pp. 37–43.
- Serjeantson, R.M.; Adkins, W.R.D., eds. (1906). "The Priory of Catesby". A History of the County of Northampton. Victoria County History. Vol. 2. Archibald Constable & Co. pp. 121–125.
