= Catesby Tunnel =

Former railway tunnel in England

Coordinates: 52.2232°N 1.2287°W

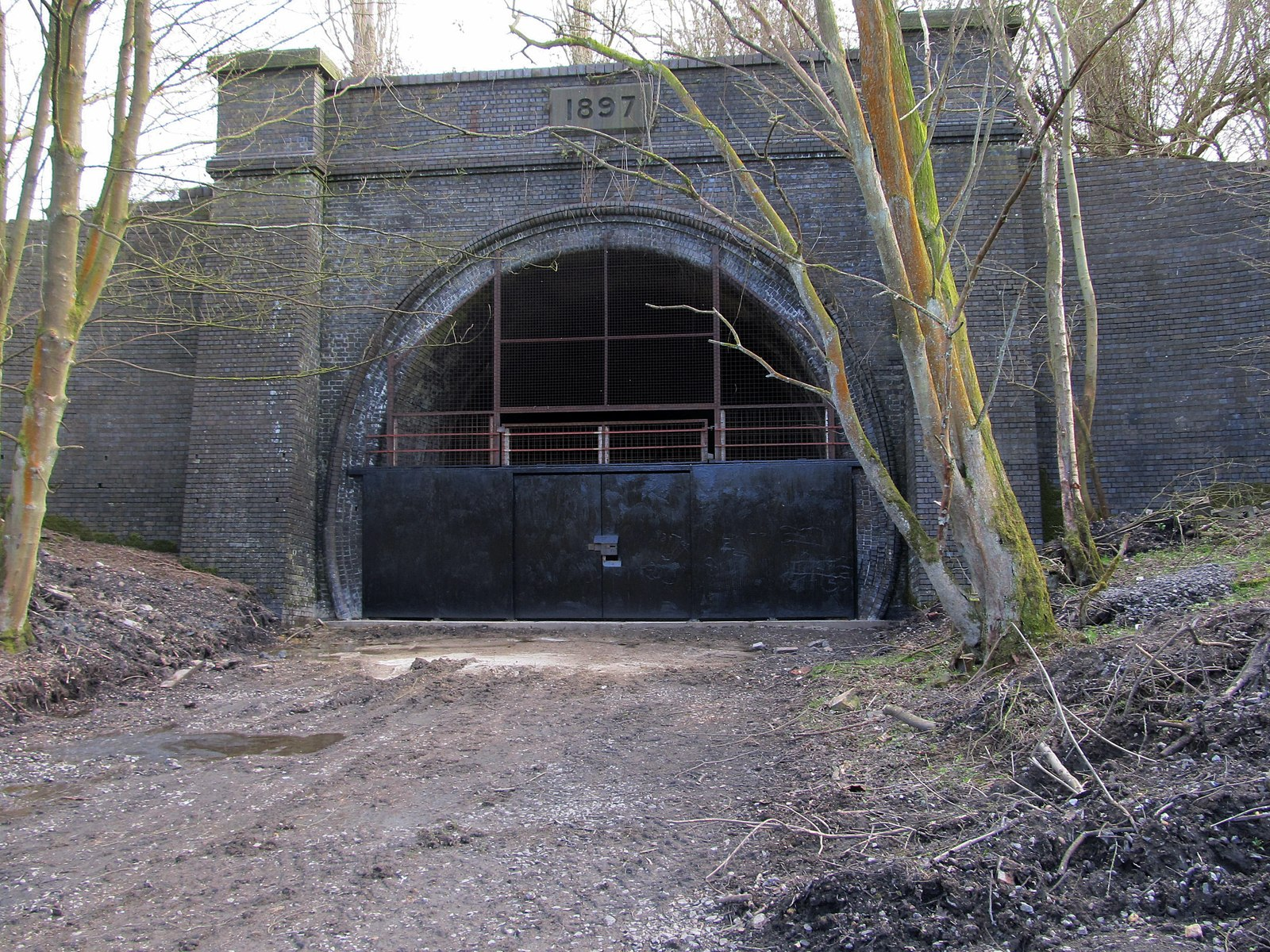
Catesby Tunnel's north portal, just northwest of Upper Catesby

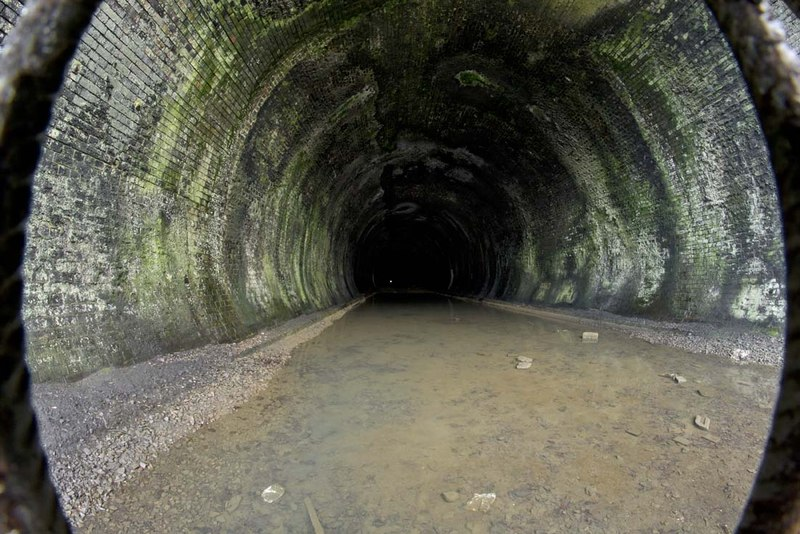
Inside the north end of the tunnel in 2014

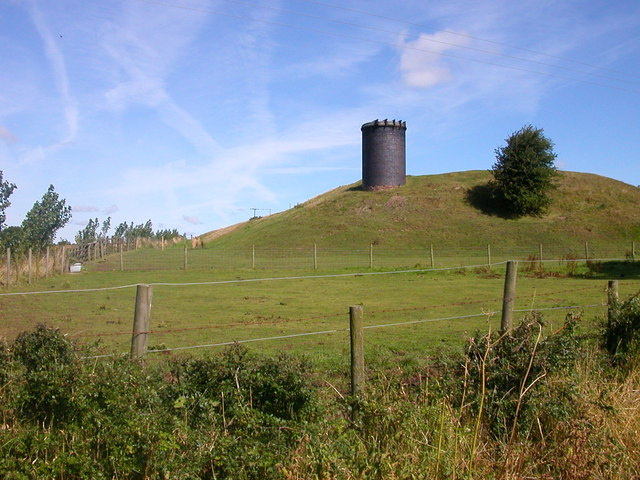
The southernmost air shaft

Catesby Tunnel is a disused railway tunnel in Northamptonshire on the route of the former Great Central Main Line. Its northern portal is about 1,100 yards (1,000 m) south of Catesby Viaduct and 250 yards (230 m) west of Upper Catesby, with the tunnel ending at Charwelton to the south. In terms of both length and gauge, Catesby Tunnel is unusually large, at 27 feet (8.2 m) wide, 25 feet 6 inches (7.8 m) high, and 2,997 yards (2.7 km; 1.7 mi) long.

The tunnel was completed in 1897, and was closed in 1966 when the line was made redundant by British Rail. After lying abandoned and flooded for over 50 years, proposals were granted in 2017 for the conversion of the wide, straight tunnel into an aerodynamic test facility for road and race cars.

== Description ==
The tunnel, its portals and air shafts are all lined and faced with hard Staffordshire blue brick and a total of about 30 million bricks were used. The tunnel has five air shafts; four are in Catesby parish and each has a diameter of 10 feet (3 m). The fifth is in the neighbouring parish of Hellidon, and has a diameter of 15 feet (4.6 m) for greater airflow. About 2,900,000 cubic yards (2,200,000 m^{3}) of material was dug out to make the tunnel, which is straight throughout due to the Great Central Railway (GCR) being built for speed and on a rising gradient of 1:176 to the south.

== History ==
The Great Central Railway (GCR) intended its London Extension to pass through Catesby parish in a cutting. However, the occupant of Catesby House, Henry Attenborough, owned much of the land in the parish and insisted that the line pass beneath it in a tunnel to preserve the landscape. Thomas Oliver & Son of Horsham was the contractor to build the Rugby Central — Woodford Halse section of the line. The first 44 yards (40 m) from the north portal were dug using cut-and-cover, with the remainder built by sinking nine construction shafts in 1895 (a Roman cinerary urn was found in one shaft), and completed the tunnel in May 1897. Unlike the tunnel construction of the earlier Victorian era, excavation was able to be accelerated through the use of Ruston steam navvies instead of being entirely dug by hand. The first services to use the tunnel were coal trains, which started running on 25 July 1898. The line opened fully on 15 March 1899.

On 4 January 1906 a rail on the Down track broke and derailed an afternoon express from Marylebone to Manchester Piccadilly with about 50 passengers aboard. The train was travelling at about 60 mph (97 km/h) and tore up about 440 yards (400 m) of track before it came to a halt. All five coaches were derailed and the last coach fouled the Up track, on which a goods train was due. The crew of the express acted to protect their train: the driver placed a detonator on one rail of the Up track and the guard sounded the train whistle, both of which gave the crew of the approaching Up goods enough warning to stop short of the wreckage.

British Railways closed the Great Central Main Line (GCML) through the tunnel on 5 September 1966, and the track was lifted shortly thereafter. With the withdrawal of a maintenance regime after closure, a blocked drain exacerbated water ingress such that 1 foot (0.30 m) or more of floodwater filled some parts of the tunnel.

=== Redevelopment ===
Numerous reopening proposals for sections of the GCML have featured Catesby Tunnel. In 2000, Chiltern Railways expressed an interest in reopening the route to passengers as far as Rugby or even Leicester, though this never came forward. The trackbed was also included in failed proposals by Central Railway to build a new intermodal freight line from Liverpool to Europe. It was also part of a possible alignment explored during the planning phase of High Speed 2; the preferred route ended up following a course several miles further west.

Proposals emerged in 2014 to convert the tunnel into a vehicle and professional cycling team testing facility. The planning approval was granted in February 2017. The facility allows performance, aerodynamics, air cooling and emissions to be analysed in a controlled environment at full scale, the only facility of its type for hire anywhere in the world. With the ends of the tunnel being preserved for roosting bats, about 1.5 miles (2.4 km) in the centre is available for testing. Cars are able to maintain 100 miles per hour (160 km/h) for about 40 seconds before braking. Public tours are available about once a month. Engineering work for conversion to a wind tunnel, including renovation of the drainage, was started in 2020 with a projected cost of £13 million. The facility opened as a test facility in summer 2021, with a remote-control turntable at the end.

In 2024 the tunnel was used for the YouTube series "Top Gear Tunnel Run".

== See also ==
- Laurel Hill Tunnel
