= Hellidon =

Village in Northamptonshire, England

Coordinates: 52.2223°N 1.2475°W

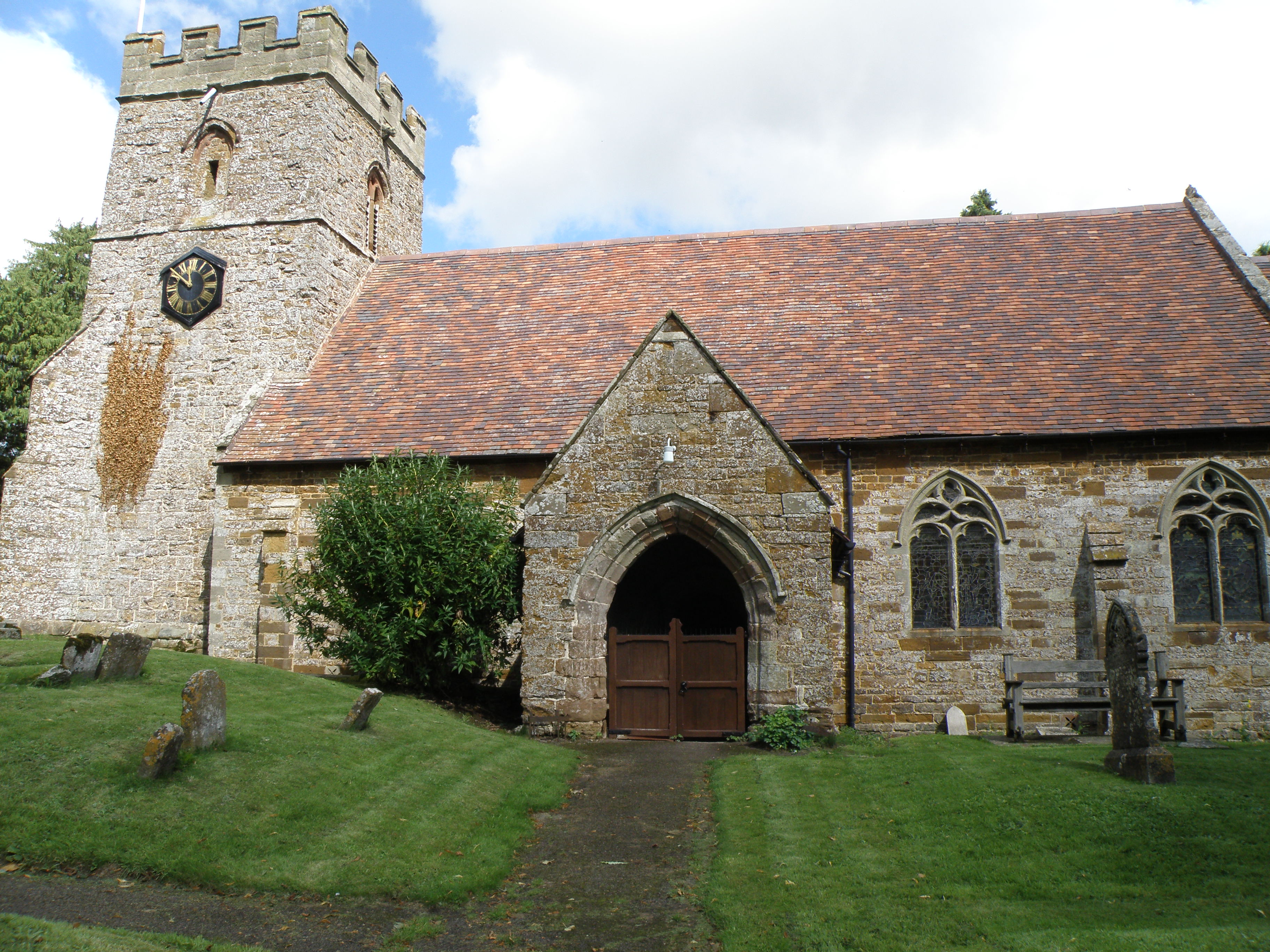
- St John the Baptist parish church

- Location within Northamptonshire
- Population: 256 (2011 Census)
- OS grid reference: SP5158
- Unitary authority: West Northamptonshire
- Ceremonial county: Northamptonshire
- Region: East Midlands
- Country: England
- Sovereign state: United Kingdom
- Post town: Daventry
- Postcode district: NN11
- Dialling code: 01327
- Police: Northamptonshire
- Fire: Northamptonshire
- Ambulance: East Midlands
- UK Parliament: Daventry
- Website: Hellidon (Parish Meeting)

Hellidon is a village and civil parish about 5 miles (8 km) south-west of Daventry in Northamptonshire, England. The parish area is about 1,600 acres (650 ha). It lies 520 feet (160 m) – 590 feet (180 m) above sea level on the north face of an ironstone ridge, its highest point, 670 feet (200 m) at Windmill Hill, being 0.5 miles (800 m) south-east of the village. The Leam and tributaries rise in the parish. The 2011 Census gave a population (with Lower and Upper Catesby) of 256, estimated at 286 in 2019. The long-distance Jurassic Way footpath linking Banbury, Oxfordshire, and Stamford, Lincolnshire, passes through. The origin of the name is unclear. "Holy Valley", "Haegla's Valley" and "Unstable valley" have been suggested, with the Old English "dun", meaning hill.

== Manors ==
The Domesday Book of 1086 omits Hellidon. In the 12th century a manor of four hides (about 49 ha) at "Eliden" was recorded in the fee of Berkhamsted. From the 13th century Hellidon had two manors: Baskervilles and Giffords.

The present manor house at the north-west end occupies the site of the Baskervilles. Giffords Manor was on the north-east side – there are substantial rectilinear earthworks where the house is said to have stood. It had been abandoned by the time of Hellidon's 18th-century land surveys.

== Church and chapel ==
=== Church of England ===
The Church of England parish church of St John the Baptist is Decorated Gothic in style, and so from late 13th or early 14th century. The west tower survives in its medieval condition, but in 1845–1847 the nave and chancel were heavily restored for the Rev C. S. Holthouse under the Gothic Revival architect William Butterfield. Twenty years later Butterfield designed the north aisle and the parish school, both were built in 1867. In 1897 a north aisle was added to the chancel, designed by Matthew Houlding. There is also a north transept. St John's is a Grade II* listed building.

The west tower has a ring of five bells. Hugh II Watts, who had foundries at Bedford and Leicester, cast the fourth bell in 1615 and the second, third and tenor in 1635. The Whitechapel Bell Foundry cast the treble bell in 1993.

=== Nonconformist ===
Hellidon had a Nonconformist chapel in Berry Lane. The building is now a private house.

== Economic and social history ==
Hellidon Inclosure Act 1774
- Act of Parliament
- Parliament of Great Britain
- Long title: An Act for dividing and enclosing the Open and Common Fields, Common Pastures, Common Meadows, and other Commonable Lands, of and within the Parish and Liberties of Hellidon, in the County of Northampton.
- Citation: 14 Geo. 3. c. 108 Pr.
- Territorial extent: Great Britain

Dates
- Royal assent: 14 June 1774
- Commencement: 13 January 1774 (Note: Start of session.)

Status: Current legislation

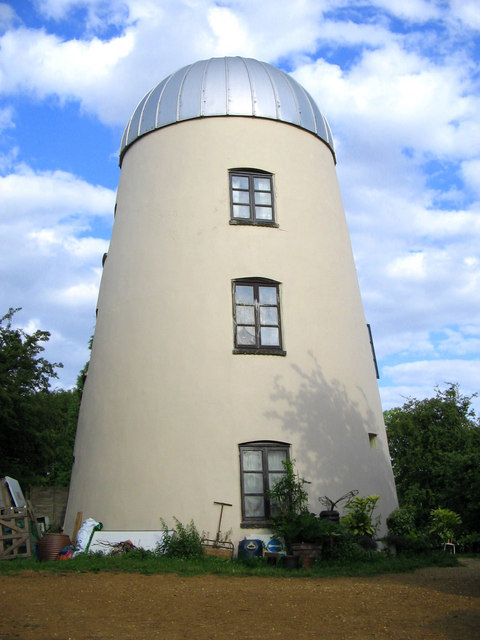
Converted tower mill on Windmill Hill

Until the 1770s an open field system of farming prevailed. There were five such fields, mapped in 1726 as Further Field, Lower Field, Middle Field, Upper Field and Short Attle Field. Parliament passed an inclosure act, the Hellidon Inclosure Act 1774 (14 Geo. 3. c. 108 Pr.), for which it was surveyed in 1775. There the earlier Middle Field was marked as Hill Field and Short Attle Field simply as Attle Field.

On Windmill Hill a tower mill was built in the late 18th or early 19th century. By 1973 it was derelict, but it has since been restored as an ancillary building for the Windmill Vineyard planted around it.

A Hellidon friendly society called the Institute, founded in 1805 still existed to mark its centenary in 1905.

The earliest record of a post office is from 1847. The first postmaster was John Wells, who described himself as a shoemaker in the 1841 Census, but a shopkeeper in 1849. By 1854 he appeared as "Postmaster and Letter Receiver".

The Grange, designed by William Butterfield and built for Rev. C. S. Holthouse, has a small core of an older house that Holthouse bought. The enlargement took place in 1850 and again in 1861. It is a Grade II* listed building.

Hellidon's highest recorded population was 449 in 1861.

In August 1904 a fire in Cox's Lane destroyed three thatched cottages.

=== Railways ===
The Great Central Main Line from Yorkshire to London Marylebone was built in the 1890s. It passed through the eastern edge of the parish in the 2,997-yard (2.7 km) Catesby Tunnel, and was completed in 1897. One of the tunnel's five air shafts is in the parish. Goods traffic commenced in 1898 and the nearest passenger station opened in March 1899 at Charwelton, about 2 miles (3 km) south-east of Hellidon. The station was closed in March 1963 and the line in September 1966.

From 1917 until 1961 the Park Gate Iron and Steel Company had a quarry about 0.5 miles (800 m) south of the village, on the boundary with Charwelton parish. From there it ran a 1.5-mile (2 km) mineral railway down the Cherwell valley to take ironstone to the main line at Charwelton station. A steam locomotive called Charwelton was built for the line in 1917, worked it until 1942, and is now preserved on the Kent and East Sussex Railway.

=== Notable person ===
- George Harry Dury (1916–1996), geographer and hydrologist, was born at Hellidon.

== Amenities ==
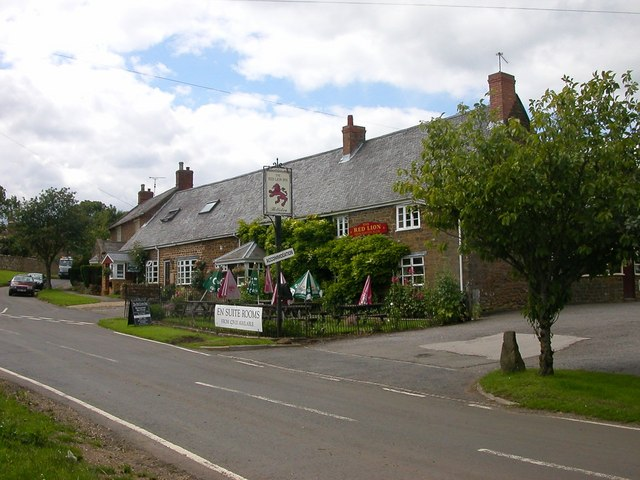
The Red Lion public house

Hellidon has a public house, the Red Lion. In January 2019 it still had a post office.

== Sources ==
- Adkins, W.R.D.; Serjeantson, R.M., eds. (1906). A History of the County of Northampton. Victoria County History. Vol. 1. Westminster: Archibald Constable & Co. p. 370.
- Boyd-Hope, Gary; Sargent, Andrew; Newton, Sydney (2007). Railways and Rural Life: S.W.A. Newton and the Great Central Railway. Swindon: English Heritage and Leicestershire County Council. pp. 85–89. ISBN 978-185074-959-2.
- Fell, Jenifer (2000). Three Ells in Hellidon. self-published. ISBN 0951565311.
- Pevsner, Nikolaus; Cherry, Bridget (revision) (1973) [1961]. Northamptonshire. The Buildings of England (2nd ed.). Harmondsworth: Penguin Books. p. 252. ISBN 0-14-071022-1.
- RCHME, ed. (1981). "Hellidon". An Inventory of the Historical Monuments in the County of Northamptonshire. Vol. 3 – Archaeological sites in North-West Northamptonshire. London: Royal Commission on the Historical Monuments of England. pp. 102–103.
