= Catesby, Northamptonshire =

Civil parish in West Northamptonshire, England

Coordinates: 52.2302°N 1.2319°W

Catesby
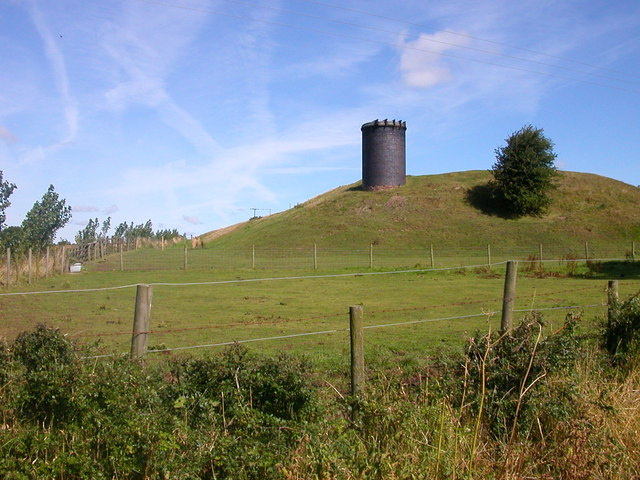
- One of Catesby Tunnel's ventilation shafts

- Location within Northamptonshire
- Population: 76 (2001 Census)
- OS grid reference: SP5259
- Civil parish: Catesby
- Unitary authority: West Northamptonshire
- Ceremonial county: Northamptonshire
- Region: East Midlands
- Country: England
- Sovereign state: United Kingdom
- Post town: Daventry
- Postcode district: NN11
- Dialling code: 01327
- Police: Northamptonshire
- Fire: Northamptonshire
- Ambulance: East Midlands
- UK Parliament: Daventry
- Website: Catesby (Parish Meeting)

Catesby is a civil parish in West Northamptonshire, England. There are two hamlets, Lower Catesby and Upper Catesby, each of which is a shrunken village. The site of the abandoned village of Newbold is also in the parish. The 2001 Census recorded a parish population of 76.

Catesby Priory was a community of Cistercian nuns in Lower Catesby, founded in about 1175 and suppressed in 1536. The Priory then became a private residence, Catesby House. There was no separate church for the village: the graveyard and chapel of Catesby House served the community.

The lexicographer, Rev.John Parkhurst was born at Lower Catesby.

In the eastern part of the parish is Catesby Tunnel, a tunnel on the former Great Central Line that was completed in 1897 and has been disused since 1966.
