= Snorscombe =

Former hamlet in Northamptonshire, England

Coordinates: 52.20081°N 1.12790°W

Snorscombe is a ruined hamlet south of Everdon in Northamptonshire, England, whose rural location, now on private land, makes it extremely hard to access.

== History ==
The hamlet was once a thriving community. The medieval residents would have worked for the local Lord under the manorial system and cultivated the surrounding land. The manor at Snorscombe was held by a Philip Lovell at the time of King John. By 1534 it had passed to the Knightley family.

The manor house was a farmhouse by the early 18th century and all that was left of the village was that farm, a watermill and a cottage.
