= Canons Ashby (lost settlement) =

Lost village in Northamptonshire, England

Deserted village of Canons Ashby
- Lost Settlement
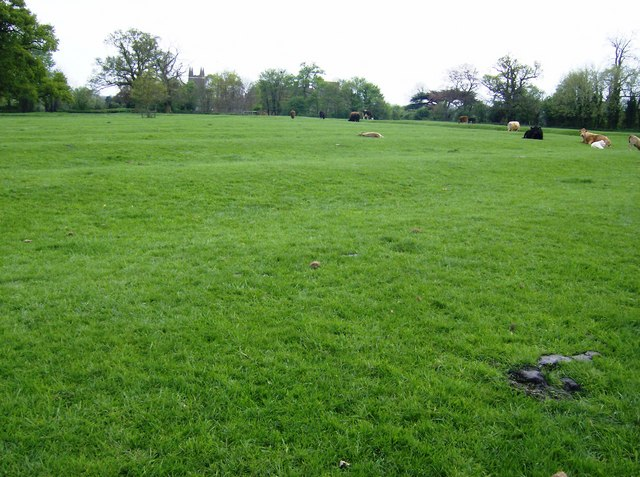
- The site of the lost settlement of Canons Ashby

- Canons Ashby within Northamptonshire
- Coordinates: 52°9′10″N 1°9′30″W
- Country: England
- State: Northamptonshire
- Region: East Midlands
- District: Daventry
- Municipality: Canons Ashby
- Map Ref: SP576507

The lost village of Canons Ashby is located in ground to the north of Canons Ashby House in the English county of Northamptonshire. Today there is still a small village around the house but this is located away from the original settlement, since the original settlement is now just field occupied by a herd of cows.
Ascebi is the name of the medieval village that is the lost settlement, Canons Ashby itself is currently not lost at all and people can easily find it on any map.

== History ==
The lost village of Canons Ashby is listed in the Domesday book of 1086 with a recorded population of 16. In 1105 an Augustinian priory was founded here at the southern end of the village. The priory soon became the owner of most of the parish. In 1301, 18 residents had paid the Lay Subsidy, which was a tax based on the value of lands and possessions and was used to raise money for the Crown to facilitate such things as payment of military forces and building of ships. In 1316 the village has an entry in the Nomina Villarum, which was a list made of all cities, boroughs and townships, and the lords of them, which was carried out for King Edward III. In 1343 there were 41 houses in the village. In 1377 the poll tax was paid by 82 people of the village. The prior of the nearby priory enclosed some land of the village depriving it of 100 acres (0.40 km^{2}) and destroying three houses. In 1492 the prior evicted another 24 people from their homes. By 1524 there were only 21 residents eligible for tax and by 1535 this number had dropped to nine. On the dissolution of the monasteries in 1537 the village and the priory came into the ownership of Sir Francis Bryon who in turn sold it to Sir John Cope a year later. This probably saw the demise of the village as Cope is recorded as having 2,000 sheep upon the parish. The Hearth Tax returns of 1674 show only five tax-payers in the parish.

== Remains today ==
The surviving earthworks on the site are in good condition and indicate the large size of this lost village. The original main street was on the line of the north-south running lane that still leads past Canons Ashby House. There are hollow ways that cross the lane east to west indicating other village thoroughfares. To the east of this hollow way there are a series of embanked paddocks and platforms of former buildings. Over the whole of the site there are the same sort of features and with close scrutiny the format of the village can almost be made out. Over the years several sherds of medieval pottery have been found, dating from the 13th and 14th centuries.
