= Charwelton =

Village and civil parish in England

Coordinates: 52.195°N 1.219°W

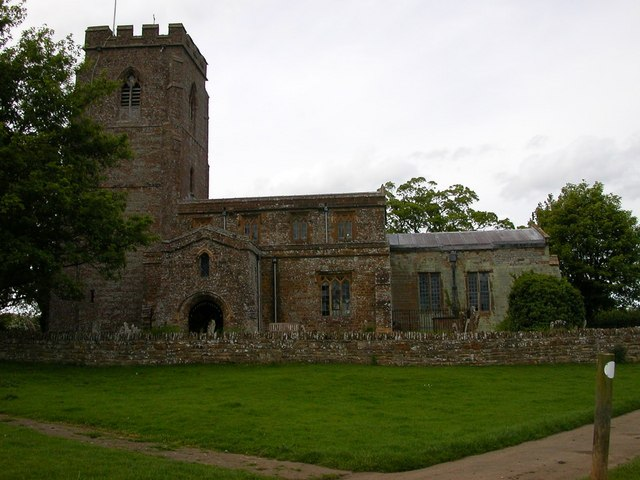
- Holy Trinity parish church

- Location within Northamptonshire
- Population: 220 (2011 census)
- OS grid reference: SP5355
- Unitary authority: West Northamptonshire
- Ceremonial county: Northamptonshire
- Region: East Midlands
- Country: England
- Sovereign state: United Kingdom
- Post town: Daventry
- Postcode district: NN11
- Dialling code: 01327
- Police: Northamptonshire
- Fire: Northamptonshire
- Ambulance: East Midlands
- UK Parliament: Daventry
- Website: Charwelton

Charwelton is a village and civil parish about 5 miles (8 km) south of Daventry in Northamptonshire, England. The 2011 census recorded the parish's population (including Fawsley) as 220.

The villages name means 'River Cherwell farm/settlement'.

The present village, formerly called Upper or Over Charwelton, is where the main road between Daventry and Banbury, now the A361 road, crosses the river. The parish church is almost 1 mile (2 km) southeast at Church Charwelton, which is a hamlet and deserted medieval village.

The Jurassic Way long distance footpath between Banbury and Stamford passes through both Church Charwelton and Upper Charwelton.

== Manor ==
There were several small manors in the parish. The Domesday Book of 1086 records the largest as being two hides and "four-fifths of half a hide" held by one Ralf of Robert, Count of Mortain. In the 12th century this manor was recorded as two hides and four "small virgates" in the fee of Berkhamsted. (There were 10 "small virgates" to a hide.) Thorney Abbey had an estate at Charwelton: the Domesday Book records it has half a hide; in the 12th century it was recorded as four small virgates. Domesday records William de Cahagnes holding half a hide at Charwelton of the Count of Mortain; in the 12th century Hugh de Chaham held the same half hide of the fee of the Earl of Leicester. Domesday records that Hugh de Grandmesnil held one virgate at Charwelton; in the 12th century this estate was recorded as four small virgates held of the Earl of Leicester. Also in the 12th century there was an estate of four small virgates in the fee of Adam de Napton.

At the end of the 12th century William and Ralf de Cheinduit granted a manor at Charwelton to the Cistercian Biddlesden Abbey in Buckinghamshire. The Abbey retained the manor until it was forced to surrender all its properties to the Crown in the dissolution of the monasteries in 1538.

Charwelton Manor House contains much early 16th century panelling, an early 17th-century fireplace and a late 17th-century staircase. It is an ironstone building of two storeys with a hipped roof. Its present façade of five bays was added probably early in the 18th century.

== Parish church ==
The Church of England parish church of the Holy Trinity is at Church Charwelton. Its earliest features include the west windows of the south aisle, which are a stepped trio of lancet windows from about 1300. Holy Trinity has both a south and a north aisle, and the latter has a Decorated Gothic three-bay arcade. The west tower also is Decorated Gothic. The south porch is Perpendicular Gothic and the font may be 15th century. The chancel was largely rebuilt in 1901–04. Holy Trinity is a Grade I listed building.

Holy Trinity contains a series of monuments to the Andrewe or Andrewes family. Several family members who died late in the 15th or early in the 16th century are commemorated by monumental brasses. The largest are a pair 4 feet (1.2 m) long representing Thomas Andrewe (died 1496) and his wife. From the latter half of the 16th century are two carved stone monuments. A tomb-chest bears recumbent effigies of Sir Thomas Andrew (died 1564) and his two successive wives, while a well-carved relief in fine white stone commemorates Thomas Andrew (died 1590) and his family. The church interior also includes decoration by the artist Henry Bird of Northampton.

The church tower has a ring of five bells. Thomas I Newcombe, whose bell-foundry may have been in Leicester, cast the fourth bell in 1510. Hugh II Watts, who had foundries in Leicester and Bedford, cast the tenor bell in 1630. Abraham I Rudhall of Gloucester cast the treble bell in 1716. John Taylor & Son of Loughborough cast the current second and third bells in 1844.

Holy Trinity parish is part of the Benefice of Badby with Newnham and Charwelton with Fawsley and Preston Capes, which was formed in 1991.

== Economic and social history ==
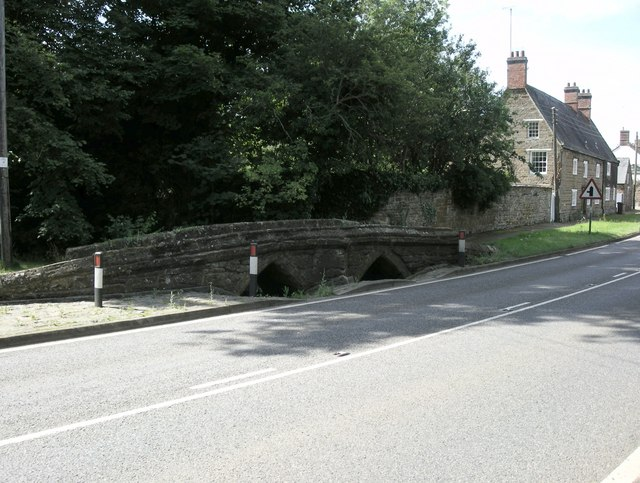
Charwelton's medieval packhorse bridge

Charwelton's earliest surviving crossing over the river is a narrow packhorse bridge at Upper Charwelton, only 3 feet (0.9 m) wide between parapets. It has two arches and one cutwater, and may be 15th century. It is a Grade II* listed building.

The Nomina Villarum of 1316 records Church Charwelton by name, but in 1491 John Rous recorded that it was in danger of being depopulated and in 1791 John Bridges recorded that much of its population had gone. Bridges claimed the Wars of the Roses in the late 15th century had caused this, but modern scholarship identifies the Andrewes family's sheep farming as the cause. In 1417 the merchant Thomas Andrews bought a small estate at Charwelton, and later he and his son, also called Thomas, leased much land in the parish. By 1547 a third Thomas Andrews was keeping 1,200 sheep here and two other landholders kept 500 and 300 respectively.

North of Upper Charwelton, between the village and Charwelton Hall, are the earthworks of an abandoned part of the village. Just west of Charwelton Hall are traces of former ponds dug beside the Cherwell. They are recorded as having been fish ponds, but they had artificial islands in them that suggests they were made for wild fowl.

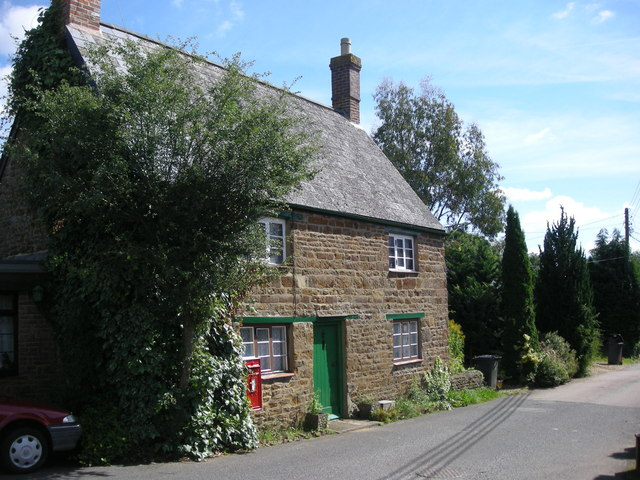
Former post office in Church Street

The parish's common fields were enclosed by agreement in 1531. Much of the ridge and furrow pattern of the common fields is still visible, and is best preserved along the Cherwell valley.

Earthworks of the former village survive on all sides of the parish church and manor house, most of them to the southeast. South and west of the manor house are the remains of a set of Medieval fish ponds that were fed by the river.

There are three mounds in the parish that are the sites of former windmills. One is on a hill 560 feet (170 m) above sea level, east of the present village and just east of the trackbed of the former railway line. Another is on Charwelton Hill, 676 feet (206 m) above sea level and 3/4 mile (1.2 km) southwest of the village beside the road to Byfield. The third is on a slight hill 515 feet (157 m) above sea level and about 3/4 mile south of Charwelton.

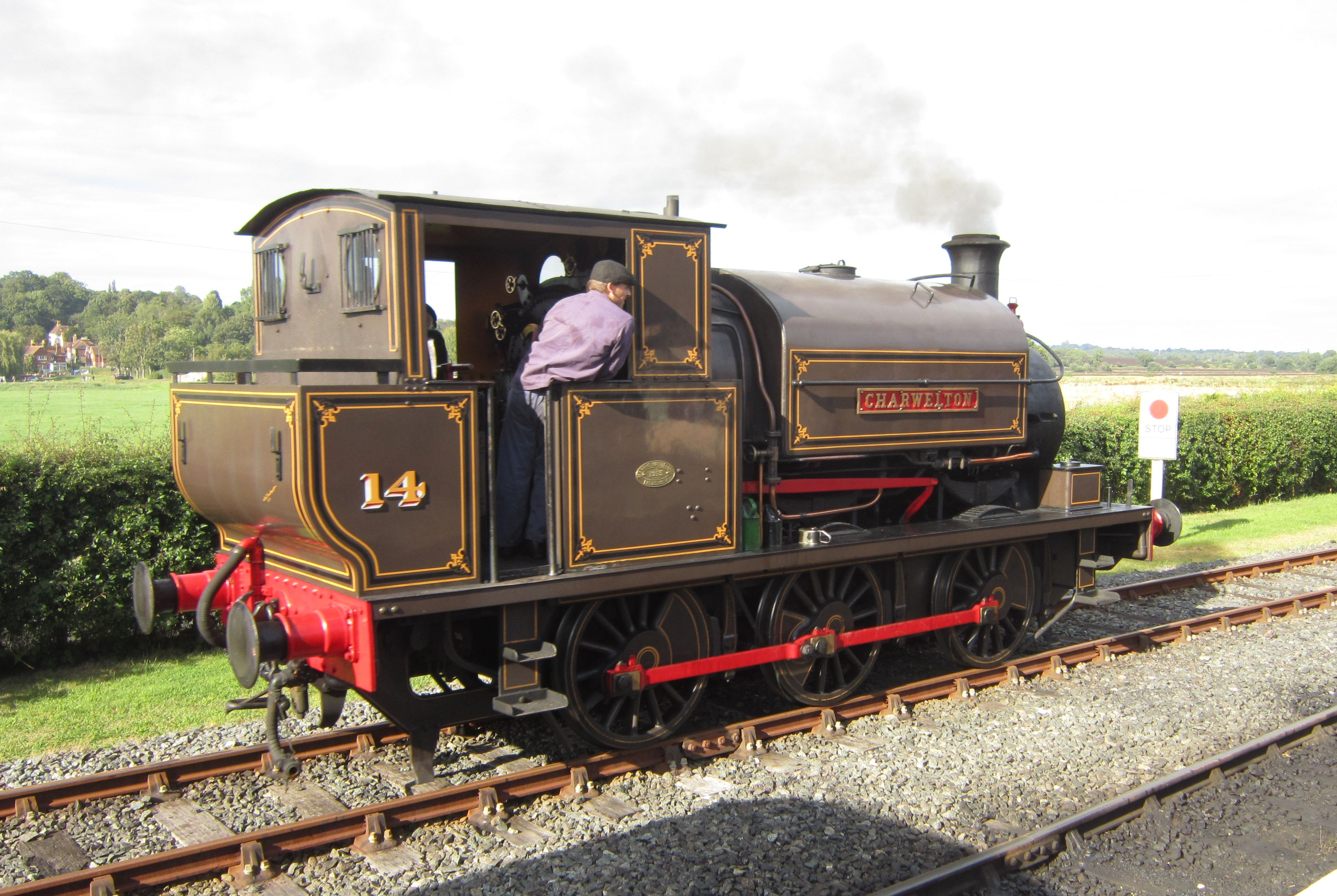
The tank engine Charwelton pulled ironstone trains from a quarry near Hellidon to Charwelton railway station from 1917 until 1942

The Great Central Main Line from Nottingham Victoria to London Marylebone was built through the parish in the 1890s and opened in March 1899. The line crossed the river between Charwelton and Church Charwelton. Charwelton railway station was built just east of the packhorse bridge. Just south of the village were Charwelton Watertroughs. British Railways closed Charwelton station in March 1963 and the line in September 1966.

From 1917 until 1961 the Park Gate Iron and Steel Company had a quarry at Cherwell Farm northwest of Charwelton village, on the northern boundary with the parish of Hellidon. From there it ran a 1.5-mile (2 km) mineral railway down the Cherwell valley to bring ironstone to the main line at Charwelton station. A tank engine called Charwelton was built for the line in 1917, worked it until 1942, and is now preserved on the Kent and East Sussex Railway.

Charwelton had a post office in Church Street. This has now closed and been turned back into a private home.

== Amenities ==
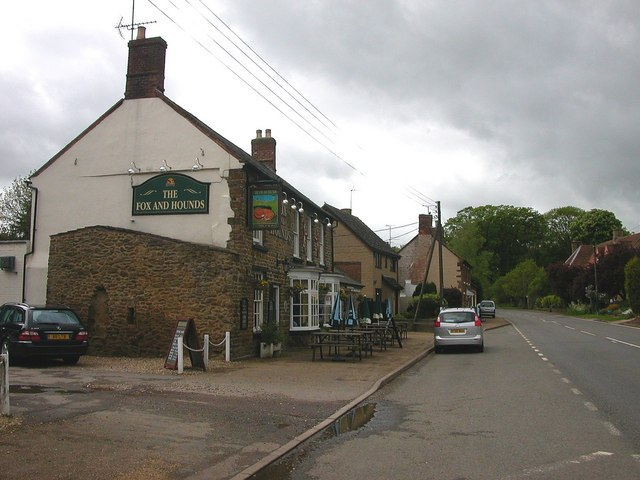
The Fox and Hounds in 2006

Charwelton has a public house, the Fox and Hounds. It closed in 2012 and in September 2013 it was sold to a property company, Family Housing Ltd of Kettering. But the company gave the village until the end of October 2013 to buy it, and villagers raised enough capital to found a co-operative society, buy the Fox and Hounds and reopen it.

== Sources ==
- Adkins, W.R.D.; Serjeantson, R.M., eds. (1902). A History of the County of Northampton. Victoria County History. Vol. 1. Westminster: Archibald Constable & Co. p. 370.
- Bridges, John (1791). Whalley, Rev. Peter (ed.). The history and antiquities of Northamptonshire. Compiled from the manuscript collections of the late learned antiquary John Bridges, Esq. Vol. I. Oxford: T Payne.
- Jervoise, Edwyn (1932). The Ancient Bridges of Mid and Eastern England. Vol. III. Westminster: The Architectural Press for the SPAB. p. 152.
- Page, W.H., ed. (1905). A History of the County of Buckingham, Volume 1. Victoria County History. Archibald Constable & Co. pp. 365–369.
- Pevsner, Nikolaus; Cherry, Bridget (1973) [1961]. Northamptonshire. The Buildings of England (revised ed.). Harmondsworth: Penguin Books. pp. 148–149. ISBN 0-14-071022-1.
- RCHME, ed. (1981). An Inventory of the Historical Monuments in the County of Northamptonshire. Vol. 3, Archaeological Sites in North-West Northamptonshire. London: Her Majesty's Stationery Office. pp. 43–47.
