= Wythmail =

- Lost settlement
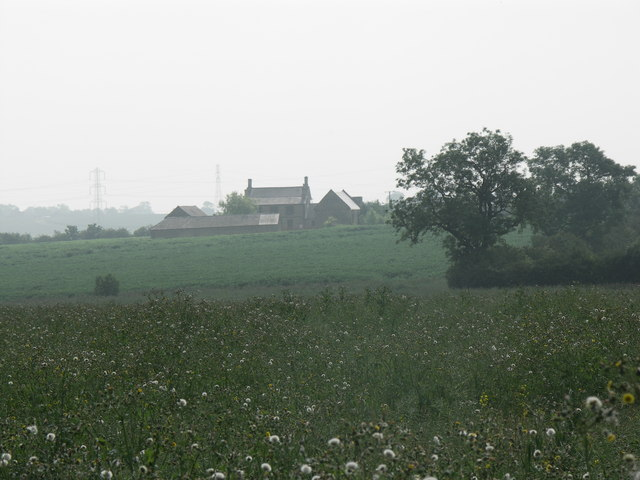
- The location of Wythmail

- Wythmail within Northamptonshire
- Coordinates: 52°20′30″N 0°46′0″W
- Country: England
- State: Northamptonshire
- Region: East Midlands
- District: North Northamptonshire
- Municipality: Orlingbury
- Map Ref: SP842721

The deserted village of Wythmail is located 4.5 miles south of Kettering in the English county of Northamptonshire. The village of Orlingbury is 1.1 miles to the east. Wythmail was part of the parish of Orlingbury.

== History ==
In the Domesday Book, it is recorded that there were 17 inhabitants in Wythmail and was assessed for 2½ hides; the village was also recorded as having a priest, however the manor was certainly included as part of Orlingbury. Records of 1220 rate the village as having 12 ploughs and it was mentioned in the Nomina Villarum of 1316. A manorial chapel was referenced here in 1357. The village was assessed in conjunction with Orlingbury in the 1334 Subsidy Returns and in the 1377 Poll Tax. By 1614 the land here had become a park which existed until 1657. By 1720 only one house was left in the village.

== What remains ==
Today there are no traces of the village to be seen, having been obliterated by modern farming methods. However traces of the earthwork outline of the village and its streets can be clearly seen on an aerial photograph of the site taken by the RAF in 1947.
