= Jurassic Way =

Long-distance footpath in England

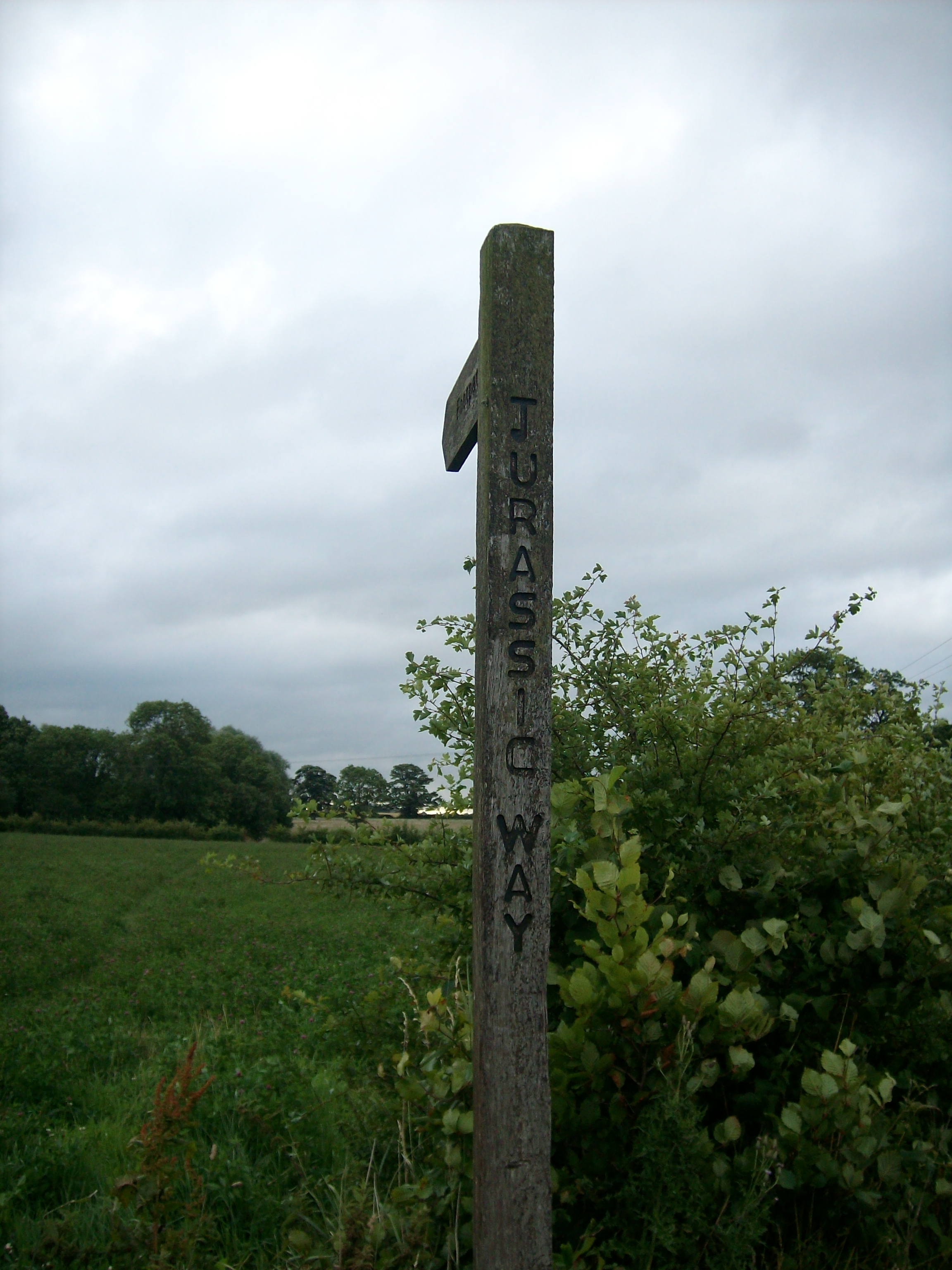
- A sign near Welford, Northamptonshire
- Length: 88 mi (142 km)
- Location: Midlands of England, United Kingdom
- Trailheads: Banbury, Oxfordshire; 52.057°N 1.330°W; Stamford, Lincolnshire; 52.6505°N 0.4809°W
- Use: Hiking
- Season: All year

The Jurassic Way is a designated and signed long-distance footpath that connects the Oxfordshire town of Banbury with the Lincolnshire town of Stamford in England. It largely follows an ancient ridgeway traversing Britain; most of its 88-mile (142 km) route is in Northamptonshire on the Jurassic limestone ridge in the north of that county.

The trail goes near the Oxford and Grand Union canals, past the Great Central Railway's Catesby Tunnel and viaduct, the River Welland, the 82-arch viaduct at Harringworth, and Rockingham Castle.

It connects with these long-distance footpaths:

- Grand Union Canal Walk,
- Hereward Way,
- Macmillan Ways,
- Midshires Way,
- Oxford Canal Walk.

The ancient trackway on which the Jurassic Way is based likely continued at each end, particularly following the Lincoln Cliff towards the Humber estuary.
