= Low Coniscliffe =

Village in County Durham, England

Coordinates: 54.519°N 1.617°W

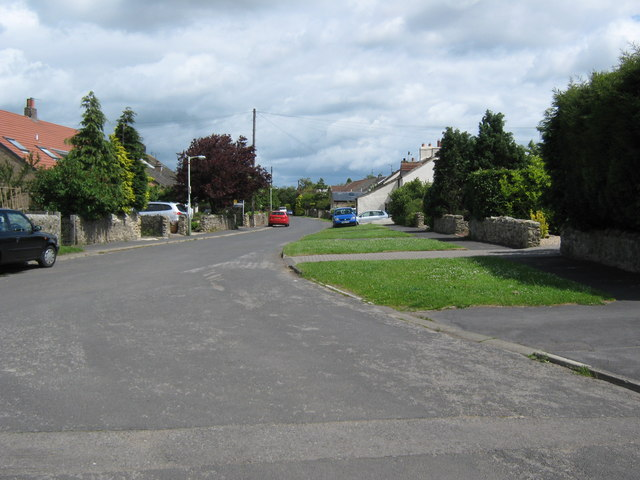
- West end of village

- Location within County Durham
- Population: 716 (2011)
- OS grid reference: NZ247137
- Unitary authority: Darlington
- Ceremonial county: County Durham
- Region: North East
- Country: England
- Sovereign state: United Kingdom
- Post town: DARLINGTON
- Postcode district: DL2
- Dialling code: 01325
- Police: Durham
- Fire: County Durham and Darlington
- Ambulance: North East
- UK Parliament: Sedgefield

Low Coniscliffe is a village in the civil parish of Low Coniscliffe and Merrybent, in County Durham, England. The population of the civil parish taken at the 2011 Census was 716. It is situated 3 miles (5 km) west of Darlington. Its present built-up area is confined in practice between the A1, the A67 and the Tees, but its old boundaries probably extend much further. The village contains a couple of listed buildings and the probable site of a medieval manor house. There was once a gallows in the village. A rare fungus Rhodotus palmatus was found nearby.

== Geographical and political ==
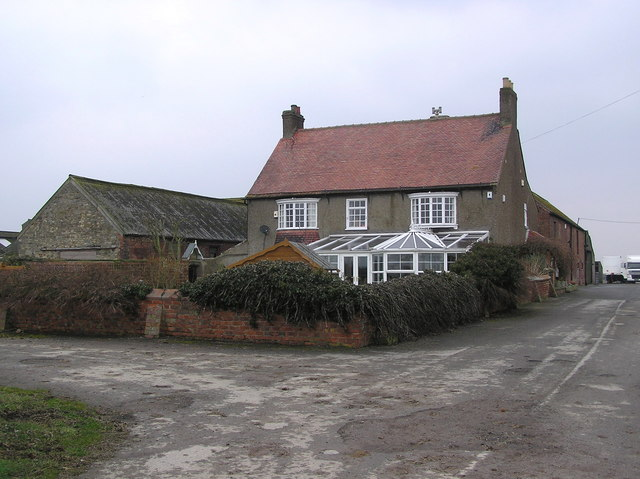
Coniscliffe Grange Farm

The local geology of Permian rocks includes limestone, chalk, gypsum and salt: all liable to be soluble or karstic, and these can cause subsidence and caves in some places, although not necessarily in Low Coniscliffe. The village is situated along the north bank of the River Tees, 1.5 miles (2.4 km) east of its parish church at High Coniscliffe and 3 miles (5 km) west of Darlington. Apart from the Baydale Beck pub on the A67, Low Coniscliffe is now mostly a fairly new estate within a small triangle formed by the River Tees to the south and east, the A1 road to the west and the A67 road to the north. Beyond these boundaries to the east is Broken Scar waterworks and Darlington, and fields and small villages in other directions.

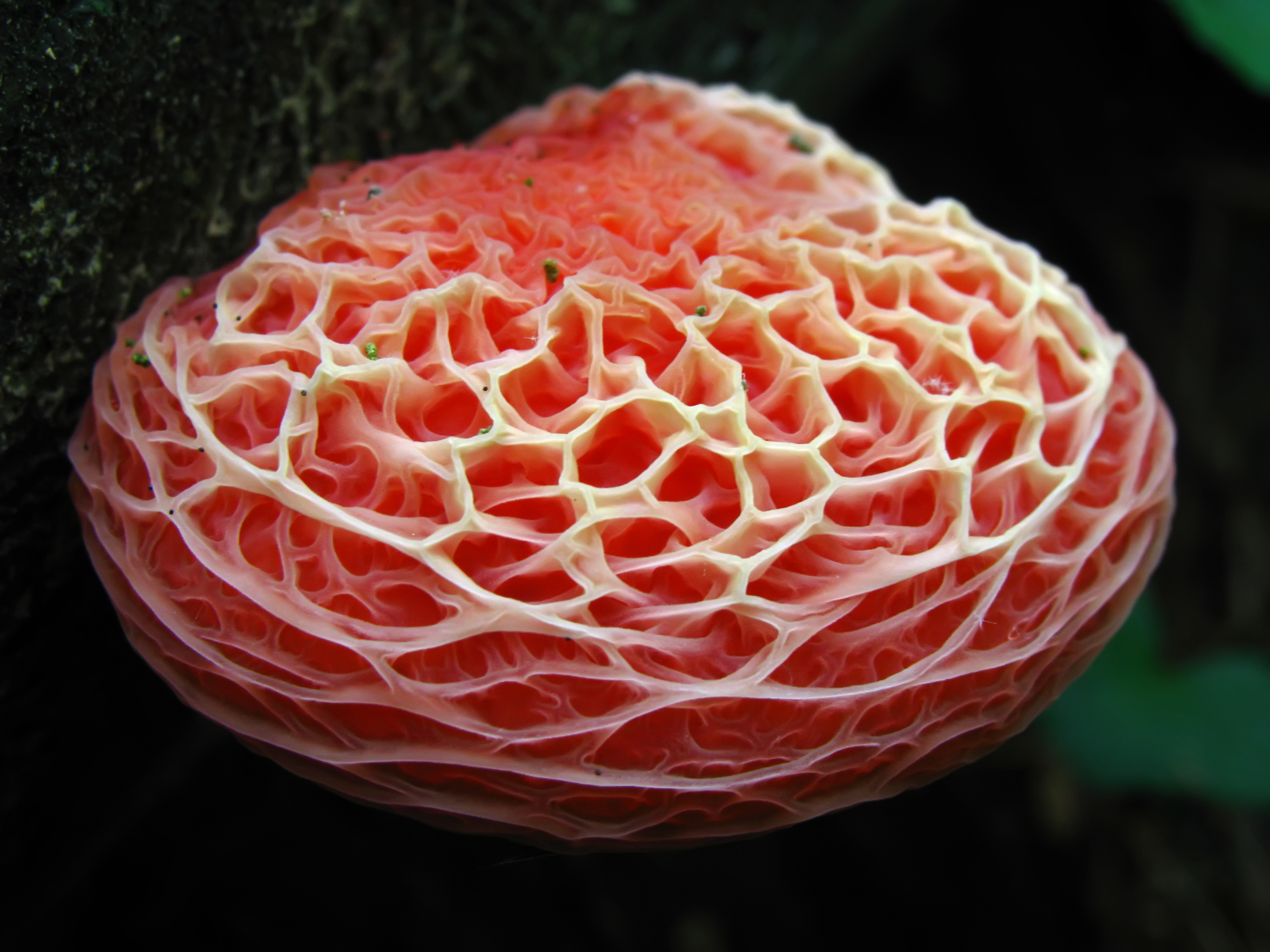
Rhodotus palmatus was seen locally, 1993

Possible earlier boundaries could have been the Tees to the south, Ulnaby Beck to the west, Baydale Beck to the east and Cocker Beck to the north. Cocker Beck encloses Thornton Hall in the parish. The inhabitants of the hall, the Tailbois, Thorntons, Bowes and Honeywoods, have been associated with Low Coniscliffe in the past. The nearest village is Merrybent to the north−west, and the highest point is Coniscliffe Grange at the north end of the parish.

In 1762 the village had a turnpike gate. In the 1891 census Low Coniscliffe included Coniscliffe Grange, Dublar Castle and East Farm, and there was a Badle Beck Inn which is probably the current Baydale Beck Inn. The village was not affected by the flooding of 2007, but lost power for one morning. Chenopodium glaucum, or oak−leaved goosefoot, was found here in 1930, and Yellow Star of Bethlehem was found in 1942. The rare fungus Rhodotus palmatus was found in the area in 1993.

== History ==
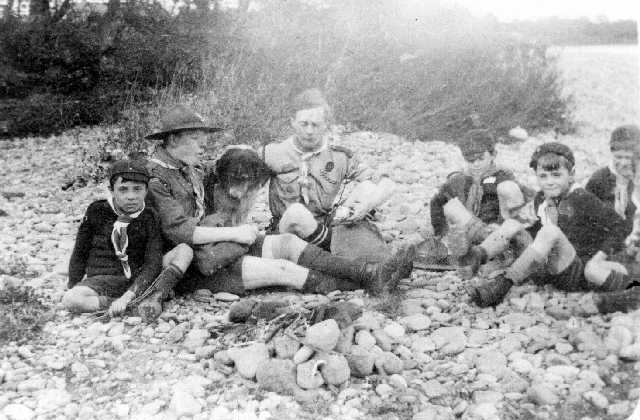
Scouts and Cubs picnicking possibly at Broken Scar c. 1920

A foundling was abandoned on 31 January 1602 on the window ledge of a house in Nether Cunsley which was occupied by Cuthbert Smith. The child, who lived for 69 years until 21 December 1671, was baptised Tychicus, with no surname. The inhabitants of Thornton Hall were associated with Lowe Coniscliffe. Sir Francis Bowes, who was born in 1648 and became High Sheriff of Northumberland, lost most of his family during his lifetime and left a memorial to them in the parish church at High Coniscliffe. In 1848 the village had 134 inhabitants. Arthur Pease of Darlington gave instructions in 1877 for the building of the British School for 105 pupils. Scouts and Cubs used to come to the banks of the Tees near here in the 1920s for picnics.

== Archaeological sites and finds ==
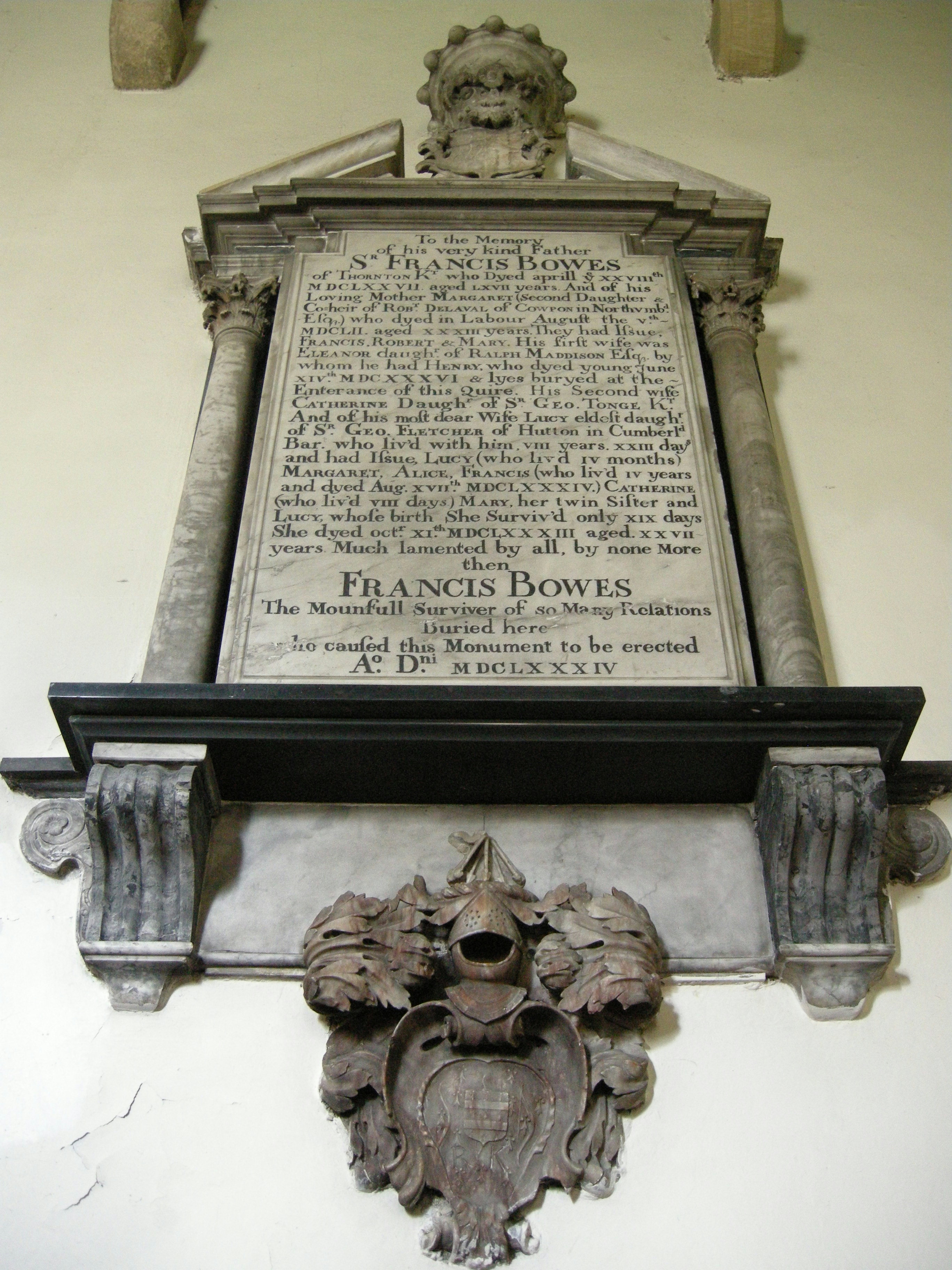
Bowes memorial

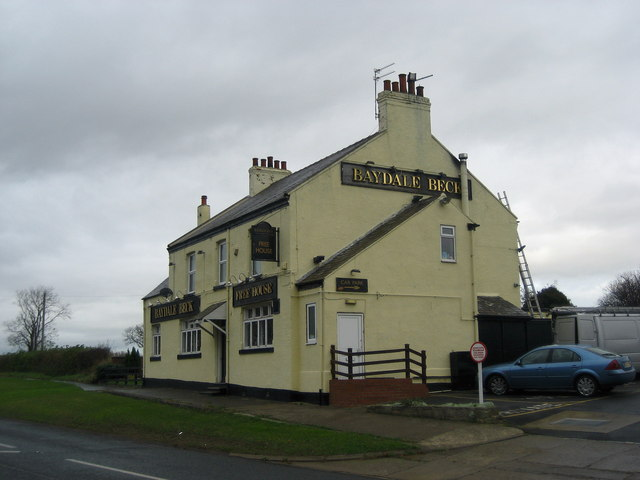
Baydale Beck Inn

A Palaeolithic axehead was found somewhere in the area. Roman coins were found in 1856 and 1978 in Cocker Beck, and the later finds were dated 308–346 AD. Bishop Bek ordered a tower to be built in Low Coniscliffe in the 13th century; the site is unknown, but it may be the site of the manor house. There is an unknown site of a gallows, pre−1293 AD, south of the Tees, and west of Howden Hill Farm. The extreme south−west end of the present built−up area of the village is probably the site of the old medieval manor house, 1066–1540. The site includes earthwork enclosures, and a 1960s excavation revealed a 15th–16th century round dovecote. There is supposed to be another dovecote here; location unknown. The house at the south−west end of the village, numbers 55–57, is a 17th-century listed building: a roughcast brick and rubble structure with a pantiled roof. This is a pair of houses; once a farmhouse with a cottage on the right. Well Bank House, number 20 near the south−east corner of the village, is a listed building dated around the late 18th to early 19th century. Like numbers 55–57 it is built of roughcast rubble with a pantiled roof, and this building contains a 19th-century iron range.

== Low Coniscliffe today ==
It is now a dormitory village for Darlington, and there is no school; the nearest post office is at Mowden Park in Darlington. The Baydale Beck Inn serves real ale and permits dogs in the bar.

Just to the east of the village is Tees Cottage Pumping Station, a Victorian pumping station now opened as a museum containing a 1904-built rotative beam engine, and a 1914 gas engine, believed to be the largest working preserved example in Europe.
