= Carlbury =

Village in County Durham, England

Coordinates: 54.537°N 1.669°W

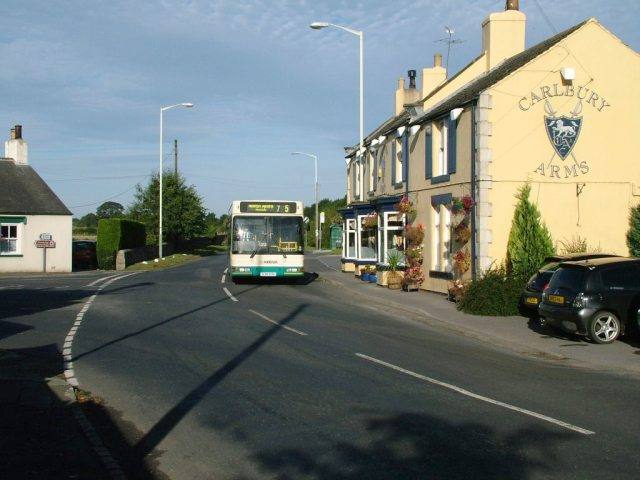
- Carlbury Arms

- Location within County Durham
- OS grid reference: NZ215155
- Civil parish: High Coniscliffe
- Unitary authority: Darlington
- Ceremonial county: County Durham
- Region: North East
- Country: England
- Sovereign state: United Kingdom
- Post town: DARLINGTON
- Postcode district: DL2
- Dialling code: 01325
- Police: Durham
- Fire: County Durham and Darlington
- Ambulance: North East
- UK Parliament: Sedgefield

Carlbury is a hamlet in the civil parish of High Coniscliffe in County Durham, in England. It is situated a few miles to the west of Darlington, on the north bank of the River Tees between Piercebridge to the west, and High Coniscliffe to the east. High and Low Carlbury once constituted a slightly larger settlement, but most of the hamlet at Low Carlbury became derelict and was demolished by the late 1940s. A few buildings remain.

== History ==
In 1320 Carlbury was given by the widow of Sir John FitzMarmaduke, Sheriff of North Durham, to Sir Thomas Earl of Lancaster and Leicester. After Sir Thomas was executed for treason in 1322, Carlbury went back to the widow's family and thence to the House of Neville.

Carlbury consisted historically of High and Low Carlbury and was included with Summerhouse and Ulnaby in the estate of the Nevilles in their capacity as Earls of Westmorland from 1354 to 1601, being mentioned in a 1553 document. However Charles Neville forfeited it in 1571 for his part in the Rising of the North. Queen Elizabeth I granted it to Ralph Taylboys or Tailboys of Thornton Hall in 1573; it was then left to Thomas Jenison in 1580 and to William Jenison in 1588. Carlbury still belonged to the Jenisons in 1616. The estate later came into the hands of Childers Welbank Childers of York, who sold it to London merchant George Bainbridge who was born in 1740. At that time Carlbury maintained its own roads and its own poor independently of the parish. Workers by the names of Kipling in the 18th century and Cowley in the 19th century are recorded.

An old spelling of the name of this area was Kerleburie. Between the 16th and 19th centuries, Carlbury was well-populated with families of numerous surnames. By the 19th century it was a hamlet at the foot of Carlbury Bank, served by the Piercebridge railway station which was on the NER Darlington and Barnard Castle railway (1858–1964). In the hamlet was the Railway Inn, the fairly large Bridge House, and Carlbury's own bridge over Dyance Beck, which in turn powered Carlbury Mill. The mill burned down at night in 1889, discovered by a hapless cyclist who, despite great effort by telegraph from Piercebridge and then by pedalling to Darlington, was unable to raise the fire brigade in time to save the mill. The hamlet was mostly derelict by 1939, and all but a few buildings were demolished after World War II in the 1940s before the A67 was built.

=== Carlbury Hill and Carlbury Hall ===
During the Civil War on 1 December 1642 a contingent of Royalists, led by the Earl of Newcastle and travelling south along Dere Street, met a group of Parliamentarians, led by Captain Hotham and travelling north, in a dispute over the bridge at Piercebridge. The Royalists won the day by erecting a battery on Carlbury Hill, which higher position had an advantage over the opposition's battery on the other side of the river. Cannonballs and human bones from this battleground have been found on the banks of the river. On 9 December 1672, Jane Hill fell from the hill and died four days afterwards.

In 1875 on that same Carlbury Hill, architect John Ross built Carlbury Hall in Scots baronial style for National Provincial Bank manager Thomas McLachlan; McLachlan is said to have chosen the site where the view of the River Tees would remind him of Scotland. By 1905 Carlbury Hall was in the hands of James Backhouse Dale (born 1855), a company director of Hordern Collieries Ltd, and between 1909 and 1929 it was owned by John Henry Pease, a member of Cleveland Naturalists' Field Club. In 2003 it sold for £535,000.

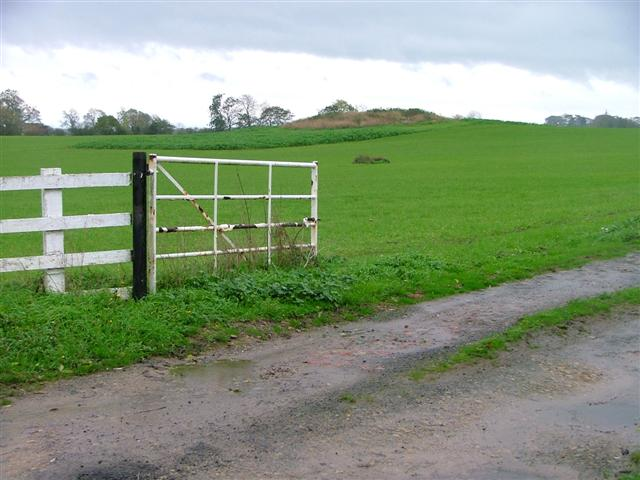
Smotherlaw Barrow

=== Archaeology ===
Smotherlaw Barrow is a scheduled monument which was thought to be the site of a castle in 1902, although by 1992 it was understood to be an elongated mound without a ditch, reduced by ploughing and probably a Bronze Age burial mound. Mortaria dated around 170–180 AD with painted inscriptions have been found in Carlbury Vale west, and they could be associated with Piercebridge Roman Fort.

== Carlbury today ==
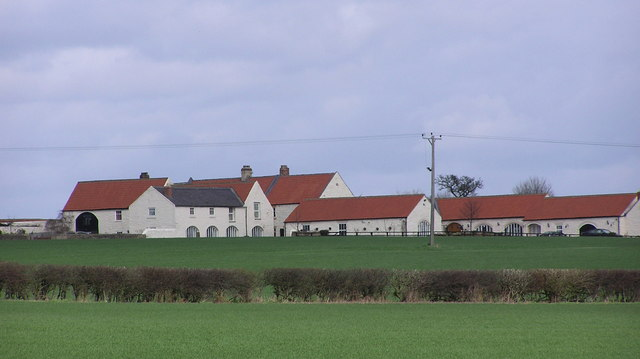
High Carlbury Farm

In 2005–2006, Carlbury still had 3.5 hectares of ancient woodland, classified as a Site of Nature Conservation Importance and a wildlife corridor. Today High Carlbury is Carlbury Farm, and the remainder of Low Carlbury is next to the A67 road where there is Carlbury Hall. For a short time in the early 21st century this was a nursing home on Carlbury Hill. Also on the A67 is the Carlbury Arms which is listed by CAMRA and has a pudding club, and the Carlbury milestone which is Grade II listed but said to be in poor condition. However, in 2005 Darlington Council saw fit to upgrade the bus shelters at the Carlbury Arms and Carlbury Hall stops. Carlbury Garden Centre is north of the Carlbury Arms, on Station Road. Between the milestone and the river there is a field and a little bridge over stone channels where the mill race once was; Carlbury Bridge is now a Grade II listed building. The hamlet is on the Piercebridge Circular Walk route.

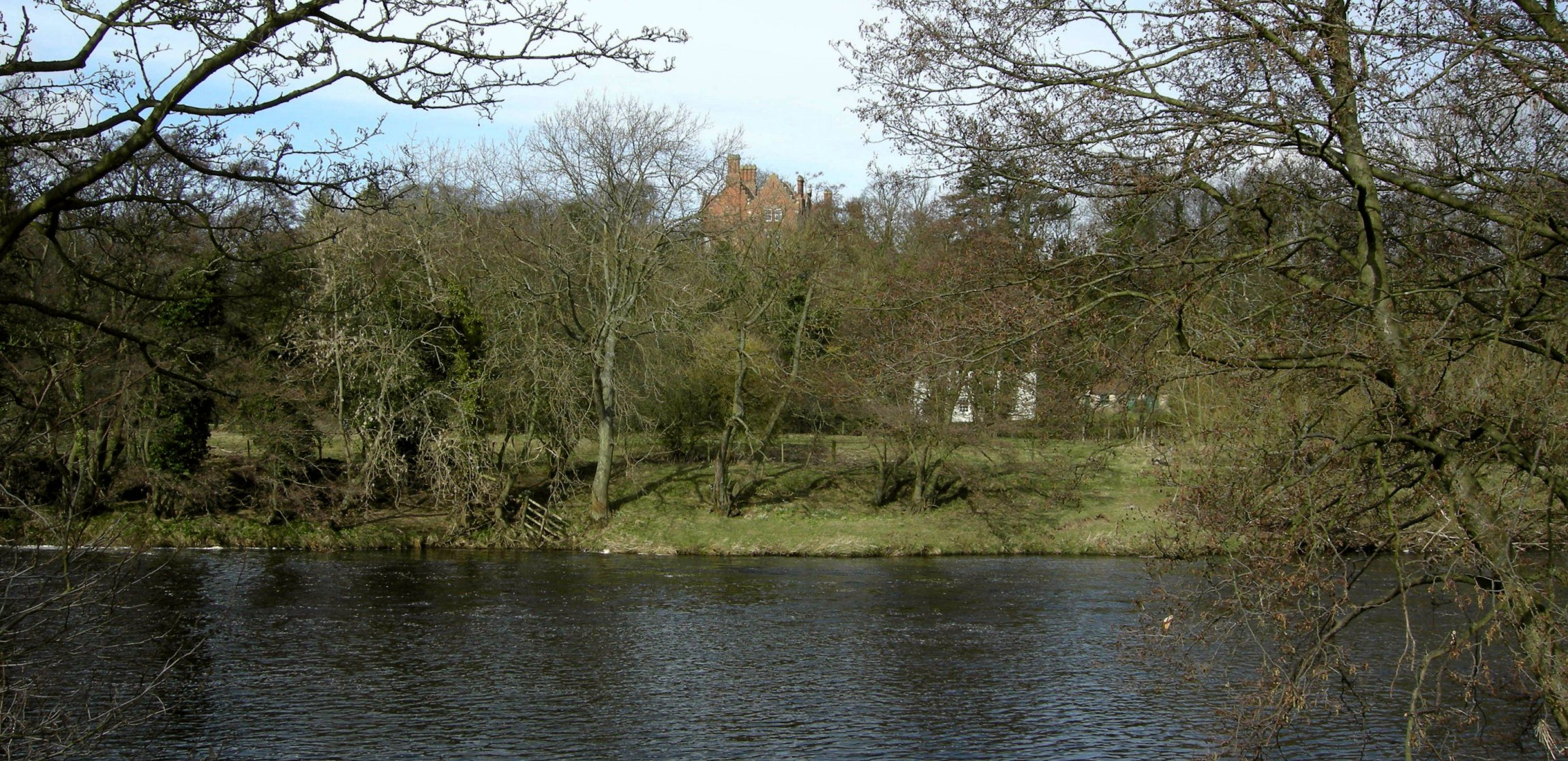
Carlbury Hill, site of English Civil War cannon emplacement, viewed from south bank of River Tees. Carlbury Hall (b. 1875) can be seen on top.

== See also ==
- Abandoned village
- Deserted medieval village
- List of lost settlements in the United Kingdom
