= Tees Cottage Pumping Station =

Coordinates: 54.52034°N 1.60582°W

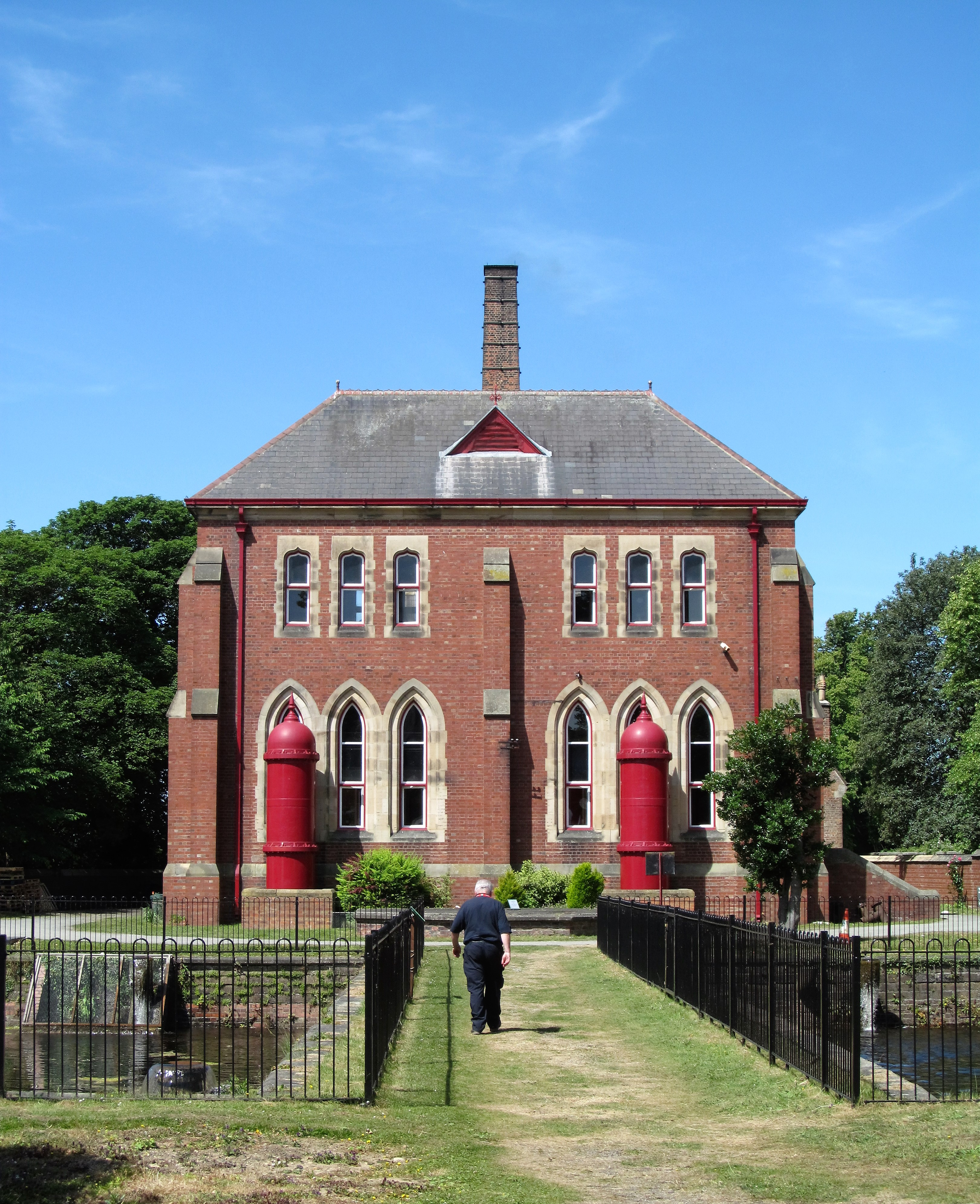
Tees Cottage Pumping Station: the 1904 beam engine house and filter beds.

Tees Cottage Pumping Station is a Victorian pumping station complex at Broken Scar on the A67 near Low Coniscliffe just west of Darlington. The site dates from 1849, and was built to provide drinking water for Darlington and the surrounding area. It is a scheduled monument housing two completely original pumping engines in fully working order: a 1904 beam engine, built by Teasdale Brothers of Darlington, which is still steamed using its original 1902 Lancashire boilers; and a rare 1914 two-cylinder gas internal-combustion engine, the largest such engine surviving in Europe. Both engines can be seen in operation on certain weekends through the year, using their original pumps to pump water from the River Tees into the adjacent filter beds.

== Origin of the site ==
The Darlington Gas and Water Company was incorporated by an act of Parliament, the Darlington Gas and Waterworks Act 1849 (12 & 13 Vict. c. viii), on 11 May 1849. The shareholders of the company included Edmund Backhouse, Alfred Kitching, Henry Pease, Joseph Pease and other prominent townsmen. The company engineer was Thomas Hawksley.

The company had secured permission to extract water from the River Tees, and came to an arrangement with George Thomas Allan of Blackwell Grange to build a waterworks on part of his Tees Cottage estate, located on the north bank of the river, two miles west of the town. Within a year of the act of Parliament being passed, the waterworks had been built to Hawksley's designs and was supplying water to the town.

== Preserved engines ==
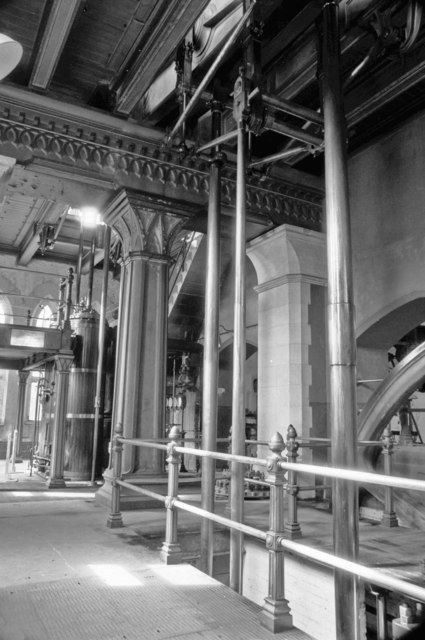
The 1904 beam engine (photographed in 1983).

The Tees Cottage site has been preserved in much the same state as it was when the waterworks closed in 1980. Visitors normally enter at the easternmost corner, from Coniscliffe Road. The site, which is enclosed behind a brick wall, includes preserved pumping engines dating from 1904 (steam-powered), 1914 (gas-powered) and 1926 (electric), together with other items of waterworks infrastructure.

Linked to each engine were river pumps and town pumps: the river pumps drew water out of the River Tees and pumped it into the filter beds; the town pumps conveyed filtered water from Tees Cottage to the reservoirs which supplied the town.

=== 1904 Beam engine ===
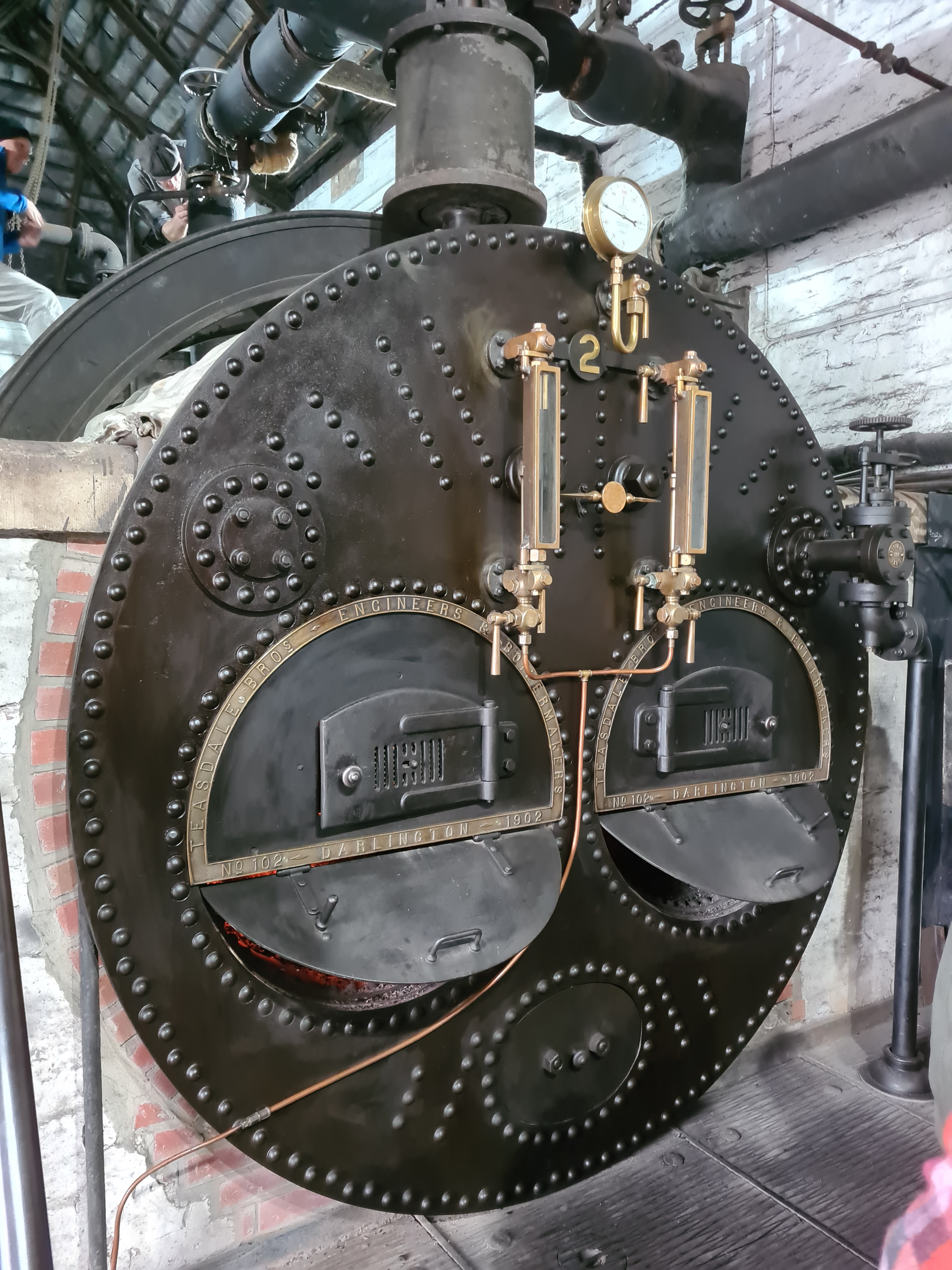
The No. 2 boiler of 1902.

The 1904 engine was one of the last waterworks beam engines ever built, and as such may be seen as representing the pinnacle of beam engine pumping development. It is a rotative, two-cylinder Woolf compound engine, designed by Glenfield and Kennedy of Kilmarnock and built by Teasdale Bros, under T & C Hawksley, Civil Engineers, London. The beam is just over 30 feet (9.1 m) long, weighing 25 tons; the flywheel is 21 feet (6.4 m) in diameter, and the high- and low-pressure cylinders measure 18" and 29" respectively (46 cm and 74 cm).

A pair of coal-fired Lancashire boilers were installed in 1902 (one of which would be in use and the other on standby at any one time). Each holds 3,000 gallons of water.

The engine ran almost continuously from 1904 to 1926, when new electric pumps were commissioned; thereafter it remained on operational standby until the mid-1950s, and continued to be run one day each year, on the order of the Borough Engineer, until at least 1968.

=== 1914 Gas engine ===
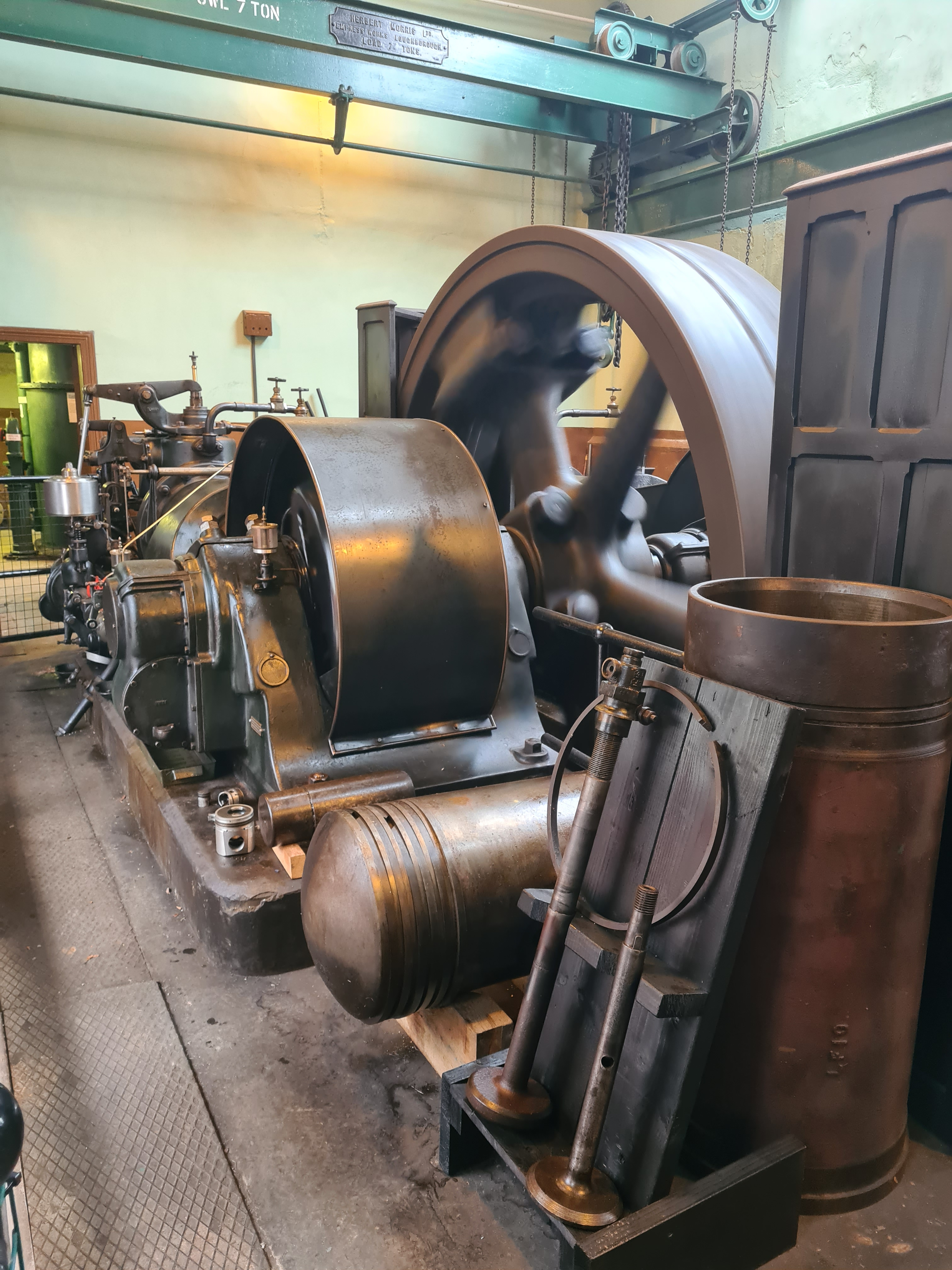
The 1914 Hornsby & Sons gas engine (with a spare piston displayed in the foreground).

The 1914 engine is by Richard Hornsby & Sons of Grantham, with pumps by Hathorn Davey & Co. of Leeds, all housed in a building of 1853 (which previously accommodated an earlier steam engine). It presently runs on mains gas, but originally used producer gas from an adjacent plant on site (also by Hornsby & Sons). The producer plant is still in situ and open to the public; however it suffered at least two explosions over the years, evidence of which is still clearly visible, and it is no longer operational. (It was decommissioned in 1955, following an explosion said to have been caused by a bird's nest in the vent pipe).

Compressed air, used to start the engine, was provided by a small Hornsby & Sons petrol-driven compressor. This was also linked via line shafting (which could also be driven from the drive shaft to the pumps) to a Westinghouse generator, which provided electricity for the various buildings around the site.

=== 1926 Electric motors ===
A pair of electric pump sets, which used to pump water across the road to the filtration plant.

In 1926 two sets of electrically powered centrifugal pumps were installed (one for river water, one for treated water), which ran until 1980. Further pumps were added over time; they remain in situ and are on public view. The pumps originally worked in conjunction with a set of 35 rapid pressure filters, installed on the north side of Coniscliffe Road, which used alum as a flocculant. More filters were added in subsequent years.

Each pump was independently driven by its own motor. As seen today, the installation consists of four river pumps (aligned vertically), one town pump (there were formerly three) and a pair of pumps to feed the pressure filters. The motors were manufactured by the Lancashire Dynamo & Motor Company (later known as Lancashire Dynamo & Crypto).

At the westernmost end of the site was a building which housed the electricity substation for the supply to the pumps; having had its equipment removed, it currently serves as the train shed for the miniature railway which operates around the site.

== Earlier engines ==
When the site opened, it was served by a single beam engine housed in a building at the west end of the site. A second beam engine was added soon afterwards in a building at the opposite end of the site; between them lay a pair of filter ponds. The mid-19th century buildings remain in place but the engines they were built for have since been removed.

=== West pump house ===
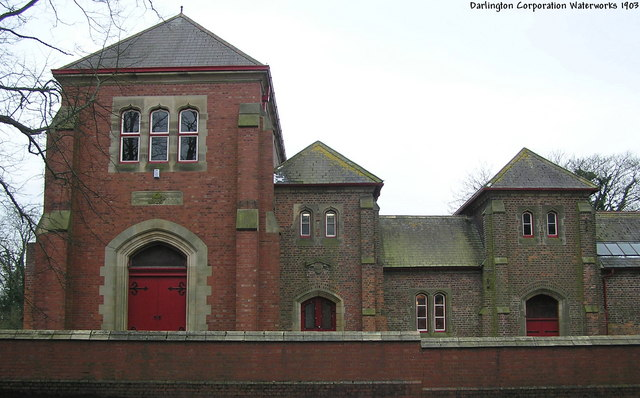
The 1904 beam engine house (left) with (l-r) 1849 engine house, 1849 pump house, second engine house, 1849 boiler house.

In June 1849 the Darlington Gas and Water Company issued an invitation to tender for 'the erection of an Engine House, Boiler House, Chimney, two Filter Beds, Tank and other Works therewith connected'. It also sought tenders for supplying 'a 27 inch double-powered Condensing Engine of 5 feet stroke with boilers, pumps, air vessels and other apparatus and appendages complete'. Gilkes Wilson and Company of Middlesbrough were selected to provide the engine.

The engine house still stands, together with its adjacent pump house and a twin engine house on the other side (which was originally left empty). Further to the west, a pair of Cornish boilers were installed to provide steam for the engine; these were replaced with a pair of Lancashire boilers in 1865 (when the engine was upgraded).

By the end of the 19th century it was felt that the engines on site were approaching the end of their working lives. Hawksley & Co drew up specifications for a new beam engine and boilers (and new buildings in which to house them), which went out to tender in 1900: the new boiler house would be constructed immediately alongside its predecessor (to the south), and the new engine house likewise (to the east). There were, however, a number of delays, and while the boilers were in place by 1902 (providing steam for the 1849 engine), the engine was not completed until 1904. Once the new engine was operational the older engines were only required at times of peak demand.

The 1849 engine remained in service on this basis until 1907, when (as it was in need of costly repairs) it was replaced by a Fielding gas engine. This was housed in the empty engine house to the west of the old pump house, where it worked the pumps that had previously been driven by the old beam engine (the pumps having also been upgraded in 1865). It ran off producer gas (the producer plant was set up in the old boiler house).

In 1908, the decision was taken to remove the old beam engine and sell it for scrap. In 1926 the Fielding gas engine was likewise removed, together with its pumps, to make way for the new electric installation.

=== East pump house ===
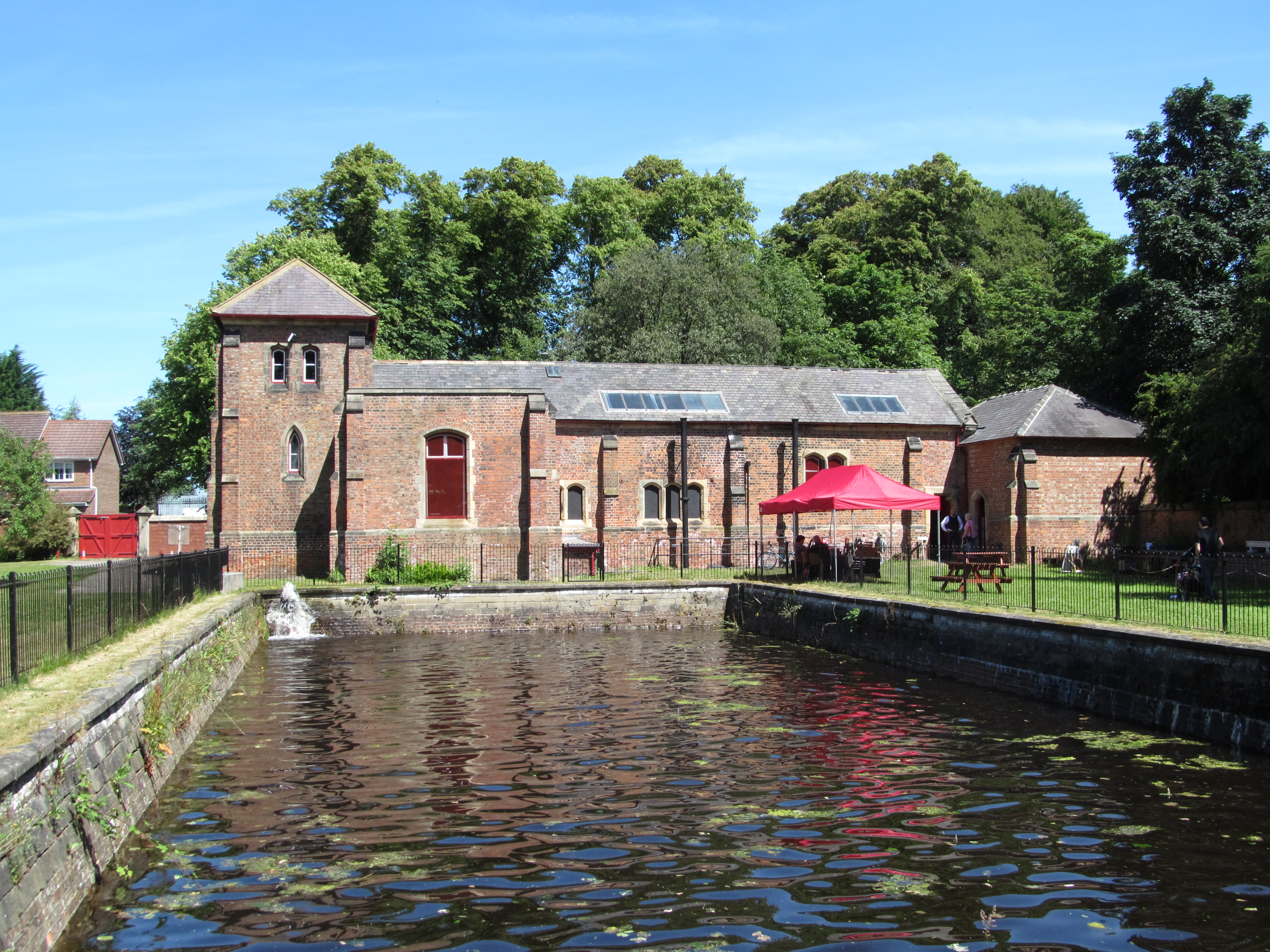
Looking across a filter bed to the gas engine house. This building, dating from 1853, originally housed (left-right) a beam engine, pumps, boilers and a coal store.

In 1851, an act of Parliament authorised the newly-formed Stockton, Middlesbrough and Yarm Water Company (SMYWC) to pay the Darlington company to provide fresh water for Teesside from the Tees Cottage works. In 1852, tenders were sought for erecting another engine and engine house, and two more filter beds, to help meet this increased demand. The new engine, built by Gilkes, Wilson & Co, was first put to steam on 15 September 1853; a shaft attached to the flywheel of the engine drove (via a complicated system of gearing and cranks) a set of horizontal pumps in the basement of the adjacent pump room.

Following an outbreak of cholera, Parliament passed the Darlington Local Board Act 1854 (17 & 18 Vict. c. clxxxi), which required the Darlington Gas and Water Company to sell its Darlington waterworks to the local board of health; at the same time the east pump house, together with its engine and filter beds, was sold to the SMYWC. In 1860, however, the Stockton, Middlesbrough and Yarm Water Company built two new engines on the other side of Coniscliffe Road (the present-day site of Northumbrian Water's Broken Scar Water Treatment Works); whereupon the 1853 engine and pump house were repurchased by the Darlington Local Board to help meet its own increasing supply needs.

By 1911 the 1853 engine was showing its age, and the decision was taken to replace it with a gas engine (albeit a much larger and more powerful one than the Fielding engine, installed a few years earlier at the other end of the site). By 1914 the old engine, pumps and boilers had all been removed to make way for the new gas engine (they were sold as scrap to Teasdale Bros).

== Ancillary buildings and structures ==
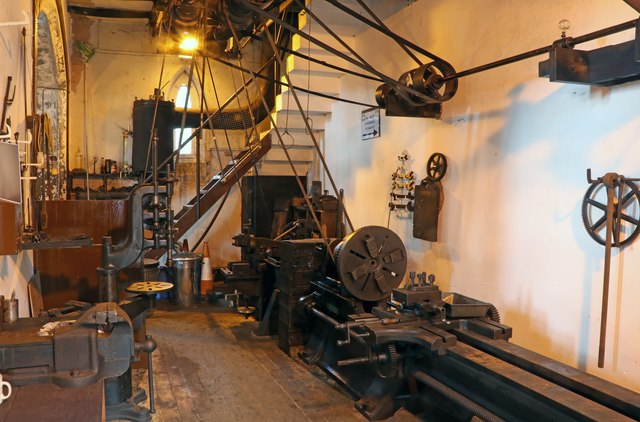
The machine shop is equipped with tools including a lathe, grinder, drill and shaper.

A machine tool workshop has survived, complete with belt-driven line shafts; it was installed c. 1908 in the 1849 engine house (after the engine had been removed). There is also an on-site blacksmith's forge, dating from 1855, which is often fired up and demonstrated on open days. These were originally used for on-site repairs and maintenance of parts and equipment.

Three of the four original filter ponds are also extant, along with a pair of covered 'clear water tanks' (where filtered water was held). As originally arranged, the filtered water was pumped to an 800,000 gallon reservoir on Bushell Hill near Mowden, from where it was gravity fed to the town. Additional filter beds were constructed, to the north of Coniscliffe Road, in the 1870s.

A dwelling house was provided on site for the Superintendent of the works; it now houses a tea-room for visitors.

== The site and its significance ==
In 1974 the waterworks came under the control of the new Northumbrian regional water authority (which would later be privatised as Northumbrian Water). The merger placed the Tees Cottage and Broken Scar works under the same ownership for the first time. Broken Scar was the more modern installation, having been upgraded in 1955 and expanded in 1972. The decision was therefore made to supply Darlington with water from Broken Scar, rather than Tees Cottage, and the change took place in 1979. Tees Cottage Pumping Station was closed the following year, and placed in the care of a Preservation Trust. (The site is still owned by Northumbrian Water, which continues to supply Darlington from its Broken Scar works, just across the A67 road from Tees Cottage).

Tees Cottage is one of 2 sites in Britain (the other being Kew Bridge) which shows all 3 forms of water pumping (steam, internal combustion, electric). The significance of the site was summarised thus by local historian H. C. Devonshire:

"Tees Cottage really is unique. An analysis of 115 other sites in England, Scotland and Wales ... shows that while 50% of them have one or more engines in steam, very few are on their original site and using their original boilers, and only one on the listing, a gasworks exhauster engine in Scotland, can still do its original duty. Given that Tees Cottage also has what is believed to be the largest working preserved gas engine in Europe and still has all the electric pumps and switch gear from 1926, and still pumps water as intended, this station is a very rare opportunity for future generations to study not only the total history of water pumping and engines but also the totality of life in the Victorian and Edwardian era in a complete and original context".

== See also ==
- Ryhope Engines Museum for another working example of preserved waterworks beam engines in County Durham.
