= Ulnaby =

Deserted village in County Durham, England

Coordinates: 54.553966°N 1.649818°W

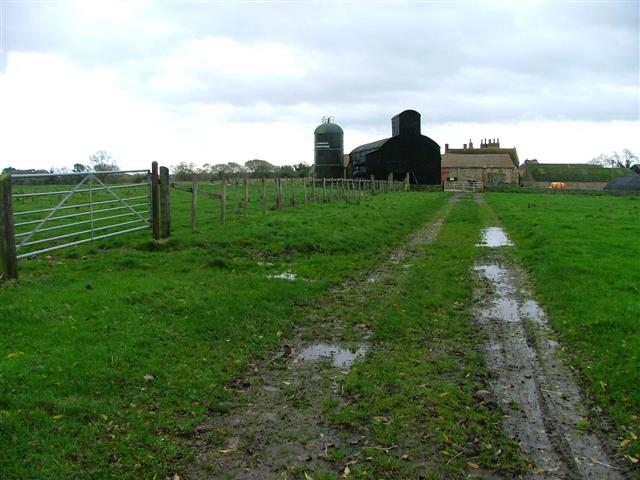
- Ulnaby Hall Farm, site of lost village

- Location within County Durham
- Area: 0.16 km^{2} (0.062 sq mi)
- Population: 0
  - Density: 0/km^{2} (0/sq mi)
- OS grid reference: NZ226172
- Unitary authority: Darlington
- Ceremonial county: County Durham
- Region: North East
- Country: England
- Sovereign state: United Kingdom
- Post town: DARLINGTON
- Postcode district: DL2
- Dialling code: 01325
- Police: Durham
- Fire: County Durham and Darlington
- Ambulance: North East
- UK Parliament: Sedgefield

Ulnaby is an abandoned village and scheduled ancient monument in the grounds of Ulnaby Hall Farm, near High Coniscliffe, County Durham, England. The toft village was occupied from the late-13th to the 16th century and temporary buildings were erected in the 19th century. Ulnaby Hall farm appears to have been built in the late-16th century, supplanting a high status medieval manorial enclosure associated with the original village. It is thought that the village shrank because of the change from labour-intensive arable farming to pasture, before being abandoned and the site was subsumed into the farm as pasture.

== Location ==
The site is 6.8 km north-west of Darlington, in the grounds of Ulnaby Hall Farm, between Ulnaby Lane and the B6279, near High Coniscliffe, County Durham. The earthworks cover an area of 0.16 km^{2} under pasture, with the actual village covering 6.6 hectares. There are ridge and furrow areas to the north and west. There is visible evidence of two east–west rows of tofts either side of an east–west hollow way, and on the north side of the hollow way is the village green. The site, which slopes gently to the south, is bounded by roads on the north and west sides, and a stream to the south. Beneath the pasture the archaeology is on boulder clay overlying the Magnesian Limestone. Three fields make up the site: an 1841 document says that the western field was called Back Field, the eastern field was Garths and the southern field was New Acridge Carr. The fields immediately to the west of the site were called Kiln Field and Lime Kiln Field, and there is evidence of quarrying in Back Field. A garth in this context is an enclosed garden, yard or paddock, and would refer to the existing earthworks. Carr refers to marshland in the context of old pasture.

== History ==
=== Context ===
The name, "Ulnaby", is possibly derived from the Old Norse for Ulfhethin's farm, which could imply that there was a pre-medieval settlement locally. Although archaeologists have not found reason to date the village itself before medieval times, there is local evidence of worked flints, a Bronze Age awl, three late Neolithic or early Bronze Age bowl barrows and the Roman road Dere Street, all within 3 kilometres. Roman items have been found locally at High Carlbury, High Coniscliffe and Ulnaby farm itself.

=== Village and manor occupation ===
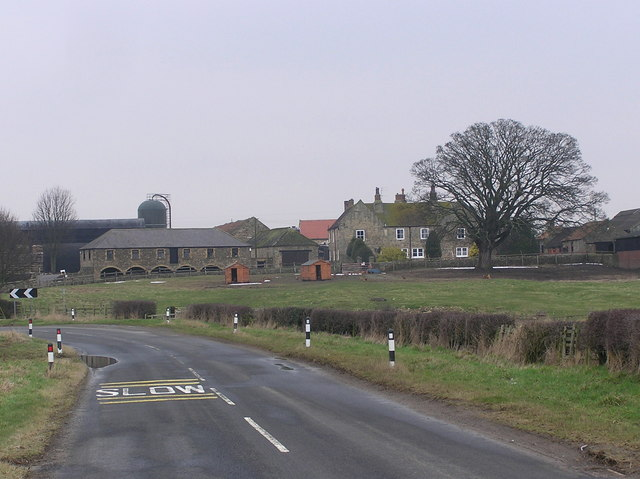
Ulnaby Hall farm

The village itself is believed to have been occupied from the late 13th to the 16th century; at first a few small tofts on the same hollow way which still leads east–west through the lost village. In the mid-12th century the land belonged to the Greystoke family, and by the late 13th century it was the property of William de Somerville, who exchanged it for Scottish land held by the Marmadukes. In 1320 a Marmaduke widow gave the land to Sir Thomas, Earl of Lancaster, and after Sir Thomas was executed in 1322 it reverted to the Neville family, at a time when the Carlbury and Ulnaby estates were jointly worth £20 per annum: quite profitable at that time. Before he died, it is thought possible that Lancaster redesigned the village around the green, and that he built the manor house in 1320 for a steward at the position now occupied by the southernmost farm buildings. The steward would have collected the peasants' dues for the absent landlord. Ulnaby and its associated manor belonged to the House of Neville from 1343 to 1573, and it is also possible that the original manor on the site, where Ulnaby Hall now stands, was built by Sir Ralph de Neville around 1354. Charles Neville forfeited it in 1571 for his part in the Rising of the North. Queen Elizabeth I granted it to the Tailboys family of Thornton Hall on 20 June 1573.

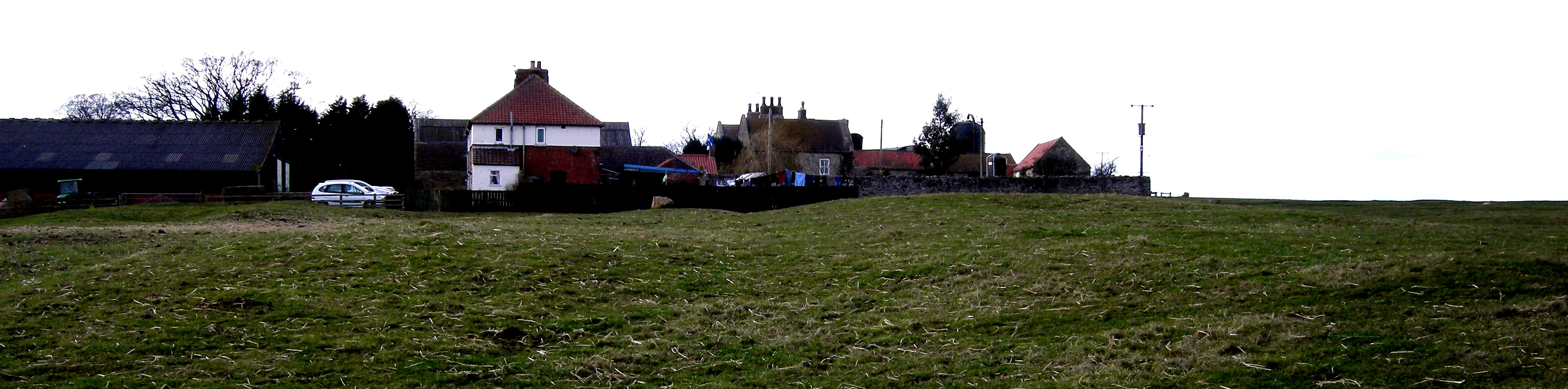
The last medieval building survived on this spot until the 19th century, used as barn

Documents of 1629 and 1654 indicate that the estate consisted of the manor, four tofts, three cottages, five barns, three gardens and orchards, a water cornmill and dovecote, with 100 acres (0.40 km^{2}) each of arable and meadow, 200 acres (0.81 km^{2}) of pasture and 5 acres (20,000 m^{2}) of woodland. It has been suggested that around 1573 the Tailboys family replaced the original manor with Ulnaby Hall and farm, possibly re-using material from the old manor house. The village dwindled in size until it became part of the farm; by 1629, three – not four – tofts remained, according to one source. Ulnaby Hall has been thought to date from 1609: this is possible as the earliest part of the hall dates from late 16th to early 17th century. Old maps show that Ulnaby village contained one last building of presumed medieval origin in 1855 beside the north-east corner of the present farm buildings, but that this was gone by 1896; it is said that it was used as a barn until the 1870s. Some farm cottages were then added, and these still exist. It is thought that the reduction in size of the village was in response to the success of the cloth industry, which encouraged change from labour-intensive arable land to pasture.

== Archaeological surveys and excavations ==
=== English Heritage and NDVA Group ===
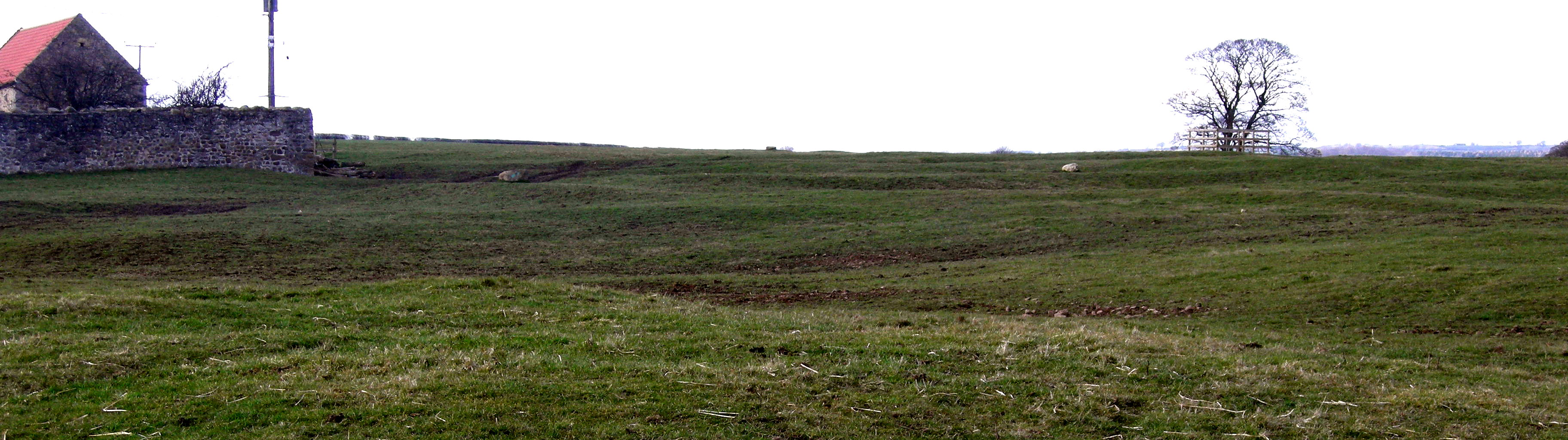
These earthworks were garths or toft enclosures

A non-intrusive earthwork survey was done by English Heritage's Archaeological Survey and Investigation team in 2007. This suggested that there had been a village there without a green, then a toft village consisting of two rows of small farmsteads around a green. After that, some tofts were added and some abandoned. Next to the village there was an enclosed area including a manor, fishpond, dovecote and orchard. At the same time as the English Heritage survey, the Northumberland and Durham Vernacular Architecture Group (NDVA Group) undertook a measured survey of Ulnaby Hall. They thought that a raised rectangular earthwork in the old village green could possibly have been the earliest evidence of village habitation, perhaps indicating an earlier manor or even a Roman building. They found possible lynchets on the north side of the old road as the hollow way enters the village from the east.

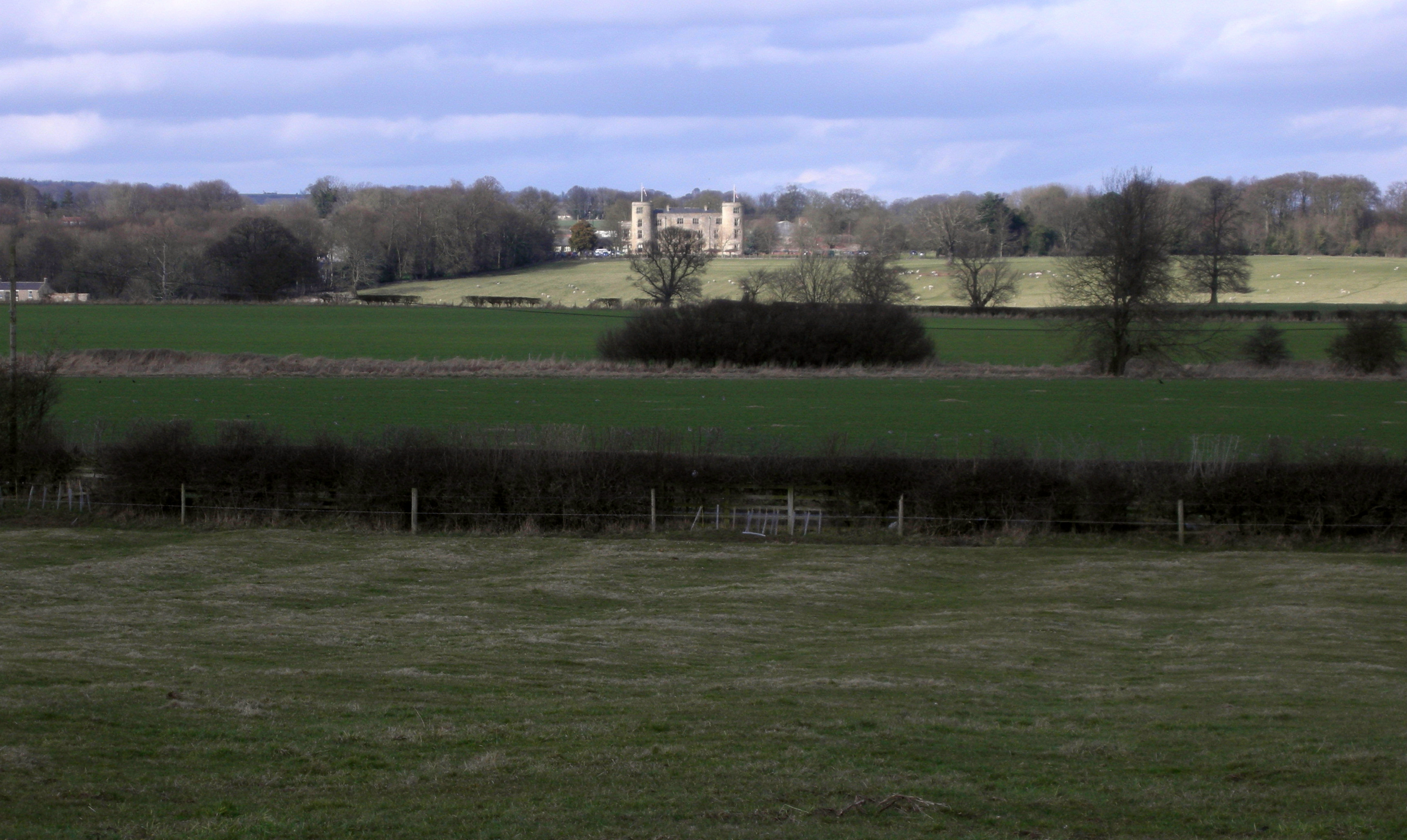
View north to Walworth Castle Hotel, showing Ulnaby's ridge and furrow fields in foreground

The manorial enclosure was at least 1.6 hectares, and is considered to have been fairly high status. It was bounded by a wall of dressed limestone blocks, and contained a fishpond and dovecote. The fishpond was cut into an old ridge and furrow field, and the residence itself is believed to be underneath the present Ulnaby Hall. There is evidence of a succession of buildings on the site, terminating in the 19th century, but the village had shrunk by the 17th century, indicating the effect of the change from labour-intensive arable land to pasture. A survey of Ulnaby Hall shows a single-phase build in the late 16th century of a south-facing building of one large room over another and two wings at the back, with service rooms to the west. Two of the original gardens, to the south and east of the hall, still exist, and the third was probably the garth field or paddock to the south of the farm track. There was a smithy, five barns and orchards. One of the peasant houses was quite large, having three rooms. It is thought that the southern end of the site, around the water channel, was a marshy area that provided the village with various resources, and that it was drained in the 18th century.

=== Time Team and Wessex Archaeology ===
In April 2008, archaeological television programme Time Team excavated the site. A total of eight trenches were dug, and the report was written by Wessex Archaeology. Evidence was found of occupation from the late 13th or early 14th centuries until some time in the 15th century, when activity appears to have centred on the western tofts of the north row, and one or two tofts in the south row, until the 16th century. The double row of tofts with village green appeared to be the original pattern, and there was no evidence of pre-medieval occupation. The hollow way was cobbled and continued in regular use until the 19th century. Earlier buildings were found to be cruck-built with stone bases to the walls, and later ones probably stone-built. The manorial enclosure, early earthwork on the village green and the hollow way were not excavated.

== Preservation ==
The site is now listed as scheduled ancient monument, English Heritage Archive number 20961. Ulnaby Hall survives as a Grade II listed building with its farm. Some of its blocked-up windows are said to date back to the 16th or 17th century. An ancient sycamore tree and terrace in a field in front of the hall are survivors from one of the original gardens. Ulnaby Hall is surrounded by fields of earthworks under pasture, showing banks, ditches, walls and hollow ways. Possibly one of the fishponds was at the south end of the site, fed by the water channel. It is thought that it is the use of land as pasture which has preserved the site unchanged since the village was deserted. Around 2008, Ulnaby Hall Farm opened the site and farm as a visitor attraction. A reconstruction painting of the medieval village has been produced for visitors, along with a self-guided walk leaflet. Stiles, gates and bridges have been constructed for the use of visitors and to protect the earthworks, and guided walks were offered to local people by English Heritage. Wildlife at the site includes hares and owls.

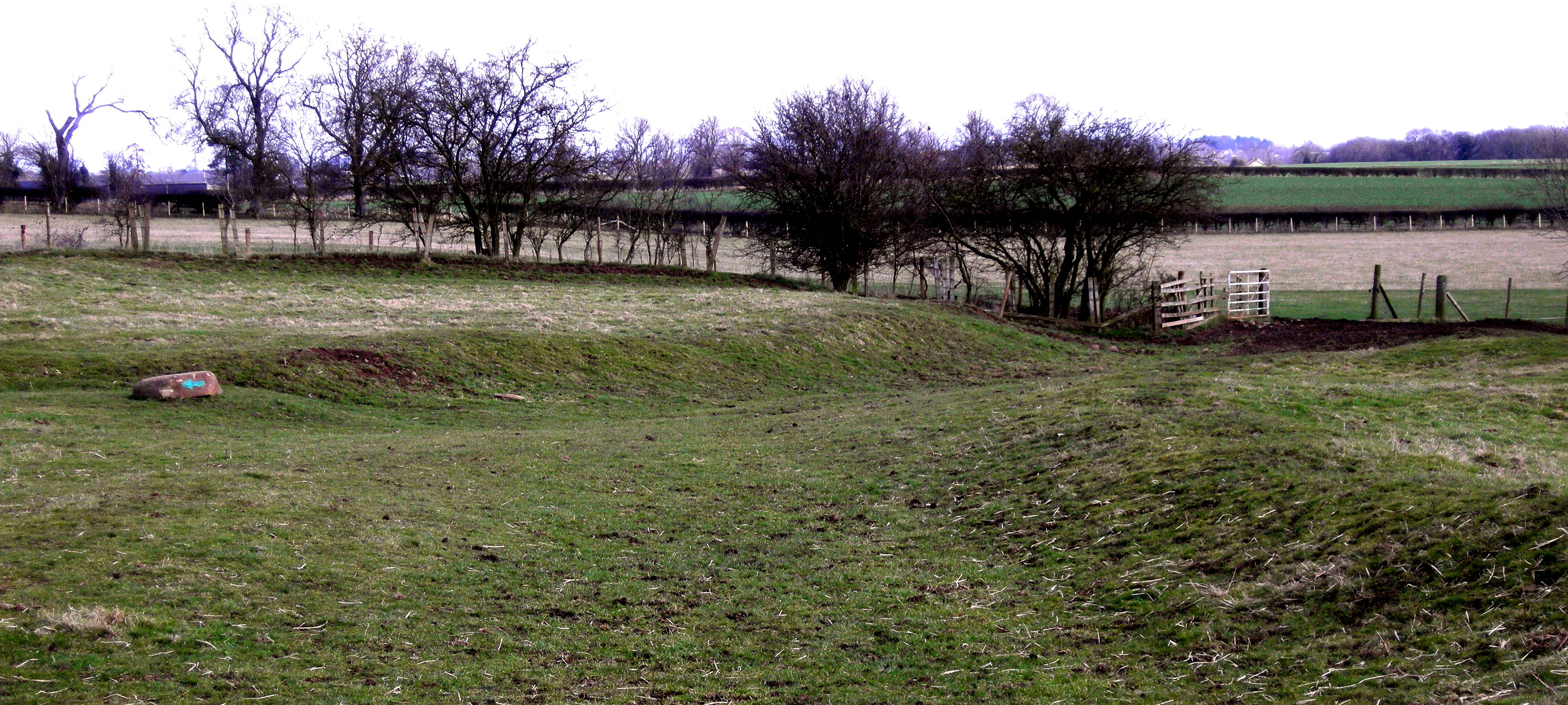
Ulnaby site looking east: hollow way once led from Ulnaby to Thornton Hall

== See also ==
- Deserted medieval village
- List of lost settlements in the United Kingdom
