= High Coniscliffe =

Village in County Durham, England

Coordinates: 54.53684°N 1.64777°W

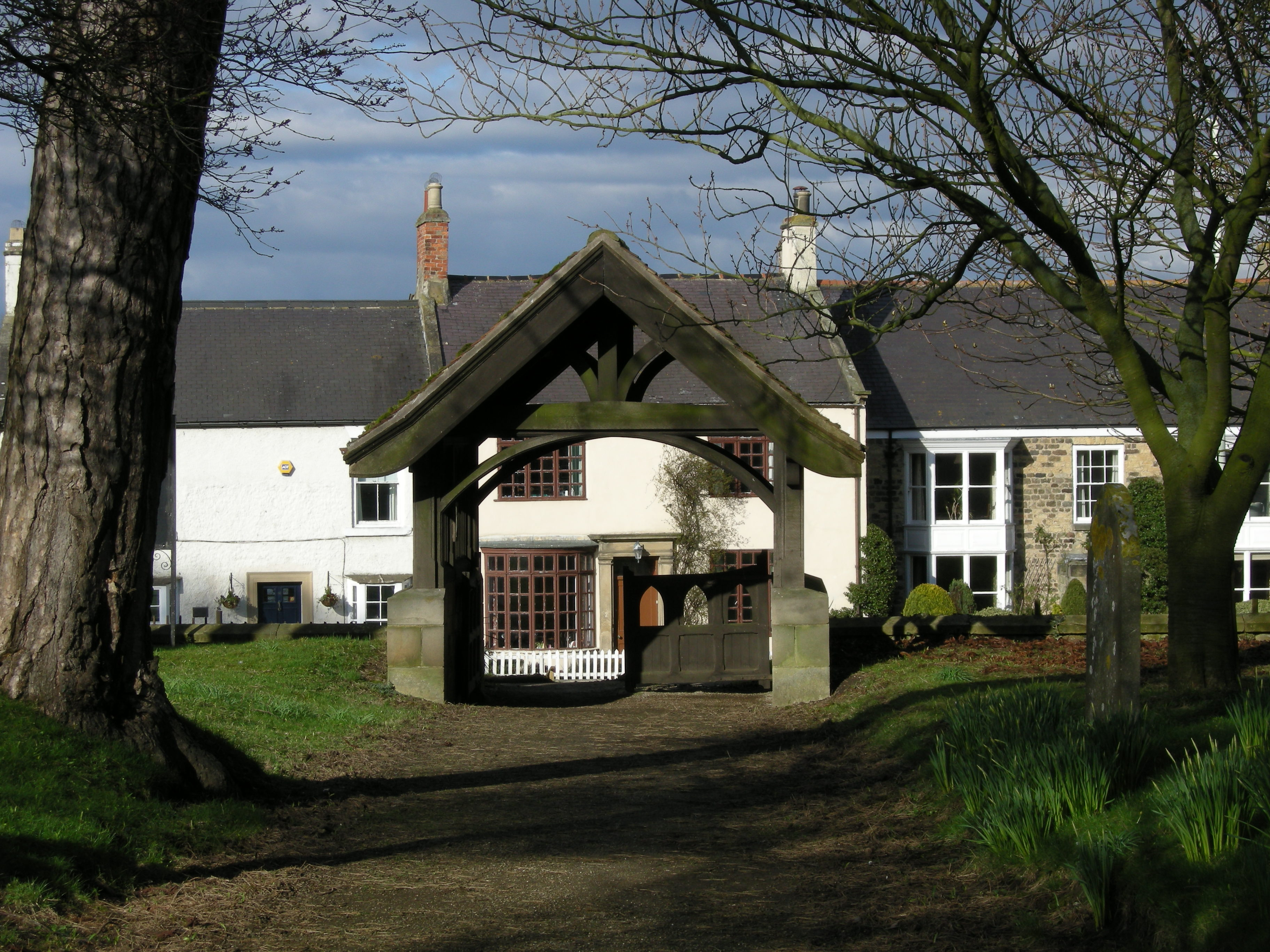
- Lychgate, High Coniscliffe

- Location within County Durham
- Population: 242 (2011)
- OS grid reference: NZ226152
- Unitary authority: Darlington
- Ceremonial county: County Durham
- Region: North East
- Country: England
- Sovereign state: United Kingdom
- Post town: DARLINGTON
- Postcode district: DL2
- Dialling code: 01325
- Police: Durham
- Fire: County Durham and Darlington
- Ambulance: North East
- UK Parliament: Darlington

High Coniscliffe is a parish and village in the borough of Darlington and ceremonial county of County Durham, England. The parish includes Carlbury and Low Coniscliffe. It is part of Heighington and Coniscliffe ward, and is situated approximately 4 miles (6.4 km) west of Darlington. At the 2011 Census the population of this civil parish was 242.

It is now a linear village, with most houses along the north side of the A67, but is also a doubly nucleated village as it has a village green and church on the south side of the road, and a history of a community focus at the T-junction of Ulnaby Lane and the A67, where the Methodist church and post office once were, and where a public house remains. It has always been a small village, but its history goes back to Anglo-Saxon times, and the earliest part of St Oswald's church is Norman. The Duke of Wellington pub is notable for having had a portrait of Napoleon, Wellington's defeated enemy, on its sign from 1975 to 1988.

== Geographical and political ==
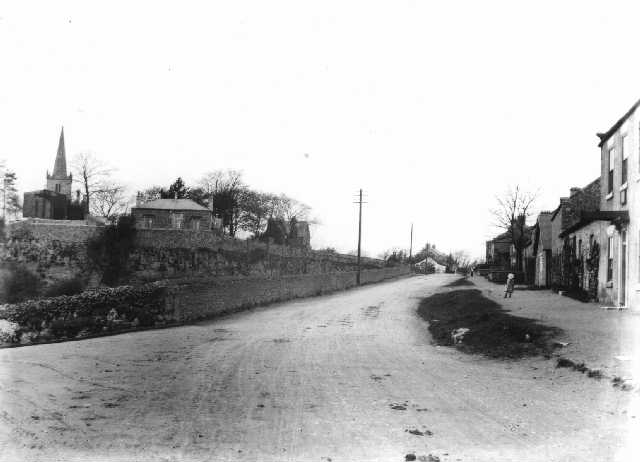
The Green, 1876–1900

High Coniscliffe covers 3,008 acres (12.17 km^{2}) and is located between Coniscliffe Moor to the north with its ridge and furrow meadow, and the River Tees to the south. It has a village green on the south side of the A67, but most of the village is along the north side of the road which is called The Green at that point. St Edwin's church is on the south side of the road, backing on to a small cliff and the River Tees, and facing the green and the road. The cliff itself is walled, towered and crenellated in places, and in the mid−19th century the village was surrounded by quarries. Another focus of the village is the T-junction where Ulnaby Lane meets the A67, and where the A67 is closest to the river. The Teesdale Way follows the north bank of the river at the south of the village. The name, Coniscliffe, means king's cliff, first recorded in 1040 as Cingcesclife, from the Old English cyning and clif together with the Old Norse konungr. It is on a ridge or cliff of limestone, and closer to the river at the west end than the east end of the village, due to the river bend. The village is in Heighington and Coniscliffe ward under Darlington Borough Council, and Gerald Lee and Eric Roberts are the Conservative councillors for the ward. Wildlife found in the area includes the barn owl, garden warbler, and tawny owl; a rookery is also located nearby.

== History ==
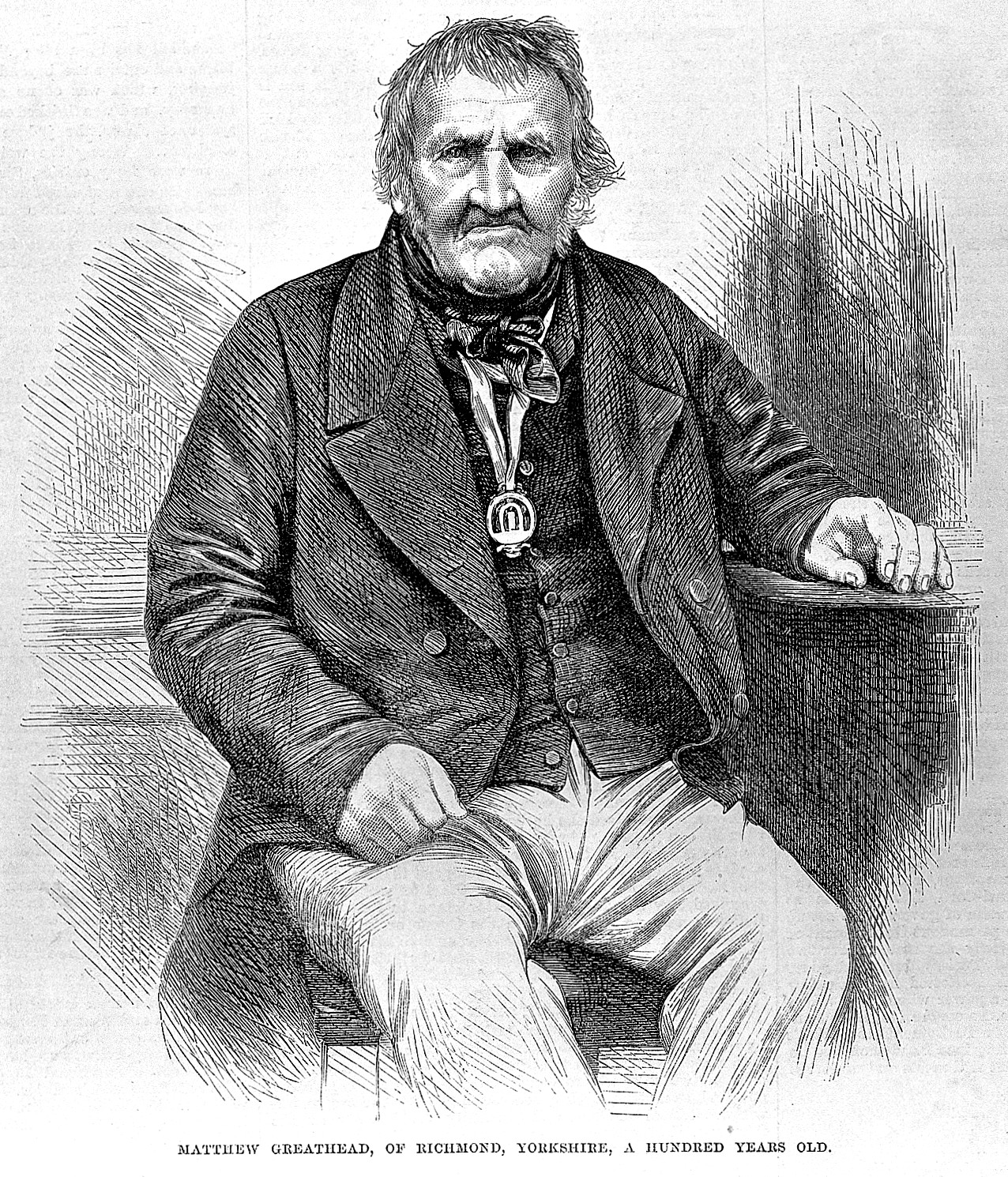
Matthew Greathead

The parish once belonged to the wapentake of Sadberge, which was part of Northumberland until 1189. Æthelwald Moll of Northumbria, who may have previously murdered Oswulf of Northumbria for the succession, killed Oswin, a Bernician nobleman here in 761. In the year 778 AD a high sheriff called Elduf was killed here. Later there was a coup in which Æthelred I of Northumbria, Moll's son, was ousted by Ælfwald I of Northumbria, and several royal nobles were killed in this same village. Richard Thirkeld, a Catholic missionary priest from the village, was executed at York on 29 May 1583 for high treason due to his Catholicism. On 4 March 1590 another local Catholic priest, Christopher Bayles, was similarly executed.

In 1734 the churchwardens of the village were given a house and 6 acres (0.024 km^{2}) by Robert Bowes of Thornton Hall. The rent from the house was donated to the poor at Christmas and midsummer. A venerable native of the village was carpenter Matthew Greathead (23 April 1770−31 December 1871), who became the oldest living Freemason of his time. His lodge commemorated him with a column at the gate of St Mary's church, Richmond.

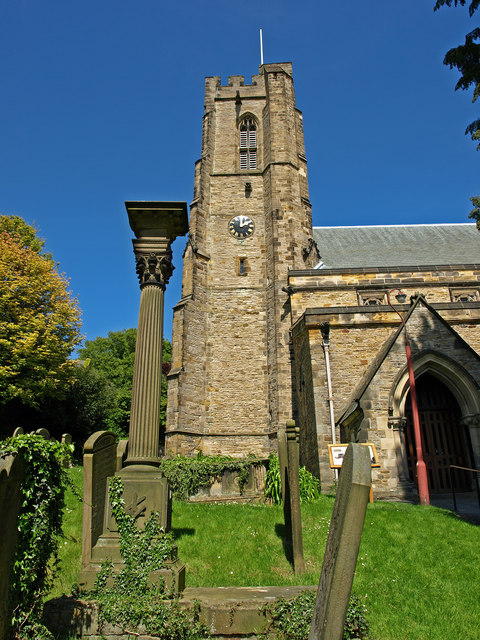
M. Greathead's memorial, St Mary's

Edward Liddell, who later became chief constable of Newark, was born in the parish in 1826. The population has always been low: in 1801 220; in 1811 234; in 1821 245; in 1831 234; in 1841 244; in 1851 248; in 1861 234; in 1871 318; in 1881 355; in 1891 349. In 1893 the village was worth £4,259. From 1590 to 1836 the village had sufficient population to support at least two or three marriages per year. A school was built here in 1830, and that building is now the church hall. The national school, which may have used the same building but no longer exists, was founded in 1848 for 87 pupils. There is a local legend set at the time when the national school was being built. A native man called Dickenson returned to his village on 28 June 1848 to attempt a cure for paralysis. He asked to be buried up to his neck in the riverbank for four hours, and after much pain his health was improved.

== Archaeological finds ==
Smotherlaw barrow at Carlbury is in the parish of High Coniscliffe. A small, copper, Bronze Age tool was found in the village in 1991. Roman pottery, thought to be related to Piercebridge Roman Fort, has been found scattered on fields, possibly as fertiliser from a Roman midden. There is a carving in St Edwin's church of two winged figures on either side of a calf or ram; this is thought to be an Anglo-Saxon re-carving of a Roman dedication stone.

== Significant buildings ==
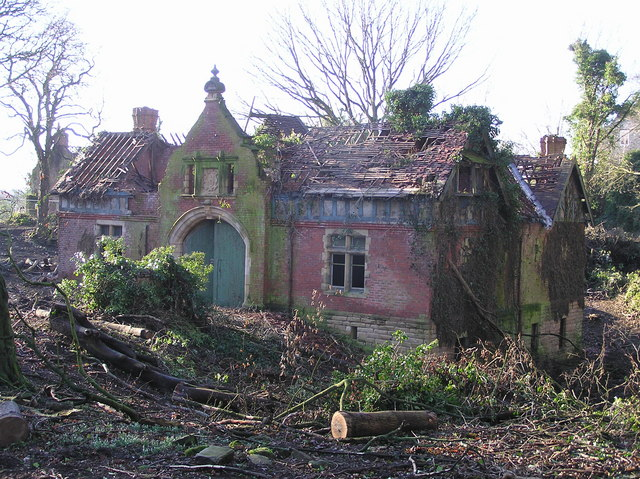
Ruined house at Ulnaby Lane junction, now replaced by Lawson's Court

Old Hall Farm incorporates a farmhouse, at 23 The Green, whose north-west wing could be a 13th-century bastle house, built as sanctuary during raids from Scotland. Most of the building dates from the 17th century. Mill house is considered old but has been restored with a heron weather vane. The Spotted Dog pub is named after a foxhound called Blue Cap which won a race at Newmarket for a wager with a stake of 500 guineas in 1792. The village's Methodist chapel was built in 1827 where Ulnaby Lane meets the A67, and demolished in the 1940s. There is an old dovecote in the village. The Duke of Wellington pub had a picture of Napoleon on its sign from 1975 to 1988. The pub's car park is the site of the old post office which doubled as the hackney carriage station, and where an Elizabethan stone sundial was found in the garden. It was near the old golf club and opposite the Methodist chapel at the southern end of Ulnaby Lane. A recent development of twelve houses called Lawson's Court was built in the village in 2009. following the closure of Lawson's Garage.The Duke of Wellington closed in 2010 to become a domestic home with 2 new Houses built in the car-park.

=== St Edwin's church, vicarage and hall ===
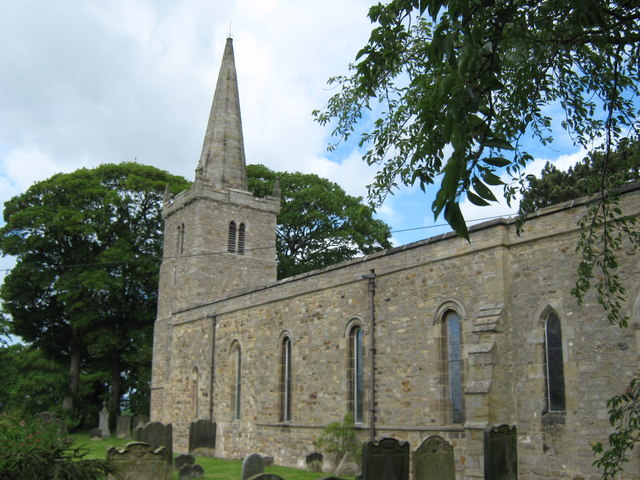
St Edwin's church

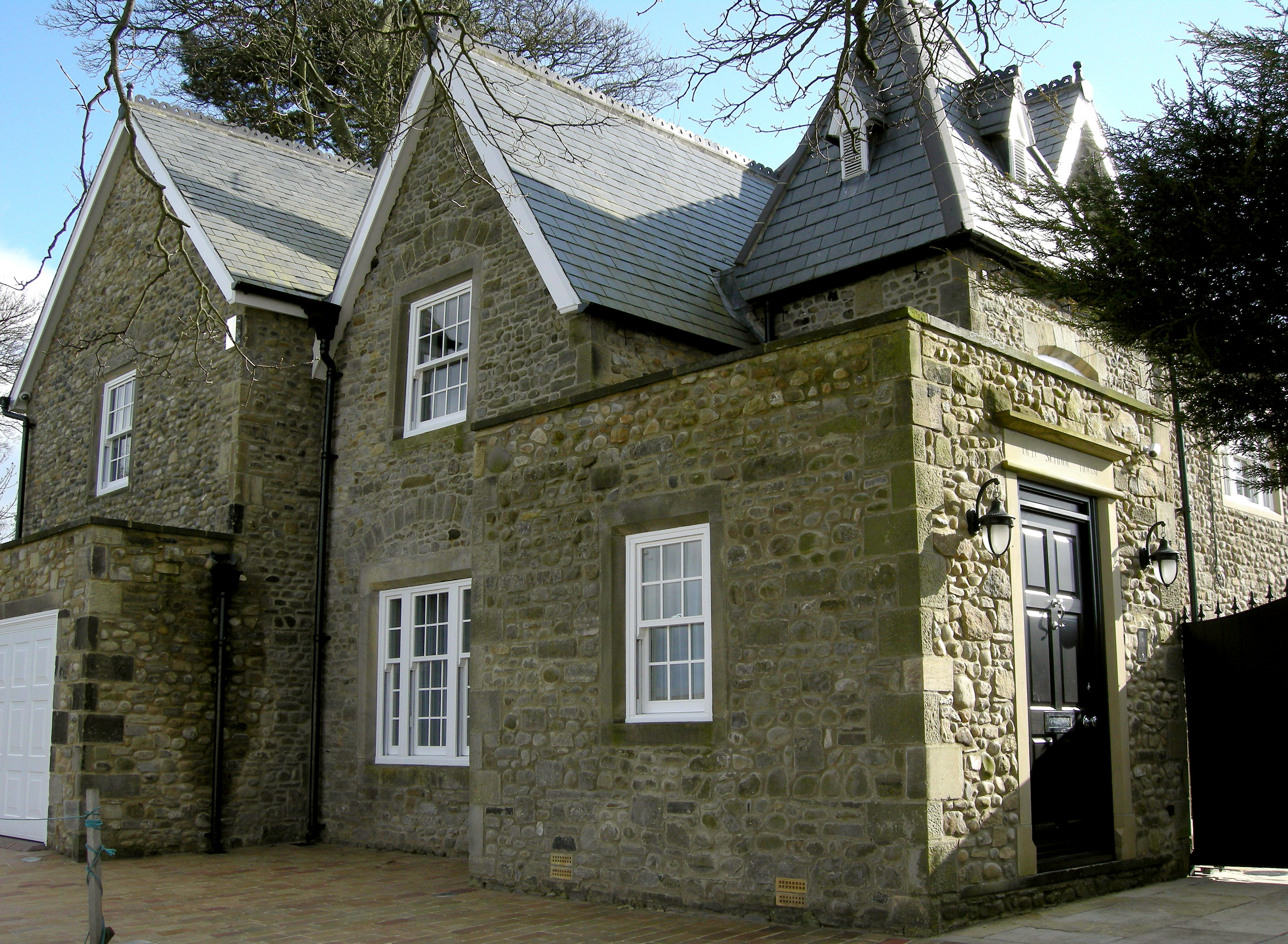
Church hall (old school house)

The church is dedicated to Edwin of Northumbria, who declared himself overking of all England and converted to Christianity on 11 April 627 AD. It is thought that there could have been an earlier church on the site; the present St Edwin's church dates from 1170. It is built of limestone, it is dedicated to Edwin of Northumbria and has a Norman carved and arched doorway under the north porch. It has a nave, chancel, north aisle, square tower and octagonal spire. The embattled tower was built between the Norman and medieval eras. The chancel arch is Gothic, and supported on corbels with carved capitals; the south corbel appears to be Norman. The east window has rich stained glass. The building was upgraded in the 13th century when the spire was added, and it was restored in 1892. In that year it was reseated, the floor relaid, and a new screen, altar and tower clock added; all at a cost of £600. Another source gives the restoration date as 1844. As of 2009 it has a stainless steel roof.

The vicarage, next to the church and on the edge of the limestone ridge, was remodelled around 1850 and is said to contain secret passages. It has a well in the garden and a coat of arms on the exterior wall on the west side of the building. In 1848 the vicar had the benefit of the vicarage, a glebe of 60 acres (0.24 km^{2}) and local tithes to the value of £7 18s 1½d. The glebe may be associated with the ridge and furrow field to the north of the village. The church hall was built of stone and slate in 1830 as a school, and it has a later, flat-roofed extension. It was the village school until the early 1960s, then was renovated in 2000 with a grant of £57,000 from Cleartop, a waste management company. Low Coniscliffe and Merrybent share the hall with High Coniscliffe.

== High Coniscliffe Primary School ==
High Coniscliffe CE Primary School is the only school in the village. It opened in 1963 with 40 children, and now has about 100. It has achieved the sustainable level of the national School Travel plan accreditation scheme, which attempts to make it easier and safer for children to reach school without wasting resources. It achieved an Ofsted outstanding rating, the top of its four-point scale, in 2007–2008.

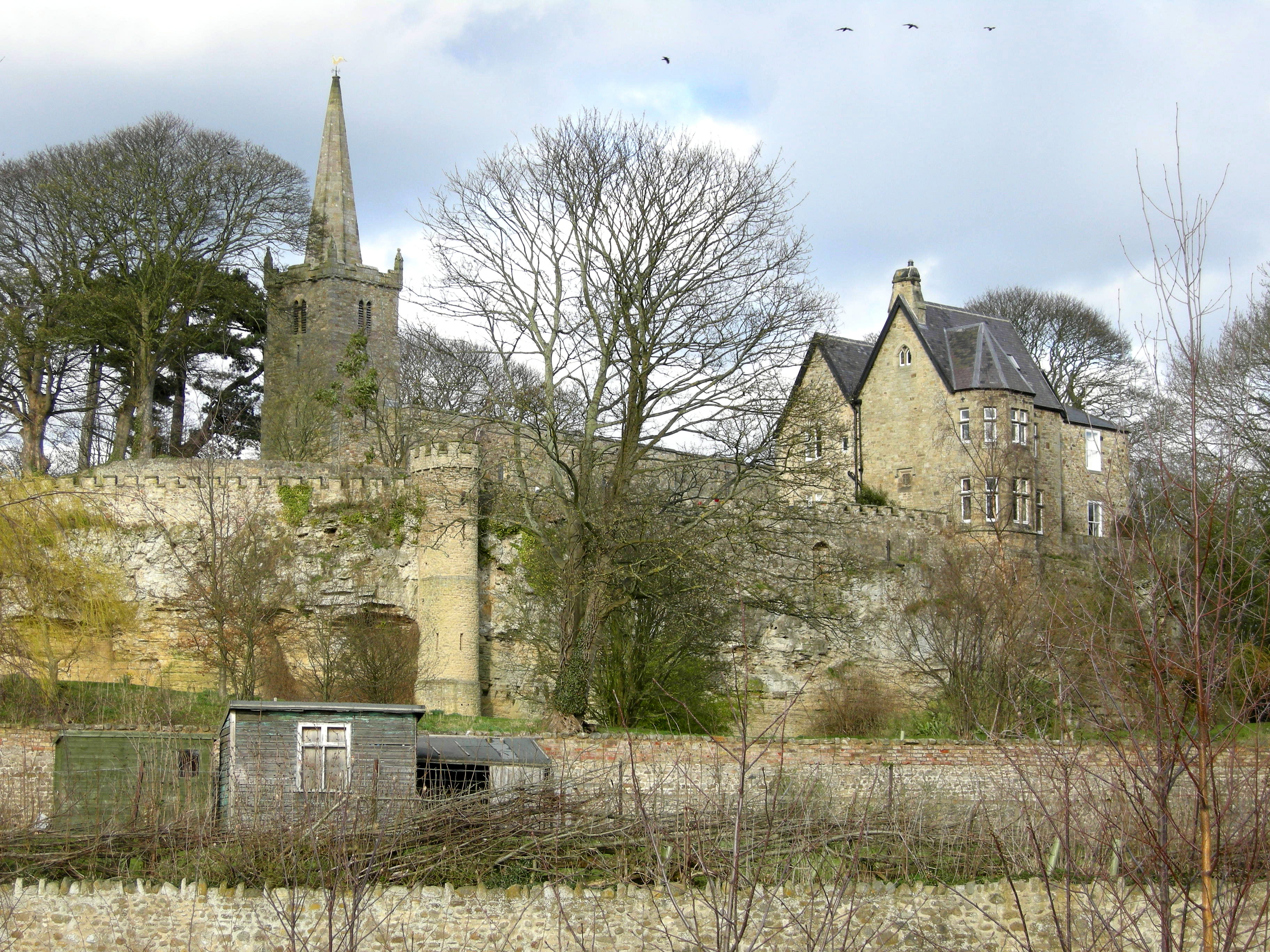
St Edwin's Church and vicarage on cliff
