= Yarm Bridge =

Listed building in North Yorkshire, England

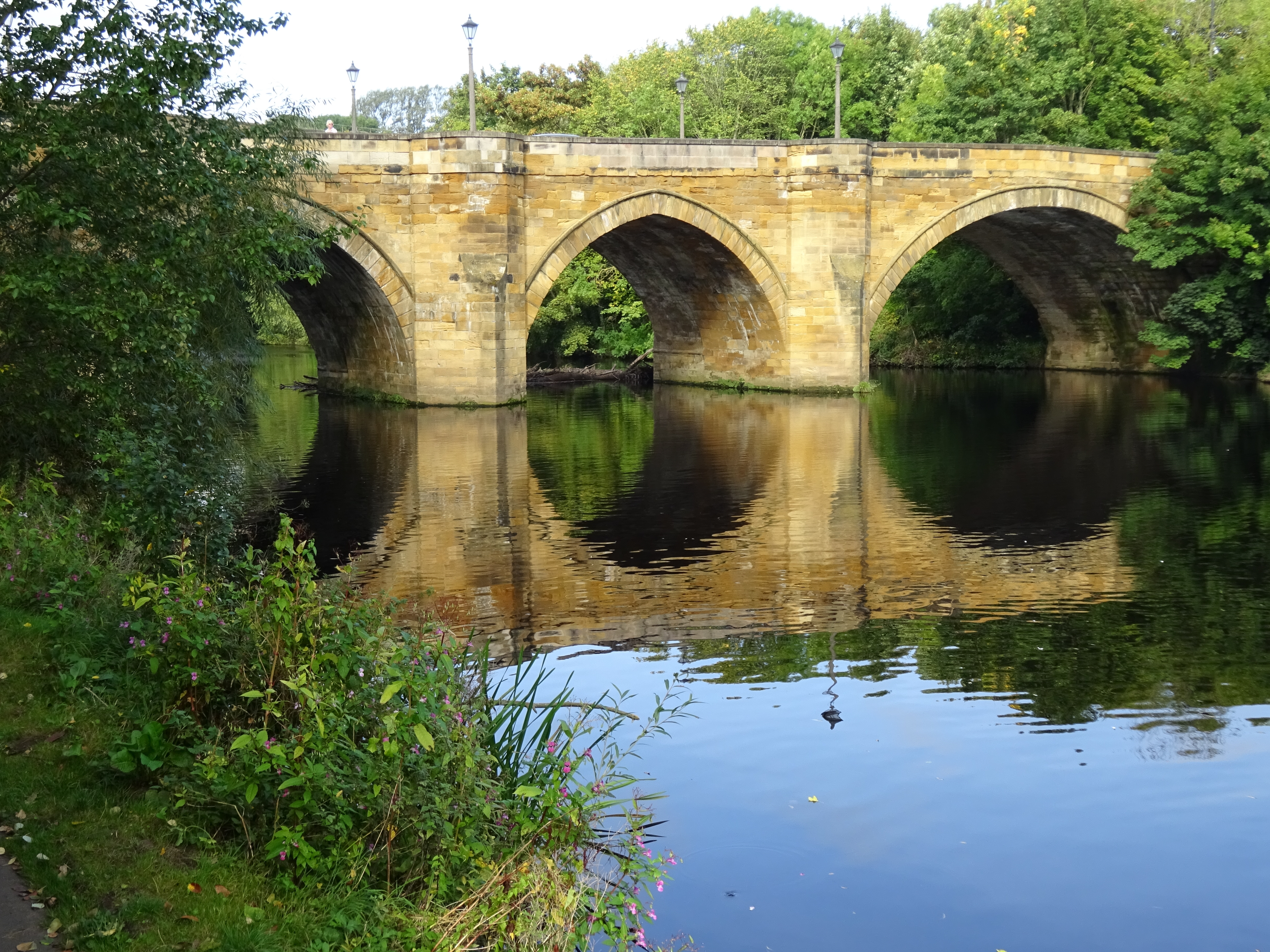
- Coordinates: 54.511975°N 1.355803°W
- OS grid reference: NZ418131
- Carries: A67 road
- Crosses: River Tees
- Locale: Yarm
- Preceded by: Yarm Viaduct
- Followed by: Preston Pipe Bridge

Characteristics
- Total length: 330 feet (100 m)

History
- Built: 1400
- Rebuilt: 1810

Listed Building – Grade II*
- Official name: YARM BRIDGE OVER RIVER TEES
- Designated: 16 November 1997
- Reference no.: 1105658; 1006763

Location
- Interactive map of Yarm Bridge

Yarm Bridge is a Grade II* listed masonry road bridge over the River Tees, connecting the towns of Yarm and Egglescliffe.

== History ==
The main thoroughfare through the town of Yarm was historically West Street, which at the River Tees led to a ford. A "bridge of Yarum" is mentioned in 1228, with a bridge at the location seemingly in a bad condition, in 1305 when Edward I granted a 5 year toll to repair it. In 1400, Walter Skirlaw, Bishop of Durham, ordered a replacement road bridge in stone. It originally consisted of 5 pointed arches, however in the modern day, only the three central arches remain.

During the English Civil War the northmost arch of the bridge was destroyed and was replaced by a draw bridge, to prevent parliamentary forces from attacking the controlling royalists. This span was not replaced until 1785.

In 1771 a major flood on the Tees, along with others in the North-East, caused major damage to many of the river's bridges. Despite escaping the flood without damage, the small size of bridges span meant that the flow was unable to pass beneath and instead serious damage was caused to the town, with every house being underwater. Partly as a result of a desire to avoid this problem in future and a need to increase the bridge's capacity for traffic, it was decided, in 1803, to replace the bridge with an iron bridge. This bridge was built under the direction of Thomas Wilson. By 1805 the arches where erected. Unfortunately, at the beginning of the next year, the completed but unopened structure collapsed, and the stone bridge was instead doubled in width.

Today it carries the A67 road.
