= Merrybent =

Coordinates: 54.52521°N 1.62607°W

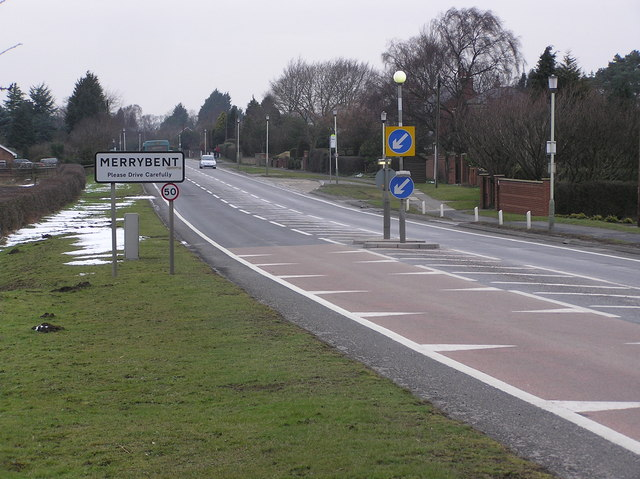
- Merrybent on the A67 road

- Location within County Durham
- OS grid reference: NZ240140
- Unitary authority: Darlington
- Ceremonial county: County Durham
- Region: North East
- Country: England
- Sovereign state: United Kingdom
- Post town: DARLINGTON
- Postcode district: DL2
- Dialling code: 01325
- Police: Durham
- Fire: County Durham and Darlington
- Ambulance: North East
- UK Parliament: Darlington

Merrybent is a linear village in the civil parish of Low Coniscliffe and Merrybent in County Durham, in England. It is situated on the A67 road to the west of Darlington, a short distance to the north of the River Tees and the Teesdale Way. At the beginning of the 20th century there were hardly any buildings here, and its main feature at that time was Merrybent Nurseries with its many glasshouses. The nursery was cut through by the A1 road in the 1960s; at this point it runs on the trackbed of the old Merrybent railway. The village is now a settlement of modern housing.

== Geography ==
This is a linear village arranged in a north-west to south-east alignment on the A67 road where it crosses the Motorway A1, 1 mile (1.6 km) west of the edge of Darlington. Although the A1 is part of the landscape, there is no access to it from the A67. The underlying geology is glacial clay with areas of gravel, sand, peat and alluvium, and outcrops of dolomite and carboniferous limestone. Gravel extraction south of the village in the fields bordering the river Tees occurred in the early 20th century. This has left regular shaped treeless field boundaries and a stepped relief pattern.

== History ==
=== Road and rail ===
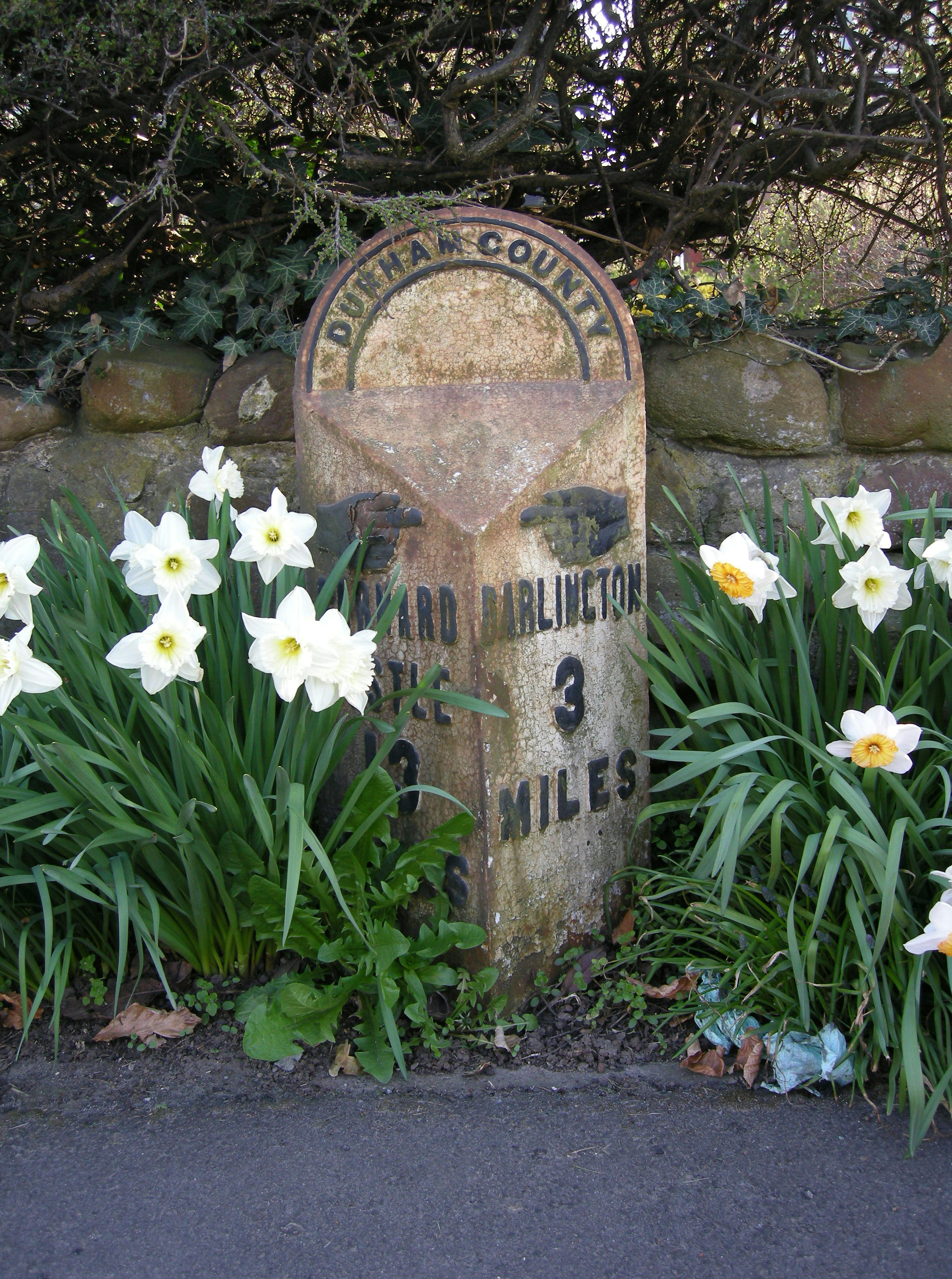
Merrybent milepost

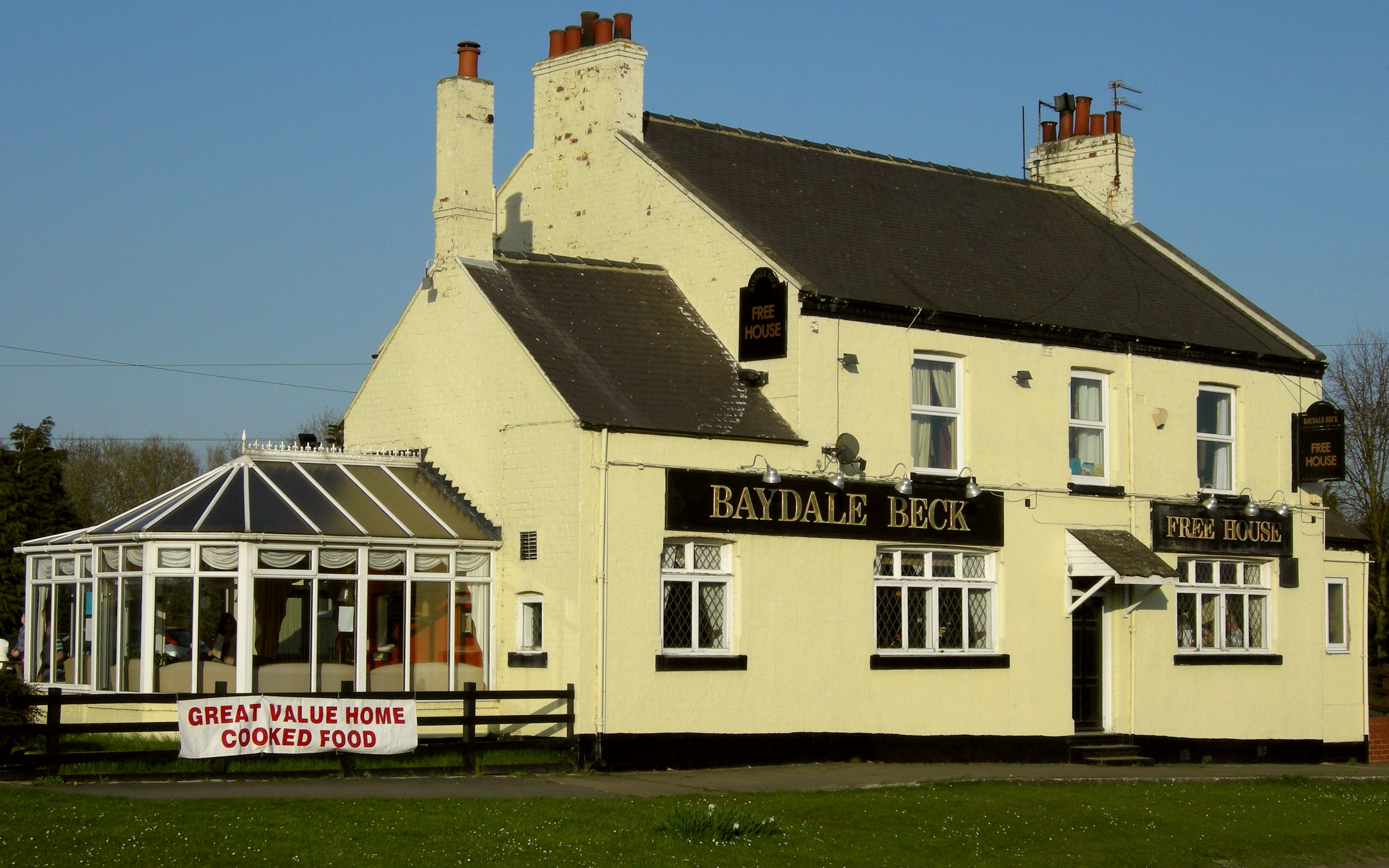
Baydale Beck pub

The late 19th century milepost is listed. It is on the south side of the road in front of number 12, near the east end of the village, and was possibly associated with a previous turnpike road. It is triangular in plan, of cast iron with raised black-painted letters on a white-painted background. It says Durham County on the back, Barnard Castle 13 miles with hand pointing west, and Darlington 3 miles with hand pointing east.

Merrybent and Darlington Railway Act 1866
- Act of Parliament
- Parliament of the United Kingdom
- Long title: An Act to incorporate a Company for making a Railway to he called "the Merrybent and Darlington Railway," and a Branch therefrom; to authorize Working and Traffic Arrangements with the Northeastern Railway Company; and for other Purposes.
- Citation: 29 & 30 Vict. c. lxxv

Dates
- Royal assent: 11 June 1866

Merrybent and Darlington Railway Company (Winding Up) Act 1878
- Act of Parliament
- Parliament of the United Kingdom
- Long title: An Act to provide for the winding up of the Merrybent and Darlington Railway.
- Citation: 41 & 42 Vict. c. xciii

Dates
- Royal assent: 17 June 1878

Text of statute as originally enacted

The Merrybent and Darlington Railway was authorised by the Merrybent and Darlington Railway Act 1866 (29 & 30 Vict. c. lxxv). It was built in 1870 as a branch line which left the Darlington and Barnard Castle Railway near Newton Lane (Branksome) Darlington to carry limestone from Barton Quarry within the Low Merrybent estate near Scotch Corner North Yorkshire. It was closed by the Merrybent and Darlington Railway Company (Winding Up) Act 1878 (41 & 42 Vict. c. xciii) when the company went bankrupt, but the line and quarries were re-opened by North Eastern Railway (NER) in 1890, and became part of the NER under the North Eastern Railway Act 1900 (63 & 64 Vict. c. clxiii). A coal depot was opened where the railway (now named The Merrybent Branch) passed under the A67 road on the outskirts of Darlington and this became Merrybent Depot. A market garden grew up alongside this, known as Merrybent Nursery. In the 20th century, houses began to grow around these facilities which gradually extended west. The village is hence named after the original terminus of the railway line some six miles south of its actual location. The railway was abandoned in 1938, and later dismantled.

The A1, built 1963–1965, now follows the old rail trackbed as far as Barton quarries. The A1 was first proposed in 1929 but postponed due to the 1930s recession and World War II. After the Merrybent railway was abandoned, the road plan was associated with the Darlington bypass as a motorway in 1949, and was moved eastwards onto the old trackway in 1950. After various planning adjustments, construction of this stretch of the A1 started officially by Dowsett Engineering Ltd. of Gateshead on 6 May 1963. Peak production occurred in 1964, involving up to 800 men, and the road was opened on 14 May 1965 at a final cost of £6.5 million. Because the road followed the rail trackway, the only property affected on this part of the A1, apart from the station house at Barton, was the glasshouses at Merrybent Nurseries.

=== Settlement ===
The Ordnance Survey map of 1912–1913 shows the area almost without buildings. During World War II there were landgirls from the Women's Land Army working at Merrybent Nurseries. There were 56 glasshouses owned by the Co-operative Society; the girls grew tomatoes, controlled the rats, and were billeted in Darlington.

== Merrybent today ==
The present village was built mostly in the 20th century, and in 2008–2009 new houses cost £95−320k. A strategic greenfield building site was identified on fields at the south-east of Merrybent by Darlington Borough Council in 2009. There is no school here, but the village is on the Barnard Castle School bus route. The Teesdale Way passes along the north bank of the meandering River Tees to the south of the village.

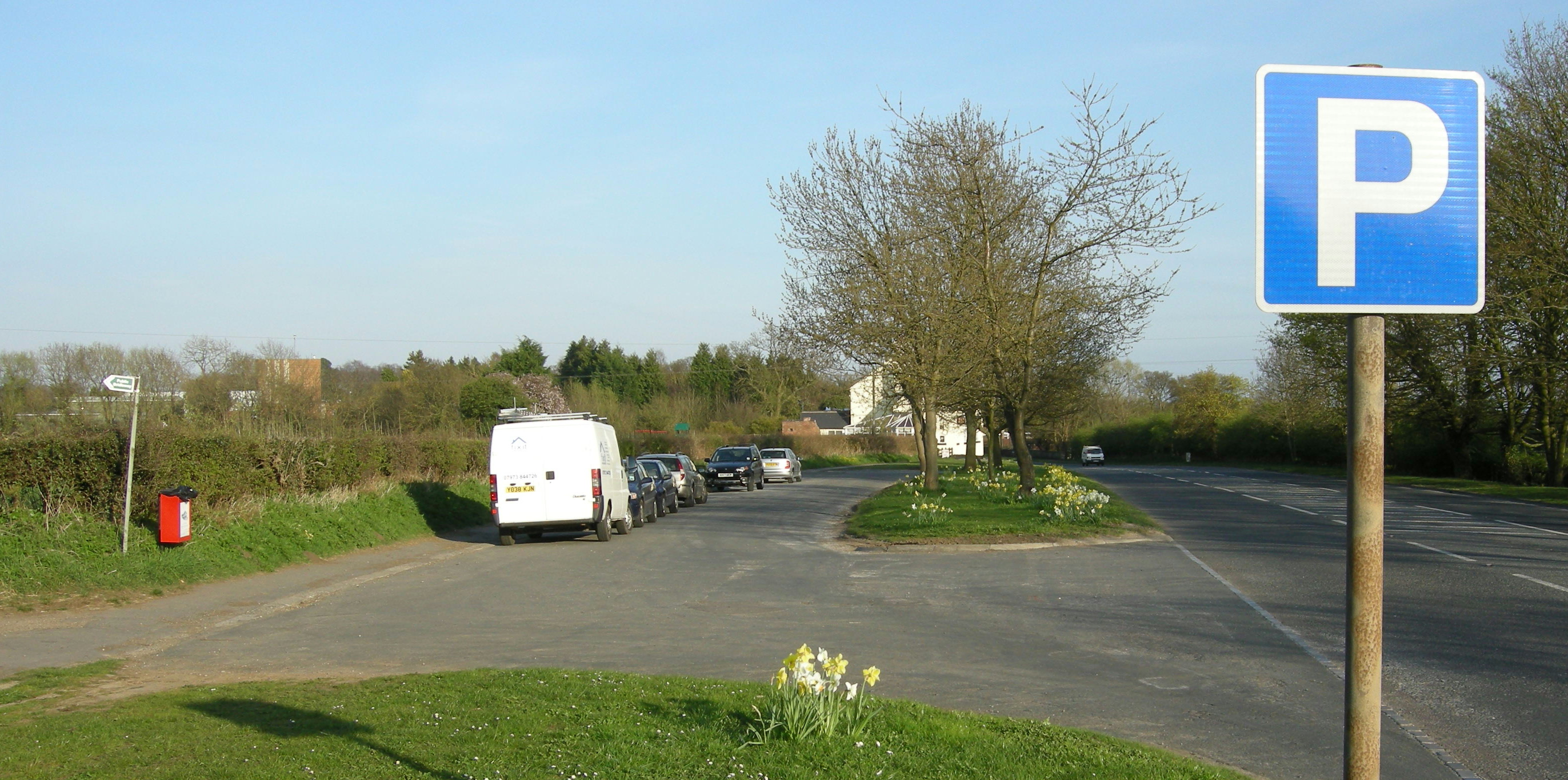
Merrybent layby on the A67, east of the street settlement. Baydale Beck pub is in the background.

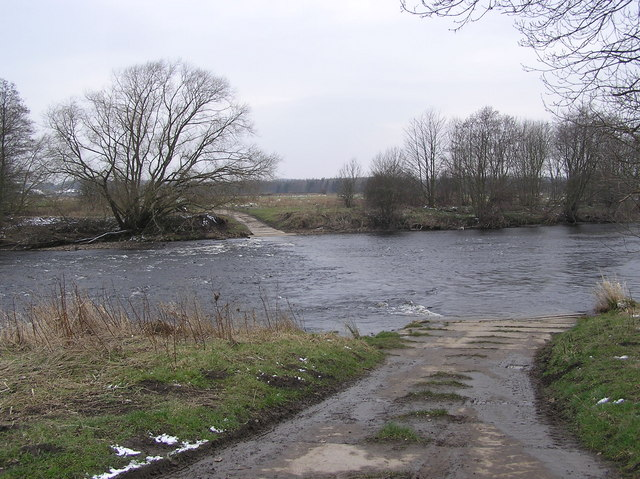
Ford across Tees. Photo taken from Teesdale Way, south of Merrybent

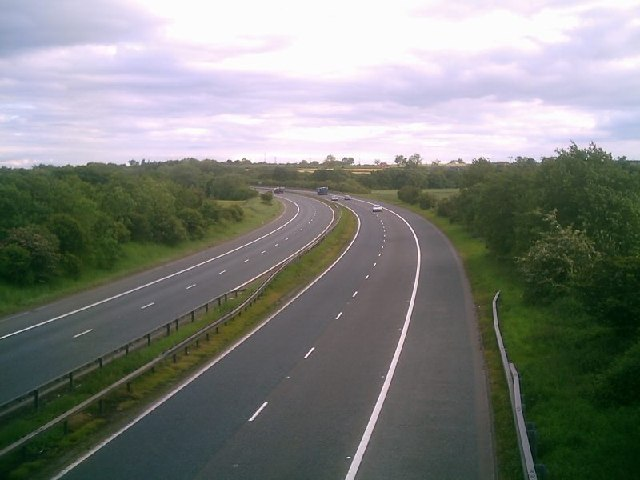
The A1 at Merrybent, viewed from A67 road bridge
