= Thornton Hall, High Coniscliffe =

16th century manor house near Darlington, England

Coordinates: 54.5476°N 1.6333°W

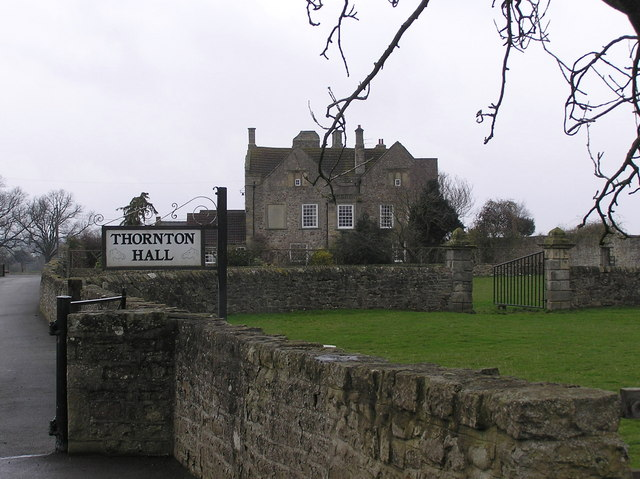
Thornton Hall, photograph by Hugh Mortimer

Thornton Hall is a privately owned 16th century manor house (now a farmhouse) at High Coniscliffe, near Darlington, County Durham. It is a Grade I listed building.

The house was built in about 1550 for Ralph Talbois. The gabled central block of two storeys plus attics was originally flanked by gabled crosswings. The right wing remains. The left wing has been removed. A two-storey entrance porch offcentre carries an embattled parapet.

The last of the Talbois died in 1606. By about 1630 the manor had passed to Henry Bowes, Sheriff of Newcastle. The rear range was added in about 1630 by Sir Francis Bowes who was High Sheriff of Northumberland in 1664 and who was attainted for his part in the English Civil War and was obliged to compound for the return of his forfeited estate. Elizabeth Bowes heiress to the property married Rev Robert Croft who was the owner in 1834.

The present owners Mr and Mrs Manners of Manners Farms Ltd have restored the two acre medieval garden which has been opened to the public.
