= A67 road =

Road in England

Coordinates: 54.52982°N 1.64006°W

A67

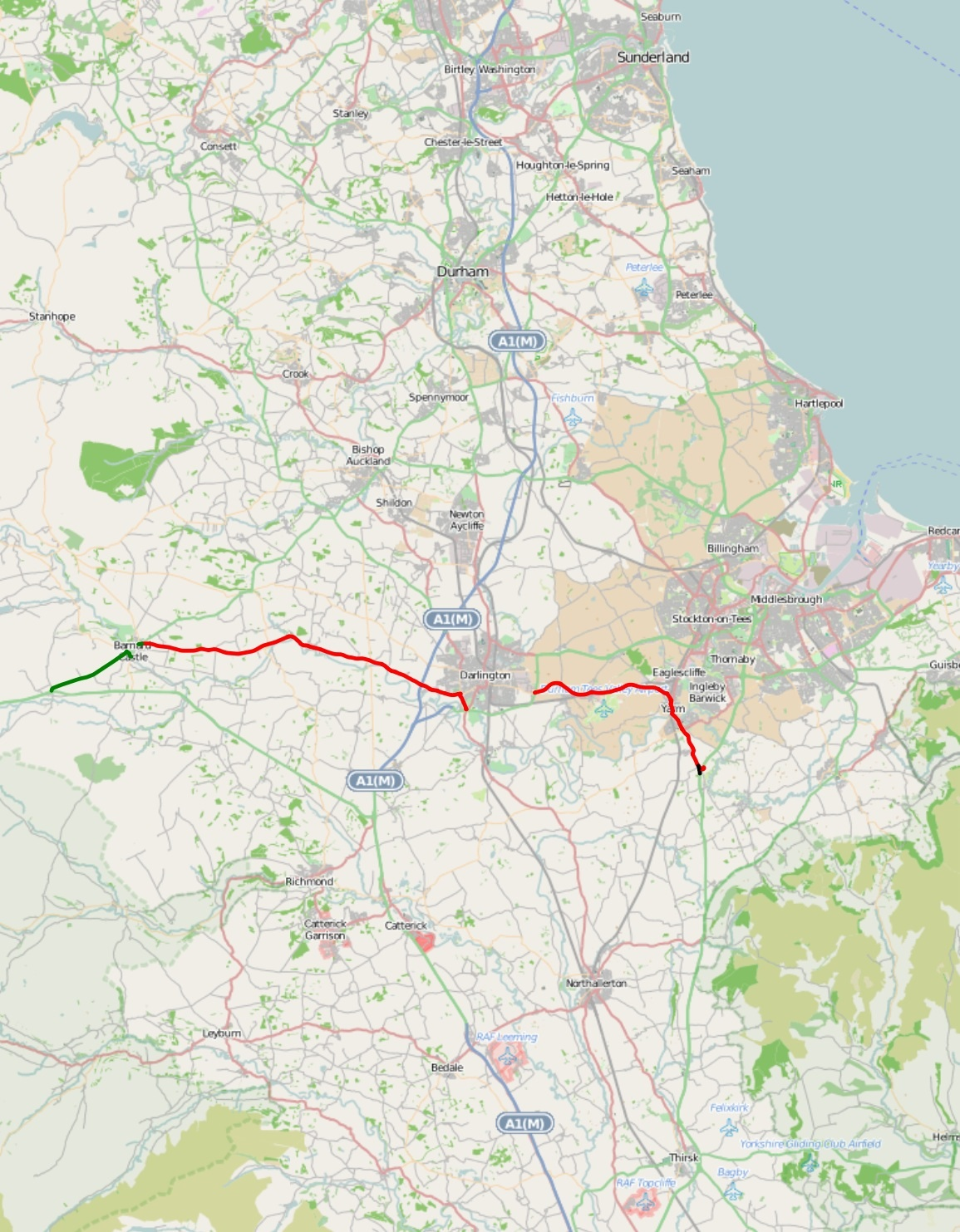
- Click map to enlarge

Route information
- Length: 33.1 mi (53.3 km)

Major junctions
- West end: A66 in Bowes
- A66 / A167 in Darlington
- East end: A19 near Crathorne

Location
- Country: United Kingdom
- Counties: County Durham; North Yorkshire
- Primary destinations: Barnard Castle; Darlington

Road network
- Roads in the United Kingdom; Motorways; A and B road zones
← A66	→ A68

The A67 is a road in England that links Bowes in County Durham with Crathorne in North Yorkshire. The road from Middlesbrough to Darlington was previously the A66 road, the road also starts and ends on the A66.

== Route ==
The section from the A66 to Barnard Castle is primary status; from that point it turns right and it loses its primary status to the A688 road. It then travels east through Gainford and crosses the A1(M) but does not have a junction with it. The road regains primary status as it goes concurrent with the A66 road from the Blackwell roundabout and heads along the southern edge of Darlington.

As the A66 heads north, the A67 leaves at Morton Park to head east past Dinsdale and Durham Tees Valley Airport before joining with the A135 in Eaglescliffe. From there it heads south through Yarm—crossing the Tees via Yarm Bridge —and Kirklevington before joining the A19 road at Crathorne.

The road has been described by a UK Government transport minister as an important commuter route and as being the gateway to Teesdale from Darlington. Despite its status as an important route, it is not maintained by National Highways but by the local authority. The section around Darlington and also onwards towards Middlesbrough was originally the A66.

== Safety ==
The 10-mile (16 km) stretch of road between the A66 at Morton Park and the A19 was named the third most improved road in 2013. Work on this section included vehicle activated signage, draining and resurfacing.

== Settlements ==
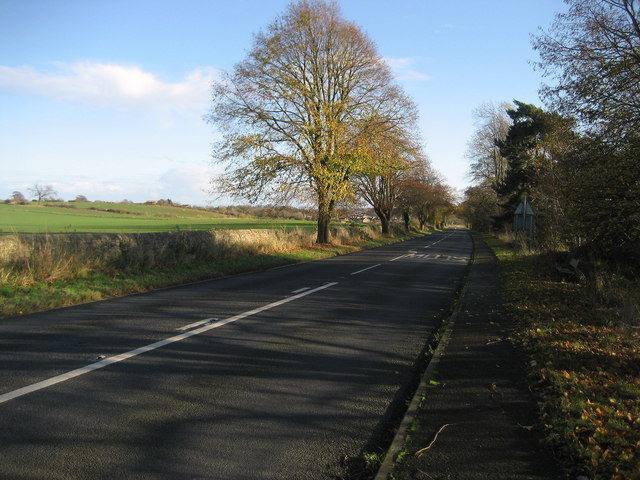
A67 west of Gainford

- Bowes (junction with A66 road)
- Barnard Castle
- Gainford
- Piercebridge
- Darlington
- Teesside International Airport
- Eaglescliffe
- Yarm
- Crathorne (junction with A19 road)

== Junction list ==
County	Location	mi	km	Destinations	Notes
County Durham	Bowes	0.0	0.0	A66 – Brough, Bowes, Scotch Corner	Western terminus
County Durham	Barnard Castle	4.9	7.9	A688 northeast (Prospect Place) – Bishop Auckland	Southwestern terminus of A688
County Durham	Darlington	19.9	32.0	A66 west (Bridge Road) / A167 (Grange Road / Croft Road) to A1(M) south / A168 – The South, Scotch Corner, Darlington, Northallerton, Thirsk	Western terminus of A66 concurrency
County Durham	Morton Palms	23.3	37.5	A66 east / B6280 (Yarm Road) to A1(M) north / A1150 – The North, Stockton, Middlesbrough, Teesside, Durham, Darlington	Stockton and M'brough signed eastbound only, To A1150, Teesside and Durham westbound only; eastern terminus of A66 concurrency
County Durham	Egglescliffe	29.7	47.8	A135 north (Yarm Road) – Stockton	Southern terminus of A135
County Durham– North Yorkshire boundary	Egglescliffe– Yarm boundary	29.8	48.0	Yarm Bridge over River Tees	
North Yorkshire	Yarm– Kirklevington boundary	31.1	50.1	A1044 northeast / B1264 (Green Lane) – Ingleby Barwick, Thornaby, Middlesbrough, Worsall	Southwestern terminus of A1044
North Yorkshire	Kirklevington– Crathorne boundary	32.9– 33.1	52.9– 53.3	A19 – The North, The South, Middlesbrough, Thirsk	Eastern terminus
1.000 mi = 1.609 km; 1.000 km = 0.621 mi: Concurrency terminus
