= List of lost settlements in the United Kingdom =

This list of lost settlements in the United Kingdom includes deserted medieval villages (DMVs), shrunken villages, abandoned villages and other settlements known to have been lost, depopulated or significantly reduced in size over the centuries. There are estimated to be as many as 3,000 DMVs in England. Grid references are given, where known.

== England ==
Note that in many cases English settlements are listed under the relevant historic county, rather than the modern administrative unit.

=== Bedfordshire ===
- Stratton, near Biggleswade
- Sheep Lane, between Woburn and Leighton Buzzard
- Ruxox, near Ampthill
- Kinwick, believed to be near Sandy
- Elvedon, believed to be near Pertenhall

=== Berkshire ===
- Barcote, near Littleworth, SU320979 (manor house survives) (now in Oxfordshire)
- Beckett, near Shrivenham, SU246892 (manor house survives) (now in Oxfordshire)
- Betterton, near Lockinge, SU431868 (manor house survives) (now in Oxfordshire)
- Bockhampton, near Lambourn, SU335782 (manor house survives)
- Calcote, near Hungerford (near, SU340698 (exact location unknown)
- Carswell, near Littleworth, SU325978 (now in Oxfordshire)
- Clapcot, near Brightwell, SU605916 (manor house survives)
- Cruchfield, near Bray, SU880740 (manor house survives)
- East Compton, near Compton, SU525796 (church survives)
- Draycott, Longworth, SU400994 (now in Oxfordshire)
- Eaton Hastings, SU260982 (church survives) (now in Oxfordshire)
- Endloss Ditton, near Luton
- Fulscot, near South Moreton, SU545888 (now in Oxfordshire)
- Henwick, near Thatcham, SU498686 (manor house survives)
- Hill End, near Wytham, SU466065 (now in Oxfordshire)
- Hodcot, near West Ilsley, SU477818
- Holt, near Kintbury, SU401645 (manor house survives)
- Langley, near Hampstead Norreys, SU498766 (manor house survives)
- Inglewood, near Kintbury, SU365666 (manor house survives)
- Maidencourt, near East Garston, SU373760
- Marlston, near Bucklebury, SU529719 (manor house survives)
- Newton, near Buckland, SU360980 (manor house extant) (now in Oxfordshire)
- Odstone, near Ashbury, SU271862 (now in Oxfordshire)
- Seacourt, near Wytham, SP486075 (good earthworks: road pattern discernible) (now in Oxfordshire)
- Shalford, near Brimpton, SU569648 (manor house extant)
- Sheffield, near Burghfield, SU653693
- East Shefford, SU391747 (manor house and church extant)
- Shottesbrooke, SU842771 (manor house and church extant)
- Southcote, near Denchworth, SU375910 (manor house extant) (now in Oxfordshire)
- Stroud, near Cumnor, SU444075 (now in Oxfordshire)
- Thrupp, near Radley, SU518973 (now in Oxfordshire)
- Tubney, near Appleton, SP446010 (manor house extant) (now in Oxfordshire)
- Whatcombe, near Fawley, SU393789
- Whitley, near Cumnor, SP442053 (exact location unknown) (now in Oxfordshire)
- Woolley, near Chaddleworth, SU410800 (manor house extant)
- Wyld Court, near Hampstead Norreys, SU543760

=== Buckinghamshire ===
From Beresford's Lost Villages except Old Wolverton.

- Ackhampstead, near Frieth, SU807907 – no visible remains at the site
- Addingrove, near Oakley, SP665113
- Doddershall, near Kingswood
- Ekeney, near Emberton (Borough of Milton Keynes)
- Fleet Marston, west of Aylesbury
- Old Wolverton (Milton Keynes)

=== Cambridgeshire ===
Includes former villages whose sites were in Huntingdonshire until the 1974 county boundary changes.

- Botolph Bridge, near Orton Longueville
- Whitwell, near Barton
- Burghley, possibly under Burghley House
- Clopton, Cambridgeshire, near Croydon
- Cratendune, near Ely
- Houghton, Cambridgeshire (medieval village)
- Howes
- Little Thetford near Little Thetford
- Sawtry Judith, near Sawtry (community based around lost abbey)
- Stonea Camp, deserted Iron Age hill fort in hamlet of Stonea
- Washingley, near Folksworth
- Weald and Wintringham, both near Eynesbury Hardwicke, St Neots

=== Cheshire ===
- Baddiley
- Haycroft
- Overton, near Malpas
- Tatton

=== Cumbria ===
- Mardale
- Snittlegarth

=== Derbyshire ===
- Agden Side, near Agden Reservoir
- Alkmonton medieval settlement, between Uttoxeter and Derby
- Ashopton, submerged under Ladybower Reservoir
- Cottons, near Normanton, Derby
- Derwent, submerged under Ladybower Reservoir
- Hungry Bentley, between Uttoxeter and Derby
- Phoside, near Glossop.
- Toxall, near Macclesfield

=== Devon ===
- Gawton – A port on the river Tamar abandoned in the early 20th century.
- Grimspound – a late Bronze Age settlement on Dartmoor
- Hallsands – Village and beach.
- Hundatorra, near Hound Tor (DMV. Now in the care of English Heritage )
- Hutholes, Widecombe-in-the-Moor, Dartmoor.
- Lacoma – a deserted medieval village on Exmoor.
- New Quay (Devon) – A port on the river Tamar abandoned in the early 20th century.
- Morwellham Quay – A port upstream from New Quay that was partially abandoned after the closure of most of the local mines in the early 20th century, now an open-air museum.
- Sutreworde, mentioned in the Domesday book, but abandoned in favour of nearby Lustleigh

=== Dorset ===
- Tyneham (taken over by the British Armed Forces during World War II)
- Maryland, on Brownsea Island—The village was originally created to serve an unsuccessful pottery business. Its inhabitants were ultimately expelled by the island's owner.
- Winterborne Farringdon

=== County Durham ===
- Carlbury, NZ217157 (mostly demolished in the late 1940s to make way for A67 road)
- Ulnaby, NZ226172 (abandoned in the 16th century)
- Fieldon Bridge, near Shildon, NZ20569 (known locally as "Fylands" built for mine workers at Coppy Crooks it was demolished, deemed uninhabitable, in the 1950s)
- Eden Pit, near Shildon, NZ24895 (east of Shildon and built to service the colliery of the same name, there were 37 houses, demolished in the 1960s)
- Riseburn, near Shildon, NZ25073 (consisted of three terraces with a small Primitive Methodist chapel, demolished in the 1940s)
- Marsden, near South Shields
- Addison, near Ryton
- Hamsteels, near Quebec

=== Gloucestershire ===
- Charlton (demolished in the late 1940s to make way for an extension of Filton Airfield)
- Lancaut
- Northwick, near Blockley
- Upper Ditchford

=== Herefordshire ===
- Chilstone
- Devereux
- Edvin Ralph
- Hampton Wafer
- Hewland
- Hoarwithy
- Holme Lacy
- Kilpeck
- Little Cowarne
- Lower Bullingham
- Studmarsh
- Wacton
- Wolferlow

=== Isle of Wight ===
- Abedestone, south of Ashey
- Alalei, in Apse Heath
- Alvington, south west of Gunville
- Appleford (Great, North and Upper), east of Chale Green
- Bagwich, north west of Godshill
- Barnsley, in Westridge
- Black Pan, in Lake
- Chalcroft, in Brading
- Cheverton, north of Shorwell and east of Cheverton Down
- Coombe, north of Brighstone and east of Rock
- Compton, near Compton Chine and Compton Down
- Done, near Chale, up Head Down
- Durton, north of Downend
- Gotten, south of Chale Green and Gotten Manor
- Haldley, in Carisbrooke
- Hardley, in Hillway
- Huffingford, in Blackwater
- Kern(e), north of Alverstone
- Lessland, north east of Sandford
- Levegarestun
- Loverstone, east of Chillerton and west of Rookley Green
- Luton, east of Mark's Corner and south of Northwood
- Moor (Farm), near Sandford
- Orham, near St Helens and Bembridge
- Preston, in Oakfield
- Rowborough, near St Helens and Brading
- Scaldeford, near Apse Heath and Lake
- Sheat, north of Gatcombe
- Shoflet, on the western bank of King's Quay
- Standen (East), south west of Downend
- Standen (West), south of Shide
- Stenbury, east of Whitwell
- Walpan, north of Walpen Chine
- Watchingwell (Lower and Upper), north of Apesdown and north east of Vittlefields
- Week, north of St Lawrence and east of Whitwell, up Week Down
- Whitcombe, east of Bowcombe and up Garstons Down
- Whitefield, in Whitefield Wood and east of Ashey
- Whitefield (Little), in Ashey
- Wilmingham, south of Yarmouth on the eastern bank of the River Yar.
- Woolverton, in Hillway
- Wolverton, south of Shorwell

=== Hertfordshire ===
- Aldwick, SP892175
- Alfledawich (Beauchamps), TL382314
- Alswick, TL376295
- Aspenden II, TL347288
- Ayot St Lawrence, TL194169
- Ayot St Peter, TL218150
- Berkeden (Berkesdon Green), TL335276
- Betlow, SP897172
- Bordesden (Bozen Green), TL412272
- Boxbury, TL274266
- Bricewold
- Brickendon, TL330105
- Broadfield, TL325310
- Broadmead, SP892175
- Burston, TL135037
- Caldecote, TL237385
- Chaldean, TL423205
- Chesfield, TL247278
- Childwick, TL141107
- Cockenach, TL396302
- Cockhamsted, TL419253
- Corney Bury, TL358307
- Digswell, TL236149
- Flaunden, TL009988
- Flexmere, TL168224
- Gilston, TL440135
- Great Munden, TL355243
- Gubblecote, SP905152
- Hainstone
- Hanstead, TL143017
- Hixham, TL454268
- Hodenhoe, TL346334
- Ichetone (Layston), TL370300
- Kitts End, TL245984
- Lewarewich (Leverage) near, TL435165
- Libury (Stutereshele), TL345235
- Mardley, TL259185
- Maydencroft (Furnival Dinsley), TL182274
- Minsden, TL198246
- Miswell, SP912120
- Moor Green, TL321266
- Napsbury, TL165043
- Nettleden II, TL015104
- Newsells, TL386372
- North Mymms, TL222045
- Oxwich near Codicote
- Oston
- Pendley, SP944117
- Plashes, TL382203
- Queenhoo, TL278162
- Quickswood, TL278328
- Sapeham
- Stagenhoe, TL186227
- Stanstead Abbotts, TL399110
- Stevenage, TL240262
- Stivicesworde
- Stocks, SP962133
- Stonebury, TL384282
- Temple Dinsley, TL182248
- Thorley, TL476188
- Throcking, TL337303
- Thundridge, TL368175
- Tiscott, SP883178
- Titburst (Theobald Street), TL180995
- Wakeley, TL342269
- Wandon, TL132225
- Wellbury, TL142298
- Welei (Wain Wood)
- Wickham, TL475230
- Windridge, TL125057
- Wollenwick (Woolwicks), TL222253

=== Kent ===
See Lost villages of the Romney Marsh for more detail.

- Buttdarts (over one of the larger marsh drains), TR071296
- Dengemarsh, south of Lydd
- Dode (Dowde), TQ669638, in Luddesdowne parish near Gravesend
- Eastbridge, TR078319
- Fairfield, TQ977270
- Falconhurst, TR076344
- Galloways, not marked on OS Map: ?TR 0017
- Hampton-on-Sea, TR156679
- Hope All Saints, TR049258
- Midley, SW of Old Romney, TR016237
- Orgarswick, NW of Dymchurch, TR090309
- Paddlesworth, near Snodland, TQ624681
- Shorne, TR049258
- Shuart, TR2688067886
- Snave, TR015299
- Stone Chapel near Ospringe

=== Lancashire ===
- Fairhurst, lost hamlet near Parbold
- Gambleside, abandoned in 1866
- Greenbooth, abandoned and submerged village under a reservoir
- Watergrove, abandoned and submerged village under a reservoir

=== Leicestershire ===
- Aldeby SK552987 Deserted Medieval Village in Enderby, now known as St Johns after its ruined parish church
- Allhallows SK785361 Lost place in Redmile, recorded as Alhallowes in 1579
- Alton SK390148 Deserted Medieval Village in Ravenstone
- Alwolton Lost place in Hoby, recorded in 1322 as Utteralwolton where Utter means outer or remote
- Ambion SK400003 Deserted Medieval Village in Sutton Cheney, reputedly abandoned at the time of the Battle of Bosworth
- Andreskirk SK392222 Deserted Medieval Village in Breedon on the Hill, located to its west
- Atterton SP353983 Deserted Medieval Village
- Baggrave SK697088 Deserted Medieval Village in Hungarton
- Beacon Hill SK513146 Lost place in Woodhouse Eaves, site of an Iron Age hill fort, perhaps a lookout over the Soar valley for the Corieltauvi tribe
- Beckingthorpe SK808394 Lost place in Bottesford, recorded as Beclintorp about 1300
- Berehill SK587046 Lost place in St Margaret's Field, recorded as le Berehil in 1260, it lay outside the East Gate of Leicester, forming part of the east suburb and subsequently was named the Haymarket
- Bescaby SK823623 Deserted Medieval Village
- Bigging, Lost place in Leicester, recorded as le Bigginge in 1323, it was a group of buildings close to the abbey of St Mary de Pratis, perhaps near SK580062
- Bishop's Fee SK505051 Lost Place in St Margaret's Field Leicester, recorded as feodo Episcopi in 1336 and called The Suburb in Domesday, it was the property of the Bishop of Lincoln and included St Margaret's Field
- Bittesby Deserted Medieval Village, perhaps formed out of a larger, earlier parish centred on a former Romano-British settlement at Duninc Wicon that also included Ullesthorpe as an outlying settlement
- Bradgate SK535103 Deserted Medieval Village in Newtown Linford, abandoned for the building of Bradgate House
- Bradley SP823954 Lost place in Nevill Holt, recorded as Bradel in the 12th century, and the site of an Augustinian Priory from about 1200
- Brascote SK443025 Deserted Medieval Village in Newbold Verdon
- Brentingby SK784198 Deserted Medieval Village
- Bromkinsthorpe SK560040 Lost place in St Mary's Field Leicester, now Braunstone Gate
- Brooksby SK670160 Deserted Medieval Village
- Bulwarks, The SK405233 Lost place in Breedon on the Hill, site of an Iron Age hill fort, perhaps in the western border zone of the Corieltauvi tribe
- Burrough Hill SK770120 Lost place in Burrough on the Hill, site of an Iron Age hill fort, perhaps the central place of the Corieltauvi tribe before the Roman invasion
- Burrowchurch SK835185 Lost place in Wymondham, located to its west
- Canby SK605170 Lost place in Sileby which gave its name to one of the three Sileby medieval great fields
- Charleyston Lost place in Charley recorded in 1280
- Colby SK617090 Lost place in Thurmaston close to boundary with Humberstone
- Cold Newton SK716065 Deserted Medieval Village
- Cotes de Val SP553887 Deserted Medieval Village in Gilmorton
- Dishley SK513212 Deserted Medieval Village
- Dodyngton Lost place in Rearsby, recorded about 1480
- Doveland SK560043 Lost place in St Mary's Field, Leicester, recorded about 1230
- Duninc Wicon SP495870 Lost place in Ullesthorpe, recorded in 962AD, possibly to be rendered as Dunna's wic (vicus), it was perhaps the site of a Romano British township located towards Watling Street
- Elmesthorpe SP460965 Deserted Medieval Village
- Eye Kettleby SK734167 Deserted Medieval Village in Melton Mowbray
- Foston SP604950 Deserted Medieval Village
- Freake's Ground SK575054 Lost place in Leicester, recorded as Mr Freakes Land in 1625, it lay between the Groby and Fosse Roads, it became an extra-parochial area
- Frisby SK704020 Deserted Medieval Village between Billesdon and Gaulby
- Frogmire SK581052 Lost place in Leicester, recorded as Frogemere in 1196, it lay between two arms of the River Soar outside the North Gate, it is now represented by Frog Island
- Garendon SK502199 Deserted Medieval Village in Loughborough
- Gillethorp or Godthorp SK770100 Lost place included in Domesday as Godtorp and as Gillethorp in the Leicestershire Survey of about 1130, it lay between Somerby and Newbold Saucey
- Gilroes SK560065 Lost place in Leicester Frith, recorded as Gilleuro in 1322
- (Goadby Marwood) SK780270 Lost site of a minor Romano-British settlement, a vicus, established alongside the Roman road from the Fosse Way at Six Hills towards the Ermine Street at Spitalgate, near Grantham in Lincolnshire. There is no evidence of its location within the parish or its name
- Gopsall SK353064 Deserted Medieval Village in Twycross
- Great Stretton SK657005 Deserted Medieval Village, its parish church remains
- Hamilton SK645075 Deserted Medieval Village in Barkby Thorpe
- Hardwick Lost place in Bottesford, recorded about 1220 as Herdewic
- Hardwick SP720970 Lost place in Shangton, recorded 1252 as Herdwyk
- Hogston Lost place in Sileby, recorded in the 17th century as Hogston side
- Holyoaks SP845957 Deserted Medieval Village in Stockerston
- Hothorpe SP669851 Lost place in Theddingworth, in the 18th century the home of the Lord of the Manor, which at the time of Domesday extended south of the River Welland into present day Northamptonshire where it now lies
- Hungerton SP625985 Lost place in Wigston Magna, recorded about 1285 as Hungertonhill, not to be confused with Hungarton
- Hygham Lost place in Wycomb and Chadwell, recorded in 1582, it gave its name to one of the parish medieval great fields
- Ingarsby SK684055 Deserted Medieval Village in Hungarton, often called Old Ingarsby to differentiate it from modern New Ingarsby which lies to the north west of Houghton on the Hill
- Keythorpe SP765995 Deserted Medieval Village in Tugby
- Kilwardby SK354166 Lost place in Ashby de la Zouch, now represented by Kilwardby Street
- Knaptoft SP626895 Deserted Medieval Village, the remnants of the parish church remain
- Knave Hill SP744943 Lost place in Stonton Wyville, a local name for Langton Caudle which is the site of an abandoned Saxon settlement pinpointed by archaeological excavation
- Leesthorpe SK792136 Deserted Medieval Village in Pickwell
- Leroes Lost place in St Margaret's Field Leicester, recorded in 1346 as le Leywro
- Lilinge Lost place either between Ullesthorpe and Bitteswell or in Westrill and Starmore adjacent to Lilbourne Northamptonshire, it was included in Domesday in Guthlaxton Wapentake
- Lindley SP365958 Deserted Medieval Village in Higham on the Hill, now under the Motor Industry Research Association (MIRA) Proving Ground
- Longton Lost place in Humberstone, recorded in 1612
- Lowesby SK725078 Deserted Medieval Village
- Lowton Lost place in Humberstone recorded about 1480
- Lubbesthorpe SK541011 Deserted Medieval Village
- Luffnum Lost place in Humberstone, recorded about 1730, perhaps similar in origin to the place-name Luffenham in Rutland
- Manduessedum SP330968 Lost Place in Witherley, it was a Romano British settlement extending into Mancetter Warwickshire at the junction of Watling Street and the Roman road Fenn Lane from Leicester
- (Medbourne) SP796929 Lost Romano-British town on the Roman road from Godmanchester to Leicester. The site remains unknown, no name survives for the town and Medbourne field names do not indicate its probable location
- Mirabel SP845957 Lost place in Stockerston, recorded as hermitagii de Mirabel in 1232, located close, and in opposition to the pagan centre at Holyoaks, it is now represented by Great and Little Merrible Woods
- Misterton SP556840 Deserted Medieval Village, the parish church, the minster of the place-name, remains
- Nafferton Lost place in Foston, recorded in 1619
- Naneby SK435025 Deserted Medieval Village in Cadeby
- Netone Lost place included in Domesday in Gartree Wapentake
- Newarke, The SK582041 Lost place in Leicester, recorded as le Newerk in 1361, it lay outside the town wall by the castle and was itself walled round
- Newbold Folville SK706120 Deserted Medieval Village in Ashby Folville
- Newbold Saucey SK765090 Deserted Medieval Village in Owston
- New Park of Bird's Nest, The SK560058 Lost place in Leicester Frith, recorded as Briddesnest in 1362, it is now represented by the New Parks suburb of the city
- Normandy Lost Place in St Margaret's Field Leicester, recorded in 1453
- Normanton Turville SP489995 Deserted Medieval Village
- North Marefield SK752088 Deserted Medieval Village, now often called Old Marefield
- Noseley SP733987 Deserted Medieval Village
- Othorpe SP771995 Deserted Medieval Village in Slawston
- Quenby SK702065 Deserted Medieval Village in Hungarton
- Ratae Corieltauvorum SK582045 Lost place replaced by Leicester, it was the Romano British cantonal capital of the Corieltauvi (formerly known as Coritani) tribe whose previous centre was probably Burrough Hill in the county, and who named it Ratis before the Roman invasion. When, how and why Ratae/Ratis transformed into Legorensium by 787AD is unknown
- Ringlethorpe SK776235 Deserted Medieval Village in Scalford, now the location of Goldsmith Grange
- St Clement SK581048 Lost place in Leicester, recorded in 1220, it was one of its medieval parishes and lay in the west quarter
- St Leonard SK580055 Lost place in Leicester, recorded in 1220, it was one of its medieval parishes and lay over the North, or St Sunday's Bridge
- St Mary in Arden SP741875 Lost Place in medieval Great Bowden, now Market Harborough, perhaps the original centre of an early parish that included both Great and Little Bowden, any link with the Forest of Arden Warwickshire is unproven
- St Michael SK584049 Lost place in Leicester, recorded in 1220, it was one of its medieval parishes and lay in the north quarter
- St Peter SK585047 Lost place in Leicester, recorded in 1200, it was one of its medieval parishes and lay in the north quarter
- Sauvey SK786052 Lost place in Withcote, recorded as Salvee in 1229, was the location of Sauvey Castle
- Shelthorpe SK545185 Deserted Medieval Village in Loughborough
- Schirdiccotes Lost place in Thurmaston, recorded about 1320, a similar name to Shirtecoat in Great Bowden
- Schyrdaycotis Lost place in Newton Harcourt, recorded in the 14th century, a similar name to Shirtecoat in Great Bowden
- Shirtecoat SP740900 Lost place in Great Bowden, recorded about 1250, located in the medieval great North Field of the parish, perhaps meaning derelict cottages or summer shelters
- Schortecotes Lost place in Horninghold, recorded about 1300, perhaps a similar name to Shirtecoat in Great Bowden
- Shoby SK683203 Deserted Medieval Village
- Shouldercoates Lost place in Twyford, although only recorded in 1826 and as such a possible echo of a medieval name, it may be similar in meaning to Shirtecoat in Great Bowden or to be interpreted as the cottages on the hill shoulder
- South Marefield SK746079 Lost place represented by modern Marefield, in Domesday it was included as alia Merdefelde to distinguish it from the now deserted North Marefield which was also called Old Marefield
- Stapleford SK813183 Deserted Medieval Village
- Staunton Harold SK379209 Deserted Medieval Village
- Stocking, The SK583078 Lost place in Beaumont Leys Leicester, recorded as le Stokkynge in 1352, now represented by the Stocking Farm suburb of the city
- Stormsworth SP583806 Deserted Medieval Village in Westrill and Starmore, the name has evolved into Starmore
- Sysonby SK739190 Deserted Medieval Village in Melton Mowbray, traditionally where the River Eye became the River Wreake
- Tomley SP552795 Lost place in Catthorpe, recorded as Tomlowe in 1343, perhaps relating to a Tom Thumb type character and to be rendered as Hobgoblin's Mound
- Toston SK800370 Lost place in Bottesford, recorded as Toxtonhyl in 1304, now represented by Toston Hill
- Tripontium SP535795 Lost Place in Shawell, perhaps commemorating stream crossings at Dow Bridge SK542782 in Catthorpe and Bransford Bridge SK519822 in Cotesbach, the third crossing was at Caves Inn in Shawell, it was a Romano British settlement extending into Warwickshire on Roman Watling Street located at modern Caves Inn Farm
- Venonis SK474888 Lost place at the meeting point of Claybrooke Magna and Parva and Sharnford, now represented by High Cross, it was a Romano British settlement extending into Warwickshire at the crossing point of the Roman Fosse Way and Watling Street, inhabited by the Corieltauvi who named it The Place of the Tribe (Venonis)
- Vernemeton SK650250 Lost place in Willoughby on the Wolds Nottinghamshire, A Romano British settlement on Fosse Way whose territory extended into Old Dalby and Wymeswold, Horrou and Harrowefield in Wymeswold probably relate to the same sacred grove commemorated in the name Vernemeton
- Welby SK725210 Deserted Medieval Village
- Wellsborough SK365024 Deserted Medieval Village in Sibson
- Westcotes SK570300 Lost place in St Mary's Field Leicester
- Westerby SP675925 Lost place incorporated with neighbouring Smeeton into Smeeton Westerby by 1279
- Weston Lost place in Beeby, recorded in 1601, gave its name to one of the Beeby great medieval fields which lay west of the boundary with Hungarton
- Weston SK303027 Deserted Medieval Village in Orton on the Hill, now the location of Moor Barns Farm
- Westrill Lost place in Westrill and Starmore, recorded as Westerhyll in 1578, perhaps located at Gravel Hill SP580800
- Westthorpe Lost place in Bottesford, recorded as Westorp in 1249. Easthorpe is still a settlement in the parish
- Whatborough SK767060 Deserted Medieval Village
- Whenham SK725238 Lost place in Ab Kettleby that gave its name to a field in the parish, it was probably sited close to Landyke Lane, the Roman road from the Fosse Way at Six Hills to Ermine Street near Grantham
- Whittington SP486083 Deserted Medieval Village in Ratby
- Willesley SK340146 Deserted Medieval Village
- Willows SK660180 Deserted Medieval Village in Ragdale
- Wistow SP644958 Deserted Medieval Village
- Withcote SK797059 Deserted Medieval Village
- Woodcote SK354187 Deserted Medieval Village in Ashby de la Zouch
- Wyfordby SK792189 Deserted Medieval Village

=== Lincolnshire ===
- Aunby, TF022146
- Avethorpe, Location unknown
- Banthorp near Greatford,TF062110 See Banthorpe Wood.
- Casewick North East Uffington, TF077090 – The name survives in Casewick Hall.
- Casthorpe near Barrowby, SK869355 (East Casthorpe), SK861357 (West Casthorpe)
- Beckfield, Kirmond le Mire, TF190927
- Birthorpe, Billingborough, TF105344
- Burreth, Lincolnshire
- Brauncewell, east of Modern Brauncewell, TF046524
- Bruer, TF008537 Controversially listed as DMV by Beresford & Hurst.
- Butyate, near Bardney TF134718
- Coates medieval settlement, near Stow
- Cold Hanworth medieval settlement, at Cold Hanworth
- Crofton TF055402
- Dembleby Shrunken village TF038378
- Dunsby, east of Brauncewell TF039514 Note there is a surviving village of the same name in the south of the county.
- Elsthorpe, near Edenham. TF055245
- Gainsthorpe, near Kirton Lindsey, SK955012 (One of the best-preserved DMV sites in Britain, now in the care of English Heritage
- Ganthorpe, Stoke Rochford.SK924291
- Goltho, TF114775
- Graby shrunken village west of Dowsby, TF101297
- Hanby, TF027316
- Little Lavington, near Lenton, TF030310 Recorded as late as 1846.
- Newbo near Barrowby, SK867382
- North Cadeby, TF271960
- North Rauceby shrunken village, TF021463
- North Stoke, Stoke Rochford.SK916284
- Orford, south of Brookenby, TF198946
- Osgodby, South of Lenton, Lincolnshire, TF020280 The name is preserved in the farm at the location, and in the parish name.
- Ouesby, Billingborough, TF105343
- Ringsthorpe, west of Barkston, SK927414
- Ringstone, south of Rippingale, TF094270
- Roxton, south of Immingham. TA 1668 1275
- Sempringham shrunken village, TF105328
- Sapperton, Somewhere near Welbourn, See also un-named village near Welbourn,
- Scott Willougbhy shrunken village TF052376
- Silkby near Silk Willoughby, TF047431
- Skinnand, SK941575 Shown on OS map
- Southorpe, near Edenham. TF043248
- Sudwelle near Swayfield, SK986227
- Thorpe, Laythorpe and Burgh, location unknown, all associated with Kirkby la Thorpe
- Twyford south of Colsterworth, SK929229 Note: there is a similarly named surviving village at SK728103 – The name at Colsterworth is preserved in nearby woodland.
- Waterton, SE857181
- West Laughton, west of LaughtonTF074311
- Wyham, TF277951
- West WykehamTF217885
- East WykehamTF226882
- Wykeham (Nettleton)TF120972

=== Merseyside ===
- Stanlow Island

=== Middlesex ===
- Heathrow (sometimes "Heath Row"). Demolished in the 1940s to allow construction of what was then London Airport, renamed Heathrow Airport in 1966.

=== Norfolk ===
There are believed to be around 200 lost settlements in Norfolk. Many of these are deserted medieval villages.

=== Northamptonshire ===
See also List of lost settlements in Northamptonshire.

- Achurch
- Althorp, SP678648
- Appletree
- Armston
- Astwell
- Astwick
- Badsaddle, SP833730
- Barford, SP853828
- Boughton, SP901816
- Braunston Cleves or Fawcliff, SP544682
- Braunstonbury, SP533656
- Brime
- Brockhall
- Burghley
- Calme
- Caswell
- Canons Ashby, SP576507
- Cotes
- Coton, SP673717
- Cotton, near Grendon, SP874610
- Cotton Mill
- Cotton Mallows
- Chilcote, SP658747
- Churchfield
- Church Charwelton, SP544554
- Doddington Thorpe, SP871656
- Downtown, SP615801
- Eaglethorpe
- Eastern Neston
- Edgcote
- Elmington in Ashton
- Elmington in Tansor
- Elkington, SP626762
- Falcutt
- Fawsley, SP561566
- Foscote
- Faxton, SP784752
- Field Burcote
- Foxley
- Furtho
- Glassthorpe, SP662617
- Glendon, SP847814
- Great Purston
- Hale
- Holdenby, SP692675
- Horton, SP821542
- Hothorpe, SP667852
- Kelmarsh, SP743794
- Kingsthorpe
- Kirby, SP925925
- Kirby in Blakesley
- Kirby in Gretton
- Knuston, SP938662
- Lilford
- Little Creaton, SP712716
- Little Newton, SP887833
- Little Oxendon, SP733845
- Lolham
- Lower Catesby, SP515597
- Mawsley, SP805763
- Milton
- Murcott, SP620677
- Muscott, SP627633
- Nether Catesby
- Newbottle, SP777815
- Newbottle in Harrington
- Nobold, SP695821
- Nobottle
- Nunton
- Papley
- Perio
- Pipewell, SP839857
- Potcote
- Preston Deanery, SP787555
- Onley, SP511707
- Overstone, SP806657
- Rushton Saint Peter, SP837827
- Seawell
- Sibberton
- Silsworth, SP617707
- Snorscomb, SP598561
- Stanford, SP589788
- Steane
- Strixton, SP902617
- Stuchbury
- Sulby, SP653816
- Thorpe, SP865630
- Thorpe Lubenham
- Thrupp, SP598650
- Torpel
- Trafford
- Upper Catesby, SP528594
- Upton
- Walcot
- Walton
- Winwick, SP627737
- Wolfhampcote, SP533656
- Woodcroft
- Wothorpe
- Wythmail, SP842721

=== Northumberland ===
- Anterchester, NT829337
- Bockenfield, NZ181978
- West Backworth, NZ294723

=== Nottinghamshire ===
- Adbolton, SK600384
- Algarthorpe, SK555425
- Annesley, SK504524
- Babworth, SK685809
- Beesthorpe, SK730605
- Bilby, SK639832
- Bingham, SK714397
- Bolham, SK704826
- Broadbusk, SK688480
- Broxtowe, SK527427
- Carburton, SK611733
- Clowne, SK579737
- Clumber, SK627747
- Colston Basset, SK695338
- Over Colwick, SK602390
- Cratley or Crastell, SK666640
- Dallington, SK778429
- Danethorpe, SK842577
- East Chilwell, SK540380
- East Stoke, SK748501
- Farworth, SK629894
- Flawford, SK593332
- Fleecethorpe, SK629836
- Gleadthorpe, SK592701
- Greasley, SK489471
- Grimston Hill, SK682658
- Haughton, SK692730
- Hempshill, SK525441
- Hermeston, SK589884
- Holbeck, SK658527
- Holme Pierrepont, SK624393
- Horsepool, SK706478
- Keighton, SK542382
- Kilvington, SK801429
- Kinoulton, SK662304
- Knapthorpe, SK740588
- Langford, SK822591
- Little Gringley, SK734811
- Meering, SK818655
- Milnthorpe, SK578723
- Moorhouse, SK753667
- Morton in Babworth, SK677801
- Morton in Lenton, SK547373
- Nettleworth, SK549658
- Newbold
- Normanton, SK650747
- Osberton, SK624800
- Ossington, SK760650
- Oswaldbeck, SK777855
- Plumtree, SK632923
- Rayton, SK615793
- Rempstone, SK575245
- Rufford, SK657641
- Serlby, SK633895
- South Wheatley, SK767856
- Stanton-on-the-Wolds, SK631307
- Sutton Passeys, SK530390
- Swanston, SK810750
- Thoresby, SK648712
- Thorney, SK860726
- Thorpe in the Glebe, SK607258
- Tiln, SK703842
- Wainscarre, SK615877
- Wansley, SK461515
- Warby, SK633324
- Welham, SK727822
- West Burton, SK798855
- Whimpton Village, SK795740
- Willoughby by Norwell, SK788632
- Willoughby by Walesby, SK689708
- Winkerfield, SK630606
- Wiverton, SK715365
- Woodcoates, SK780718
- Woolsthorpe, SK655464

=== Oxfordshire ===
For former villages whose sites were in Berkshire until the 1974 county boundary changes please see the Berkshire section, above.

- Asterleigh, south-west of Kiddington, SP399223
- Brookend, north-west of Chastleton, SP240311
- Clare, north-west of Pyrton, SU674984
- Ditchley, south of Enstone, SP390212
- Dornford, north-east of Wootton, SP449205
- Hordley, south-east of Wootton, SP447192
- Nether Chalford, south-east of Old Chalford, SP348258
- Rycote, or Rycote Magna, south-west of Thame, SP667047
- Shelswell, west of Newton Purcell, SP611309
- Tusmore, south of Brackley, SP562309
- Wheatfield, south of Tetsworth, SU689992
- Widford, west of Swinbrook, SP272120
- Willaston, east of Hethe, SP602297

=== Rutland ===
- Alsthope, east of Oakham
- Exton shrunken village, SK921110
- Hardwick, SK965122 – Site of the Battle of Losecote Field
- Horn, SK952117
- Ingthorpe, Tinwell SK996089
- Martinsthorpe, south of Oakham, SK866044
- Pickworth shrunken village, SK992138

=== Shropshire ===
- Upton Cressett medieval settlement, at Upton Cressett

=== Somerset ===
- Clicket, a small village abandoned by 1891.
- Moreton, abandoned in the early 1950s to allow the creation of Chew Valley Lake reservoir.
- Nether Adber, medieval settlement predating current village of Marston Magna.

=== Suffolk ===
- Akethorpe, now part of Lowestoft
- Alnesbourne in Hallowtree parish south-east of Ipswich
- Alston St. John
- Chilton, east of Sudbury
- Croscroft, near Sotterley in Wangford Hundred
- Dunningworth
- Dunwich TM475705, a significant medieval town 9 miles (14 km) south of Southwold, now largely lost to coastal erosion: the western fringes survive as a village
- Easton Bavents, lost to coastal erosion
- Fakenham Parva
- Little Redisham, emparked with the parish combined with Ringsfield in 1627
- Monks Risbridge, between Stradishall and Barnardiston
- Manton, also known as Manetuna (named in the Domesday Book along with the entry for Kettlebaston)
- Slaughden, lost to coastal erosion
- Sotterley, suspected emparked village
- Wordwell
- Worlingham Parva, near North Cove. At the Domesday survey probably part of Worlingham

=== Surrey ===
- Cuddington (demolished to allow construction of Nonsuch Palace; now lies under Nonsuch Park)
- Gatton

=== Sussex ===
- Apuldram SU838033
- Balmer TQ360100
- Balsdean TQ378040
- Barpham TQ070093
- Binderton SU847107
- Burton SU968176
- Charlton SZ880972
- Cudlow TQ024005
- East Itchenor SZ796996
- Erringham TQ207078
- Ford TQ003037
- Hangleton TQ272078
- Heene (in Worthing) TQ138027
- Kingston Buci TQ236053
- Lordington SU781098
- Lowfield Heath (in Surrey until 1974; church extant) TQ249400
- Manxey TQ651070
- Monkton SU824150
- Northeye TQ681070
- Old Shoreham TQ21400575
- Pangdean TQ294116
- Parham TQ060140
- Pende TQ1803
- Perching TQ242103
- Poyningstown or Chingting TV504986
- Southerham TQ429093
- South Heighton TQ451030
- Stanmer TQ21400575
- Streethill TQ357122
- Sutton TQ428034
- The Lydds TQ428034
- Tidemills TQ460002

=== Warwickshire ===
- Cestersover TL259185
- Stretton Baskerville
- Upper and Lower Smite
- Wolfhampcote

=== Wiltshire ===
- East Stowell, Wilcot – abandoned in 19th century; a farm remains
- Imber – commandeered for military use in 1943
- Marten, Grafton – deserted medieval village
- Old Sarum – replaced by Salisbury from 13th century
- Shaw, West Overton – deserted medieval village
- Sheldon, Chippenham Without – deserted medieval village
- Snap, near Aldbourne – abandoned in early 20th century
- Witherington, Downton – abandoned in 15th century; a farm remains
- Wyck, near Tisbury – deserted in 14th century

=== Worcestershire ===
- Elmley Lovett
- Grafton Flyford
- Rock moated site and medieval village, at Rock

=== Yorkshire ===
- Argam, in the East Riding of Yorkshire
- Clotherholme, in North Yorkshire
- Colden Parva, in the East Riding of Yorkshire
- Easington (in the Forest of Bowland)
- East Tanfield, near Ripon
- Henderskelfe, near Castle Howard
- High Worsall, near Yarm
- Howgrave, near Ripon
- Lodge, North Yorkshire in Upper Nidderdale
- Newsham, near Bempton
- Skipsea DMV, near Skipsea
- Stainsby, near Thornaby
- Wharram Percy DMV, near Malton, SE859645 (One of the best-preserved DMV sites in Britain, now in the care of English Heritage)

== Scotland ==
=== Argyll ===
- Inveraray, the original settlement dating to at least 1472 when it was made into a burgh, of which no traces remain. Situated by the banks of the River Aray, demolished after the new (current) town was built half a mile away in the 18th century

=== Aberdeenshire ===
- Forvie, settlement abandoned due to encroaching sand-dunes
- Kincardine, formerly the county town of Kincardineshire
- Rattray, Aberdeenshire, settlement abandoned due to encroaching sand-dunes

=== Berwickshire ===
- Bassendean, Scottish Borders
- Duns, Modern town 1 km away from the original burgh which was destroyed by the English three times in the 16th century
- Langton, original village cleared to make way for parkland and replaced by the modern Gavinton

=== Caithness ===
- Badbea

=== East Ayrshire ===
- Glenbuck

=== East Lothian ===
- East Barns, Dunbar
- Tyninghame, original village cleared to make way for parkland in 1761. New village lies to the west.
- Yester or Bothans, original village replaced to the North in the 18th century by the planned village of Gifford

=== Fife ===
- Binnend
- Lassodie

=== Highland ===
- Boreraig, Isle of Skye. Clearance village

=== Lanarkshire ===
- Bothwellhaugh, inundated under Strathclyde Loch

=== Moray ===
- Findhorn, original settlement lost to inundation

=== Na h-Eileanan Siar ===
- St. Kilda, forced evacuation in the early 20th century

=== Peeblesshire ===
- Hawkshaw, Scottish Borders

=== Perthshire ===
- Pitmiddle

=== Roxburghshire ===
- Old Jedward, House near site, 4 miles (6.4 km) south of Jedburgh
- Riccarton Junction, abandoned following the closure of the Waverley Route
- Roxburgh, Substantial settlement founded by David I as one of his first Royal Burghs, acted as de facto capital of Scotland, and destroyed repeatedly during the Wars of Scottish Independence. The Royal Burgh was finally abandoned in the late 15th century.
- Rutherford, Farm now on site, 4 miles (6.4 km) east of St Boswells

== Wales ==
=== Anglesey ===
- Nant Mawr, Llaneugrad
- Bodgynddelw, Llaneugrad, Farmhouse still exists by modern name 'Bodgynda'.

=== Blaenau Gwent ===
- Troedrhiwgwair

=== Bridgend ===
- Kenfig, abandoned by the 15th century

=== Caerphilly ===
- Pantywaun
- Troedrhiwfuwch, abandoned due to landslide risk

=== Cardiff ===
- Newtown
- Temperance Town, demolished to make way for Cardiff Bus Station

=== Carmarthenshire ===
- Machynys

=== Gwynedd ===
- Capel Celyn, submerged by the Llyn Celyn reservoir
- Cwmorthin
- Porth y Nant

=== Monmouthshire ===
- Penterry
- Runston
- St. Brides Netherwent
- St Pierre, Monmouthshire
- Trellech
- Y Graig

=== Neath Port Talbot ===
- Groes, demolished to make way for the M4 motorway
- Pantyffynnon

=== Powys ===
- Dylife, former mining community
- Llanwddyn, submerged by the Lake Vyrnwy reservoir
- Mynydd Epynt, farming community now used as army training land

=== Vale of Glamorgan ===
- Cosmeston

== Northern Ireland ==
=== Antrim ===
- Galboly village

=== Down ===
- Copeland Island
- Lighthouse Island
