= Wykeham =

Wykeham may refer to:

== Places ==
=== Current settlements ===
- Wykeham, Ryedale, North Yorkshire, England
- Wykeham, Scarborough, North Yorkshire, England
  - Wykeham railway station
- Wykeham Township, Todd County, Minnesota, U.S.

=== Deserted medieval villages ===
- East Wykeham, Ludford, Lincolnshire
- West Wykeham, Ludford, Lincolnshire
- Wykeham, Nettleton, Lincolnshire
- Wykeham, Weston, Lincolnshire

== People ==
- William of Wykeham (1320/4–1404), English bishop and chancellor
- Peter Wykeham (1915–1995), British Second World War flying ace
- Wykeham McNeill (born 1957), Jamaican politician
- Wykeham Leigh Pemberton (1833–1918), British Army officer

== Other uses ==
- The Wykeham Collegiate, private girls' school in Pietermaritzburg, South Africa

== See also ==
- Wickham (disambiguation)
- Wycombe (disambiguation)
- Winchester College, whose pupils are known as Wykehamists
