= Wykeham, Lincolnshire =

Wykeham, Lincolnshire may refer to several deserted villages in Lincolnshire, England:

- East Wykeham, in the civil parish of Ludford
- West Wykeham, in the civil parish of Ludford
- Wykeham, Nettleton, Lincolnshire, near Nettleton Top, Nettleton
- Wykeham, Weston, Lincolnshire, in the civil parish of Weston
