= Wickham =

Wickham may refer to:

== Places ==
=== Australia ===
- Wickham, New South Wales, a suburb of Newcastle
- Wickham, Northern Territory, a locality
- Wickham, Western Australia, a town
- Wickham River, an ephemeral river in the Northern Territory

=== Canada ===
- Wickham Parish, New Brunswick
  - Wickham, New Brunswick, an unincorporated community therein
- Wickham, Quebec

=== England ===
- Wickham, Berkshire
- Wickham, Hampshire
- Wickham Bishops, Essex
- Wickham Market, Suffolk
- Wickham Skeith, Suffolk
- Wickham St. Paul, Essex
- East Wickham, south-east London
- West Wickham, Cambridgeshire
- West Wickham, south-east London

=== United States ===
- Wickham, West Virginia, an unincorporated community
- Wickham, Hampshire County, West Virginia, a former unincorporated community

=== Elsewhere ===
- Wickham Island (disambiguation)

== People ==
=== Given name ===
- Wickham Skinner (1924–2019), American business theorist, professor at Harvard Business School

=== Surname ===
- Wickham (surname)

== Fictional characters ==
- Bobbie Wickham, in P. G. Wodehouse's Jeeves stories
- George Wickham, principal villain in Jane Austen's 1813 novel Pride and Prejudice
- William Wickham, a recurring character of Poldark fifth season

== Other uses ==
- Wickham A Bluebird, a home-built aircraft
- Wickhams (department store) (now closed), in London
- Wickham railway station (disambiguation)
- Wickham trolley, a railway engineering personnel carrier
- Wickham striae, a skin condition named after Louis Frédéric Wickham

== See also ==
- Wicken (disambiguation)
- Grevillea wickhamii, an Australian plant also known as Wickham's Grevillea
- Whickham, Tyne and Wear, England
- Wykeham (disambiguation)
- Wycombe
