= Upton Cressett medieval settlement =

Upton Cresset medieval settlement
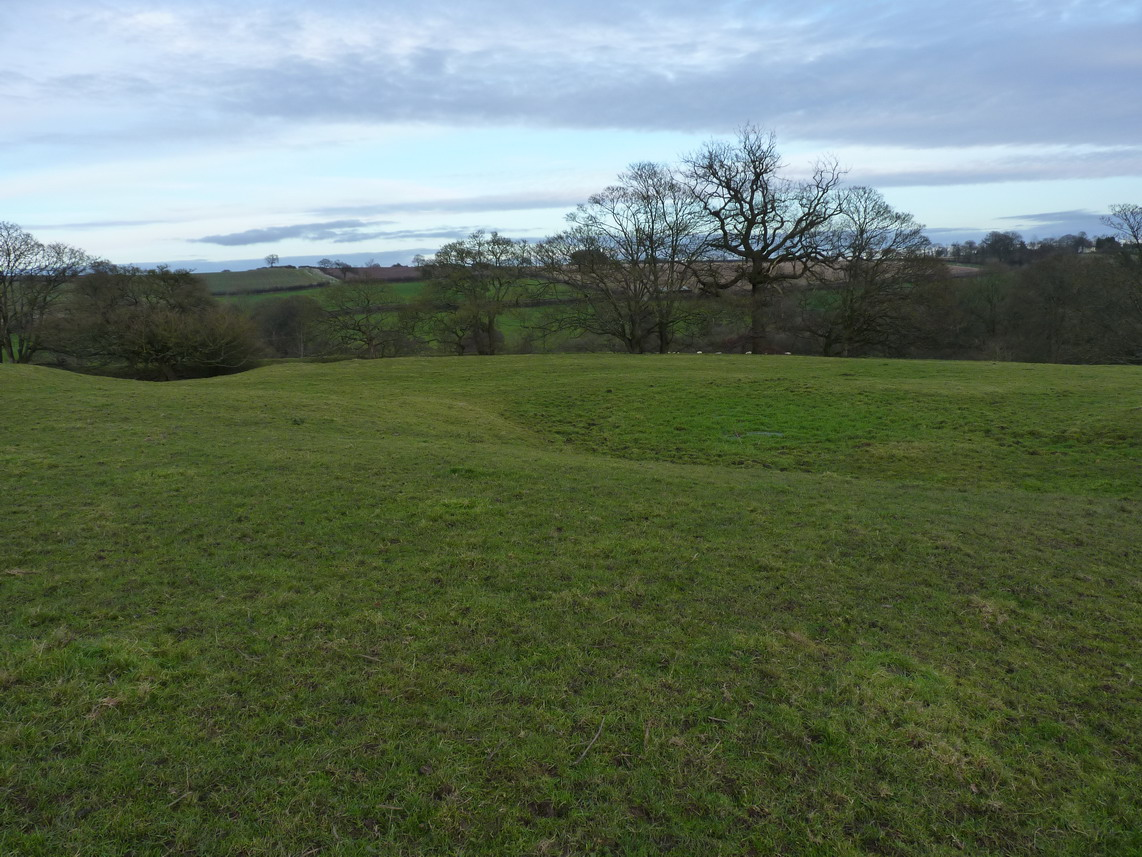
- Looking east across the site

- Location within Shropshire
- 52°31′41″N 2°30′23″W
- Location: Upton Cressett, Shropshire
- OS grid reference: SO 657 923

Site notes
- Area: 4.5 hectares (11 acres)

Scheduled monument
- Designated: 30 October 2012
- Reference no.: 1409739

Upton Cressett medieval settlement is an archaeological site, a deserted medieval village in Shropshire, England, adjacent to the village of Upton Cressett and about 3 miles (5 km) west of Bridgnorth. It is a Scheduled Monument.

== History ==
The village is mentioned, as Ultone, in the Domesday Book of 1086. In 1165 the settlement was part of the Barony of FitzAlan, and for several generations was held by the descendants of Alan de Upton. In the late 14th century the Cressetts, through marriage, succeeded to the title of Lord of Upton.

St Michael's Church and Upton Cressett Hall, both Grade I listed buildings, are adjacent to the site. The church, dating from the 12th century, is thought to be on the site of a Saxon church, from which some material may have been re-used for the later building. The hall, mostly of the 15th century, is thought to be on the site of an earlier moated house.

The desertion of the village may relate to the creation of a deer park. In 1517, in Thomas Wolsey's Inquisition of Enclosures, Upton Cressett Park is first mentioned: it was alleged that Thomas Cressett had emparked 40 acres of arable land. A 1647 map of Upton Cressett shows that the site of the settlement is within the park.

== Earthworks ==
The site, of area 4.5 hectares (11 acres), is east of the church and Hall. It is bisected by the former main street of the settlement, a substantial feature running south-east. Most of the earthworks are to the south-west of this: there are three or more house platforms alongside the street, and other linear features on this side, which were perhaps paddocks or other enclosures.

In the south-east of the site, there is a less distinct former street, at right-angles to the main street. Building platforms can be discerned alongside, including a large platform about 25 metres (82 ft) by 10 metres (33 ft), perhaps a barn.

== See also ==
- List of lost settlements in the United Kingdom
