= Adam Drummond =

Adam Drummond may refer to:

- Adam Drummond (politician) (1713–1786), Scottish merchant, banker and member of parliament
- Adam Drummond (surgeon) (1679–1758), Scottish surgeon-apothecary
- Adam Drummond, 17th Baron Strange (born 1953), English peer
