= Lacoma =

Lacoma may refer to:

- Lacoma, West Virginia, a community in Wyoming County
- Lacoma (Madrid Metro), a public transport station in Fuencarral-El Pardo
- Lacoma, Exmoor, a deserted medieval village in Devon, England
