= Wickham railway station =

Wickham railway station may refer to:

- West Wickham railway station, in London, England
- Wickham Bishops railway station, in Wickham Bishops, Essex, England
- Wickham railway station, New South Wales, former station in Newcastle, Australia (closed in 2014)
- Newcastle Interchange, station in Wickham, Newcastle, Australia (opened in 2017 to the west of the Wickham railway station mentioned above)
- Wickham railway station (Hampshire), in Wickham, Hampshire, England
- Wickham Market railway station, in Wickham Market, Suffolk, England

== See also ==
- Wycombe station, New Hope Railroad station
