= Middridge Quarry =

Site of Special Scientific Interest in County Durham, England

- Location within County Durham
- Location: MAGiC MaP
- Nearest town: Newton Aycliffe
- Coordinates: 54°37′18″N 1°37′0″W
- Area: 1.9 ha (4.7 acres)
- Established: 1979
- Governing body: Natural England
- Website: Middridge Quarry SSSI

Middridge Quarry is a Site of Special Scientific Interest in County Durham, England. It is a disused quarry, situated alongside the railway line between Newton Aycliffe and Shildon, 1 km south of the village of Middridge.

The quarry was excavated in Magnesian Limestone, the lowest level of which is an exceptionally fossiliferous marl slate which has yielded the richest and most varied Permian flora in the Britain and is the type locality for the pteridosperm Pseudoctensis middridgensis. Fossils obtained from the quarry have included several species of fish and reptiles, numerous invertebrates and plants, and the site is considered to be of international palaeontological importance.
