= Ludford, Lincolnshire =

Village and civil parish in the East Lindsey district of Lincolnshire, England

Coordinates: 53.39°N 0.20°W

Ludford
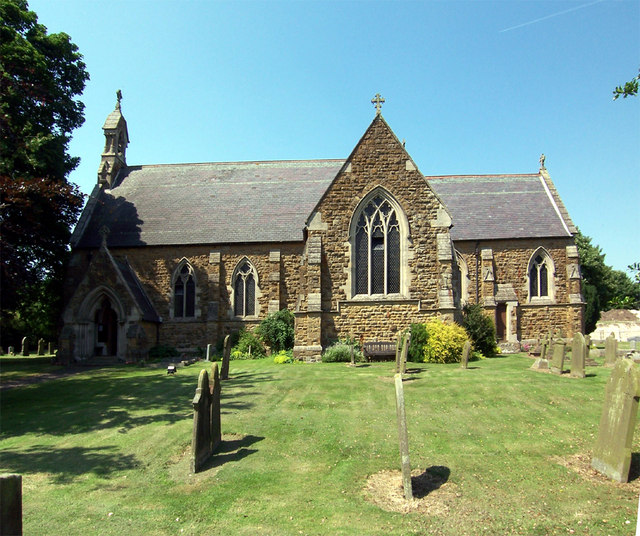
- Church of St Mary and St Peter, Ludford Magna

- Location within Lincolnshire
- Population: 460 (2011)
- OS grid reference: TF1989
  - London: 135 mi (217 km) S
- District: East Lindsey
- Shire county: Lincolnshire
- Region: East Midlands
- Country: England
- Sovereign state: United Kingdom
- Post town: Market Rasen
- Postcode district: LN8
- Dialling code: 01507
- Police: Lincolnshire
- Fire: Lincolnshire
- Ambulance: East Midlands
- UK Parliament: Louth and Horncastle

Ludford is a village and civil parish in the East Lindsey district of Lincolnshire, England. The parish is composed of the villages of Ludford Magna and Ludford Parva. In 2011 the parish had a population of 460.

== History ==
In 1885 Kelly's Directory noted the two separate settlements and parishes of Ludford Magna and Ludford Parva, both using the Church of SS Mary and Peter at Magna, a previous church at Parva showing no remains. The rebuilt church is described as containing a chancel, nave, transepts, a turret with one bell, and a south porch. A "handsome" stained glass window had been placed in the church by the inhabitants of the village in memory of a former rector. The living was combined with that of Parva, with the church register dating from 1696. Parva contained a Wesleyan and a Free Methodist chapel. A National School at Magna, built in 1853 and enlarged in 1874, held 150 children, with an average attendance of 130. The land of both parishes was described as heavy, and mixed with flint and chalk. Parish area for Magna was 2,860 acres (12 km^{2}), and that for Parva, 836 acres (3 km^{2}), chief crops grown being wheat, barley, oats and turnips. The 1881 population for Magna was 390, and for Parva, 341.

Principal landowners were Edward Heneage and Admiral Edwin Tennyson-d'Eyncourt. Magna occupations in 1885 were two farmers, a tailor, a publican at the White Hart public house, and a miller at a combined wind and steam mill. Parva occupations were three farmers, a market gardener, two shopkeepers, two saddle & harness makers, a publican at the Black Horse public house, two bricklayers, a butcher, a carrier, a blacksmith, a boot & shoe maker, a joiner & wheelwright, and a grocer & draper who also ran the post office.

Ludford primary school was built as Ludford National School, and became Ludford Church of England Primary School in 1999. The primary school was one of a few in the country to be involved with the Science and Technology through Educational Links with Amateur Radio education charity. The school was closed in 2009 because of declining pupil numbers, and after a local campaign to prevent closure was unsuccessful.

Montagu C. Allwood and his brothers, who grew up in a farming family in the village, moved south of Burgess Hill in Sussex to build a plant nursery, which is now the largest retailer of carnation plants in the world. At the time the Allwoods lived in the village, the population was twice that of now.

=== RAF Ludford Magna ===
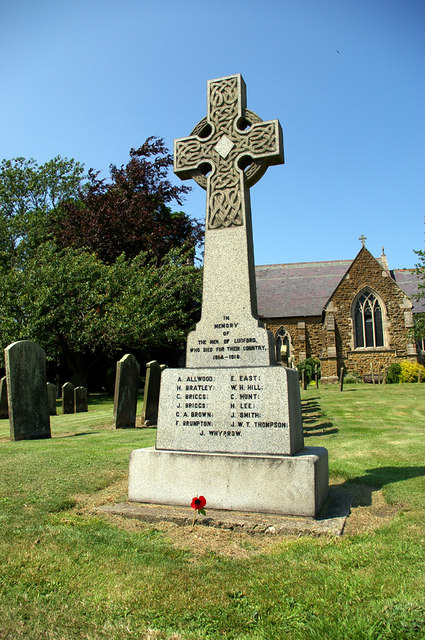
War memorial at Ludford

RAF Ludford Magna was a former Royal Air Force airfield situated south of the village, next to east side of the B1225 High Street. The station opened in June 1943.

During the Second World War, Lancaster bomber air crew from the RAF Ludford Magna were shot down and killed over Voué in France. The villagers of Voué buried the air crew and tended the graves for many years until the link with Ludford was discovered. Ludford and Voué are now twinned, with regular visits between the two. There is a memorial stone for the base in the village. The squadron suffered the greatest number of casualties of any RAF Bomber Command squadron. There is a No. 101 Squadron RAF reunion every year in early September.

During the Cold War the station was home to Thor Intermediate Range Ballistic Nuclear Missiles, each with 1.44 megaton warheads.

=== 2008 earthquake ===
On 27 February 2008 at 00.26 am Ludford was at the epicentre of an earthquake measuring 5.2 on the Richter scale. Despite the strength of the earthquake no damage was sustained to the village. To celebrate the village's place in UK earthquake history, the White Hart Inn commissioned a beer that was brewed by a local microbrewery.

== Governance ==
An electoral ward in the same name exists. This ward stretches south to Scamblesby with a total population taken at the 2011 census of 2,128.

== Geography ==
Ludford lies in East Lindsey, just outside its bordering region, West Lindsey. It sits on the 1 mile (1.6 km) long (Magna Mile) section of the east to west A631 Market Rasen to Louth road.

Ludford sits in an area of outstanding natural beauty at the northern edge of the Lincolnshire Wolds. From the B1225/A631 crossroads, to the west of the village, the parish boundary (also that of East and West Lindsey), follows the B1225 northwards, bordering North Willingham. It briefly borders Tealby along the B1225, the parish and district boundary moves from the B1225 eastwards through Kirmond Hall, bordering Kirmond le Mire. South of Walmsley Holt the boundary moves eastwards from the district boundary. It passes south of Spottle Hill Farm and Low Farm, and east of Tows Farm, at Great Tows on the road to Ludborough, it meets Calcethorpe with Kelstern. It crosses the A631 around 2 miles (3.2 km) west of the village centre. At this point it follows the start of the River Bain southwards, east of the deserted medieval villages of West Wykeham and East Wykeham, which are part of the parish. At Bain Wood, where the two tributaries of the River Bain meet, it meets Burgh on Bain. It passes north-west along the eastern edge of Wykeham Plantation, on the western edge of Wykeham Pond, and along another (western) tributary of the River Bain, south of the deserted West Wykeham. It crosses Girsby Lane to the south-west, and then south-west along the western edge of Harpgates Plantation and the eastern edge of the former RAF Ludford Magna, until it meets the B1225 and Hainton. A mile north along the B1225 it meets Sixhills and West Lindsey. West of Gally Hill Farm it meets North Willingham.

== Community ==
The Ludford Village Hall Committee produces the newsletter The Magna Messenger.

The parish church, in Ludford Magna, is dedicated to St Peter and St Mary (in some sources St Peter with St Mary) and is grade II listed. It has the 101 Squadron Roll of Honour, and one grave in the care of the Commonwealth War Graves Commission. The village public house, on the A631, is the White Hart Inn.

The nearest regular bus service is at Burgh on Bain, although the Callconnect network provides a pre-booked bus service for the village, with links to the market towns of Louth and Market Rasen.
