= Listed buildings in Upton Cressett =

Upton Cressett is a civil parish in Shropshire, England. In the parish are six listed buildings that are recorded in the National Heritage List for England. Of these, three are listed at Grade I, the highest of the three grades, and the others are at Grade II, the lowest grade. The parish focuses on the settlement of Upton Cressett, which contains three buildings that are listed at Grade I, namely, a church, a country house, and its gatehouse. The rest of the parish is entirely rural and the listed buildings here consist of two houses and a farmhouse.

== Key ==
Grade	Criteria
I	Buildings of exceptional interest, sometimes considered to be internationally important
II	Buildings of national importance and special interest

== Buildings ==
Name and location	Photograph	Date	Notes	Grade
St Michael's Church; 52.52893°N 2.50851°W		12th century	In the 13th century a north aisle was added, but later demolished, the chancel chapel was built in the 14th century, and the timber framed south porch was added later. The church is built in sandstone with a tile roof, and consists of a nave, a south porch, and a chancel with a south chapel. Towards the west end of the nave is a bellcote with weatherboarding and a small lead-clad spire. The church contains Norman features including windows, the south doorway and internal arches. It is now redundant.	I
Upton Cressett Hall; 52.52844°N 2.50870°W		Mid 15th century	A country house on a moated site that originated as a timber framed hall. It was extended in 1480, remodelled and encased in brick in 1580, extended in the 17th century, and later restored. The house has a tile roof, two storeys with attic and a half-basement, and an L-shaped plan, with the original hall range having two bays, a cross-wing of six bays, and a stair block at the junction. The windows are mix of different types, and there are two massive chimney stacks.	I
Gatehouse, Upton Cressett Hall; 52.52813°N 2.50838°W	—	c.1580	The gatehouse is in brick on a plinth, with some diapering and some rendered dressings. It has two storeys and an attic, a rectangular plan and three bays. The windows are mullioned or mullioned and transomed with moulded surrounds. In the middle is an archway with a four-centred head. On the south front the archway is flanked by chimneys with a gabled dormer between. In the upper floor and attic are windows. The north front, facing the house, has a central gable, corner octagonal turrets, and also contains windows. On the tops of the turrets are conical roofs with ball finials.	I
Stapeley Farm House; 52.53060°N 2.53378°W	—	17th century (probable)	The farmhouse is in stone and has a tile roof. There are two storeys and the windows are casements.	II
Upton Park; 52.52182°N 2.52039°W	—	Early 18th century	A red brick house with dentilled eaves, and a tile roof with stone coped end gables. There are two storeys and three bays. On the front is a gabled porch and a doorway with a moulded surround and a rectangular fanlight, and the windows are mullioned sashes with channelled lintels.	II
Upper House; 52.53218°N 2.50708°W	—	Early 19th century	The house is in stone and brick, and has moulded eaves and a tile roof. There are two storeys and three bays. The windows and doorway are in Gothick style, and the central doorway has a pediment with a quatrefoil.	II
