= Adam Drummond (surgeon) =

Scottish surgeon-apothecary

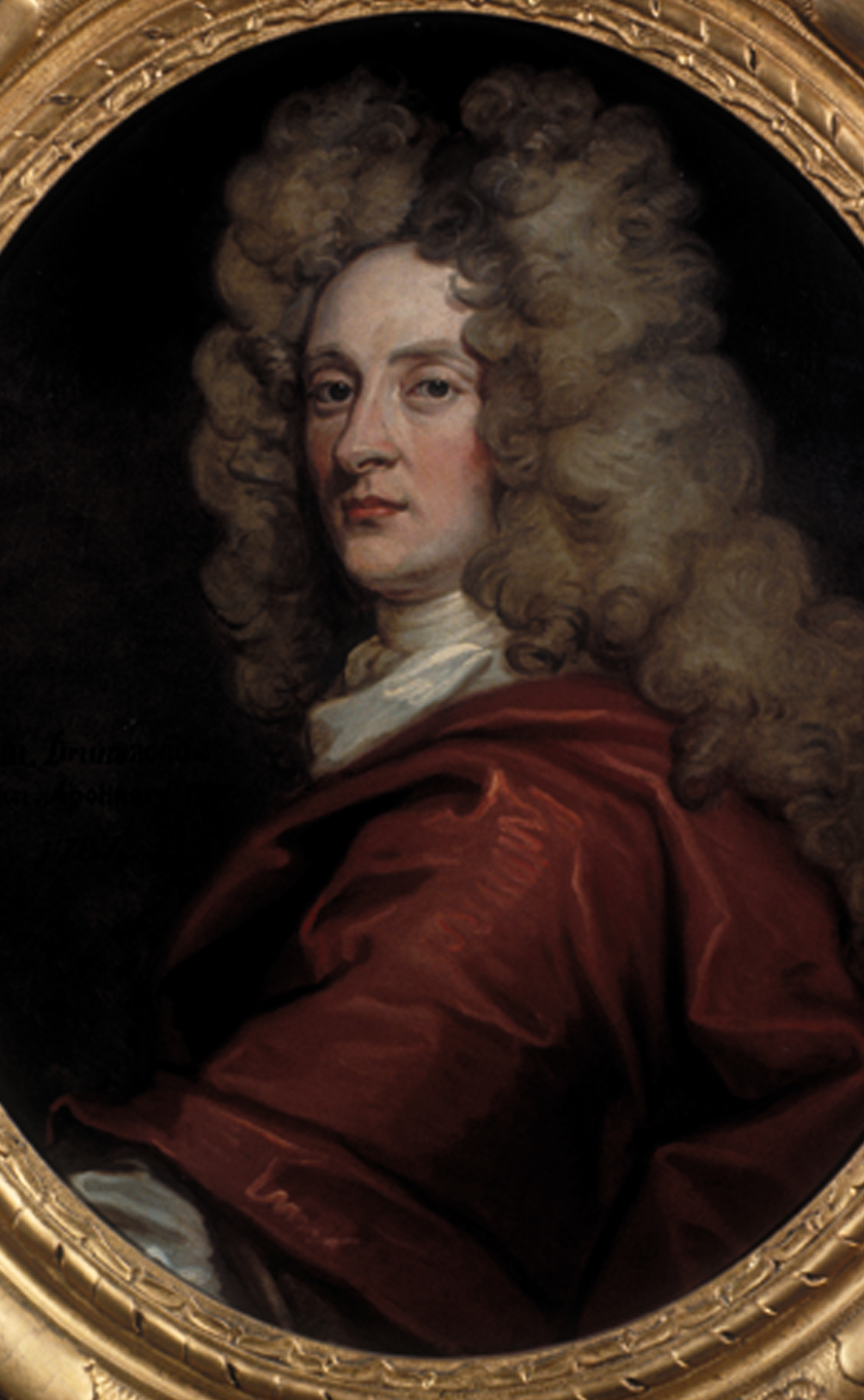
Portrait of Adam Drummond by Sir John Medina

Adam Drummond of Binend (1679–1758) was a Scottish surgeon-apothecary who was appointed, jointly, as the first Professor of Anatomy at the University of Edinburgh.

== Early life ==
He was the third son of Adam Drummond (1649-1709) of Megginch, 9th of Lennoch, a Commissioner to the Scottish Parliament and a Privy Councillor of Scotland. His father, a prominent Scottish lawyer and politician, was appointed in 1692 as one of the commissioners into the enquiry into the massacre of Glencoe. His elder brother John Drummond 10th of Lennoch and 3rd of Megginch was Member of Parliament for Perthshire. Adam Drummond was born on the family estate at Megginch in Perthshire and went to the local school in Errol before matriculating at St. Andrews University at the age of sixteen. Three years later he became surgical apprentice to Thomas Edgar who had been Deacon of the Incorporation of Surgeons of Edinburgh from 1685 to 1687. On completion of his apprenticeship he went, as was the custom of the day, for further education at a continental University. En route to the continent he took a course of anatomy in London from a fellow Scot Dr Robert Erskine of Alva, before further studies at the University of Leyden.

== Surgical career ==
On his return to Edinburgh, Drummond was admitted to the Incorporation of Surgeons in 1707 and established a practice as a surgeon-apothecary in the Lawnmarket in Edinburgh. He was appointed as the joint Professor of Anatomy to the Town’s College (which became the University of Edinburgh in 1708) to join Robert Eliot, who had been appointed in 1705, was the first to hold that post and was the first Professor of Anatomy in Britain. In 1720 Drummond resigned "owing to the state of his health and his business", although it is likely that this was as a result of pressure from John Monro, who wished to advance the interests of his son Alexander. One week later the University appointed Alexander Monro primus as his successor, paving the way for the famous dynasty of Anatomy professors.

Drummond’s practice as a surgeon-apothecary flourished and he dispensed remedies prescribed by the most eminent physicians of the day. This successful practice attracted many apprentices.

Drummond had been librarian to the Incorporation of Surgeons from 1746 and was Deacon (President) of the Incorporation between 1748 and 1750.

== Political allegiance ==
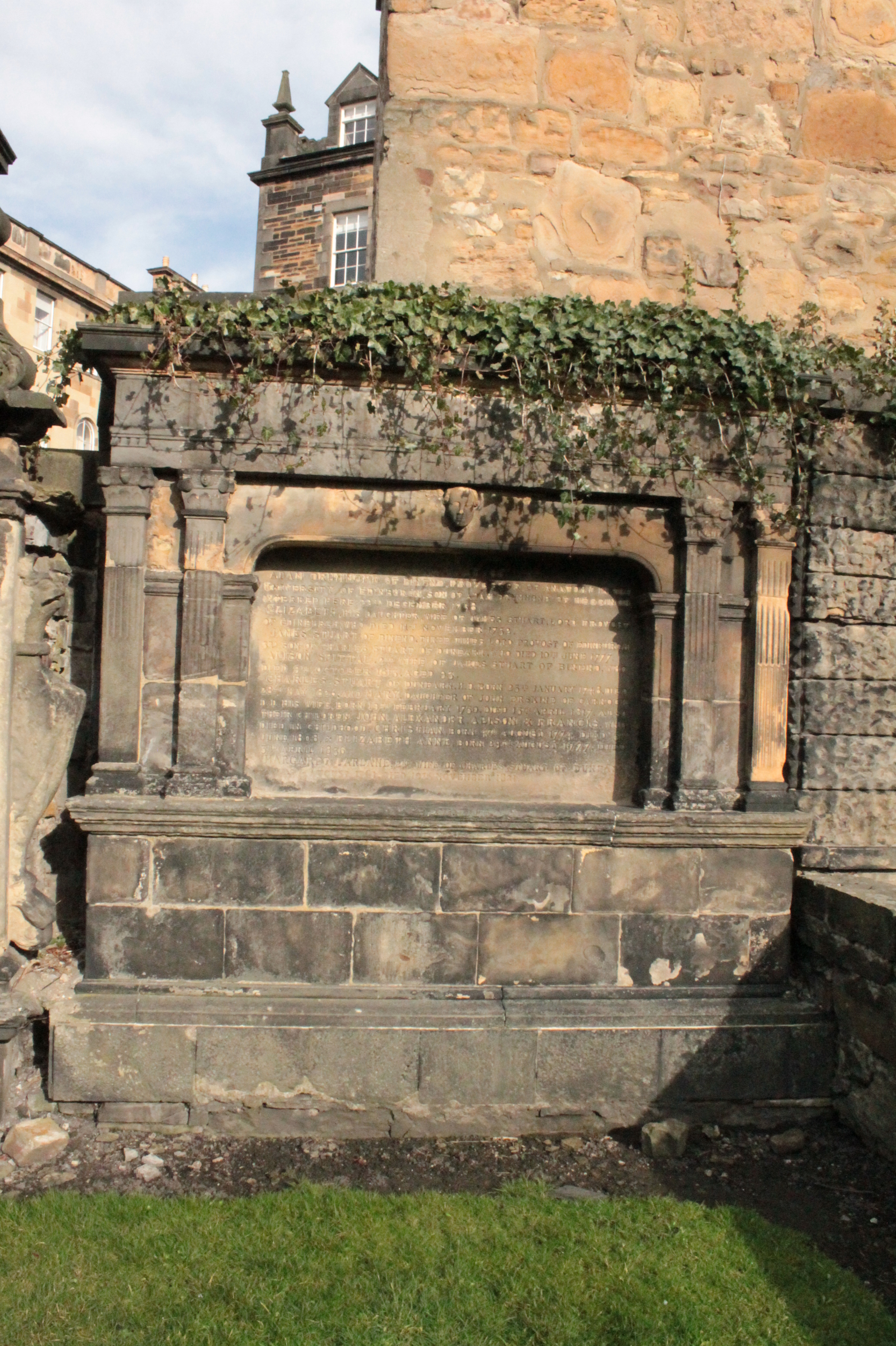
The grave of Adam Drummond of Binend, Greyfriars Kirkyard

In the 1745 Jacobite uprising the Jacobite army under Prince Charles Edwart Stuart defeated a Government army under the command of General Sir John Cope at the Battle of Prestonpans. Among the surgeons from Edinburgh who came to attend the wounded was Colin Simpson, one of Drummond’s apprentices, whose loyalty to the Government was such that he was entrusted to secretly deliver 400 guineas to Drummond’s nephew, Captain Adam Drummond, paymaster to the 47th Regiment of Foot, who had been captured after Prestonpans and was being held prisoner at Queensberry House in Edinburgh.

== Family and death ==
He married Margaret Spittall in 1710. Their daughter Elizabeth married James Stuart who served three terms of office as Lord Provost of Edinburgh. Margaret was an ancestor of Sir James Spittal, Lord Provost in the 19th century.

Drummond bought a house and estate at Binend near Burntisland in Fife. Later known as Binnend the estate lies near Burntisland but its associated village went into decline from the 1890s and was fully abandoned in 1954.

He died in November 1758 and was buried in Greyfriars Kirkyard, Edinburgh.
