= Coates medieval settlement =

Deserted medieval village in Lincolnshire, England

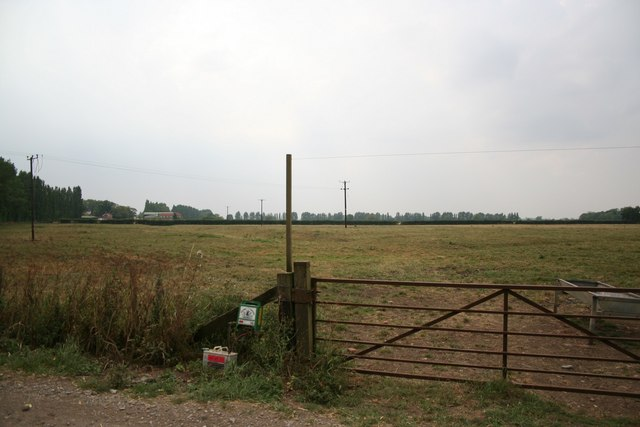
- The site of the village, in a field north of the road near Grange Farm

- Location within Lincolnshire
- 53°20′23″N 0°37′58″W
- Location: Lincolnshire
- OS grid reference: SK 911 834

Scheduled monument
- Designated: 24 November 1999
- Reference no.: 1016979

Coates medieval settlement, also known as Coates-by-Stow, is a deserted medieval village in the civil parish of Stow, in the West Lindsey district, in the county of Lincolnshire, England. It is about 2 miles (3.2 km) east of the village of Stow. It is a Scheduled Monument. Today there is just a farm with a farmyard and a church standing nearby.

== History ==
The village of Coates was recorded in the Domesday Book of 1086, having then six households. In the late 12th century, the church and land of the village were given to Welbeck Abbey in Nottinghamshire. The population of the village had increased by the early 14th century, but later in the century was reduced by the Black Death, and did not recover.

Today at Coates-by-Stow there are two farms, a hall, several cottages and the Grade I listed Church of St Edith.

=== Church of St Edith ===
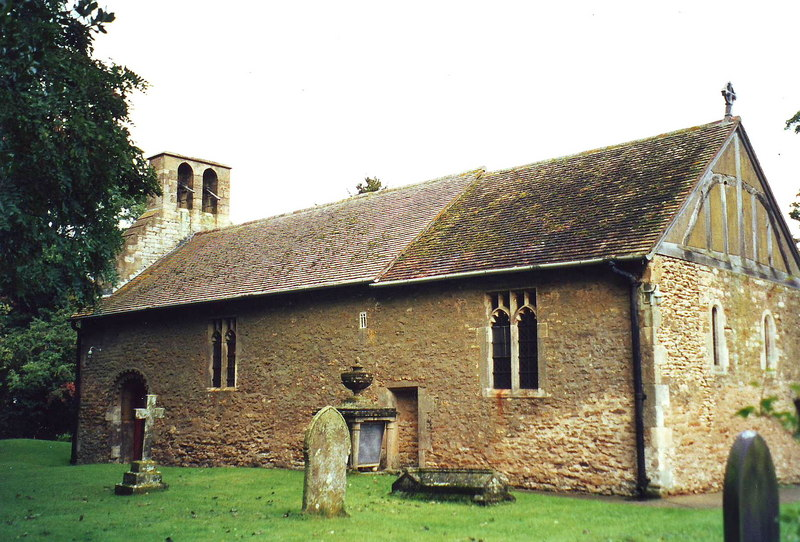
Church of St Edith, Coates-by-Stow: The double bellcote is visible in upper-left of image

The church, likely a Saxon foundation, is dedicated to St Edith of Polesworth. Much of the surviving architecture is late Norman, 12th-century, but it has alterations and additions up to Georgian period, including a double bellcote. The church has a low and small nave and chancel. It contains a 15th-century rood screen, the only one in Lincolnshire. There is a Jacobean family pew at the west end, and the rest of the seating is just rough benches sometimes described as "rustic". There is the royal coat of arms of Charles I dating from 1635 and monumental brasses to a William Butler (died 1590) and his wife; the figures on these are small. In a niche there is a demi-figure made of alabaster of a Brian Cooke who died in 1653. There are remnants of 15th-century (c. 1470–1500) and 1597 stained glass in situ. Outside, just south of the chancel, is the tomb of the Maltby family comprising an urn on a table with tapering columns as legs, with a sarcophagus underneath.

== Earthworks ==
Medieval ridge and furrow cultivation is discernable in the field immediately west of Grange Farm. In the adjoining field to the west are the earthworks of the village. There is a west–east roadway, shown by a ditch of length 430 metres (1,410 ft) and about 0.7 metres (2 ft 4 in) deep; on both sides of this are rectangular ditched enclosures, where houses and outbuildings once stood. North of the northern range of buildings are indications of large rectangular enclosures, thought to have been medieval paddocks; inside these can be seen the ridge and furrow pattern of earlier cultivation in that area.

Further to the west, at grid reference SK 908 831, there is an L-shaped water-filled depression about 30 metres (98 ft) west of the church, evidently the remaining part of a moat. It is thought that there was a group of buildings within the moat, extending over an area where Coates Hall and Hall Farm now stand. The site may have been a grange of Welbeck Abbey, established in the late 12th century, of which only the church, whose oldest parts date from that time, survives.

== See also ==
- List of lost settlements in the United Kingdom
