= Upton Cressett =

Village in Shropshire, England

Coordinates: 52.528°N 2.508°W

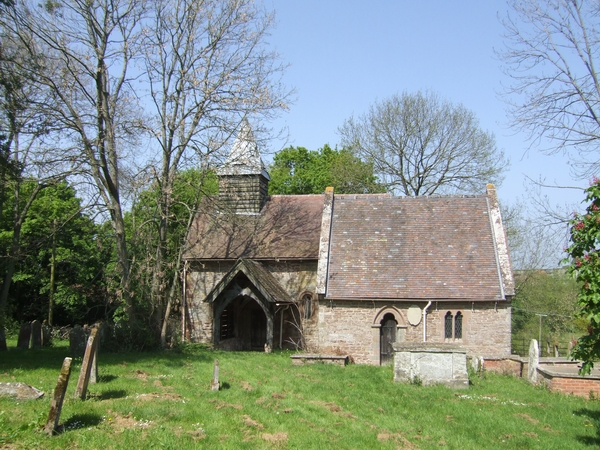
- St Michael's church

- Location within Shropshire
- OS grid reference: SO655923
- Civil parish: Upton Cressett
- Unitary authority: Shropshire
- Ceremonial county: Shropshire
- Region: West Midlands
- Country: England
- Sovereign state: United Kingdom
- Post town: BRIDGNORTH
- Postcode district: WV16
- Dialling code: 01746
- Police: West Mercia
- Fire: Shropshire
- Ambulance: West Midlands
- UK Parliament: Ludlow

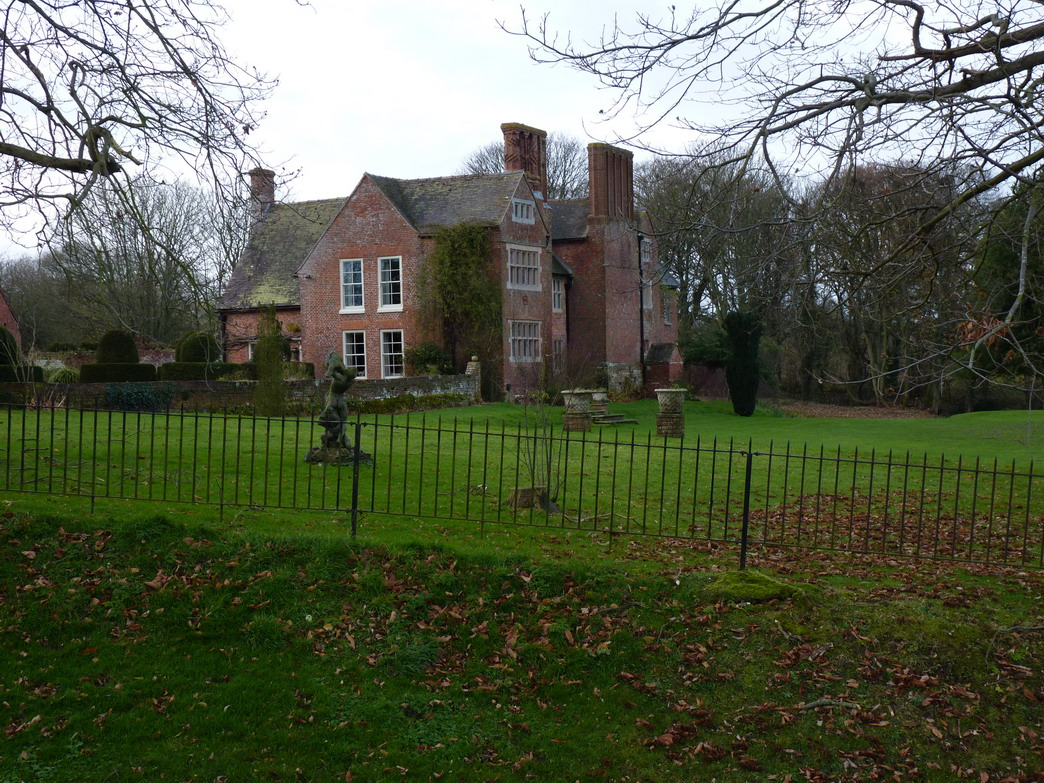
Upton Cressett Hall

Upton Cressett is a village and civil parish in the English county of Shropshire. Population details for the 2011 census are shown under Aston Eyre parish.

The village is notable as the location of three Grade I listed buildings, St Michael's church Upton Cressett Hall and the Gatehouse of the Hall.

St Michael's church is now redundant and in the care of the Churches Conservation Trust. The Gatehouse of the hall has been renovated as a luxury country house hotel.

Near to the church and hall is the site of an abandoned medieval settlement.

== See also ==
- Listed buildings in Upton Cressett
