= Voué =

Commune in Grand Est, France

- Commune
- Location of Voué
- Location within France Location within Grand Est
- Coordinates: 48°27′25″N 4°07′24″E
- Country: France
- Region: Grand Est
- Department: Aube
- Arrondissement: Troyes
- Canton: Arcis-sur-Aube
- Intercommunality: Arcis, Mailly, Ramerupt

Government
  - Mayor (2020–2026): Alain Steinmann
- Area^{1}: 13.25 km^{2} (5.12 sq mi)
- Elevation: 121 m (397 ft)
- Highest elevation: 181 m (594 ft)
- Lowest elevation: 105 m (344 ft)
- Population (2023): 689
  - Density: 52.0/km^{2} (135/sq mi)
- Time zone: UTC+01:00 (CET)
  - Summer (DST): UTC+02:00 (CEST)
- INSEE/Postal code: 10442 /10150
- ^{1} French Land Register data, which excludes lakes, ponds, glaciers > 1 km^{2} (0.386 sq mi or 247 acres) and river estuaries.

Voué (French pronunciation: [vwe]) is a commune in the Aube department in north-central France.

== Population ==
Historical population
Year	Pop.	±% p.a.
1968	314	—
1975	280	−1.62%
1982	373	+4.18%
1990	383	+0.33%
1999	428	+1.24%
2007	535	+2.83%
2012	621	+3.03%
2017	681	+1.86%
2023	689	+0.19%
Source: INSEE

== See also ==
- Communes of the Aube department
- Ludford, Lincolnshire
