= Wycombe =

Wycombe may refer to the following places:

== Australia ==
- Wycombe, Queensland, a locality in the Maranoa Region
- High Wycombe, Western Australia, a suburb of Perth

== United Kingdom ==
- High Wycombe, Buckinghamshire, England
  - Wycombe District, a local government district
  - Wycombe Rural District, a former local government district
  - Wycombe (UK Parliament constituency)

== United States ==
- Wycombe, Pennsylvania, a village in Wrightstown Township, United States

== See also ==
- Wickham (disambiguation)
- Wykeham (disambiguation)
- Wycomb, Leicestershire, England
