= Riseburn =

Village in County Durham, England

Coordinates: 54°37′06″N 1°36′48″W

Riseburn was a short-lived village in County Durham, situated south of Middridge and close to Eden Pit. It consisted of three terraces and a Primitive Methodist Chapel.

Riseburn was built in the late nineteenth century, but only survived until the 1940s.

Today, little if any trace remains of Riseburn.
