= Wycombe station =

Railway station in Pennsylvania, 1891–1952

Coordinates: 40°16′56″N 75°01′10″W

Wycombe
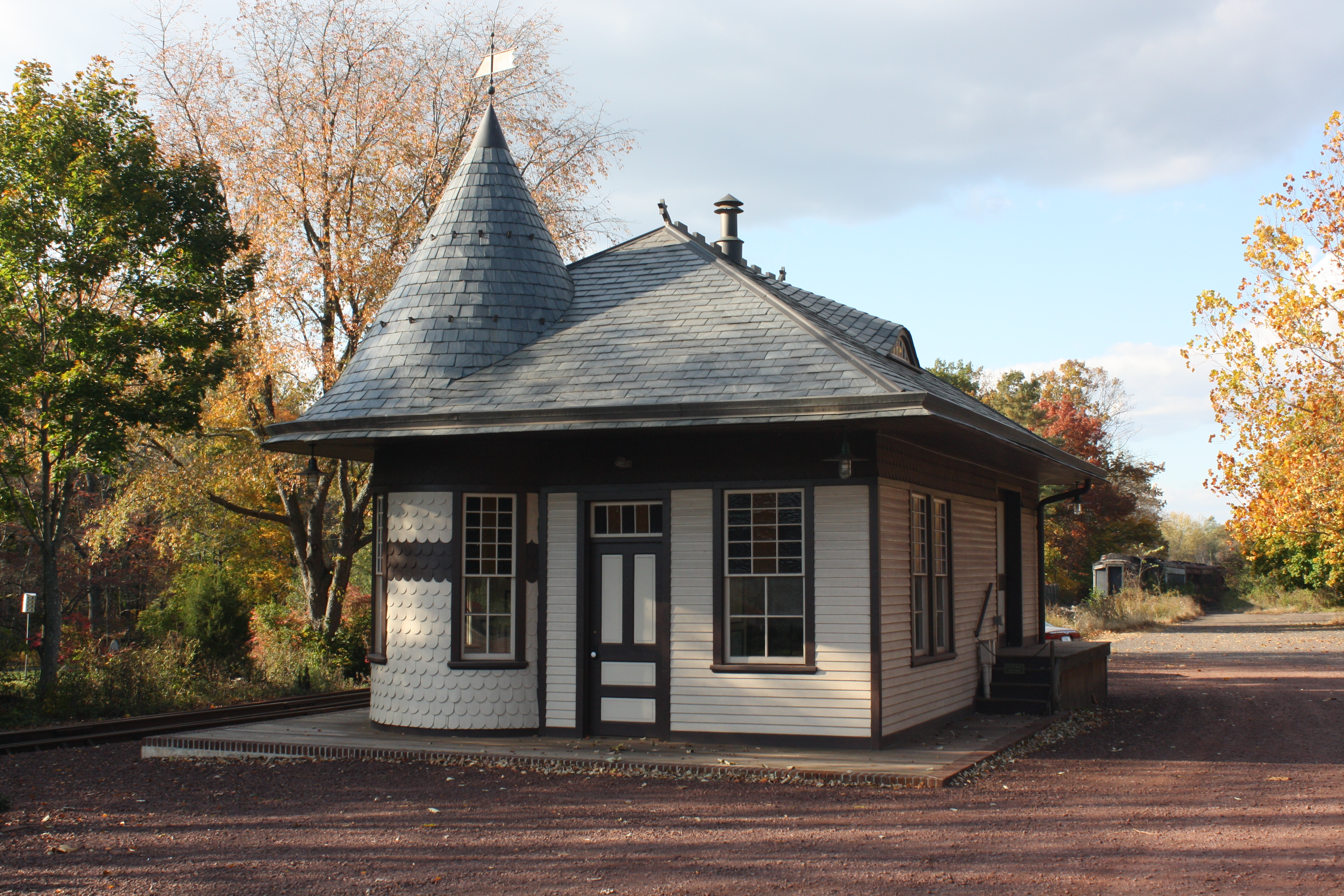
- Wycombe station

General information
- Location: 4188 Township Line Road, Buckingham Township, Bucks County, Pennsylvania
- System: New Hope Railroad heritage station
- Platforms: 1

Construction
- Structure type: Depot

Other information
- Station code: WN

History
- Opened: March 21, 1891
- Closed: June 7, 1952

Services
Preceding station	New Hope Railroad	Following station
Rushland toward Warminster	Main Line	Buckingham Valley toward New Hope
Former services
Preceding station	Reading Railroad	Following station
Rushland toward Philadelphia	New Hope Branch	Montessori School toward New Hope
Location

Wycombe is a defunct station on the Reading Company's New Hope Branch. The station is currently on the line used by the New Hope Railroad.

== History ==
Service to the Wycombe station started 1891 and ended 1952. The station was restored in 2009 by the county, as it was sold off in the 1990s. The railroad leases the station during private events such as photo charters, or when passenger service requires its use. For example, the station sees use during the railroad's "Fall Foliage" trains. Passenger trains usually do not go south of Wycombe, as everything south between Wycombe and Warminster is freight only. Originally, the station was called "Lingohocken".
