= Houghton, Cambridgeshire (medieval village) =

Houghton is a deserted medieval village located one mile to the west of present-day Brampton, Cambridgeshire. Unlike many such villages which became deserted following the black death, Houghton was abandoned earlier when Henry II declared the county of Huntingdonshire a royal forest, forcing the villagers to move elsewhere to obtain food and fuel. The village was discovered during work to upgrade the A14 road which commenced in 2016.

Houghton began as an unenclosed Anglo-Saxon settlement in the sixth century, eventually by the ninth century consisting of around forty houses and other buildings. By the early Norman period the village was centred to the north of the Anglo-Saxon site with more formalised plots and trackways.
