= Middridge =

Village in County Durham, England

Coordinates: 54.630°N 1.612°W

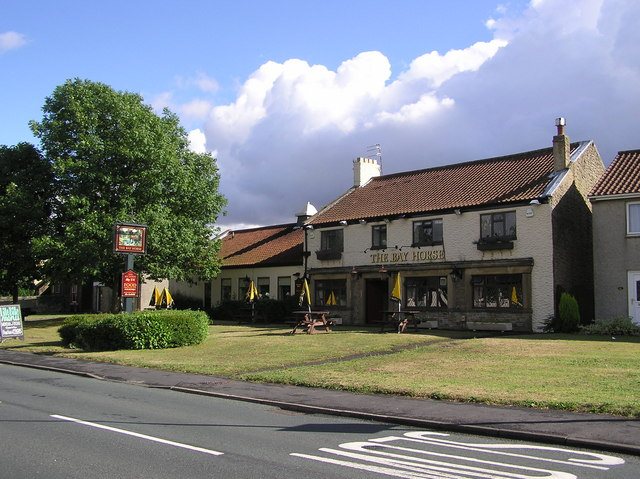
- The Bay Horse

- Location within County Durham
- Population: 312 (2011)
- OS grid reference: NZ251261
- Unitary authority: County Durham
- Ceremonial county: Durham
- Region: North East
- Country: England
- Sovereign state: United Kingdom
- Post town: Newton Aycliffe
- Postcode district: DL5
- Dialling code: 01325
- Police: Durham
- Fire: County Durham and Darlington
- Ambulance: North East

Middridge is a village and civil parish in County Durham, England. It is situated east of Shildon and north-west of Newton Aycliffe. The village is situated near a quarry that was mined by the people many generations ago. There is one public house in the village: the Bay Horse. In 2011 the parish had a population of 312.

== History ==
Following the fall of the Roman Empire, the Angles arrived in the area around 500 AD and created several settlements, including Middridge. The name "Middridge" is derived from its location at that time on the "middle ridge" between Eldon and School Aycliffe (near the current Aycliffe golf course).

Anglo-Saxon Middridge lasted for five hundred years before being destroyed by the Normans during William the Conqueror's Harrying of the North. Those who survived this massacre (and the resulting disease and starvation) were enslaved by the invaders. They were forced by the Bishop of Durham to toil in the surrounding fields as serfs, and forcibly relocated to gloomy huts centred on the village green. The "serfs" eventually gained their freedom and the village green survives to this day, although the housing has improved considerably.

The arrival of the industrial age in the nineteenth century resulted in two coal mines: Charles Pit and Eden Pit. These pits were collectively known as Middridge Colliery, and provided employment for hundreds of people in their heyday while producing a combined daily total of 600 tons of coal, before closing in the early 20th century. The remains of this era live on in the names of places such as Charles Row, Eden Grove and the "pit heap", a small hill used in the winter as a sledge run. Until recently, the pit heap was also used to host the annual village bonfire.

== Notable buildings, structures and features ==
Middridge Grange is a Grade II listed building situated just outside the village itself, between Shildon and School Aycliffe. It is one of the oldest buildings in the region, beginning life as a large Elizabethan manor in 1578. However, the current Middridge Grange bears little resemblance to the original manor, much of which was destroyed by fire in the 19th century.

Used as a farmhouse, it has been owned by the Scott family since the early 20th century but has not been lived in since the 1970s, after falling into serious disrepair. A site of great interest to historians, it is currently undergoing an extensive renovation.

Middridge Village Hall was originally built as a school for the children of the village and local farming community. It served this purpose for many years, but due to a continuing fall in pupil numbers in the 1950s and 1960s and changes in education policy, it closed.

To prevent the building becoming derelict, the committee of the village association took over the administration of the hall. After various repairs and alterations, it became the village hall, which it has been for well over thirty years. The village hall is used as a venue for discos, church services, parties and social gatherings such as the monthly wine club. The hall has recently been refurbished, with an entirely new roof section, plumbing structure and electrical system.

Middridge Quarry is a site of special scientific interest.

== Notable residents ==
The Byerley Turk, the great stallion owned by the then Captain (later Colonel) Robert Byerley, was arguably Middridge's most famous resident. The Byerley Turk was one of the three founding stallions of today's thoroughbred horses and was stood at Middridge Grange, until being moved to Goldsborough Hall, near Knaresborough, North Yorkshire, when his owner married his cousin, Mary Wharton, in 1692.

Robert Byerley was the son of Colonel Anthony Byerley, a cavalry officer who served Charles I in a unit known as "Byerley's Bulldogs". The Byerley line eventually died out, but their name lives on in place names around the region, such as Byerley Park and Byerley Road.

It is believed that King Charles I of England took refuge in Middridge Grange during the English Civil War.

John Marley (geologist) was born at Middridge Grange in 1823. He made the commercial discovery of Cleveland ironstone which led to the industrial growth of Middlesbrough.

== Legends and folklore ==
The Middridge fairies (or faeries) are, according to legend, very different from the kind, winged fairies of popular culture. They are rumoured to be evil demons that scourge people and generally cause mischief. The story goes that the fairies chased a traveller, who took refuge in Middridge Grange, getting inside the building just before the pitchfork struck the door. The pitchfork mark was reputedly on this door for many years afterwards. They were also blamed for disruptions to the building of the Stockton and Darlington railway.

== The village fete ==
Middridge village fete is a yearly event for the local community, also attended by people in neighbouring regions. It is usually a combination of a jumble sale, children's entertainment, competitions and other events, usually ending in a barbecue that is eaten with copious amounts of alcohol.

== Archeology ==
In 1974, during excavations for the foundation of the Bay Horse Pub extension, a hoard of coins mainly dating from Edward 1 era was found. Known as "The Middridge Hoard", the significant hoard was mainly distributed at an auction by Dinning in 1976, although some remain in the Dorman Museum in Middlesbrough, and the British Treasury Museum in London. The hoard of 3072 coins was estimated to be buried in 1311, and consisted of mainly English, but also Irish, Scottish and Continental coins.
