= Hillway =

Coordinates: 50.678255°N 1.107358°W

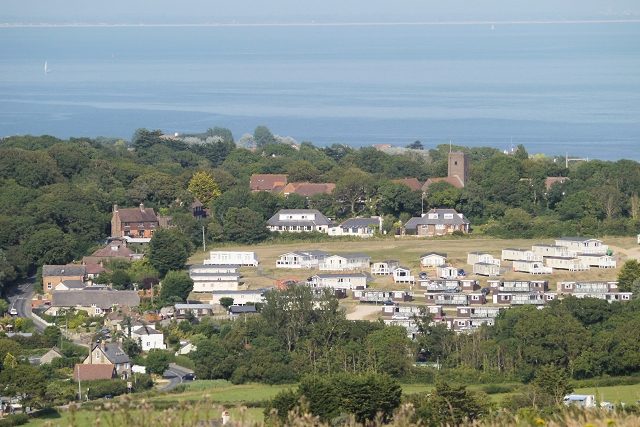
- Hillway

- Location within the Isle of Wight
- OS grid reference: SZ633868
- Unitary authority: Isle of Wight
- Ceremonial county: Isle of Wight
- Region: South East
- Country: England
- Sovereign state: United Kingdom
- Post town: BEMBRIDGE
- Postcode district: PO35
- Dialling code: 01983
- Police: Hampshire and Isle of Wight
- Fire: Hampshire and Isle of Wight
- Ambulance: Isle of Wight
- UK Parliament: Isle of Wight East

Hillway is a settlement on the Isle of Wight, off the south coast of England.

The hamlet lies near to the south-east coast of the island, and is located near to the larger settlement of Bembridge (where the 2011 Census population is included). Hillway is the location of the Britten-Norman aircraft factory and Bembridge Airport, and is approximately 8.5 miles (13.7 km) south-east of Newport.
