= Sandford, Isle of Wight =

Hamlet on the Isle of Wight, England

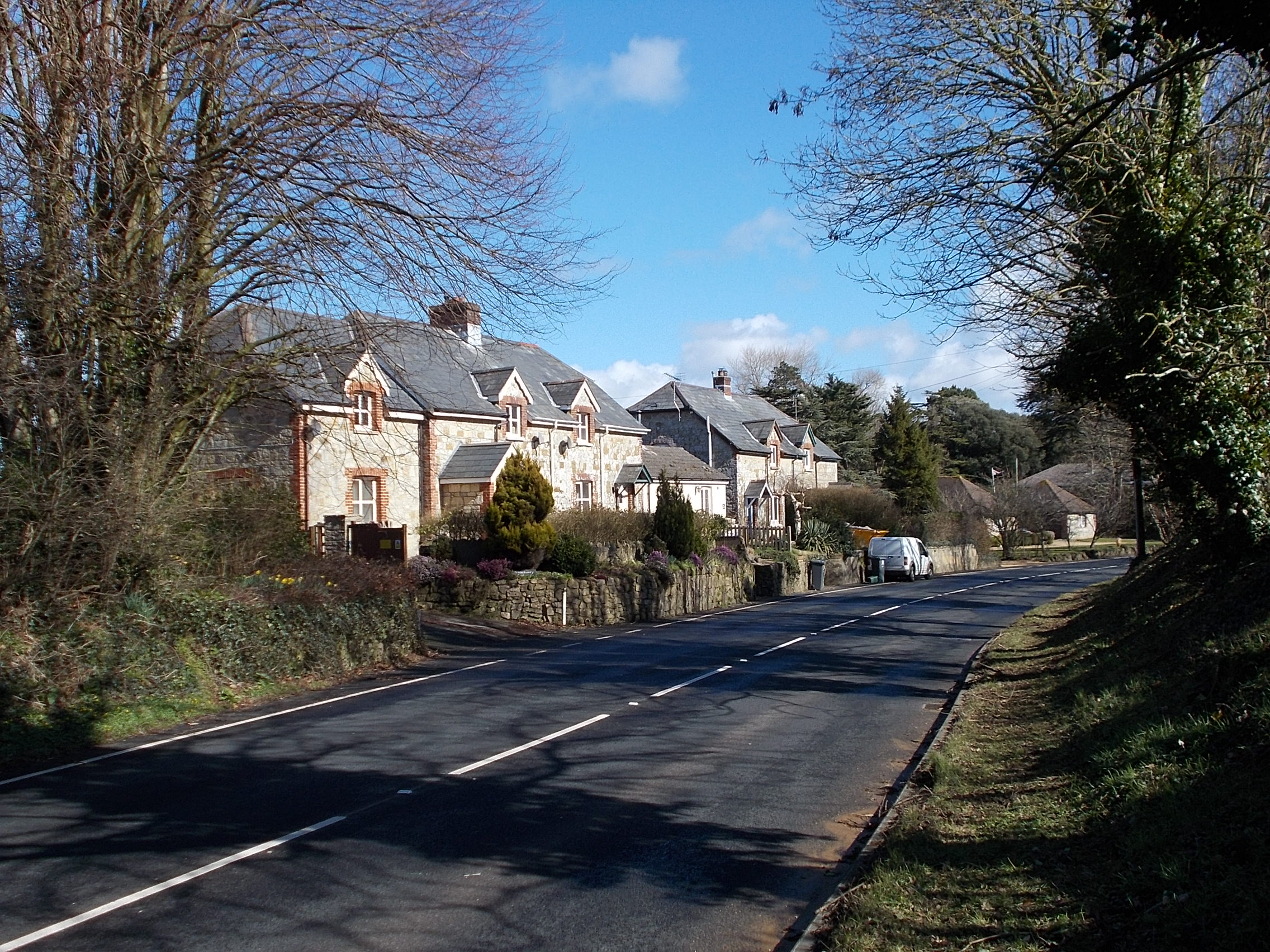
Sandford

Sandford is a hamlet on the Isle of Wight. Sandford is on the outskirts of Godshill (where the 2011 population was listed) in the southeast part of the island. Sandford has a latitude of 50°37′48.23″N 1°13′45.63″W. Sandford is located on the A 3020 road and public transport is provided by bus route 2 and 3, run by Southern Vectis.

Sandford hosts several businesses, including some farms and a boarding cattery. A Primitive Methodist Chapel is in Sandford.

Sandford has an entry in the Domesday Book of 1086. There were two mills in Sandford. Sandford was the site of brickmaking operations in the past.

== Name ==
The name means 'the sandy ford', from Old English sand and ford. The spelling has remained almost unchanged for over 900 years.

1086 (Domesday Book): Sanford

1279: Saunford

15th century: Sanforde

1552: Sandford
