= Wickham Island =

Wickham Island may refer to a number of places named after John Clements Wickham:

== Australia ==
Two islands in Western Australia:

- Wickham Island (Kimberley coast), an island in the Timor Sea
- Wickham Island (Recherche Archipelago), an island off the south coast of WA

== Chile ==
- Wickham Island (Chile)

== Solomon Islands ==
- an island in the New Georgia Islands group
