= Akethorpe =

Coordinates: 52.492°N 1.731°E

Akethorpe, or Akethorp, was an English village thought to have been located in what is now part of the Suffolk town of Lowestoft. The village was described in the Domesday Book as being home to four households in the Hundred of Lothingland. It formed part of the King's holding in 1086, having been held by Aelmer the Priest in 1066.

The manor of Akethorp was purchased by Magdalen College, Oxford in 1478. Earthworks thought to be part of the manorial boundary have been surveyed in the area. A road in modern Lowestoft is named Akethorpe Way.

== See also ==
- Abandoned village
