= St Michael's Church, Upton Cressett =

Coordinates: 52.5289°N 2.5085°W

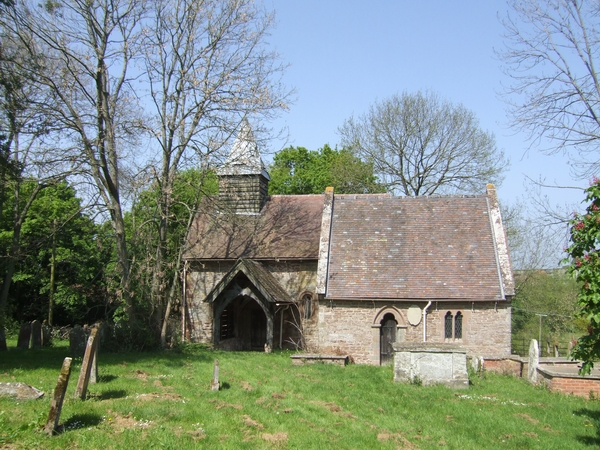
- St Michael's Church, Upton Cressett, from the south

- Location in Shropshire
- Location: Near Bridgnorth, Shropshire
- Country: England
- Denomination: Anglican
- Website: Churches Conservation Trust

History
- Dedication: Saint Michael

Architecture
- Functional status: Redundant
- Heritage designation: Grade I
- Designated: 30 Oct 2012
- Architectural type: Church
- Style: Norman
- Groundbreaking: 12th century

Specifications
- Materials: Stone, tile roofs

St Michael's Church, Upton Cressett, is a redundant Anglican church. It stands on a remote hillside adjacent to Upton Cressett Hall, some 5 km west of the town of Bridgnorth, Shropshire, England (grid reference SO655924). It is recorded in the National Heritage List for England as a designated Grade I listed building, and is under the care of the Churches Conservation Trust.

== History ==
The church originates from the 12th century. A north aisle was added in the 13th century, but this has since been demolished. A chapel was built on the south side of the chancel, probably in the 14th century. In the late medieval era a south porch was added. The church was declared redundant on 2 October 1970, and was vested in the Churches Conservation Trust on 1 March 1972.

== Architecture ==
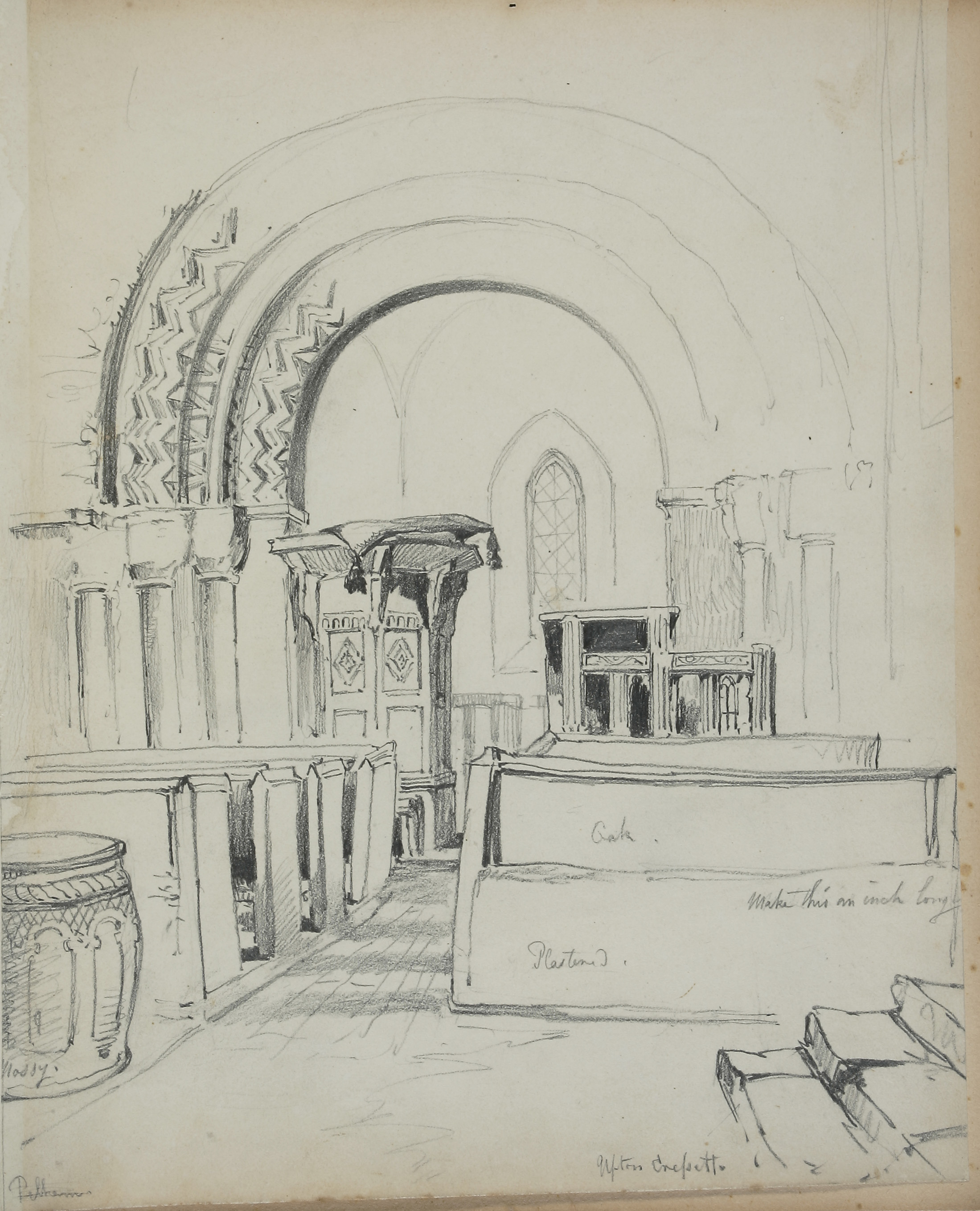
Interior in 1832, by Henry Harris Lines

St Michael's is a small and simple church containing Norman architecture. The body of the church is constructed in stone with tiled roofs, and the south porch is timber framed. Its plan consists of a nave with a south porch, and a chancel with a south chapel. Towards the west end of the nave roof is a weatherboarded bellcote with a short spire covered in lead. The Norman architecture includes some of the windows, the south doorway, the arcade of the demolished north aisle, and the chancel arch. The south doorway has two orders of shafts, and two orders decorated with chevrons on its arch. The arcade is visible from the outside of the church and is in two bays. The chancel arch is described by the architectural historians John Newman and Nikolaus Pevsner as "the most impressive Norman feature" in the church. It has three orders of shafts and three orders of chevron on the arch. The font is also Norman. The east window appears to have been reconstructed as a lancet window in the 13th century. On the west wall of the chapel is a painting dating from about 1200. It depicts an enthroned king, and is decorated with foliage scroll-work.

== See also ==
- List of churches preserved by the Churches Conservation Trust in the English Midlands
- Grade I listed buildings in Shropshire
- Listed buildings in Upton Cressett
