= Middridge Colliery =

Coal mining site in County Durham, England

Middridge Colliery was a colliery based in and near the village of Middridge in County Durham, England. The colliery, which was owned by The Weardale Iron and Coal Company, consisted of two mines: Eden Pit, sunk in 1872 and Charles Pit, sunk in 1874.

At its height, the pit employed 420 people, who routinely mined 600 tons of coal per day.

== Charles Pit ==
Charles Pit reached a maximum depth of 590 feet (180 metres), and contained the Brockwell coal seam at approximately 400 feet deep (roughly 119 metres).

Charles Pit closed in 1914.

The remains of Charles Pit can be seen in Charles Row and the spoil tip, still referred to in the village as "the pit heap". The pit heap contains part of the park/recreational area.

== Eden Pit ==
Coal from Charles Pit was transported here on the Tramlines; Eden had an area where the coal was then dropped down onto the Stockton and Darlington Railway.

The pit closed in 1894

A nearby settlement, consisting of 37 houses, provided homes for the miners. However, after the pit closed, the ex-miners (now almost all unemployed) and their families remained in Eden. At this stage, Eden was described as a 'stagnant, suffering village'. Despite attempts to regenerate Eden, the situation did not improve, and the entire village was demolished in the 1950s.

Today, along with nearby Riseburn, little if any trace remains.

== The Tramlines ==
A narrow gauge tramway (known as "The Tramlines") ran between the two pits. The embankment on which the railway sat still remains largely intact; including the retaining wall, which is around 3 metres high at its highest point and now forms a boundary at the edge of a public footpath.

The Tramlines embankment in October 2019

The straight path and Middridge Tramlines embankment in October 2019
