= Upton Cressett Hall =

Moated manor house in Upton Cressett, Shropshire, England

Coordinates: 52.5284°N 2.5087°W

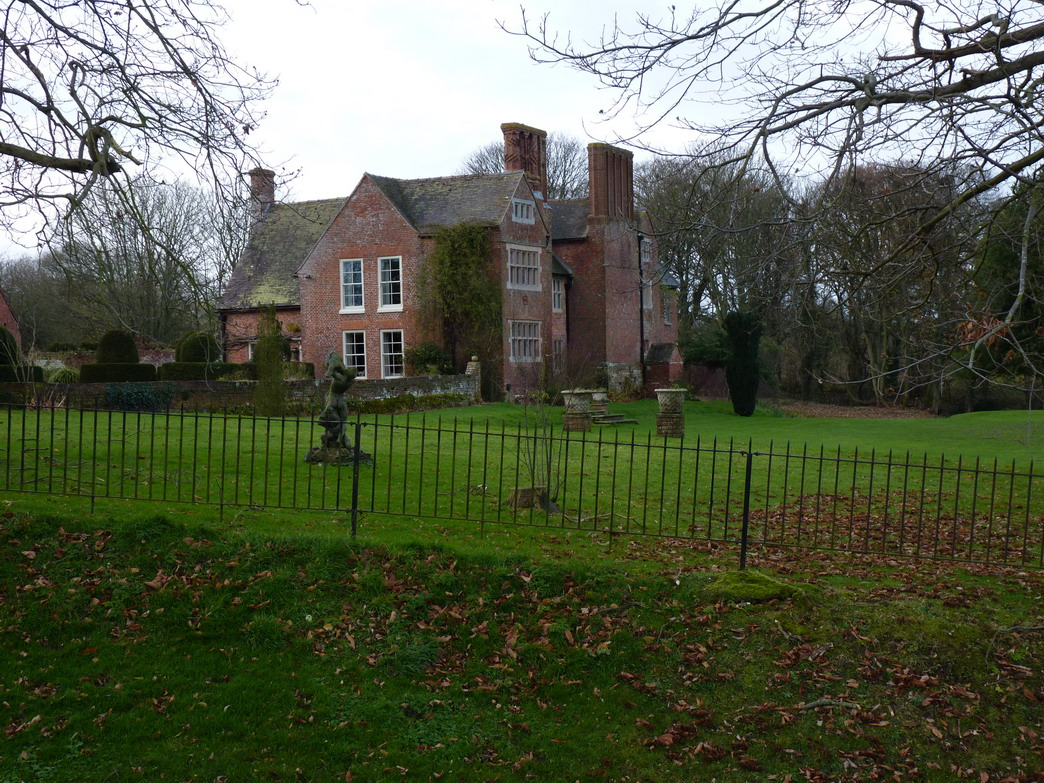
Upton Cressett Hall

Upton Cressett Hall is an Elizabethan moated manor house in the village of Upton Cressett, Shropshire, England. It is a Grade I-listed building.

The hall was built of brick between c.1540 and c.1580 for the Cressett family to an irregular floor plan and includes an aisled great hall.

== History ==
The Cressett family became Lords of Upton by marriage in the late 14th century. The hall was built on the site of an earlier house for Hugh (or Hugo) Cressett, a Royal Commissioner in the Welsh Marches and Constable of Mortimer Castle. Hugh and his son Robert were both in turn High Sheriff of Shropshire. Originally the house was timber framed with a great hall, a solar wing and a cross-wing. In 1580 the house was substantially remodelled by Richard Cressett, the High Sheriff of Shropshire for 1584, who encased the building in brick, added large brick chimneystacks and by creating a false ceiling in the great hall allowed the creation of first-floor rooms.

Richard was succeeded in 1601 by Edward Cressett, a prominent Royalist who was killed in 1646 at the Battle of Bridgnorth. Edward's son Sir Francis Cressett became Steward and Treasurer to Charles I; during the English Civil War, Upton Cressett was a Royalist stronghold. James Cressett was a senior diplomat during the reign of William III and Mary II and that of Queen Anne; he served as envoy at the Court of Hanover in the 1690s and envoy extraordinary to Frederick IV of Denmark in 1700.

After Cound Hall became the family seat in 1792, Upton Cressett Hall was used as a farmhouse until it was bought c.1937 by carpet manufacturer Sir Herbert Smith, Bt as a shooting lodge. After his death in 1943, the house was left unoccupied and gradually fell into a state of disrepair, losing some of the room panelling. It was purchased in 1969 by Sir William Cash, MP for Stone and father of the current owner, William Cash, and has since been much restored. The Hall and gardens have been open to the public, and for group visits for tea, since the 1970s.

The grounds contain several Spanish chestnut trees planted in 1815 to commemorate the Battle of Waterloo, which began to die off in more recent years. In 2015, the bicentenary of the battle, a new sapling cultivated at Hougoumont Farm was planted as a replacement by the 7th Earl Cathcart, William Cash junior's father-in-law.

== The Gatehouse ==
The Gatehouse dates from the 16th century. It has been completely renovated and is let on short-term rentals. It has been occupied at one time or another by Prince Rupert of the Rhine, King Edward V, Charles I, Margaret Thatcher, Boris Johnson, Sir John Betjeman and Elizabeth Hurley.

== See also ==
- Grade I listed buildings in Shropshire
- Listed buildings in Upton Cressett
