= Binnend =

Coordinates: 56°04′19″N 3°13′18″W

Binnend: Binnend Village, The Binn
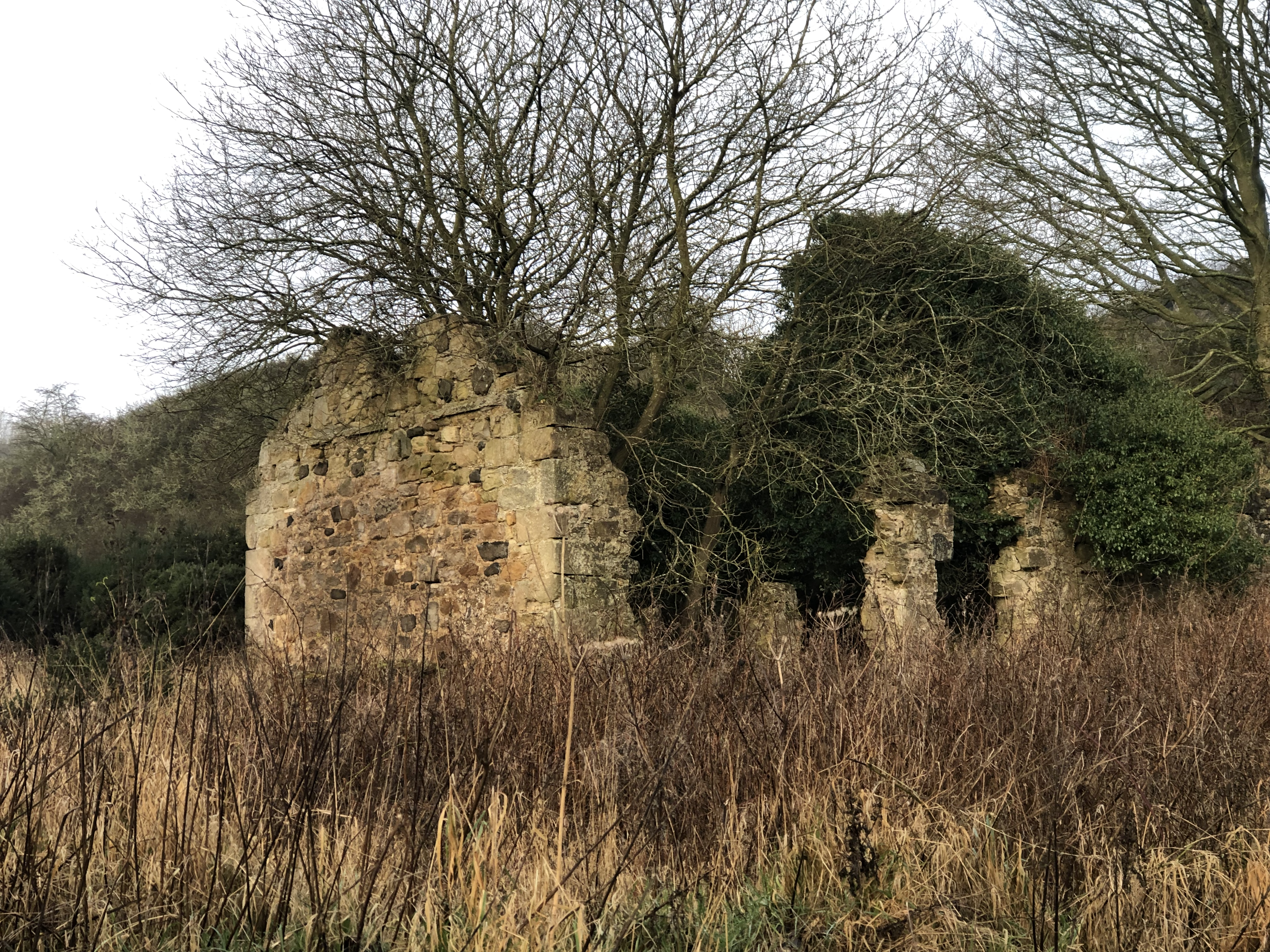

- Location within Fife
- Population: 756 (1891)
- Civil parish: Burntisland
- Council area: Fife
- Shire county: Fife
- Country: Scotland
- Sovereign state: United Kingdom

Binnend, also known as Binnend Village and The Binn, is an abandoned industrial village located two miles north of Burntisland in Fife. It was established in the late 1870s to house workers at the nearby shale oil extraction works.

== History ==
The shale works at Binnend broke ground in 1878. The village was established a few years later to house workers and their families. Shale was extracted from mines and loaded into retorts to be heated for oil extraction. The works also had factories where oil and wax products were manufactured. These included fertiliser made of ammonia, naptha to make rubber and paint, lubrications and oils for burning, and candles.

After the oil works closed in 1892 the population of Binnend Village began to decline as work was no longer available. The land was sold to the Whinnyhall Estate.

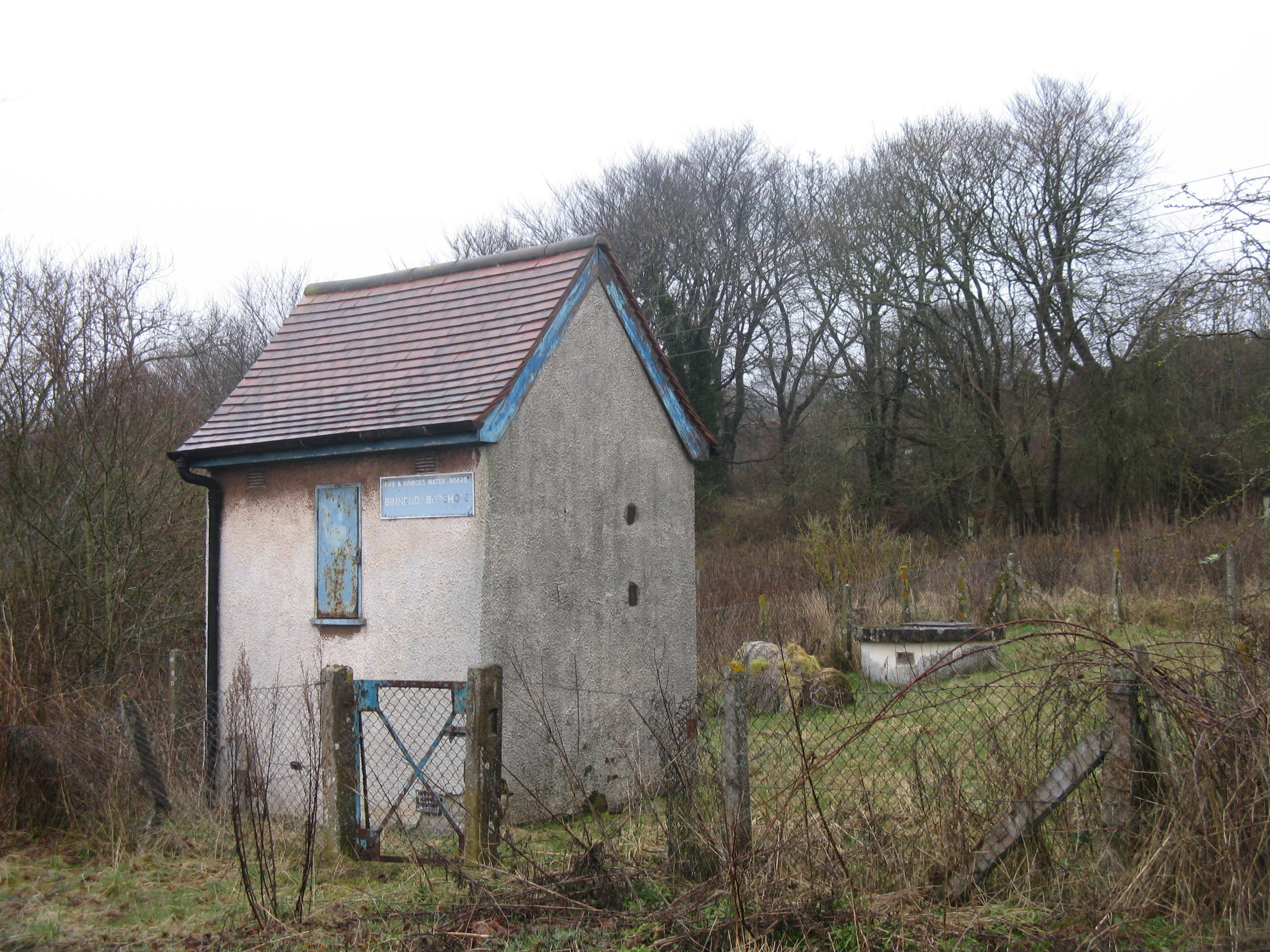
A Fife & Kinross Water Board building at Binnend

The Village was briefly used in the First World War. Houses were used for Admiralty staff who were working at Rosyth, while the school was used to provide accommodation for troops. Houses were also given to women who had lost their husbands in the war. It also provided affordable housing for workers at the nearby aluminium works and shipyards.

Its population declined again in the 1920s and 1930s. Most houses were used as holiday houses for people from other parts of Scotland, including Edinburgh and Glasgow.

Binnend Village was formally closed in 1931 due to the fact it had no piped water, gas, electricity or sanitation. The owners of the village, the Whinnyhall Estate, realised it would be too difficult to upgrade the houses to a modern standard of living. The roofs of unoccupied houses were removed so that the Estate was not required to pay rates, and all regular maintenance was ceased.

Some residents stayed on. In 1950 there were about 16 residents. In 1952, two couples named the Hoods and McLarens remained in the village, where they lived in adjacent houses. The McLarens moved away in 1952 when a council house became available in Burntisland. The last inhabitants, Mr and Mrs Hood, remained until Mrs Hood died in 1954 and George Hood (aged 74) moved to live with his son in 1954.

Today, there is a walking path that includes eight different routes from Burntisland, Standing Stane Road, and Kinghorn Loch. Ruins of the High Binn remain, but all traces of Low Binn are gone. The area where it would have stood is fenced off and contains a waste-water pond from the former Burntisland Aluminium works. The ruins of High Binn are covered in ferns, rosebay willow-herb, brambles, and trees.

== Geography ==
Binnend Village is located around a mile north-east of Burntisland in Fife, Scotland. It included two areas, the High Binn and Low Binn.

=== High Binn ===
High Binn, also known as Upper Binn, was located at the old Binnend Farm above the Binnend oil works at the top of an escarpment. Its two-bedroom stone buildings were arranged in twelve rows. Seven of these contained eight homes and five contained six homes.

=== Low Binn ===
Low Binn, also known as Lower Binn, was found east of the Binnend Oil Works near the main road. Its single-story two-bedroom stone buildings had a floor area of around 405 square feet. Both rooms had a fire place and a window. They were arranged in five rows containing six homes. Low Binn was thought of as being of a lower quality and class compared to the High Binn. This may due to the fact that it appeared to have a more transient population and because it had a larger proportion of people with Irish descent.

== Demography ==
A census from 1891 shows Binnend Village had a population of 756 individuals; 564 of these lived in High Binn, where they shared 95 two-bedroom houses. Another 192 people lived in Low Binn, sharing 33 houses. Historians have noted that houses were overcrowded with beds being used on a shift system 24 hours a day, and some people sleeping in the space between the ceiling and the roof. One couple, Dan and Rosetta Connaghan, had five children and five lodgers living in their two-bedroomed home in the Low Binn.

The majority of people living in Binnend Village were from the Fife or Lothian shale mining areas, while another thirty percent of the heads of household were of Irish descent.

After the oil works closed in 1892, the population of Binnend declined. A census from 1901 shows the population declined by 36% from 1181 individuals in 1891 to 753 in 1901. The male population declined the most as single and married men moved away in search of work. They likely would have left their families behind, sending for them once they had secured an income.

== Facilities ==
The village had two small shops, with the first opening in 1884. However, most people travelled the short distance to Burntisland to pick up their messages and other necessities. A postal delivery service began in 1884.

In 1889, a small mission hall was opened to serve all denominations. It held a weekly Sunday School for several years. The church also featured a steel bell weighing over 75 kilograms. Today, no ruins of the church remain.

Binnend School was officially opened in February 1891, servicing around 170 school-aged children in the village. Its first headmaster was James Smith who had previously taught at the Burgh Public School in Burntisland that the children from Binnend had previously attended. There may have been another three male teachers and two female teachers working at the school. The school was closed in 1895 after the village's population started to decline. In the First World War, the school was used to house troops. It was also used for dances and concerts due to its good quality wooden floor.

The village had a football pitch, located east of the High Binn near the main shale dump. It was home to a local team named the Binnend Rangers who won 27 matches during the 1891 season with a difference of 38 goals.
