= Lacoma, Exmoor =

Deserted medieval village in north Devon, England

Lacoma is a deserted medieval village on Exmoor in North Devon. It is a scheduled monument that sits within the boundaries of Exmoor National Park.

== Toponymy ==
The name Lacoma may be a shortening of "Lank Combe".

== Description ==
There is documentary evidence in the family papers of the Doones of Braemuir that Ensor, a troublesome son of James Stewart, Lord Doune, was in 1616 driven out of Scotland into exile on Exmoor, where he lived under the name of Doone until his death in 1684, producing four sons, who themselves had illegitimate issue. The doings of the family on Exmoor were "not peaceable", and they were recalled to Scotland in 1699.

The site is listed on Historic England's Heritage at Risk Register as "Badgworthy deserted medieval village, Doone's Houses".

A longhouse at the site has been identified with a farmer named Edwin who is recorded in Domesday Book (1086) as working at Lacoma.
