= Wykeham, Nettleton, Lincolnshire =

Deserted medieval village in England

Coordinates: 53°27′35″N 0°18′53″W

Wykeham
- OS grid reference: TF119970
  - London: 135 mi (217 km) S
- District: West Lindsey
- Shire county: Lincolnshire
- Region: East Midlands
- Country: England
- Sovereign state: United Kingdom
- Post town: Market Rasen
- Postcode district: LN7
- Police: Lincolnshire
- Fire: Lincolnshire
- Ambulance: East Midlands

Wykeham, is a deserted medieval village in the civil parish of Nettleton, in the West Lindsey district of Lincolnshire, England. The site is close to Nettleton Top.

Wykeham is listed in the Domesday Book and mentioned in 1334. The site was confirmed by aerial photography. Two millstones were found during an excavation, and those are lost.
