= West Wykeham =

Deserted medieval village in East Lindsey, Lincolnshire, England

Coordinates: 53°22′46″N 0°10′19″W

- OS grid reference: TF217885
  - London: 130 mi (210 km) S
- District: East Lindsey
- Shire county: Lincolnshire
- Region: East Midlands
- Country: England
- Sovereign state: United Kingdom
- Post town: Market Rasen
- Postcode district: LN8
- Police: Lincolnshire
- Fire: Lincolnshire
- Ambulance: East Midlands

West Wykeham is a deserted medieval village in East Lindsey, Lincolnshire, England. It is situated just over 1 mile (1.6 km) east from Ludford.

West Wykeham is recorded in documents of 1334. The village was impoverished by the end of the 14th century.
