= East Wykeham =

Medieval village in Lincolnshire, England

Coordinates: 53°22′35″N 0°09′30″W

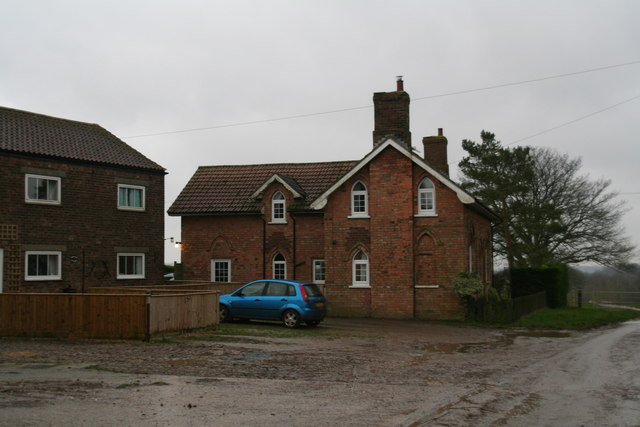
- Farmhouse on the edge of Wykeham Park

- Location within Lincolnshire
- OS grid reference: TF225882
- Civil parish: Ludford
- District: East Lindsey
- Shire county: Lincolnshire
- Region: East Midlands
- Country: England
- Sovereign state: United Kingdom
- Post town: Market Rasen
- Postcode district: LN8
- Police: Lincolnshire
- Fire: Lincolnshire
- Ambulance: East Midlands

East Wykeham is a deserted medieval village or DMV, seen as earthworks, in the civil parish of Ludford, in the East Lindsey district of Lincolnshire, England. The earthworks are situated about 7 miles (11 km) north-west of the town of Louth, and 9 miles (14 km) east of the town of Market Rasen. In 1971 the parish had a population of 21. On 1 April 1987 the parish was abolished and merged with Ludford.

East Wykeham is also mentioned in 1316, and formed a single parish with West Wykeham. It became part of Ludford in 1396, and only one family survived in 1563. By 1603-04 the church was in ruins.

Wykeham Hall survived the abandonment of the village, and still stands. The drive passes through the site of East Wykeham. The ruined church, possibly re-built as a folly around 1800, now contains monuments to the Child family of Wykeham Hall.

== Gallery ==
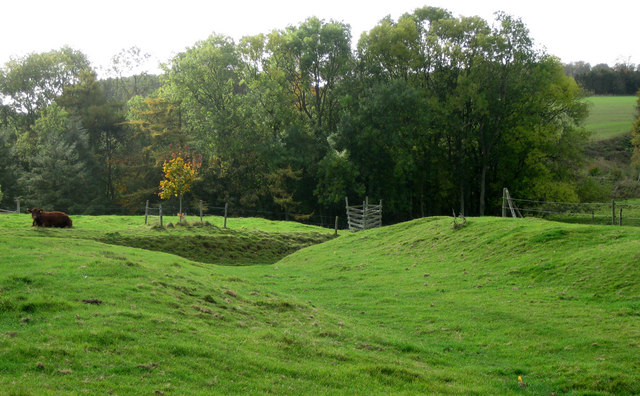
East Wykeham

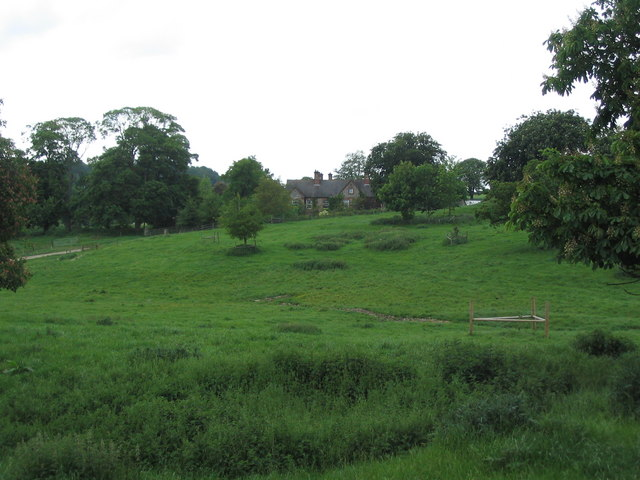
Wykeham Hall
