= Elizabeth Hussey =

- Died: c.1606
- Spouses: Anthony Crane, George Carleton
- Issue: Mary Crane
- Father: Sir Robert Hussey
- Mother: Jane Stydolf

Elizabeth Hussey (died c. 1606), later Elizabeth Crane and Elizabeth Carleton, was a religious activist with strong Puritan sympathies. She and her second husband, George Carleton, were prosecuted for involvement in the Marprelate controversy. The first of the anonymous Marprelate tracts, Martin's Epistle, was printed at her home in East Molesey, Surrey, in October 1588.

== Family ==
Elizabeth Hussey, born near the end of the reign of Henry VIII, was the eldest daughter of Sir Robert Hussey (d. 1546) of Linwood, Lincolnshire, and his second wife, Jane Stydolf, the daughter of Thomas Stydolf of Surrey. Her father was a younger brother of John Hussey, 1st Baron Hussey of Sleaford. Her paternal grandparents were William Hussey (d. 1495), Chief Justice of the King's Bench, and Elizabeth Berkeley, the daughter of Thomas Berkeley of Wymondham, Leicestershire.

== Marriages and issue ==
For many years Hussey was wrongly identified as the wife of the Puritan minister Nicholas Crane, who died in Newgate prison about 1588. However, in 1931 McCorkle established that Hussey's first husband was Anthony Crane (d. 16 August 1583), Elizabeth I's Cofferer and Master of the Household, who had Puritan sympathies. They had one daughter, Mary, who married Gerald Gore. Mary was buried in the parish of St Mary Aldermanbury on 1 March 1606. Her husband survived her, and in 1608 was recorded as 'holding the manor of East Molesey by virtue of letters patents granted to Anthony Crane'. He was buried 27 March 1614.

After her first husband's death, Crane married George Carleton, stepfather of Sir Anthony Cope, 1st Baronet. Born in 1529, he was the second son of John Carleton of Walton-on-Thames, Surrey, and Brightwell Baldwin, Oxfordshire, by Joyce Welbeck, the daughter of John Welbeck of Oxon Hoath, Kent. There were no issue of the marriage.

== Career ==
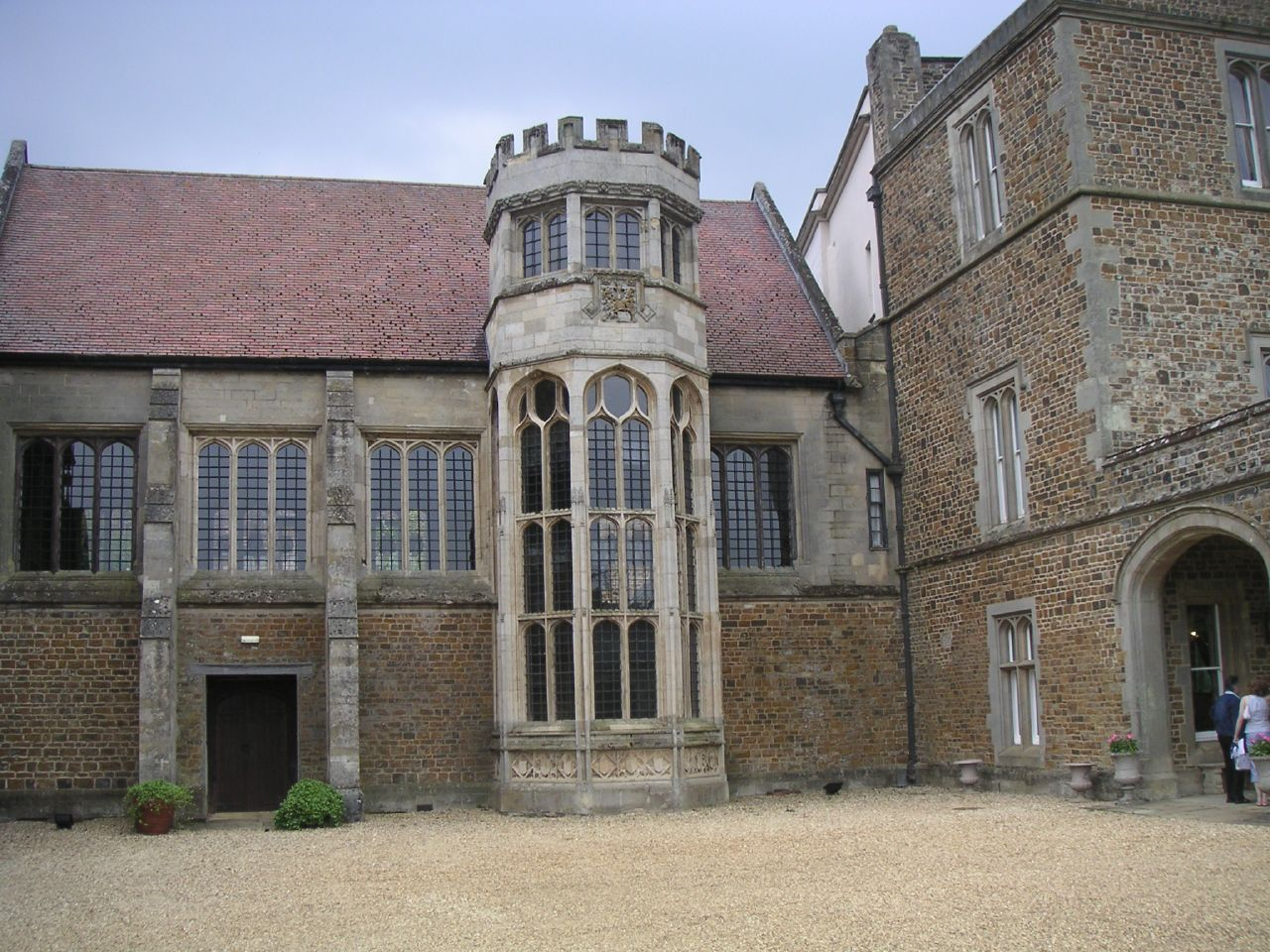
Sir Richard Knightley's home at Fawsley Hall, where John Penry moved the secret press after Martin's Epistle was printed at Elizabeth Crane's country home at East Molesey.

Anthony Crane appears to have been associated with religious reform as early as 1572, and after his death in 1583, Elizabeth Crane continued to assist Puritan writers and printers. According to the later testimony of her servant, Nicholas Tompkins, when the Puritan printer Robert Waldegrave's press and type were being destroyed by officers of the Stationers' Company in May 1588 as a result of his having printed John Udall's The State of the Church of England Laid Open, commonly referred to as Diotrephes' Dialogue, she allowed Waldegrave to bring a case of type, hidden under his cloak, to her London home in St Mary Aldermanbury. The Puritan preacher and pamphleteer John Penry secretly obtained a new press for Waldegrave, and in the late spring of 1588 she allowed Penry and Waldegrave to set it up at her country home at East Molesey, Surrey, across the Thames from Hampton Court Palace. The first tract to be printed on the secret press was Udall's Demonstration of Discipline.

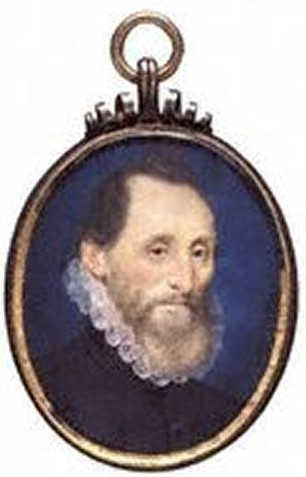
Henry Stanley, 4th Earl of Derby, whose agents captured the secret press on which the Marprelate tracts were printed

Penry and Waldegrave then embarked on an even more controversial enterprise, the printing of the first four of the seven tracts written against the ecclesiastical authorities by an unknown satirist using the pseudonym Martin Marprelate. The first of the Marprelate tracts, Martin's Epistle, was printed at East Molesey in October 1588. It enjoyed immense popularity, and the ecclesiastical authorities instigated a hue and cry after Martin, as a result of which Penry moved the secret press to Sir Richard Knightley's house at Fawsley in Northamptonshire, where Martin's second tract, The Epitome, was printed. Shortly thereafter the press was moved East Molesey to the Whitefriars, Coventry, the home of Knightley's great-nephew, John Hales, where Certain Mineral and Metaphysical Schoolpoints and Hay Any Work for Cooper were printed, the former in early January and the latter in late March 1589. Waldegrave then refused to print any further tracts, citing the Puritan ministers' disapproval of Martin Marprelate's course of action.

The secret press was then moved to Wolston Priory in Warwickshire, the home of Roger Wigston, where in July 1589 the printer John Hodgkins, with the help of Valentine Simmes and Arthur Thomlyn, printed two tracts, the Theses Martinianae and The Just Censure, which became known as Martin Junior and Martin Senior respectively, as they were purportedly written by Martin Marprelate's 'sons'. The press was then moved to Manchester, where in August 1589 the agents of Henry Stanley, 4th Earl of Derby, seized the press and destroyed the tract then being printed, More Work for the Cooper. The printers were taken to London and racked. In early September Henry Sharpe, who had bound the printed copies of the Marprelate tracts, was arrested, and as a result of his interrogation the authorities were able to arrest most of those involved. However Sharpe was unable to identify Martin Marprelate.

In late September the last of the Marprelate tracts, The Protestation, was published, perhaps at Wolston Priory on the press Waldegrave had left there. According to Black, Penry and Job Throckmorton may have printed the first pages, which 'appear to have been set by amateurs', while Waldegrave may have been responsible for the printing of the latter pages.

At some time in 1589 Crane married her second husband, George Carleton, and it was as Elizabeth Carleton that she was examined on 1 October 1589 by the ecclesiastical commissioners. She refused to answer any of the questions put to her on the ground that she would neither be 'her own hangman' nor could she 'in her conscience be an accuser of others'. Together with Sir Richard Knightley, John Hales, and Roger Wigston and his wife, she was imprisoned in the Fleet. The interrogations of Knightley, Hales and the Wigstons likewise failed to elicit the identity of Martin Marprelate, which appears to have been unknown to those who harboured the secret press.

The precise date on which charges were brought against Carleton in the Court of Star Chamber is not known; however, proceedings commenced between 13 January and 13 July 1590, and on 17 May 1590 she swore an answer at the Fleet prison before William Mill, Clerk of that Court. She was fined 1000 marks for having refused to take the oath ex officio, and £500 for having harboured the secret press. It was also ordered that she be imprisoned during the Queen's pleasure, although no records are extant documenting her further imprisonment.

The date of her death and place of burial are unknown, although it is thought she predeceased her daughter, who died in 1606.
