= John Hales (died 1608) =

British landowner

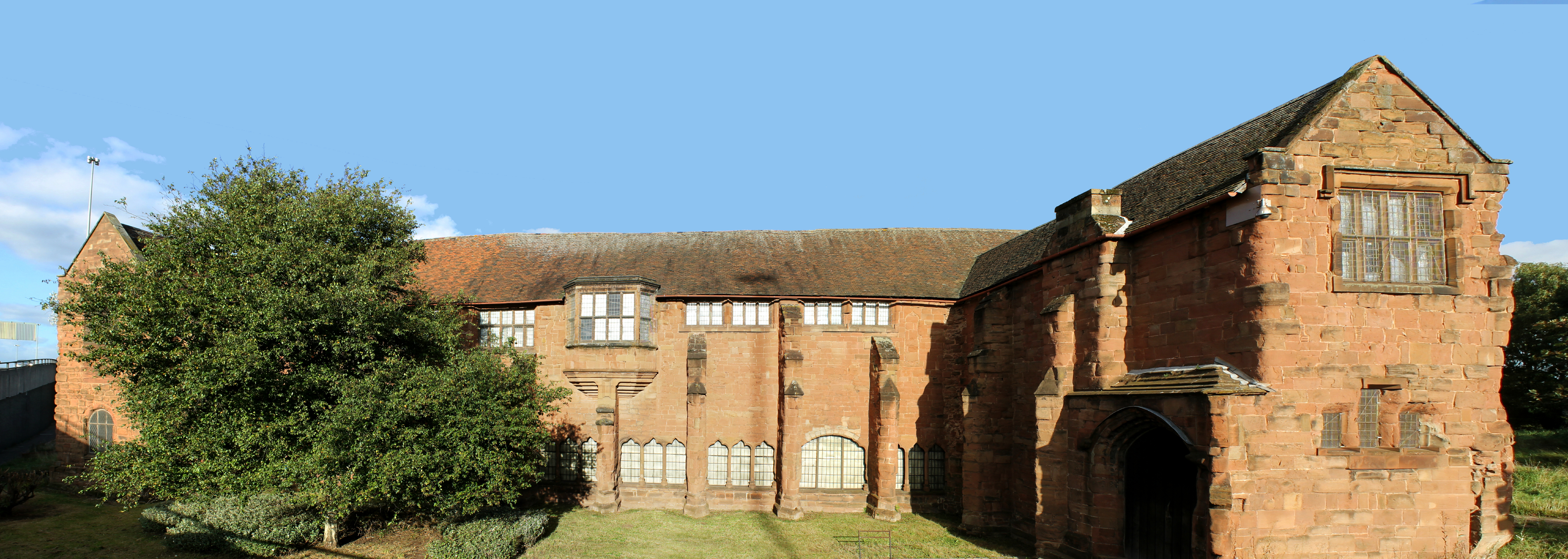
- John Hales's former residence, the Whitefriars, where the Marprelate tracts were printed, as it was in 2012
- Died: 1 January 1608
- Spouses: Frideswide Faunt; Avis (surname unknown)
- Children: Mary Hales; Jane Hales; Bethany Hales
- Parent(s): Christopher Hales, Mary Lucy

John Hales (died 1 January 1608) was the owner of the Whitefriars in Coventry at which two of the Marprelate tracts were printed on a secret press. He was the nephew and heir of John Hales, Clerk of the Hanaper, and the nephew of Sir Thomas Lucy of Charlecote.

== Family ==
John Hales was the son of Christopher Hales of Coventry and Mary Lucy, the daughter of William Lucy, esquire, and Anne Fermor, and sister of Sir Thomas Lucy of Charlecote, Warwickshire.

== Career ==
Little is known of Hales's early life. In 1589, at the request of his great-uncle Sir Richard Knightley of Fawsley, he allowed the press on which the Marprelate tracts were being printed secretly to be brought to his house at the Whitefriars in Coventry by Knightley's servant Stephen Gyfford. The first of the tracts, Martin Marprelate's Epistle, had been printed at the home of Elizabeth Hussey in East Molesey. The second tract, The Epitome, had been printed at Sir Richard Knightley's house at Fawsley. At the time, Knightley was married to his second wife, Elizabeth Seymour, a daughter of Edward Seymour, 1st Duke of Somerset, and a cousin of King Edward VI. Two of the Marprelate tracts, Certain Mineral and Metaphysical Schoolpoints and Hay Any Work for Cooper, as well as John Penry's A View, were printed at the Whitefriars by Robert Waldegrave. The secret press was then moved to Sir Roger Wigston's house of Wolston Priory.

Henry Sharpe, who had bound the printed copies of the Marprelate tracts, later gave evidence implicating Hales, Knightley, and the Wigstons, and a special commission appointed on 16 November 1589 by the Privy Council ordered their interrogation, having concluded that:

Sir Richard Knightley, Roger Wigston and John Hales have been acquainted with the printing and publishing of the said books, and have been favourers and abetters of the said Martin Marprelate in his disordered proceedings.

In November 1589 Hales, Elizabeth Hussey, Sir Richard Knightley, and Sir Roger Wigston and his wife were arrested and imprisoned in the Fleet. However, their interrogation failed to elicit the identity of Martin Marprelate, which appears to have been unknown to those who harboured the secret press.

On 13 February 1590 Hales, Knightley, and the Wigstons were arraigned in the Star Chamber. At trial, Knightley admitted to having written to Hales requesting that he provide room for the secret press at Coventry. Despite his plea for the Queen's forgiveness, Knightley was fined £2000, and it was ordered that he be imprisoned at the Queen's pleasure. Hales denied all knowledge of the nature of the books printed on the secret press, and protested, in excuse of his actions, that:

He had great reason, as he thought, to gratify Sir Richard Knightley in anything, to whom he owed much reverence, as he that had married his aunt'.

Hales was fined 1000 marks, and, like Knightley, was ordered to be committed to prison.

Sir Roger Wigston was fined 500 marks, with a similar order for his imprisonment. His wife, who took upon herself the blame for persuading her husband to allow the printing of the tracts at their house, was fined £1000 and similarly imprisoned at the Queen's pleasure.

The latter part of Hales's life appears to have been uneventful. He left a will dated 30 August 1607 in which he named a son, John, and three daughters, Mary, Jane, and Bethany.

== Marriages and issue ==
Hales married firstly, by settlement dated 18 September 1586, Frideswide Faunt, the daughter of William Faunt, esquire, of Foston, Leicestershire, and his second wife, Jane Vincent (d. 1585). She was the widow of Roger Cotton, esquire.

He married secondly a wife named Avis, who survived him.
