= George Carleton (MP) =

Member of the Parliament of England (1529–1590)

- Born: 1529
- Died: January 1590 (aged 60–61)
- Spouses: Audrey Harper; Elizabeth Mohun; Elizabeth Hussey
- Issue: Castle Carleton; Elizabeth Carleton
- Father: John Carleton
- Mother: Joyce Welbeck

George Carleton (1529 – January 1590) was a lawyer, landowner and Member of Parliament with strong Puritan sympathies. It has been suggested that he was the secret author of the Marprelate tracts, and both he and his third wife were prosecuted for their involvement in the Marprelate controversy. Ordered to appear daily before the Privy Council in April 1589, he died in early 1590 before a decision in the proceedings against him had been reached.

== Family ==
George Carleton, born in 1529, was the second son of John Carleton of Walton-on-Thames, Surrey, and Brightwell Baldwin, Oxfordshire, and Joyce Welbeck, the daughter of John Welbeck of Oxon Hoath, Kent. His maternal grandmother, Margaret Culpeper, was the aunt of Henry VIII's fifth wife, Katherine Howard.

The inscription on his father's monument states that he had four brothers, Anthony Carleton (grandfather of Dudley Carleton, 1st Viscount Dorchester); William (said to have been a priest); John (who died unmarried at Bologna); and Edward, and four sisters: Anne, who married Rowland Lytton; Katherine, who married Francis Blount, younger brother of James Blount, 6th Baron Mountjoy; Mabel, who married John Fetch of Haddenham, Buckinghamshire; and Jane, who married Erasmus Gainsford, son of Sir John Gainsford (d.1540) of Crowhurst, Surrey.

== Career ==
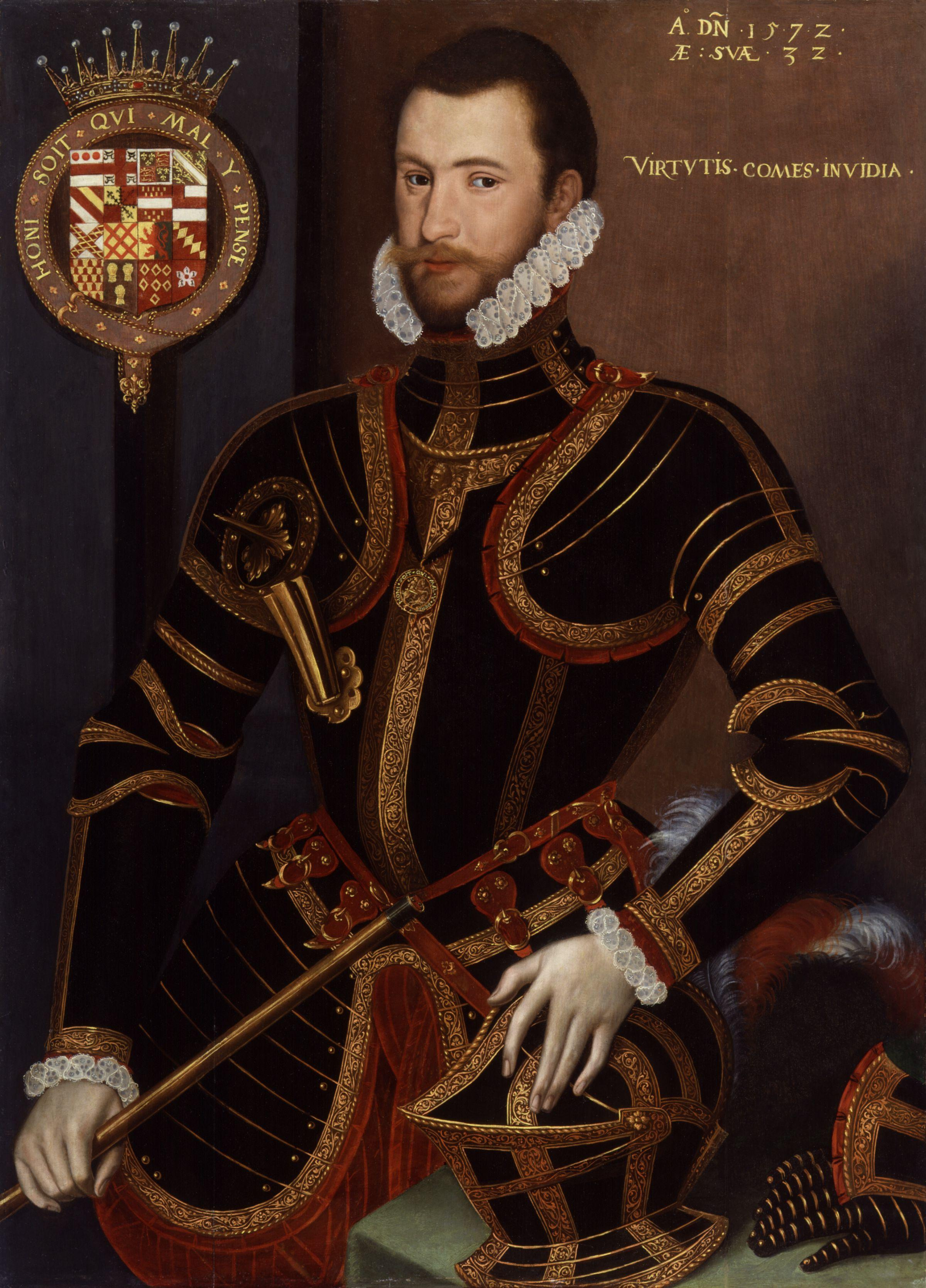
Walter Devereux, 1st Earl of Essex, in whose Irish campaign George Carleton served as treasurer

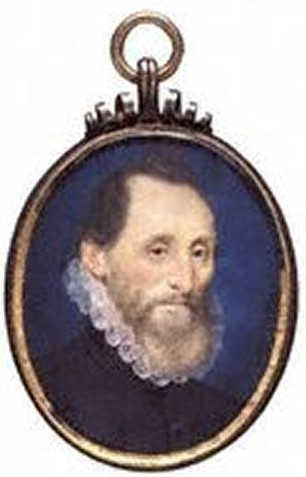
Henry Stanley, 4th Earl of Derby, whose agents captured the secret press on which the Marprelate tracts were printed

Carleton's father had been receiver to the Abbot of Westminster and deputy receiver-general to the Dean and Chapter of Westminster, and through this connection George Carleton was granted an exhibition at Christ Church, Oxford. In 1552 he was admitted to Gray's Inn. He later used his legal skills in the interests of friends, kinsmen and others, acting as trustee in the affairs of his brother, Anthony Carleton, his brother-in-law, Rowland Lytton, Sir Richard Knightley, and James Blount, 6th Baron Mountjoy, who by 1566 was thousands of pounds in debt.

He served in a military capacity on two occasions, in 1557 as a captain at the siege of St Quentin, and in 1573 as treasurer to the Earl of Essex's expedition to Ireland.

Over time he became a substantial landowner. He inherited his father's property at Walton-on-Thames, and spent his early years there, but by 1568 had conveyed it to his younger brother, Edward. His inheritance from his father also included lands in Cambridgeshire and Huntingdonshire. Through his second marriage he acquired lands in Oxfordshire and Northamptonshire, including the manor of Overstone, which he used as a principal residence. He also purchased extensive lands in Gloucestershire, and during the later part of his life acquired substantial interests in former monastic properties in the fenlands, including some 1000 acres of marshland used for grazing, as well as a house in Wisbech and the manor of Coldham. As a landowner in the Lincolnshire fens he pioneered the use of windmills, served as a commissioner for sewers, and was the first to have 'inned any marsh in Holland'.

He was also involved in financial transactions with his stepson by his second marriage, Sir Anthony Cope. In 1571 they entered into a recognizance in the amount of £1000, and in 1576 Carleton was granted the stewardship of the manor of Wollaston in Northamptonshire, which he appears to have obtained for Cope's benefit.

He served as a Justice of the Peace in the counties of Oxfordshire, Northamptonshire, and Lincolnshire, as well as the Isle of Ely. Perhaps through the influence of Francis Russell, 2nd Earl of Bedford, he was chosen as a Member of Parliament for Poole in 1571 and Dorchester in 1572, 1576, and 1581. He was also superintendent over the Jesuits and Catholic recusants during their imprisonment in Wisbech Castle.

Carleton was an 'ardent' Puritan who believed that Elizabeth I's only 'reliable subjects' were Puritans like himself, and put forward to Lord Burghley a proposal that the Queen's Catholic subjects should be settled on plantations in Ireland, as well as a proposal for a militia composed 'chiefly of such as be religious' to guard the Queen. He befriended Percival Wiburn, a Puritan preacher in Northampton, and after Wiburn had been silenced by the authorities, brought two other radical ministers from London, Nicholas Standon and Edward Bulkeley, whose sermons were given at Carleton's home at Overstone. In Parliament, he devoted his energies to bringing about further religious reform 'along Presbyterian lines', supporting the efforts in that regard of William Strickland, Paul Wentworth, and Peter Wentworth.

Carleton's Puritan views led him, during the last year of his life, to involvement in the printing of the Marprelate tracts. In 1589 he married 'Mistress Crane', at whose country home at East Molesey in Surrey, across the river from Hampton Court Palace, the first of the Marprelate tracts, Martin's Epistle, was printed by Robert Waldegrave on a secret press in October 1588.

After the printing of the Epistle, the press was moved to Fawsley in Northamptonshire, the home of Sir Richard Knightley, whom Collinson terms 'an enthusiast not entirely compos mentis, whose affairs were in Carleton's hands'. Martin's Epitome was printed at Fawsley. From there the press was taken to the Whitefriars in Coventry, and to Wolston Priory in Warwickshire, where further tracts were printed. Although the secret press was not captured by agents of Henry Stanley, 4th Earl of Derby, until August 1589, according to Carlson, as early as April 1589 Carleton had been ordered to appear before the Privy Council, and directed to attend daily until given permission to depart. After the capture of the secret press in August, those in whose homes the Marprelate tracts had been printed were arrested and imprisoned in the Fleet. Carleton died in early January 1590 before a decision had been reached in any proceedings which may have been instigated against him. His widow was ordered by the Court of Star Chamber to be imprisoned at the Queen's pleasure, and heavily fined, as were others who had been involved.

Both Longley and Collinson have suggested that Carleton might have been the secret author of the Marprelate tracts.

== Marriages and issue ==
He married firstly, in 1559, Audrey Gainsford, widow successively of George Taylor of Lingfield, Surrey, and Sir George Harper (1503–1558) of Sutton Valence, Kent, and daughter of Sir John Gainsford (d.1540) of Crowhurst, Surrey, and his fifth wife Audrey Shaa, daughter of Sir John Shaa, Lord Mayor of London. She died in early 1560.

He married secondly, in 1561, Elizabeth Mohun (d.1587), widow of Edward Cope of Hanwell, Oxfordshire and daughter of Walter Mohun of Overstone, by whom he had a son, Castle Carleton, and a daughter, Elizabeth Carleton.

He married thirdly Elizabeth Hussey, the eldest daughter of Sir Robert Hussey (d.1546) of Linwood, Lincolnshire, and his second wife, Jane Stydolf, the daughter of Thomas Stydolf of Surrey. Her father was a younger brother of John Hussey, 1st Baron Hussey of Sleaford, while her paternal grandparents were William Hussey (d.1495), Chief Justice of the King's Bench, and Elizabeth Berkeley, the daughter of Thomas Berkeley of Wymondham, Leicestershire.

There were no children of his first and third marriages.
