= Richard Knightley =

Member of the Parliament of England

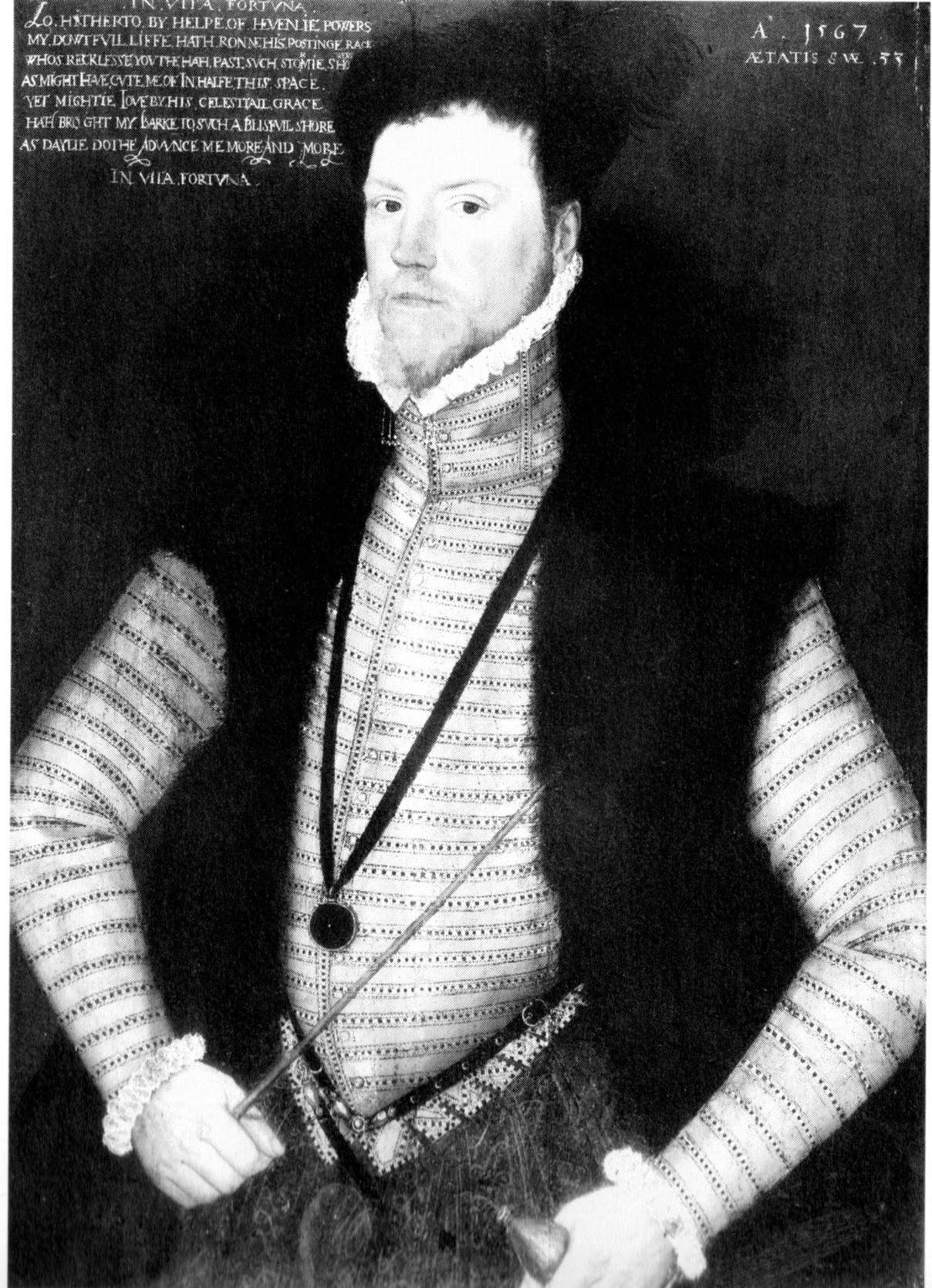
Richard Knightley, 1567

Arms of Knightley: Quarterly ermine and paly of six or and gules

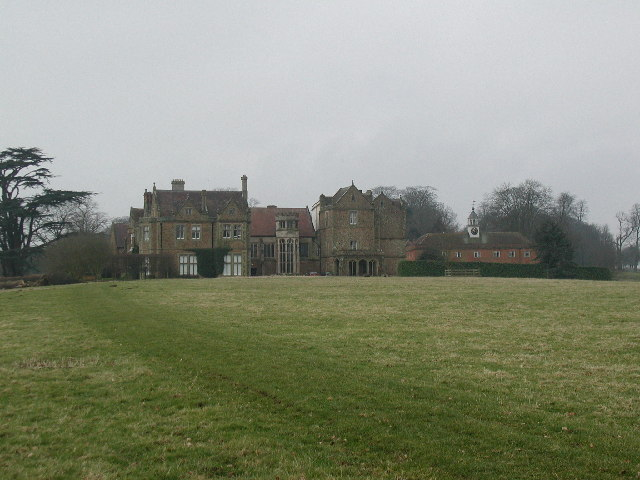
Fawsley Hall, Northamptonshire

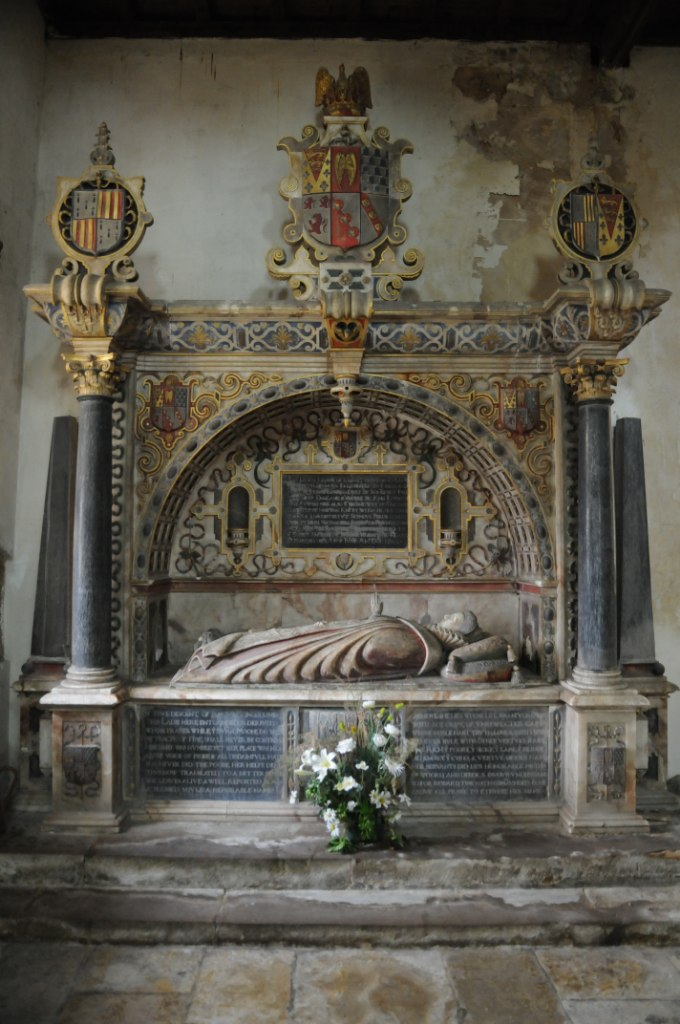
Monument to Lady Elizabeth Seymour (d.1602), second wife of Sir Richard Knightley; All Saints Church, Norton, Northamptonshire

Sir Richard Knightley (1533 – 1 September 1615) of Fawsley Hall in Northamptonshire was an English Member of Parliament (MP) and leading patron of the Puritans during the reign of Elizabeth I. The Knightleys were one of the leading families of Northamptonshire.

== Biography ==
Knightley was the eldest son of Sir Valentine Knightley of Fawsley and his wife Anne (née Ferrers). He succeeded his father in 1566 and was knighted in 1565.

He was MP for Northampton in the Parliaments of 1584 and 1586, and for Northamptonshire in those of 1589 and 1598. He served as High Sheriff of Northamptonshire in 1568–1569 and 1581–1582. In 1587, he was commanded by Queen Elizabeth to be present at the execution of Mary, Queen of Scots at Fotheringhay Castle and her funeral at Peterborough Cathedral.

He was a conspicuous member of the Puritan faction in Parliament, and in November 1588 was involved in the printing of the Marprelate tracts. In the late spring of 1588, Elizabeth Hussey allowed the printer Robert Waldegrave and the Puritan preacher and pamphleteer John Penry to set up a secret press at her country home at East Molesey, Surrey, across the Thames from Hampton Court Palace. The first tract to be printed there was a work by John Udall, the Demonstration of Discipline.

In late 1588 and early 1589, Waldegrave embarked on an even more controversial enterprise, printing the first four tracts written against the ecclesiastical authorities by an unknown satirist using the pseudonym Martin Marprelate. The first of the Marprelate tracts, Martin's Epistle was printed on the secret press in October 1588.

It enjoyed immense popularity, and the ecclesiastical authorities instigated a hue and cry after Martin. In November the press was moved from East Molesey to Sir Richard Knightley's house at Fawsley, where Martin's second tract, The Epitome, was printed. Knightley may even have met the expense of the printing.

Shortly thereafter, the secret press was moved to the Whitefriars, Coventry, the home of Knightley's great-nephew, John Hales, where Certaine Minerall and Metaphysicall Schoolpoints and Hay Any Worke for Cooper were printed, the former in early January and the latter in late March 1589. Waldegrave then refused to print any further tracts, citing the Puritan ministers' disapproval of Martin Marprelate's course of action. The secret press was then moved to Wolston Priory in Warwickshire, the home of Roger Wigston. The secret press was captured in 1589, and Knightley was arrested, although subsequently released. In February 1589, he was fined £2,000 by the Court of Star Chamber, and dismissed from the lieutenancy of the county and the magistracy. In 1605, he was again fined, this time the sum of £10,000.

He was MP for Orford, Suffolk in 1601. He died on 1 September 1615 in Norton, Northamptonshire.

== Marriages and children ==
He married twice:

- Firstly to Mary Fermor, a daughter of Richard Fermor of Easton Neston, by whom he had three sons and three daughters.
- Secondly to Lady Elizabeth Seymour (d.1602), a daughter of Edward Seymour, 1st Duke of Somerset, by whom he had seven sons and seven daughters. Her portrait was painted by Marcus Gheeraerts the Younger including the Seymour phoenix badge. Her monument with effigy survives in All Saints Church, Norton, Northamptonshire. His son and heir, Valentine, and a grandson, Richard, were also Members of Parliament.
