= Dirk Graswinckel =

Dutch jurist and writer

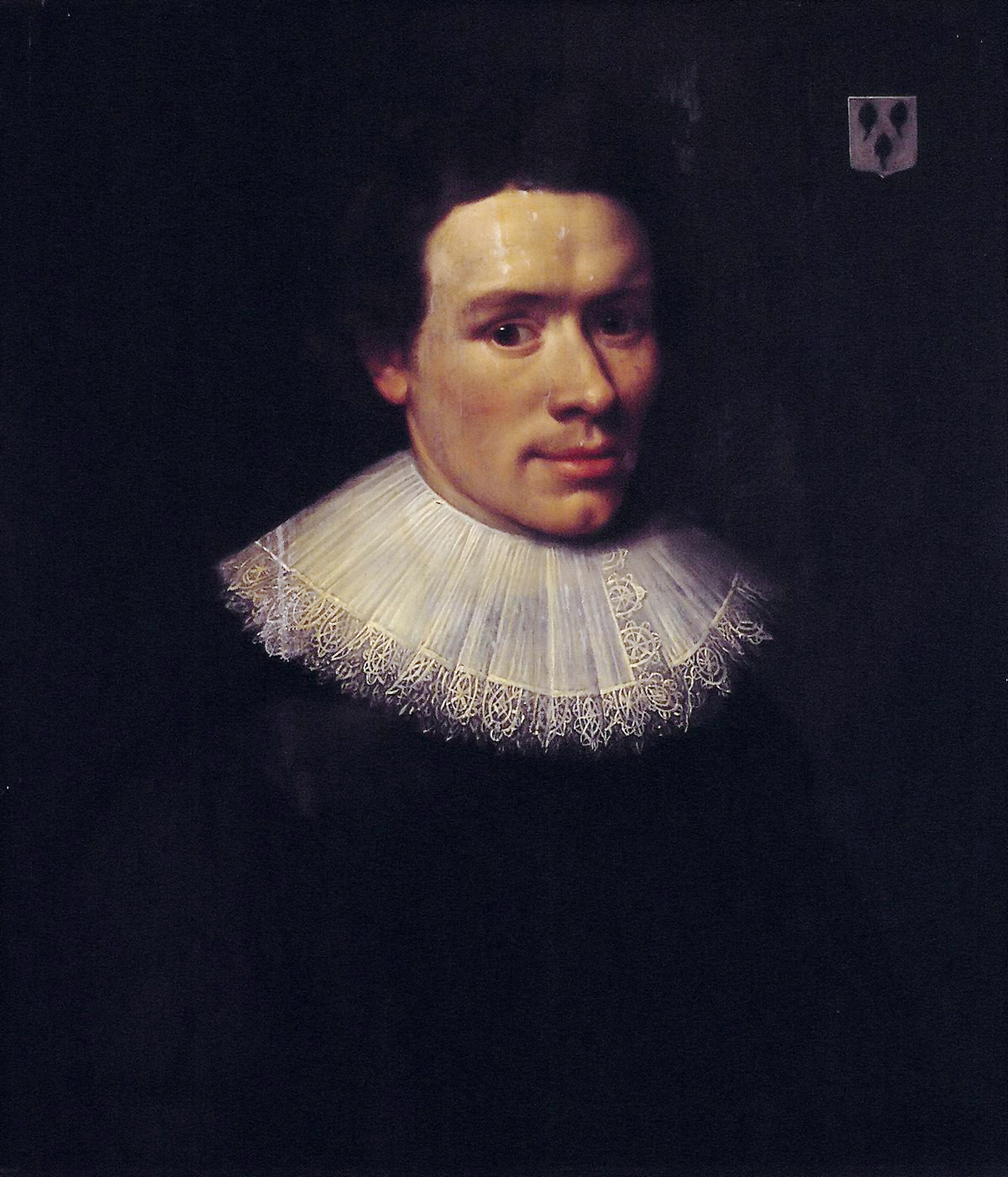
Dirk Graswinckel, (Michiel Jansz van Mierevelt, 1623)

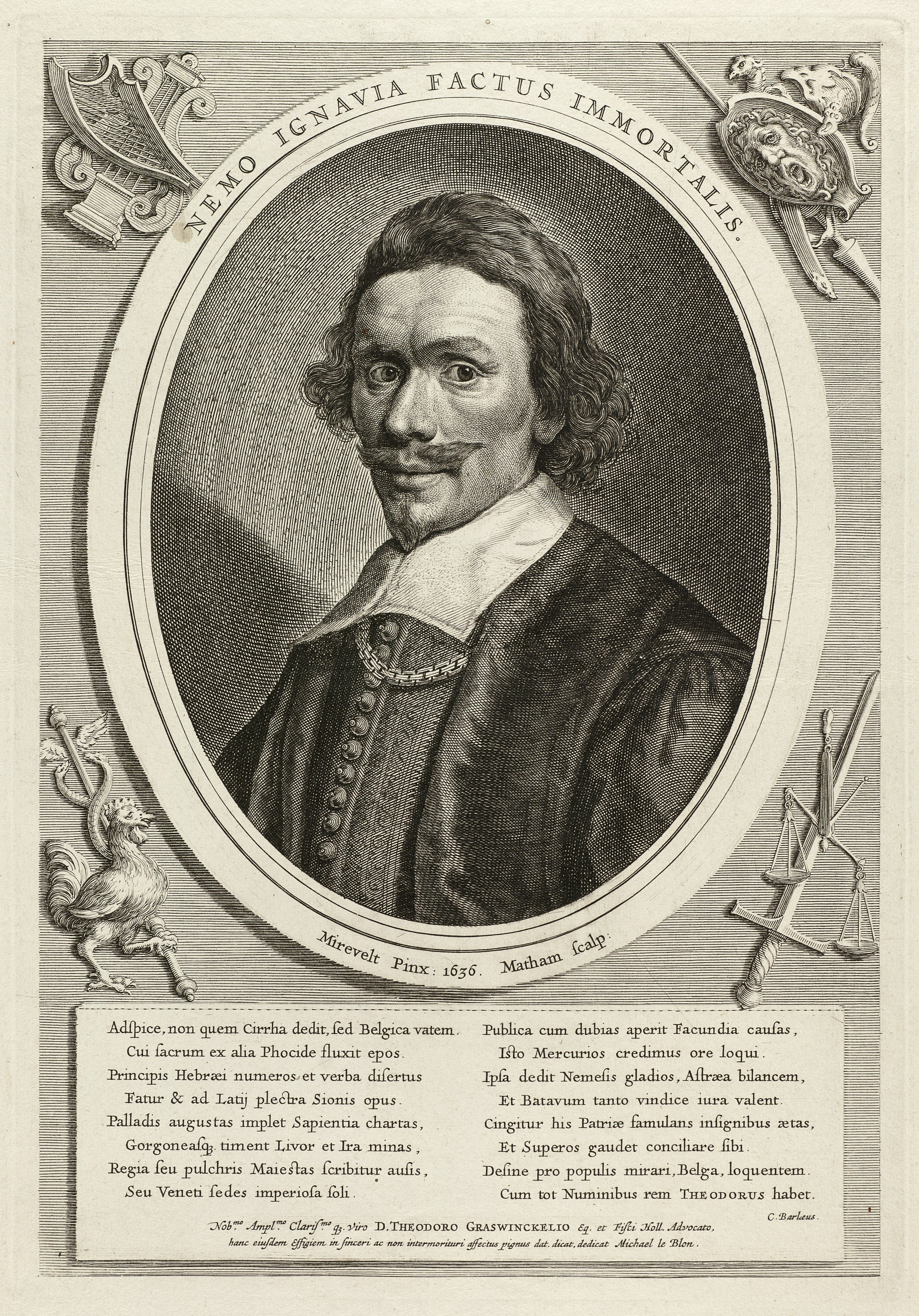
Dirk Graswinckel (1636)

Theodorus Johannes "Dirk" Graswinckel (1 October 1600 – 12 October 1666) was a Dutch jurist, a significant writer on the freedom of the seas. He was a controversialist, who also rose to a high legal position (Fiscal of Holland) where he advised Descartes. He was a cousin and pupil of Grotius. He was also a poet and translator of Thomas à Kempis.

== Life ==
He was born in Delft, and studied at the University of Leiden. He joined Grotius in Paris in 1624, and later defended him against Johannes a Felden (John De Felde).

Libertas Veneta (1634) replied to the anonymous anti-Venetian pamphlet Squitinio della liberti veneta (1612). It is in effect also an answer to a work on maritime law by William Welwod.

Maris liberi vindiciae attacked Burgus (Pietro Battista Borgo) writing for Genoese pretensions in the Ligurian Sea, but also took on John Selden on the British claim to territorial waters. Selden's Mare Clausum had been published in an English translation in 1652, and he replied the following year with Ioannis Seldeni vindiciae secundum integritatem existimationis suae. In fact, Graswinckel had sent Selden a detailed critique in manuscript in 1635.

In 1651, he published a work Placcaten, ordonnantien ende reglementen on the economics of regulation of the grain trade. This came down largely on the side of free trade and the price mechanism. Joseph Schumpeter argued that this was the first clear-cut statement that speculators had a role in the stability of commodity markets.

He died in Mechelen.

== Works ==
- Libertas Veneta (1634)
- De Jure Majestatis (1642)
- Dissertatio de jure praecedentiae inter serenissimam Venetam Rempubl. & sereniss. Sabaudiae ducem (1644)
- Maris liberi vindiciae: adversus P. B. Burgum (1652)
- Stricturae ad censuram Joannis à Felden (1654)
- Nasporinge van het recht van de opperste macht toekomende de Edele Groot Mogende Heeren Staten van Holland en Westvriesland (1667)
