= Robert Waldegrave =

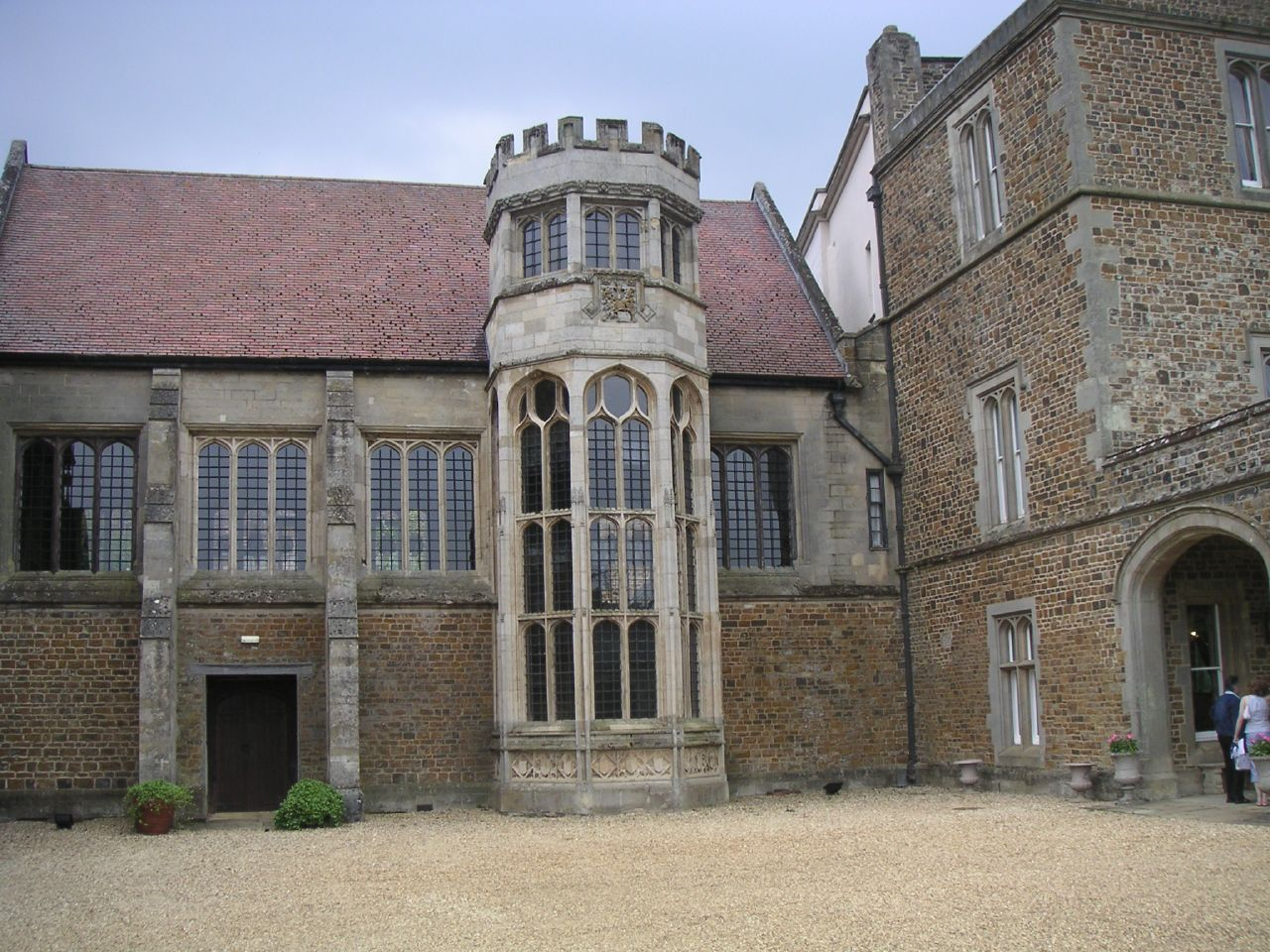
- Fawsley Hall, home of Sir Richard Knightley, where Robert Waldegrave printed Martin Marprelate's Epitome on a secret press
- Born: c.1554
- Died: October 1603
- Spouse: Mary (surname unknown)
- Children: seven children, including a son, Robert
- Parent(s): Richard Waldegrave, mother's name unknown

Robert Waldegrave or Walgrave (c.1554 – October 1603), the son of Richard Waldegrave of Blockley, Worcestershire, was a 16th-century printer and publisher in England and Scotland. From 1578 to 1588 he printed numerous, mainly religious works in London, and from 1590 to 1603, more than 100 books in Scotland. In 1603, following King James I of England's accession to the English throne, he returned to England, but died later the same year.

Waldegrave is chiefly known for printing the first four of the Marprelate tracts on a secret press, and for printing the works of King James I of Scotland in Scotland.

== Family ==
Little is known of Waldegrave's parents. According to the Stationers' Register, his father was Richard Waldegrave, a yeoman from Blockley three miles northwest of Moreton in Marsh, then in Worcestershire, now in Gloucestershire. He died before 1568.

Further information may be gleaned from the will of Thomas Freman, of Blockley, yeoman, which was proved 27 May 1546 by Richard Sambage and Richard Walgrave, two of the four named executors. The text of the will, dated 16 March 1545 (37 Henry VIII) includes the testator's mother-in-law, Margery Walgrave, who receives 20/- (twenty shillings). John Walgrave and Martyn Walgrave are also beneficiaries. In addition Richard Walgrave is assigned the task of oversight of husbandry.

Waldegrave is thought to have married about 1580. His wife's Christian name was Mary, but her surname is unknown. They had six children before Waldegrave arrived in Scotland. A seventh child, Robert, was born in September 1596 in Edinburgh.

== Early career ==
On 24 June 1568 Waldegrave began an eight-year apprenticeship with the London stationer, William Griffith:

Robert Walgrave the sonne of Rychard walgrave late of blacklay in the Countye of Worcestre yeoman Deceassed hath put hym self apprentes to Wylliam greffeth Cetizen and stacioner of London from the feaste of the nativite of saynte John bapteste anno 1568 viij yeres.

Having completed his apprenticeship, Waldegrave should have gained the freedom of the Stationers' Company by 1576; however, as the Company records for that year are lost, there is no record of his having done so. His name first appears in the company's records as a publisher on 17 June 1578, when he became licensed to publish The Castle for the Soule, the first of many religious texts he printed or published during his career.

Waldegrave's principal place of business was "Without Temple Bar in the Strand", near Somerset House, although in 1583 he was located for a short time in Foster Lane. In that year he was recorded as having two presses. In the late 1580s his imprints indicate that he occasionally published from shops at the sign of the Crane in Paul's Churchyard and the sign of the White Horse in Cannon Lane.

He soon became known for printing the works of English clergymen and others who dissented from the established religion, including Dudley Fenner, Laurence Chaderton and John Field. He also published editions of works by continental and Scottish religious reformers, among them Martin Luther, John Calvin and John Knox. During the 1580s he was twice imprisoned in the White Lion prison in Southwark, spending 20 weeks there in 1586–7. In February the following year, a Star Chamber decree restricted his publishing activities. That April, he anonymously printed and published John Udall's The State of the Churche of England Laid Open, or Diotrephes, but on 16 April officers of the Stationers' Company confiscated his press and almost all his type, together with copies of Udall's book. Although he escaped from his house carrying a box of type hidden beneath his cloak, the copies of Udall's book were burned, and his seized press and type destroyed.

== Marprelate tracts ==
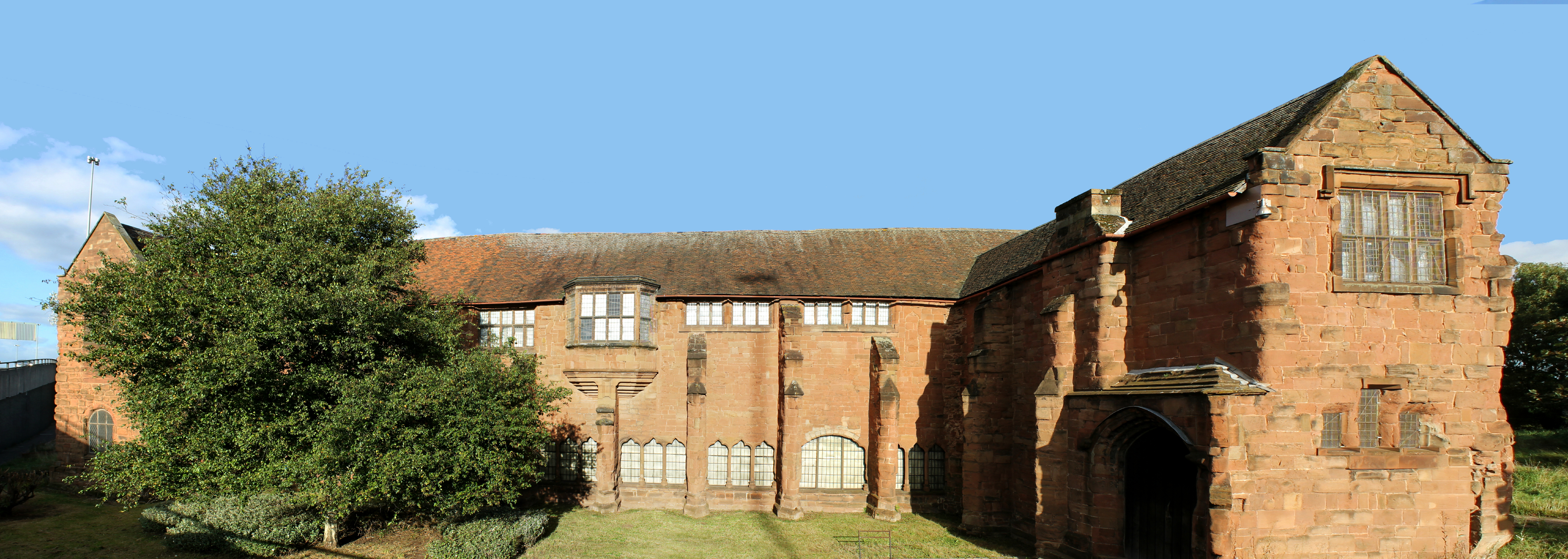
The Whitefriars, Coventry, home of John Hales, where Waldegrave printed the Schoolpoints and Hay Any Work For Cooper on the secret press

Waldegrave hid the salvaged type at the house of Mistress Crane in the parish of St Mary Aldermanbury. Born Elizabeth Hussey, Mistress Crane was the widow of Queen Elizabeth's Cofferer of the Household and Master of the Household, Anthony Crane (d.1583), had reformist sympathies, and in the late spring of 1588 she allowed Waldegrave and John Penry to set up a secret press at her country home at East Molesey, Surrey, across the Thames from Hampton Court Palace. The first tract to be printed there was another of Udall's works, the Demonstration of Discipline. In late 1588 and early 1589, Waldegrave embarked on an even more controversial enterprise, printing the first four tracts written against the ecclesiastical authorities by an unknown satirist using the pseudonym Martin Marprelate. The first of the Marprelate tracts, Martin's Epistle was printed on the secret press in October 1588. The tract enjoyed immense popularity, and the ecclesiastical authorities instigated a hue and cry after Martin. In November the press was moved from East Molesey to Sir Richard Knightley's house at Fawsley in Northamptonshire, where Martin's second tract, The Epitome, was printed. Shortly thereafter the secret press was moved to the Whitefriars, Coventry, the home of Knightley's great-nephew, John Hales, where Certaine Minerall and Metaphysicall Schoolpoints and Hay Any Worke for Cooper were printed, the former in early January and the latter in late March 1589. Waldegrave then refused to print any further tracts, citing the Puritan ministers' disapproval of Martin Marprelate's course of action. Waldegrave had a patron and protector in James VI of Scotland who asked his diplomat Sir Robert Melville of Murdocairny to intercede with Elizabeth for him.

== Scotland ==
Waldegrave's movements in the months immediately after he left the secret press are uncertain; John Penry claimed that he was printing in La Rochelle in May 1589. However, by early 1590 he was in Edinburgh, where by March that year he was granted a licence to print. On 9 October he was appointed King's Printer by James VI. In December the English ambassador Robert Bowes noted that James VI had "planted Waldegrave to be his printer", and he was a near and unwelcome neighbour of Bowes, who was usually lodged with Janet Fockart.

From that point until his death in 1603–4, Waldegrave printed over 100 works, "making him the most prolific Scottish printer of the sixteenth century". His output consisted principally of religious works, but also included William Welwood's The Sea-Law of Scotland, a pirated edition of Sir Philip Sidney's The Arcadia, and three works by King James: the Poetical Exercises (1591), the Daemonologie, The Trew Law, and Basilikon Doron.

In September 1594 Bowes was asked to remonstrate with him for printing a tract Principis Scoti-Britannorum Natalia written by Andrew Melville. Waldegrave claimed not to understand enough Latin to known that work referred to the succession to the crown of England, and called James VI, "King of all Britain". James VI told Bowes that he not read them either. Waldegrave told Bowes that he had declined to print the speech or oration made by David Cunningham, Bishop of Aberdeen, at the baptism of Prince Henry at Stirling Castle, which also referred to the succession.

In February 1597 he suffered a temporary setback when he was convicted of "treasonably printing" an Act of the Scottish Parliament. However, the conviction was later set aside.

When King James acceded to the English crown, following the death of Queen Elizabeth in March 1603, Waldegrave returned to England, leaving his Edinburgh printing business in his wife's care. He obtained a licence to print from the Stationers' Company in June 1603, but died later the same year during an outbreak of the plague and was buried at St Mary Magdalen, Old Fish Street, London, on 22 October. If he left a will, it has not survived.
