= Marprelate Controversy =

Puritan versus Church of England pamphlet "war"

The title page of the Cavaliero Pasquill's "Countercuffe to Martin Junior," 1589, one of the anti-Martinist tracts.

The Marprelate Controversy was a war of pamphlets waged in England and Wales in 1588 and 1589, between a puritan writer who employed the pseudonym Martin Marprelate, and defenders of the Church of England which remained an established church.

== Character and reception ==
Martin's tracts are characterised by mockery of Anglican dignitaries and satire against the corruptions of the Church of England. The style is 'a heady mixture of nonsense, satire, protest, irony and gossip', combined with pungent wit, 'full of the language of the street'. While Martin maintained puritan doctrines as a whole, the special point of his attack was the episcopacy. The pamphlets were printed at a secret press established by John Penry, a Welsh puritan, with the help of the printer Robert Waldegrave, about midsummer 1588, for the issue of puritan literature was forbidden by the authorities.

The first tract by "Martin Marprelate," known as the Epistle, was printed at the home of Mistress Crane at East Molesey in October 1588. Born Elizabeth Hussey, Mistress Crane was the widow of Anthony Crane (d. 16 August 1583), Master of the Queen's Household, and daughter of Sir Robert Hussey (d.1546), younger brother of John Hussey, 1st Baron Hussey of Sleaford. The Epistle is an answer to A Defence of the Government established in the Church of Englande, by Dr John Bridges, Dean of Salisbury, itself a reply to earlier puritan works. Besides attacking the episcopal office in general, it assails certain prelates with much personal abuse. The Epistle attracted considerable notice and a reply was written by Thomas Cooper, Bishop of Winchester, under the title An Admonition to the People of England, but this was too long and too dull to appeal to the same class of readers as the Marprelate pamphlets, and produced little effect.

Penry's press, removed in November to the home of Sir Richard Knightley at Fawsley, near Northampton, then produced a second tract by Martin, the Epitome, which contains more serious argument than the Epistle but is otherwise similar.

Shortly afterward the press was moved to the Whitefriars, Coventry, the home of Knightley's great-nephew, John Hales (d. 1 January 1607/8), and his wife, Frideswide, the daughter of William Faunt. In late January 1589, Martin's Certain Mineral and Metaphysical School-points was printed at the Whitefriars, followed in March by John Penry's View of Some Part of Such Public Wants, and Martin's Hay Any Work For Cooper, a reply to the Admonition. Hales, the son of Christopher Hales and Mary Lucy, daughter of William Lucy, esquire, of Charlecote, was the nephew and heir of John Hales (d.1572).

It now appeared to some of the ecclesiastical authorities that the only way to silence Martin was to have him attacked in his own railing style, and accordingly certain writers of ready wit, among them John Lyly, Thomas Nashe and Robert Greene, were secretly commissioned to answer the pamphlets. Among the productions of this group were Pappe with an Hatchet (Sept. 1589), probably by Lyly, and An Almond for a Parrat (1590), which, with certain tracts under the pseudonym of "the renowned Cavaliero Pasquill", has been attributed to Nashe. Some anti-Martinist plays or shows (now lost) performed in 1589 were perhaps also their work.

Meanwhile, in July 1589, Penry's press, now at Wolston, near Coventry, produced two tracts purporting to be by sons of Martin, but probably by Martin himself, namely, Theses Martinianae by Martin Junior, and The Just Censure of Martin Junior by Martin Senior. Shortly after this, More Work for Cooper, a sequel to Hay any Worke, was begun at Manchester, but while it was in progress the press was seized. Penry however was not found, and in September issued from Wolston or Haseley The Protestation of Martin Mar prelate, the last work of the series, though several of the anti-Martinist pamphlets appeared after this date. He then fled to Scotland, but was later apprehended in London, charged with inciting rebellion, and hanged (May 1593). The authorship of the tracts has been attributed to several persons: to Penry himself, who however emphatically denied it and whose acknowledged works have little resemblance in style to those of Martin; to Sir Michael Hicks (by the historian A.L. Rowse); to Henry Barrow; to Roger Williams; to George Carleton by Kathryn M. Longley and Patrick Collinson; and to the Warwickshire squire and Member of Parliament Job Throckmorton, whom most Marprelate scholars now believe was the primary author with the assistance of Penry.

== See also ==
- Elizabethan Religious Settlement
- Vestments controversy
