= Ephraim Udall =

English Royalist divine

Ephraim Udall (died 24 May 1647) was an English Royalist divine.

Udall was son of John Udall. He was admitted a pensioner of Emmanuel College, Cambridge, in July 1606, proceeded B.A. in 1609, and commenced M.A. in 1614. On 20 Sept. 1615 he was appointed perpetual curate of Teddington. On 27 Nov. 1634 he was presented to the rectory of St Augustine Watling Street, London. For a long time he was regarded as one of the shining lights of the puritan party, but after the breaking out of the great rebellion in 1641 he declared himself to be in favour of episcopacy and the established liturgy. He was, in consequence of this, charged with being popishly affected, and the Long parliament, on 29 June 1643, made an order that he should be ejected from his rectory, and that the rents and profits should be sequestered for Francis Roberts, a 'godly, learned, and orthodox divine'. His house was plundered and his books and furniture were taken away. Afterwards his enemies sought to commit him to prison, and they carried his aged and decrepit wife out of doors by force and left her in the open street. Udall, who is described by Anthony Wood as 'a man of eminent piety, exemplary conversation, profound learning, and indefatigable industry,’ died in London on 24 May 1647. Thomas Reeve preached his funeral sermon, which was published under the title of Lazarus his Rest (London, 1647, 4to).

== Works ==
- Τὸ πρέπον εὐχαριστικόν, i.e. Communion Comlinesse. Wherein is discovered the conveniency of the peoples drawing neere to the Table in the sight thereof when they receive the Lords Supper. With the great unfitnesse of receiving it in Pewes in London for the Novelty of high and close Pewes, London, 1641, 4to.
- (anon.) Good Workes, if they be well handled, or Certaine Projects about Maintenance for Parochiall Ministers, London, 1641, 4to.
- (anon.) Noli me Tangere is a thinge to be thovght on, or Vox carnis sacræ clamantis ab Altari ad Aquilam sacrilegam, Noli me tangere ne te perdam, London, 1642, 4to.
- The Good of Peace and Ill of Warre, London, 1642, 4to.
- (anon.) Directions Propovnded, and humbly presented to … Parliament, concerning the Booke of Common Prayer, and Episcopall Government, Oxford, 1642, 4to. This was also published under the title of The Bishop of Armaghes Direction, concerning the Lyturgy, and Episcopall Government, London, 1642, 4to. The treatise was disavowed by Archbishop Ussher, and the authorship is correctly attributed to Udall.
