= John Udall (Puritan) =

English clergyman

John Udall (also Udal or Uvedale; 1560?–1592) was an English clergyman of Puritan views, closely associated with the publication of the Martin Marprelate tracts, and prosecuted for controversial works of a similar polemical nature. He has been called "one of the most fluent and learned of puritan controversialists".

== Early life ==
He matriculated as a sizar of Christ's College, Cambridge, on 15 March 1578, but soon afterwards migrated to Trinity College. There he graduated B.A. in 1581, and M.A. in 1584. John Penry was an undergraduate friend, and Udall also gained a working knowledge of Hebrew.

Before 1584 Udall took holy orders and became curate of Kingston-upon-Thames under the absentee vicar, Stephen Chatfield. He was soon known there as a preacher and a convinced Puritan doubter of the scriptural justification of episcopacy.

Although he gained a reputation and influential patrons, Udall's insistence on a literal observance of scriptural precepts was held to infringe the orthodoxy of the Church of England and in 1586 he was summoned by Thomas Cooper, bishop of Winchester and William Day, dean of Windsor to appear before the court of high commission at Lambeth. Through the influence of Anne, Countess of Warwick and Sir Drue Drury he was restored to his ministry.

== Diotrephes ==
The group that would launch Marprelate came together around this time. During 1587 Penry seems to have visited Udall at Kingston. The Puritan printer Robert Waldegrave was Penry's friend; it may be that in fact Udall made the introduction, though.

In April 1588 Udall induced Waldegrave to print at his office in London an anonymous and extreme tract in which Udall denounced the Church of England. In this work Diotrephes, named after a minor New Testament character, Udall waxed satirical, and the pamphlet gained public attention. It is close to the model of Anthony Gilby's A pleasaunt dialogue betweene a souldior of Barwicke and an English chaplaine (1581). The character Diotrephes is an anti-Puritan bishop; Udall himself rejected the identification as "Puritan", and the work contains his opinion that the term is from Satan via the papists, while he puts into the mouth of Diotrephes the view that Puritan applies to reformer of church government.

Archbishop John Whitgift and other members of the court of high commission considered Diotrephes seditious. It was soon known to have been printed by Waldegrave, and in April his press was seized. Udall, whose responsibility remained unknown to the authorities, then invited Waldegrave to Kingston to discuss the situation. Penry joined the consultation, with the result that plans were made to disseminate through the country further tracts.

== Genesis of Martin Marprelate ==
Penry soon decided to write a series of attacks on the bishops which should bear the pseudonym of Martin Marprelate. Udall supplied him with information that had come to his knowledge of the illegal practices of the bishop of London, and Penry embodied it in the first of the Martin Marprelate tracts, which was known as The Epistle. John Feild had collated such information, and it is suggested that after Feild's death in 1588 his papers were circulated (against Feild's expressed wishes); Udall may have been a recipient. McGinn has argued that papers of this sort that Udall showed Chatfield, at a date probably before Feild's death, were from Feild.

The details of the Marprelate publications, a well-masked conspiracy, are still subject to some scholarly debate. It is not clear that Udall made other contributions to the series of pamphlets. On the other hand, he was definitely present at some of the printing. He may have had no relation with any of the Marprelate controversialists besides Penry, and perhaps was associated with Penry only at the inception of the scheme. In fact Penry's major collaborator is now thought to have been Job Throckmorton, and the centre of printing moved away to Warwickshire.

== A Demonstration ==
Udall pursued the bishops single-handed. In July 1588 Waldegrave secretly set up a press in the neighbourhood of Kingston, at the house of Elizabeth Crane, widow of Anthony Crane, at East Molesey. There, he printed a second anonymous polemic of Udall, A Demonstration. In it, Udall denounced ‘the supposed governors of the church of England, the archbishops, lord-bishops, archdeacons, and the rest of that order.’ The Demonstration was secretly distributed in November, at the same time as the Epistle, the first of the distinctive Martin Marprelate tracts, which Waldegrave also put into type at the East Molesey press.

In his Demonstration, Udall relies on the New Testament for church polity: his view was that it sets down prescriptively a scheme that is a definite requirement. His Biblical literalism is qualified on the title page, by the words the proofes thereof; out of the scriptures, the euidence of it by the light of reason rightly ruled. He employs there also a homely metaphor that was to have a long history for Puritans: the church is a house, and God the householder. His view was that the post of Archbishop was not scriptural, and neither was ordination except to a given church post. Canon law he qualifies as "filthie" and "monstrous". He added to all this economic views. The Demonstration states that the patronage of livings was a work of Antichrist; and he opposed usury.

Replies to Udall appeared in 1590, one attributed to Matthew Sutcliffe one being an intervention by Anthony Marten in A Reconciliation of All the Pastors and Cleargy of the Church of England. Sutcliffe returned to the attack in 1592 with a justification of Udall's conviction.

== Deprival and time in Newcastle ==
In July 1588, Udall, although his authorship of Diotrephes was hardly suspected, and the Demonstration was as yet unpublished, again offended the court of high commission by uncompromising sermons in the parish church of Kingston. He was summarily deprived of his living.

After a period resting with the intention of leading a private life, he was invited in December by Henry Hastings, 3rd Earl of Huntingdon and the inhabitants of Newcastle-upon-Tyne to resume his preaching there. He accepted the call, for a year. Newcastle was in an area of active Calvinist ministry, with the Scot John Magbray (Mackbury, Mackbrey) vicar at Billingham from 1577 to 1587. Udall lectured there only for a short while, but affected an already polarised religious situation by defining a radical direction. Huntingdon, long serving as the President of the Council of the North, placed as a successor to Udall Richard Holdsworth (father of Richard Holdsworth the academic) who became vicar at St Nicholas, Newcastle, having been taken on as a chaplain in the north by the Earl from 1585, also as a deprived cleric.

== Imprisonment ==
Meanwhile, many Marprelate tracts had been issued in rapid succession, and the bishops made every effort to discover their source. Udall was soon suspected of complicity, and on 29 December 1589 he was summoned to London to be examined by the privy council. He arrived on 9 January 1590, and four days later appeared at a council meeting that was held at the Blackfriars house of William Brooke, 10th Baron Cobham. A very detailed if partisan account of subsequent events is given in volume 2 of John Waddington's Congregational History. For context it states that Udall's initial troubles with the authorities were for holding conventicles; and quotes Udall to the effect that Holdsworth, his successor at Newcastle, was already acting as pastor when he arrived.

Udall was asked whether his ministry at Newcastle was authorised by the bishop of the diocese. He replied that both the bishopric of Durham and the archbishopric of York were vacant during the period of his ministry. He refused to say whether he was the author of the Demonstration and Diotrephes. He acknowledged that Penry had passed through Newcastle three months before, but had merely saluted him at his door. The council ordered Udall's detention in the Gatehouse Prison at Westminster. A second examination by the council followed on 13 July 1590, when similar questions were put to the prisoner and similar answers made by him.

== Courtroom and aftermath ==
On 24 July 1590 Udall was placed on trial at the Croydon assizes, before Justice Robert Clarke and Serjeant John Puckering, on a charge of having published ‘a wicked, scandalous, and seditious libel’ entitled A Demonstration. The indictment was laid under the statute 23 Eliz. 1. c. 3, which was aimed at attacks on the government made in print by Roman Catholics. Udall had Nicholas Fuller as counsel, though he was expelled for protesting the judge's directions to the jury. The prosecution depended on the written depositions previously obtained from witnesses in the high commission court. The judges invited Udall to deny on oath that he was author of the incriminated tract. This he refused to do. He was found guilty, but sentence was deferred, and he was ordered to be imprisoned in the White Lion prison in Southwark. Subsequently, he was offered a pardon if he would sign a recantation, but he declined to accept the terms proposed. In February 1591 he was brought to the bar of the Southwark assizes, and raised some arguments in arrest of judgment. Sentence of death was passed on him, and he was carried back to prison.

No attempt was made to carry out the sentence, but Udall remained a prisoner. Past supporters, who had shown sympathy with Udall's religious views in earlier days, including Sir Walter Ralegh and Robert Devereux, 2nd Earl of Essex, interested themselves on his behalf. Alexander Nowell visited Udall bringing Lancelot Andrewes as his chaplain, on behalf of the privy council; and efforts were made for his release particularly by Nowell.

Udall sued for liberty to go to church; permission was refused him. A copy of the indictment under which he was convicted, but which he had never seen, was sent him. Acting on the advice of friends, he thereupon framed a form of pardon ‘according to the indictment,’ and his wife presented it with his petition to the council. Ralegh intervened, as he had done in other cases of conscience, and a scheme was worked out under which Udall would swear loyalty to the Queen but accept exile.

== Pardon and death ==
The papers were referred to Archbishop Whitgift, agitation in Udall's favour grew, and in March 1592 the governors of the Turkey Company offered to send Udall to Syria as pastor of their agents there if he were released at once. A pardon was signed by the queen early in June. On 15 June Udall, by the archbishop's direction, informed the lord keeper, Puckering, of that fact. But immediately afterwards Udall fell ill and died.

He was buried in the churchyard of St. George's, Southwark. He was survived by his wife and son Ephraim.

== Works ==
Udall published significant works other than the tracts, under his name.

Three volumes of sermons delivered by him at Kingston were published in 1584. The first volume, called Amendment of Life was in three sermons, the second volume was entitled Obedience to the Gospell (two sermons); and the third was entitled Peter's Fall: two Sermons upon the Historie of Peter's denying Christ, London 1584. A fourth collection of five sermons ‘preached in the time of the dearth in 1586,’ was called The true Remedie against Famine and Warres (London, 1586). While at Newcastle Udall published in London, under his own name, a new volume of sermons entitled ‘Combat between Christ and the Devil.’ This was of non-controversial character.

It has been argued that Udall was a significant developer of a style of Puritan Ramist preaching, as detailed charting shows:

The structure of Udall's sermons resembles that of earlier dichotomous sermons by Laurence Chaderton in 1578 and 1584 and Bartholomew Andrewes in 1583.

Also

[...] Udall's paradigm of the sermon explained in A Commentarie vpon the Lamentation of Ieremy became a standard for preaching in England and America.

In the year following Udall's death there appeared at Leyden a Hebrew grammar under the title The Key of the Holy Tongue (Leyden, 1593). The first part consists of a grammar translated from the Latin of Peter Martinius (Pierre Martinez (c.1530-1594) from French Navarre, a sometime pupil of Petrus Ramus); the second part supplies exercises on Psalms xxv. and lxv., and the third part is a short dictionary of the Hebrew words of the Bible. The Jewish Encyclopedia notes it as one of the first Hebrew grammars in a living European language, with the one in Italian by Guglielmo dei Franchi, Sole della Lingua Sancta (1591). The work was prized by James VI of Scotland, who reportedly asked for Udall on his arrival in England in 1603, and, on learning that he was dead, to have exclaimed, ‘By my soul, then, the greatest scholar of Europe is dead.’

In 1593 also appeared (anonymously in London) the first edition of Udall's Commentarie on the Lamentations of Jeremy; other editions are dated 1595, 1599, and 1637. A Dutch translation by J. Lamstium is dated 1660. Udall's Certaine Sermons, taken out of severall Places of Scripture, which was issued in 1596, is a reprint of his Amendment of Life and Obedience to the Gospel. Erroneously attributed to him, according to Sidney Lee in the Dictionary of National Biography is an antipapal tract, An Antiquodlibet, or an Advertisement to beware of Secular Priests, Middelburg, 1602; it is now attributed to Dudley Fenner.

Dedicatees

Udall's extensive network of patrons is partially indicated by his book dedications. These include:

- Charles Howard, 2nd Baron Howard of Effingham in Amendment of Life (1584).
- Francis Russell, 2nd Earl of Bedford in Peter's Fall (1584).
- Ambrose Dudley, 3rd Earl of Warwick in The true Remedie against Famine and Warres (1586).
- Henry Hastings, 3rd Earl of Huntingdon, Combat between Christ and the Devil.

== Notes ==
Attribution

This article incorporates text from a publication now in the public domain: Lee, Sidney, ed. (1899). "Udall, John". Dictionary of National Biography. Vol. 58. London: Smith, Elder & Co.
