= Pasquill (the Cavaliero) =

The title page of Pasquill's "Countercuffe to Martin Junior," 1589.

Pasquill ("the renowned Cavaliero") is the pseudonym adopted by a defender of the Anglican hierarchy in an English political and theological controversy of the 1580s known as the "Marprelate controversy" after "Martin Marprelate", the nom de plume of a Puritan critic of the Anglican establishment. The names of Pasquill and his friend "Marforius", with whom he has a dialogue in the second of the tracts issued in his name, are derived from those of "Pasquino" (in Latin Pasquillus) and "Marforio", the two most famous of the talking statues of Rome, where from the early 16th century on it was customary to paste up anonymous notes or verses commenting on current affairs and scandals.

== Tracts ==
Three tracts critical of Martin Marprelate were issued under the name of Pasquill in 1589 and 1590:

- A Countercuffe Given to Martin Junior (1600 words), dated Aug 6 or 8, 1589 "from Gravesend Barge" – a customary point of departure from London to the Continent or Mediterranean
- The Return of Pasquill (otherwise Pasquill and Marforius) (9600 words) with a postscript "from London Stone" dated Oct 20, 1589
- The First Part of Pasquill's Apology (8300 words), dated July 2, 1590

== Attribution ==
The three tracts were attributed to Thomas Nashe. However, Ronald McKerrow, the leading Nashe scholar of the early 20th century, in 1910 expressed strong doubts about the attribution. Although he included the tracts in his definitive Works of Thomas Nashe, he conceded not only that "external evidence of Nashe's authorship...is of the vaguest" but that "against the attribution, there is internal evidence which seems to me to be of far more weight than the external evidence for it." Another possible author is Anthony Munday, who, like Nashe, was apparently active as an anti-Martinist agent. This attribution has not received widespread support.

== See also ==
- Pasquinade
