= Job Throckmorton =

Job Throckmorton (Throkmorton) (1545–1601) was a Puritan English religious pamphleteer and Member of Parliament during the reign of Queen Elizabeth I. Possibly with John Penry and John Udall, he authored the Martin Marprelate anonymous anti-clerical satires; scholarly consensus now makes him the main author.

== Life ==
Throckmorton was of the Warwickshire gentry, resident at Haseley, the son of a land-owning Member of Parliament, Clement Throckmorton, and nephew of the influential diplomat Sir Nicholas Throckmorton. He was educated at Queen's College, Oxford, graduating in 1566.

He served as Member of Parliament for East Retford from 1572 to 1583, and Member of Parliament for Warwick from 1586–87 (Queen Elizabeth I's 4th and 6th parliaments, respectively). In 1587 Throckmorton and Edward Dunn Lee presented to Parliament a petition of John Penry, on preaching in Wales. It caused Penry to be arrested by John Whitgift.

The seven Marprelate pamphlets appeared late in 1588. Leland Carlson has argued strongly for Throckmorton as the sole author. This was not universally agreed-upon; for example, author Ritchie Kendall suggested that at least some of the Marprelate pamphlets could have been the work of a committee of authors. However, in more recent years, scholarly consensus has more or less emerged that Throckmorton was the primary author. For example, Joseph Black asserted in his annotated edition of the pamphlets that Throckmorton was the primary author, assisted by Penry.

Throkmorton's pamphlets Master Some laid open in his colours and A Dialogue in which is plainely laid open the tyrannical dealing of the Lord Bishopps were printed in La Rochelle in 1589. The former was a reply to Robert Some, author of A Godly Treatise ... Touching the Ministerie, Sacraments, and the Church, who in 1589 became Master of Peterhouse, Cambridge. In 1590 Throckmorton was held on a treason charge, which he escaped narrowly.

He was attacked by Matthew Sutcliffe, Dean of Exeter in An answere to a certaine libel supplicatorie (1592), as a Marprelate author. His denial appeared in 1594 as The Defence of Job Throkmorton, against the slaunders of Maister Sutcliffe, and the controversy continued. Towards the end of his life he was close to John Dod, and moved to Canons Ashby.

== Works ==
- Marprelate Pamphlets (suspected author), Warwickshire
1. Oh Read Over Dr. John Bridges – The Epistle (October 1588)
2. Oh Read Over Dr. John Bridges – The Epitome (November 1588)
3. Certain Mineral and Metaphysical Schoolpoints (20 February 1589)
4. Hay any Work for Cooper (March 1589)
5. Theses Martinianæ (22 July 1589)
6. The Just Censure and Reproof of Martin Junior (29 July 1589)
7. The Protestation of Martin Marprelate (September 1589)
- Master Some laid open in his colours (La Rochelle, 1589)
- A Dialogue in which is plainely laid open the tyrannical dealing of the Lord Bishopps (La Rochelle, 1589)
- (Suspected author) A Petition directed to her Most Excellent Majestie, wherein Is Delivered 1. A Meane Howe to Compound the Civill Dissention in the Church of England. 2. A Proofe that They Who Write for Reformation Doe Not Offend against the Statute of 23 Elizabeth, c. [2], and Therefore till Matters Bee Compounded, DeserveMore favour (Middelburg, 1592)
- The Defence of Job Throkmorton, against the slaunders of Maister Sutcliffe (1594)
