= William Welwod =

William Welwod (fl. 1578–1622) was a Scottish jurist who was the first to formulate the laws of the sea in an insular Germanic language.

He was a professor of civil law at the University of St Andrews until 1611, when he resigned his chair and moved to England.

== Works ==
Welwod is primarily known for his writings opposing Dutch jurist Hugo Grotius' concept of Mare Liberum (the freedom of the seas), the idea that the seas and oceans were free for all to use and not the property of anyone. Welwod used Biblical texts to argue that in some cases nations could claim exclusive national rights over territorial waters.

Welwod wrote a Scots language treatise on the law of the sea, The sea-law of Scotland, published in 1590 by Robert Waldegrave – 'the earliest book of maritime jurisprudence'. Welwod stated in the preface that the book was aimed at Scottish mariners and merchants. It was written in a vernacular style, and presented the sea law in the form of simple rules. Welwod later reworked The sea-law of Scotland into An Abridgement of All Sea-Lawes (1613), which included a chapter arguing against Hugo Grotius' Mare Liberum. He later expanded this chapter, "Of the Community and Propriety of the Seas", into a full work entitled De dominio maris (1615).

Welwod's main concern was that Grotius' theories could be used to justify the large-scale herring fishing in Scottish waters by Dutch fleets which, according to Welwod, had caused a collapse in the fishing industry along the Scottish east coast.

Hugo Grotius responded to Welwod's critique by writing Defensio capitis quinti Maris Liberi oppugnati a Gulielmo Welwodo ("Defense of the fifth chapter of Mare Liberum, opposed by William Welwod"). The work was written around 1615 but not published until 1872. In this work, Grotius complained that Welwod had misunderstood his treatise as an attempt to justify Dutch fishing in Scottish waters, when it was in fact primarily intended to argue for the Dutch right to trade with the East Indies.
