= Wolston Priory =

Benedictine priory in Warwickshire, England

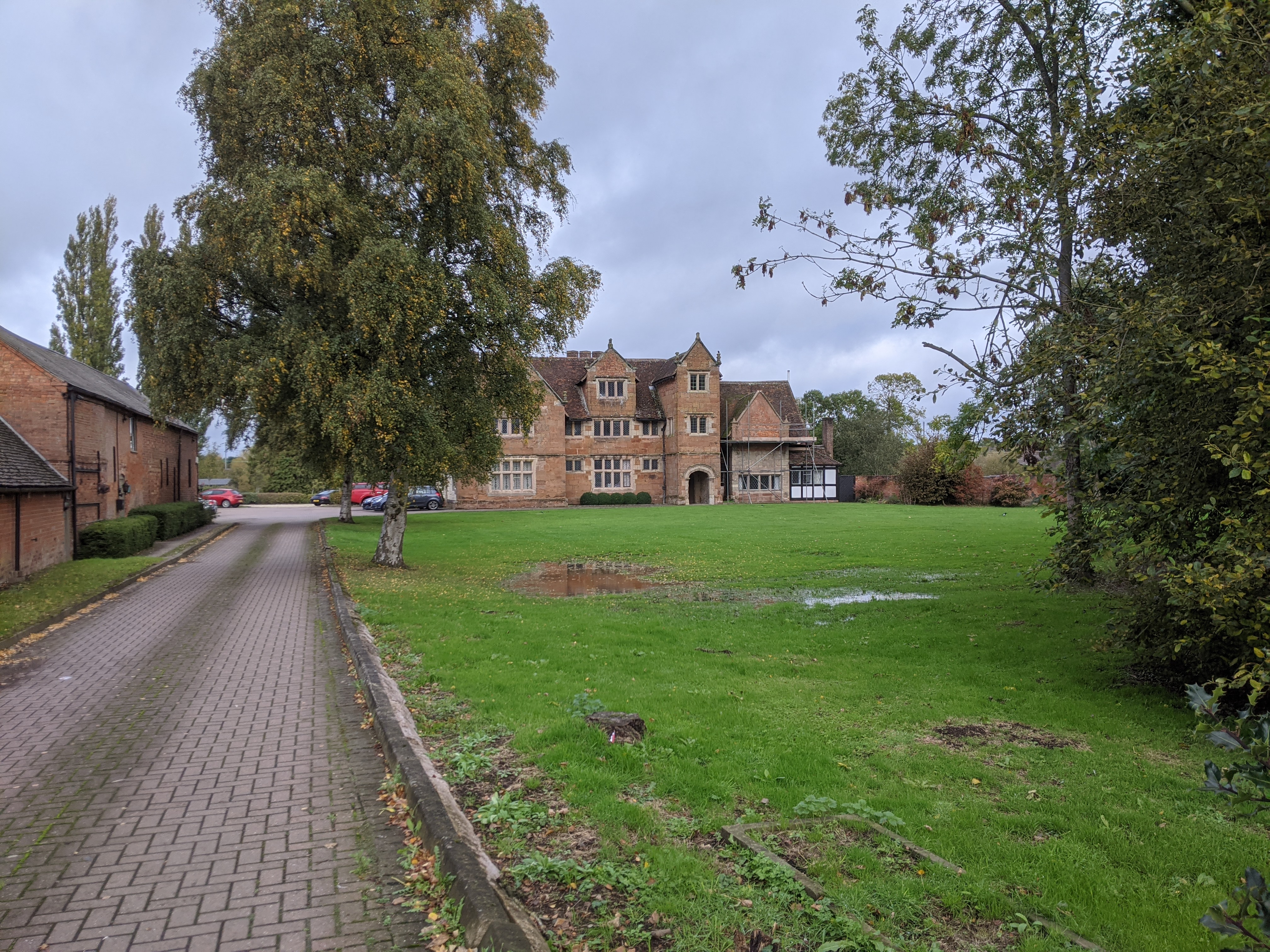
- Interactive map of Wolston Priory
- Location: Priory Road, Wolston, Warwickshire, England
- Coordinates: 52.37954°N 1.39026°W

Listed Building – Grade II*
- Official name: The Priory
- Designated: 4 December 1951
- Reference no.: 1365082

Scheduled monument
- Official name: Wolston priory and moated site
- Designated: 20 December 1957
- Reference no.: 1007721

Wolston Priory was a Benedictine priory near Wolston in Warwickshire, England. The earthwork remains of the priory are a Scheduled Ancient Monument. A present grade II* listed house is based on the remains of the rectory.

The priory was established between 1086 and 1194 on land granted by Hubert Boldran to the Benedictine Abbey of St-Pierre-sur-Dives in Sees, France. It was of a modest size and run down by 1388 and by 1394 was transferred to the Carthusians at Coventry. After the Dissolution it was purchased by Roger Wigston, who was probably responsible for the renovation of the rectory building as a dwelling house.

In this house, known now as Priory Farm, some of the Martin Marprelate tracts attacking the episcopacy of the Anglican Church were secretly printed in a cellar. The building remained in the Wigston family until Roger Wigston's death in 1608, when the property was inherited by his grandson, Sir Peter Wentworth. Sold in the 18th century by the descendants of Fisher Wentworth, it was later acquired by the Wilcox family who retained it until c. 1926.

The house is built in red sandstone ashlar with a clay tiled roof and incorporates timber framing from the 16th century. A central two storey block with a tall gabled dormer is flanked by a three-storey chamber block and west wing.
