= John Penry =

Welsh protestant martyr (1563–1593)

John Penry (1563 – 29 May 1593) was executed for high treason during the reign of Queen Elizabeth I. He is Wales' most famous Protestant Separatist martyr.

== Early life ==
Penry was born in Brecknockshire, Wales; Cefn Brith, a farm near Llangammarch, is traditionally recognised as his birthplace. His parents were Meredydd (Meredith) Penry and Eleanor (nee Godley). He matriculated at Peterhouse, Cambridge, in December 1580, being then probably a Roman Catholic, but soon became a Protestant, with strong Puritan tendencies. Having graduated B.A., he moved to St Alban Hall, Oxford, and gained his M.A. in July 1586. He did not seek ordination, but was licensed as university preacher.

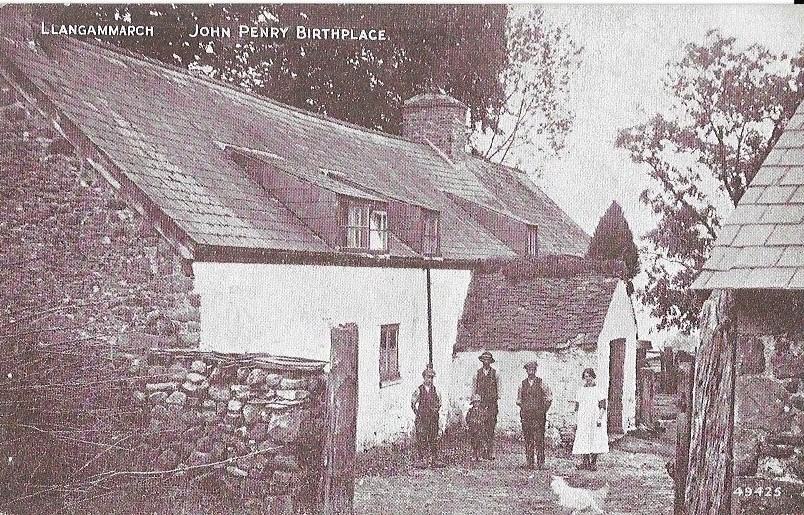
Old photograph of Cefn Brith

== Career ==
There is not much evidence for his preaching tours in Wales; they could only have been made during a few months of 1586 or the autumn of 1587. In 1562 an act of Parliament had made provision for translating the Bible into Welsh, and the New Testament was issued in 1567; but the number printed would barely supply a copy for each parish church. Indignant at this failure, Penry published early in 1587 The Æquity of an Humble Supplication "in the behalf of the country of Wales, that some order may be taken for the preaching of the Gospel among those people". Archbishop John Whitgift, angry at the implied criticism, had him brought before the High Commission and imprisoned for about a month.

On his release Penry married a lady of Northampton and lived there for some years. With the assistance of Sir Richard Knightley, he set up a printing press, which for nearly a year from Michaelmas 1588 was in active operation. It was successively located at East Moulsey (Surrey), Fawsley (Northamptonshire), Coventry and other places in Warwickshire, and finally at Manchester, where it was seized in August 1589. On it were printed Penry's Exhortation to the governours and people of Wales, and View of... such publike wants and disorders as are in the service of God... in Wales; as well as the celebrated Martin Marprelate tracts.

In January 1590, his house at Northampton was searched and his papers seized, but he succeeded in escaping to Scotland. There he published several tracts, as well as a translation of a learned theological work known as Theses Genevenses.

== Return to England and death ==
Returning to England in September 1592, he joined the separatist, or Brownist, congregation in London, in which he declined to take office, though after the arrest of ministers Francis Johnson and John Greenwood, he seems to have been the regular preacher. He was arrested in March 1593 following his recognition by the local vicar at Ratcliff and imprisoned in Poultry Compter while efforts were made to find some pretext for a capital charge.

Failing this a charge of sedition was based on the rough draft of a petition to Queen Elizabeth I that had been found among his private papers; the language was harsh and offensive, but had been neither presented nor published. He was convicted by the Queen's Bench on 21 May 1593, and hanged at St Thomas-a-Watering on 29 May at the unusual hour of 4 p.m., without being granted permission to see his wife, Eleanor, or their four young daughters, Deliverance, Comfort, Safety and Sure-Hope before his death. The signature of his old enemy Whitgift was the first of those affixed to the death warrant.
