= Martin Marprelate =

Name used by anti-episcopal author(s) in the late 1500s

Martin Marprelate (sometimes printed as Martin Mar-prelate and Marre–Martin) was the name used by the anonymous author or authors of the seven Marprelate tracts that circulated illegally in England in the years 1588 and 1589. Their principal focus was an attack on the episcopacy of the Anglican Church.

== Background ==
In 1583, the appointment of John Whitgift as Archbishop of Canterbury had signalled the beginning of a drive against the Presbyterian movement in the church, and an era of censorship began. In 1586, by an edict of the Star Chamber, the archbishop was empowered to license and control all of the printing apparatus in the country.

== Identity and authorship ==
The true identity of "Martin" was for a long time the subject of speculation. For many years, the main candidate was John Penry, a Welsh preacher and author of several impassioned polemics against the state of the church. Renaissance historian John Dover Wilson posited, in his 1912 book Martin Marprelate and Shakespeare's Fluellen, the Welsh soldier Roger Williams was the author of the first three tracts signed "Martin Prelate", with Penry authoring the subsequent tracts signed "Martin Junior" and the Warwickshire squire and Member of Parliament Job Throckmorton the author of those signed "Martin Senior". In 1981 Leland Carlson argued for the authorship of Job Throckmorton. Kathryn M. Longley and Patrick Collinson suggested George Carleton. Henry M. Dexter argued for Henry Barrow.

Recent scholarship, the most authoritative and exhaustive being Joseph Black's The Martin Marprelate Tracts: A Modernized and Annotated Edition, has established that Throckmorton was the main author, assisted by Penry.

The tracts had to be printed in secrecy, and some sort of organisation was involved to handle their production and distribution. Penry was definitely involved in the printing, and the press was frequently relocated to different parts of the country to avoid the authorities. Penry himself denied any involvement in the actual authorship.

== Official reaction ==
The government was concerned enough at the virulence of the attacks on the ecclesiastical hierarchy to respond in kind, hiring professional writers such as Thomas Nashe, Robert Greene and John Lyly to write counter-tracts. The tracts are invectives against the episcopacy and sometimes described the bishops as representing the Antichrist. The most prolific and effective of the anti-Martinists went by the colourful sobriquet, "the renowned Cavaliero Pasquill". Pasquill was traditionally believed to have been Thomas Nashe, however R. B. McKerrow, the editor of Nashe's complete works refutes this: "further study led me to suspect – indeed, to feel almost certain – that Nashe had nothing to do with them (anti-Marprelates texts)." Francis Bacon also involved himself in the pamphleteering, writing An Advertisement Touching the Controversies of the Church of England in 1589, a piece which did not leave the bishops free from criticism.

Some scholars, notably Arul Kumuran, have argued Robert Greene's later works were influenced by the Marprelate pamphlets, though Greene is noted as an anti-Martinist author.

== Later influence and interpretation ==
Some of the Marprelate pamphlets were reprinted in the seventeenth century, and an extensive scholarship has commented on their historical and literary significance. The anti-Martinist literature, including the Pasquill pamphlets, by contrast, has suffered from relative neglect by scholars of early modern England.

During the English civil war, Leveller pamphleteer Richard Overton embraced Marprelate's legacy by publishing several tracts as "Martin Marpriest", purportedly Martin Marprelate's son.

The Marprelate tracts are important documents in the history of English satire: critics from C. S. Lewis to John Carey have recognised their originality. In particular, the pamphlets show concern with the status of the text, wittily pastiching conventions such as the colophon and marginalia.

== See also ==
- Elizabethan Religious Settlement
- Religion in the United Kingdom
