= Isham (surname) =

Isham is a surname. Notable people with the surname include:

- Isham Baronets of Lamport Hall in the County of Northamptonshire, including:
  - Sir John Isham, 1st Baronet (1582–1651)
  - Sir Justinian Isham, 2nd Baronet (1610–1675)
  - Sir Thomas Isham, 3rd Baronet (1656–1681)
  - Sir Justinian Isham, 4th Baronet (1658–1730)
  - Sir Justinian Isham, 5th Baronet (1687–1737)
  - Sir Edmund Isham, 6th Baronet (1690–1772)
  - Sir Justinian Isham, 7th Baronet (1740–1818)
  - Sir Charles Edmund Isham, 10th Baronet (1819–1903)
  - Sir Gyles Isham, 12th Baronet (1903–1976)
- Ashley Isham (b. 1976), fashion designer
- Charles Bradford Isham (1853–1919), American historian
- Christopher Isham (b. 1944), theoretical physicist
- Edmund Isham (1744?–1817), administrator at the University of Oxford
- Elizabeth Isham (c.1608–1654), English writer
- Euseby Isham, Rector of Lincoln College, Oxford
- Frederic S. Isham (1865–1922), American novelist and playwright
- Heyward Isham (1926–2009), international negotiator
- John Isham (disambiguation), several people
- John William Isham (1866–1902), American vaudeville impresario
- Mamie Lincoln Isham (1896–1938), granddaughter of Abraham Lincoln
- Mark Isham (b. 1951), American musician
- Mary Isham, wife of William Randolph
- Norman Isham (1864–1943), American architectural historian
- Samuel Isham (1855–1914), American painter
- Wayne Isham (b. 1958), video director
- Willard W. Isham (1820–1876), American politician
- William Bradley Isham (1827–1909), American banker
- Zacheus Isham (1651–1705), British clergyman and religious author

== Places ==
- Isham, village in Northamptonshire, England
- Isham, Tennessee, unincorporated community, United States
