= Justinian Isham (disambiguation) =

Sir Justinian Isham, 2nd Baronet was an English scholar and Royalist politician.

Justinian Isham may also refer to:

- Sir Justinian Isham, 4th Baronet (1658-1730), MP for Northampton, Northamptonshire; of the Isham baronets
- Sir Justinian Isham, 5th Baronet (1687-1737), MP for Northamptonshire; of the Isham baronets
- Sir Justinian Isham, 7th Baronet (1740-1818), of the Isham baronets
- Sir Justinian Isham, 8th Baronet (1773-1845), of the Isham baronets
- Sir Justinian Vere Isham, 9th Baronet (1816-1846), of the Isham baronets
