= Isham (disambiguation) =

Isham is a village and civil parish in Northamptonshire, England.

Isham or ISHAM may also refer to:

- Isham (surname)
- Isham (given name)
- Isham baronets, a title in the Baronetage of England
- Isham, Saskatchewan, Canada, a community
- Isham, Tennessee, United States, an unincorporated community
- ISHAM, the International Society for Human and Animal Mycology
