= Edmund Isham =

Edmund Isham may refer to:

- Edmund Isham (academic administrator), vice-chancellor of Oxford University
- Sir Edmund Isham, 6th Baronet, British politician
