= Sir Thomas Isham, 3rd Baronet =

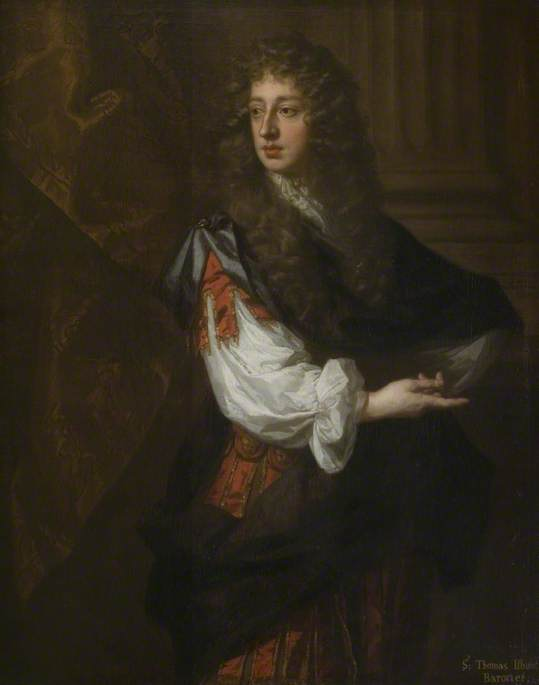
Sir Thomas Isham II, by Mary Beale

Sir Thomas Isham, 3rd Baronet of Lamport (15 March 1656/57 – 26 July 1681) is known for a diary he wrote from 1671 to 1673 of his observations as a member of the English aristocracy.

== Life ==
Thomas Isham II, the eldest son and second child of Sir Justinian Isham I and his wife Vere Leigh, was born on 15 March 1656/57 in Northamptonshire. When his father died on 2 March 1675, Thomas succeeded at 19 years of age to the baronetcy of Lamport, Northamptonshire. He matriculated at Christ Church, Oxford that June, three months after becoming baronet, but he would have only been able to spend a few months at most in his studies, as he embarked in October of the following year on a tour of Europe with his cousin and tutor the Reverend Zacchaeus Isham. Though it was not uncommon for the young English gentry of the time to tour the continent for several months as part of their education, Sir Thomas and Zacchaeus stayed a full two and a half years, a large part of their time spent in Italy collecting art works.

Returning to Lamport, Sir Thomas contracted to marry Mary van de Bempde, the daughter of a Dutch merchant, but he died of smallpox in London on 26 July 1681 before his marriage could take place. He was buried several days later on 9 August in Lamport, and succeeded in the baronetcy by his younger brother Sir Justinian Isham, who became the 4th baronet.

== Diary ==
Sir Thomas is remembered mainly for a diary that he wrote in Latin from 1671 to 1673 at the command of his father. It is made up largely of one-sentence entries, with occasional longer anecdotes of local newsworthy events, as relayed to the boy by visitors. His diary is noteworthy in that it provides a glimpse of the everyday life of a teenage member of the English gentry, as played out in a country estate. His diary first became widely available in 1875 when it was first published, but the most readily available edition is a 1971 publication of a translation by Norman Marlow with annotations by the 12th baronet Sir Gyles Isham.

A portrait of Sir Thomas Isham painted about 1675 by Sir Peter Lely, about the time Thomas became baronet, hangs at Lamport Hall, and there is a reduced copy of Lely's work by Mary Beale.

== See also ==
- Zacheus Isham

== Notes ==
Baronetage of England
| Preceded by Justinian Isham | Baronet (of Lamport); 1675–1681 | Succeeded by Justinian Isham |
