= Sir Justinian Isham, 7th Baronet =

Sir Justinian Isham Bt
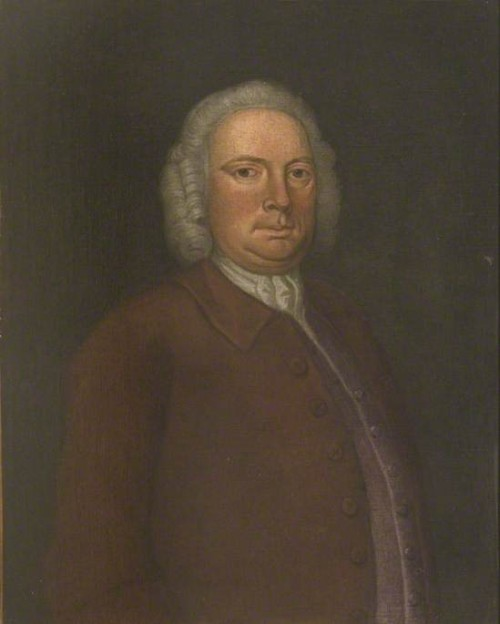
- Sir Justinian Isham IV, 7th Baronet of Lamport
- Born: 8 July 1740
- Died: 1 April 1818 (aged 77)

Sir Justinian Isham IV (8 July 1740 – 1 April 1818) was the 7th Baronet of Lamport and served in 1776 as High Sheriff of Northamptonshire.

== Early life and education ==
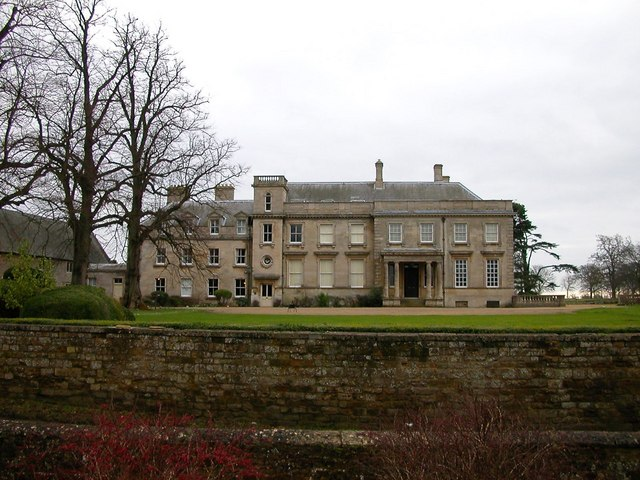
Lamport Hall, Isham, Norfolk

Justinian Isham IV was born probably at Oxford, to Euseby Isham, the Vice-Chancellor of Oxford University and his wife Elizabeth (Mary) Panting. He was educated at John Roysse's Free School in Abingdon, (now Abingdon School) and later was honorary Master of Arts and Bachelor of Laws at Lincoln College, Oxford.

== Baronetcy ==
He succeeded in 1772 to the baronetcy of Lamport and Lamport Hall on the death of his uncle Sir Edmund Isham. He then served in 1776 as High Sheriff of Northamptonshire. On 18 February 1793, he was appointed a deputy lieutenant of Northamptonshire, and died at the age of 77 years. A painting of him by an unknown artist hangs at Lamport Hall.

Sir Justinian was married on 9 September 1766 to Susannah Barrett (1744–1823), the daughter of Henry Barrett. They had several children including those who follow.

- Susannah Isham (1767–1849) married George Purcas Brietzcke (c.1778–1817) of the Secretary of States office for the Northern and Southern Territories. He was the son of Charles Brietzcke (d. 1795), who is known for his diary.
- Sir Justinian Isham (1773–1845) became the 8th Baronet of Lamport.
- Reverend Vere Isham (1774–1845) became Rector of Lamport, Northamptonshire.
- Reverend Henry Charles Isham (1777–1833) became Rector of Shangton, Leicestershire. The baronetcy passed to his descendants in 1976 when the 12th Baronet Sir Gyles Isham died without an heir.

Baronetage of England
Preceded by Edmund Isham	Baronet (of Lamport); 1772–1818	Succeeded by Justinian Isham
Honorary titles
Preceded by John Clarke of Bulwick	High Sheriff of Northamptonshire; 1776	Succeeded by Robert Andrew of Harleston

== See also ==
- List of Old Abingdonians
