= Church of All Saints, Lamport =

Church in Northamptonshire, England

Coordinates: 52.3638°N 0.8881°W

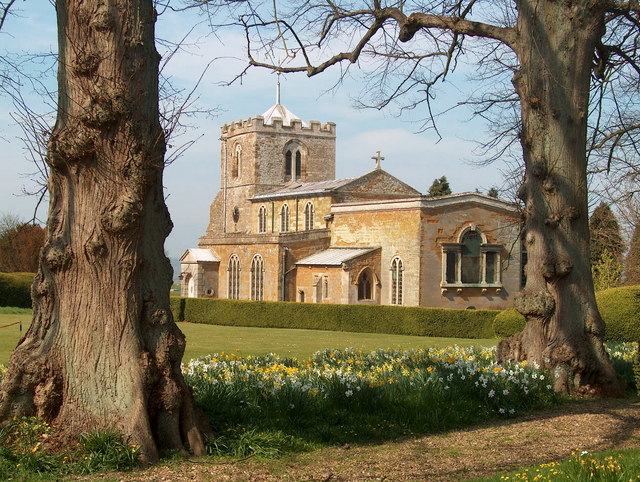
- Church of All Saints, Lamport
- Denomination: Church of England
- Website: http://www.faxtongroup.org.uk/allsaintslamport.htm

Administration
- Province: Canterbury
- Diocese: Diocese of Peterborough
- Archdeaconry: Northampton
- Deanery: Brixworth

Clergy
- Rector: Rev Canon Mary Garbutt

The Church of All Saints is the Church of England parish church of Lamport, Northamptonshire. It is a Grade I listed building and stands on the north side of the High Street.

There is no reference to a church or priest in the entry for the parish in the Domesday Book, which was compiled in 1086. This may indicate the absence of a church building at that stage or, alternatively, only the absence of a resident priest.

The building was first erected in the 12th and 13th centuries. It has a medieval tower but the remainder was rebuilt and added to in the 17th, 18th and 19th centuries. The church contains monuments to members of the Isham family who lived at Lamport Hall from 1560 to 1976. The north chapel dates from 1672. The chancel was rebuilt and aisles built from 1737 onwards. The chancel and south porch are by Francis Smith of Warwick (or his family). The vestry, which dates from 1879 was designed by G. F. Bodley. A detailed description appears on the Historic England website.

The parish registers survive from 1587 and, apart from those currently in use, are kept at Northamptonshire Record Office. Details of its location and opening times can be found on the Record Office website.

Lamport is part of a united benefice of nine parishes: Arthingworth, Draughton, East Farndon, Great Oxendon, Harrington, Lamport with Faxton and Hanging Houghton, and Maidwell. Apart from Faxton, each of these parishes retains its own church building. Faxton church was demolished in 1958; a wall monument to Hester Raynsford (died 1763) from Faxton was installed in Lamport church and a silver cup and paten of 1670 was also transferred to Lamport.
