= Sir Justinian Isham, 5th Baronet =

British Tory politician

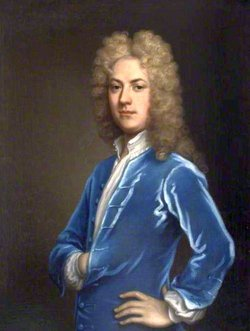
Sir Justinian Isham III by Hugh Howard

Sir Justinian Isham, 5th Baronet (20 July 1687 – 5 March 1737), of Lamport, Northamptonshire was a British Tory politician who sat in the House of Commons from 1730 to 1734.

== Early life ==
Isham was born on 20 July 1687 to Sir Justinian Isham, 4th Baronet of Lamport, Northamptonshire and his wife Elizabeth Turnor. After the Tory victory at the 1710 British general election, he was given a place as Commissioner of leather duties and land taxes worth £500 a year in 1711, which he lost when the Whigs returned to power in 1714. In 1719 he went to Italy while the Pretender was there and received letters from his father warning him to take care how he behaved because there were court spies there. He married Mary Hacket, daughter of Lisle Hacket of Moxhull, Warwickshire on 11 September 1725. On the death of his father on 13 May 1730, he became Baronet of Lamport and inherited the family manor house of Lamport Hall.

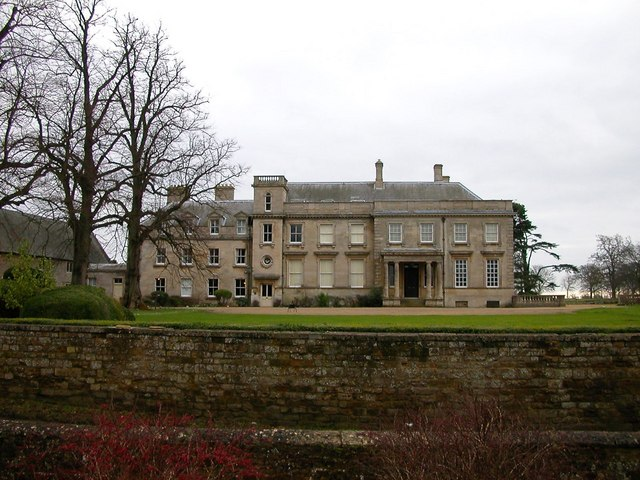
Lamport Hall

== Career ==
Isham was narrowly elected Member of Parliament for Northamptonshire against a Whig opponent at a by-election on 21 May 1730. He voted faithfully with the Tory party. He was returned unopposed to Parliament at the 1734 British general election.

== Death and legacy ==
Isham died without issue, suddenly, on 5 March 1737, probably from a stroke or heart attack, and was buried in the Church of All Saints, Lamport with his monument being sculpted by Peter Scheemakers.

He was succeeded as baronet by his younger brother Edmund Isham, who also followed him as the Northamptonshire representative to Parliament. There is a painting of Sir Justinian by Hugh Howard that hangs at Lamport Hall.

== Notes ==
Parliament of Great Britain
Preceded by Sir Justinian Isham, Bt; Thomas Cartwright	Member of Parliament for Northamptonshire; 1730–1737; With: Thomas Cartwright	Succeeded by Sir Edmund Isham, Bt; Thomas Cartwright
Baronetage of England
Preceded by Justinian Isham	Baronet (of Lamport); 1730–1737	Succeeded by Edmund Isham
