= Sir Edmund Isham, 6th Baronet =

British politician

Sir Edmund Isham Bt
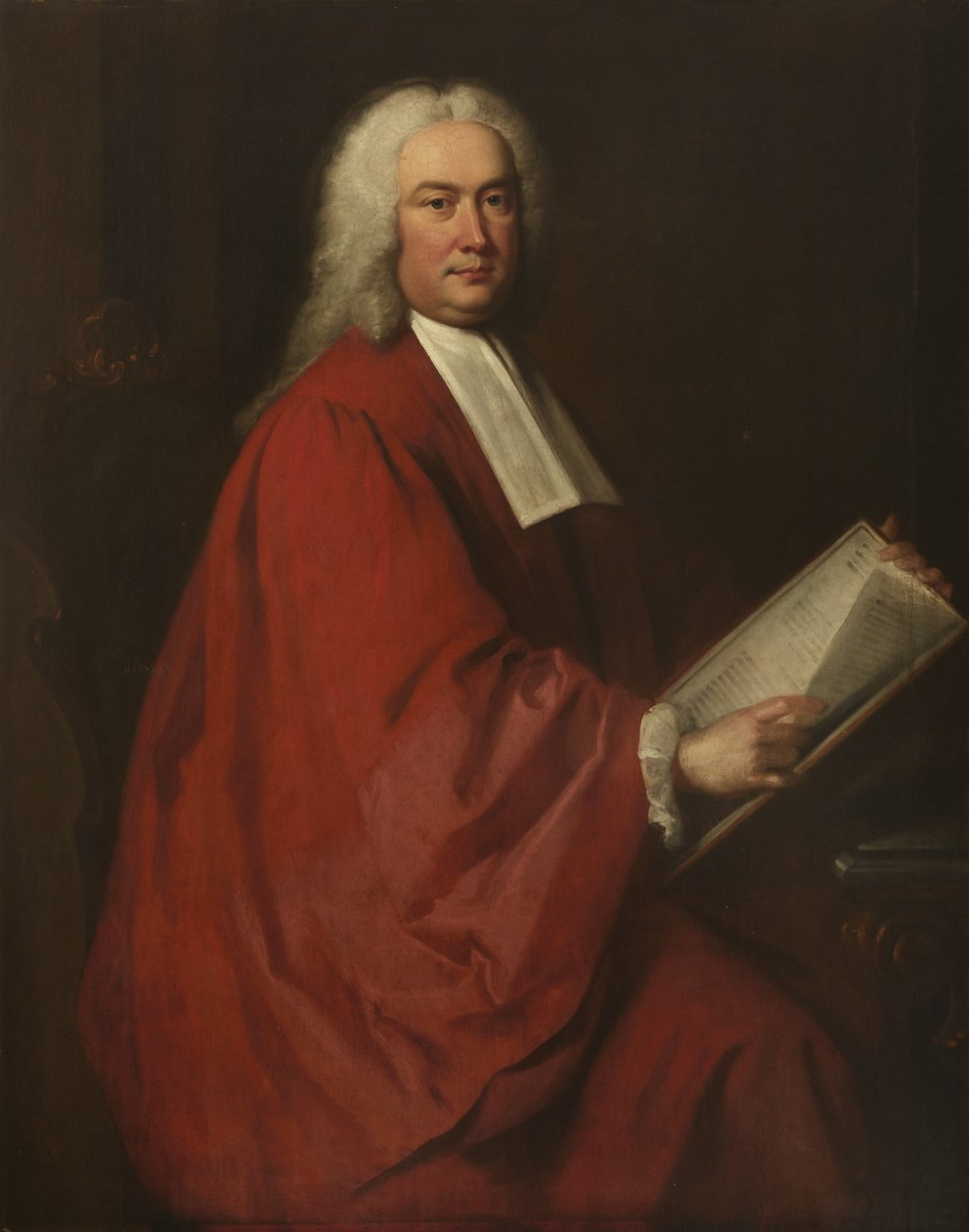
- Portrait by Thomas Hudson

Member of Parliament for Northamptonshire
- In office 1737–1772
- Preceded by: Sir Justinian Isham; Thomas Cartwright
- Succeeded by: Lucy Knightley; Sir William Dolben

Personal details
- Born: 18 December 1690
- Died: 15 December 1772 (aged 81)
- Education: Rugby School; Wadham College, Oxford

Sir Edmund Isham, 6th Baronet (18 December 1690 – 15 December 1772) was a British Tory politician for several successive terms during the reigns of Kings George II and George III of Great Britain.

== Biography ==
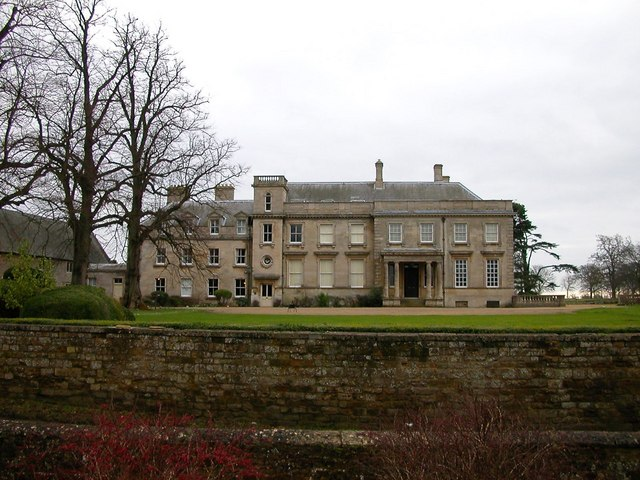
Lamport Hall, Isham, Norfolk

Edmund Isham was born on 18 December 1690 to Sir Justinian Isham, 4th Baronet of Lamport, Northamptonshire and his wife Elizabeth Turnor. He was educated at Rugby School and Wadham College, Oxford and embarked on a legal career, becoming an advocate in Doctors' Commons (1724) and a judge advocate in the Court of Admiralty (1731–41).

He unexpectedly became Baronet of Lamport on 5 March 1737 when his older brother Justinian died young. He was easily elected a few weeks later on 31 March 1737 to his brother's seat in Parliament as the Tory Member of Parliament for Northamptonshire, and ran unopposed each successive term after that for the rest of his life. He also inherited the family seat of Lamport Hall.

He died on 15 December 1772. Although he had married twice he left no children and was therefore succeeded as baronet by his nephew Justinian Isham, the son of his younger brother, the Reverend Euseby Isham. There is a painting of Sir Edmund by Thomas Hudson hanging at Lamport Hall.

Isham was mistakenly described as the leader of the Tories in the 1761 British general election in a Daily Telegraph article by Robert Jenrick and Jacob Rees-Mogg, with historian of the Conservative Party Alistair Cooke, Baron Lexden describing Isham as an "amiable Northamptonshire squire [who] served his county contentedly on the backbenches for 35 years. He could not have risen higher".

== Notes ==
- "ISHAM, Sir Edmund, 6th Bt. (1690-1772), of Lamport Hall, Northants". History of Parliament Online.

Parliament of Great Britain
Preceded by Sir Justinian Isham; Thomas Cartwright	Member of Parliament for Northamptonshire; 1737–1772; With: Thomas Cartwright 1737–1748; Valentine Knightley 1748–1754; William Cartwright 1754–1768; Sir William Dolben 1768–1772	Succeeded by Lucy Knightley; Sir William Dolben
Baronetage of England
Preceded by Justinian Isham	Baronet (of Lamport); 1737–1772	Succeeded by Justinian Isham
