= Euseby Isham =

English academic administrator

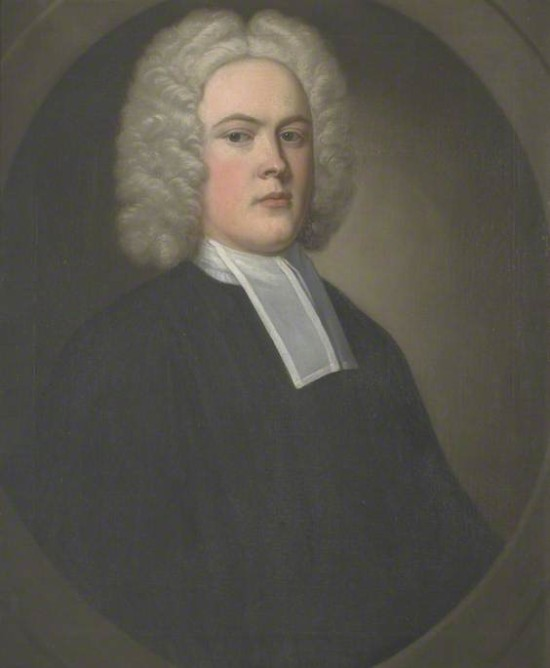
Reverend Euseby Isham Vice-Chancellor, Oxford University

Rev. Euseby Isham, D.D. (6 November 1697 – 17 June 1755) was an English academic administrator at the University of Oxford.

Isham was born probably at Lamport Hall in Northamptonshire, to Sir Justinian Isham, 4th Baronet (1658-1730), of Lamport, and his wife Elizabeth Turnor (1666-1713). His father and two older brothers were successively the 4th, 5th and 6th baronets. He matriculated at Balliol College, Oxford in 1716, earning a Bachelor of Arts there in 1718, going on in 1721 to receive a Master of Arts and in 1733 a Doctor of Divinity at Lincoln College, Oxford. Upon entering holy orders while at Oxford, he became Rector in 1729 of Lamport, and was elected in 1731 Rector (head) of Lincoln College, a post he held until 1755. He also served concurrently from 1744 until 1747 as vice-chancellor of Oxford University. He died in Northamptonshire and is buried there in the Lamport parish church.

Isham was married on 1 May 1739 at Brockhall, Northamptonshire to Elizabeth Panting (1717-1808), who was the daughter of Matthew Panting, the Master of Pembroke College, Oxford. They had four children, including Sir Justinian Isham IV (1740-1818), who became the 7th Baronet of Lamport, and Edmund Isham (1747-1817), who became Warden of All Souls College, Oxford. A painting of Rev. Euseby Isham by an unknown artist hangs at Lamport Hall.

== See also ==
- Edmund Isham (1744?–1817), Warden of All Souls College, Oxford

== Notes ==
Academic offices
| Preceded by John Morley | Rector of Lincoln College, Oxford; 1731–1755 | Succeeded by Richard Hutchins |
| Preceded by Walter Hodges | Vice-Chancellor of Oxford University; 1744–1747 | Succeeded by John Purnell |
