= Thomas Edwards (poet) =

16th-century English poet

Thomas Edwards (fl. 1587–1595) was an English poet who published two Ovidian epic poems Cephalus and Procris and Narcissus. Beyond his name, nothing is known with certainty of Edwards. He has been provisionally identified with a Shropshire law student of that name who transferred from Furnival's Inn to Lincoln's Inn in June 1587, where he shared a room with a known friend of John Donne. Edwards may have contributed the Latin verse to Adriaan van Roomen's Parvum theatrum urbium, published in 1595.

== Cephalus and Procris and Narcissus ==
Edwards's two known poems concern characters who all feature in Ovid's poem Metamorphoses. Cephalus and Procris are a romantic couple. Narcissus famously fell in love with his own reflection.

Edwards's poems were published as a single volume in 1595; Cephalus and Procris is in couplet form, Narcissus using a seven-line stanza. In the former, Edwards appears to be imitating Marlowe and in the latter Shakespeare.

The author concluded each work with a long postscript. In Narcissus this includes, using aliases, references to other poets including Amintas (Thomas Watson), Collyn (Edmund Spenser), Leander (Christopher Marlowe), Rosamond (Samuel Daniel) and Adon (Shakespeare). A mysterious poet "in purple robes" praised at the end of the list has not been convincingly identified.

=== Reception ===
The book was not well received. Contemporaries such as William Covell and Thomas Nashe derided it. Covell listed it among the "smaller lights" of modern poetry. Nashe attacked it in his pamphlet Have with You to Saffron-Walden. No copies of the book were known until a portion of a copy was found in the Lamport Library of Sir Charles Isham, 10th Baronet in 1867. A complete copy was subsequently discovered at the Cathedral Library at Peterborough. It was republished by the Roxburghe Club in 1882. Before this the poem was only known by its title and the references to it by Nashe and others. Nashe appears to say that it was by written by Anthony Chute. It was thus attributed to Chute until the actual book with its author's name on the title page was located.

Various authors starting with Thomas Warton have suggested that Shakespeare satirised Cephalus and Procris in the Pyramus and Thisbe episode in A Midsummer Night's Dream, supposedly written by an incompetent poet, Peter Quince.

Pyramus: Not Shafalus to Procrus was so true.
Thisbe: As Shafalus to Procrus, I to you.

(Midsummer Night's Dream, Act v. 1)

However, this view has been generally discounted since the poem was located, as it bears no resemblance to the verses attributed to Peter Quince.
