= Joseph Wasse =

Joseph Wasse (1672–1738) was an English cleric and classical scholar.

== Life ==
He was born in Yorkshire, and entered Queens' College, Cambridge as a sizar in 1691. He became bible clerk in 1694, scholar in 1695, was B.A. in 1694, fellow and M.A. in 1698, B.D. in 1707.

In 1711 Wasse was presented to the rectory of Aynhoe, Northamptonshire, by Thomas Cartwright, with whom he was on close terms. He passed most of his time in his library at Aynhoe, and, according to William Whiston, Richard Bentley thought him the second scholar in England.

== Death and legacy ==
Wasse died unmarried on 19 November 1738. Part of his library was acquired by his successor at Aynhoe, Dr. Francis Yarborough, later principal of Brasenose College, Oxford (1745–1770). The books, with manuscript notes by Wasse, were given by Yarborough's heirs to the college. Wasse's copy of Thucydides, with many notes, went to the Bodleian Library.

== Works ==
Wasse assisted Ludolph Kuster in his edition of the Suda (1705), and in 1710 published a critical edition of Sallust, based on an examination of nearly 80 manuscripts. The edition of Thucydides by Karl Andreas Duker and Wasse was published in 1731 at Amsterdam, and was reprinted at Glasgow in 1759 with the Latin version by Robert and Andrew Foulis.

In Samuel Jebb's Bibliotheca Literaria Wasse wrote extensively; the William Bowyer felt that the length of Wasse's articles was detrimental. He contributed scientific articles to the Philosophical Transactions. One topic he investigated was the production of lightning bolts with gunpowder; he had attended experimental philosophy lectures by Roger Cotes and William Whiston at Cambridge.

Wasse became a proselyte to Samuel Clarke's Arian opinions, and in 1719 published Reformed Devotions, dedicated to Cartwright and his wife.

== Notes ==
Attribution

This article incorporates text from a publication now in the public domain: Lee, Sidney, ed. (1899). "Wasse, Joseph". Dictionary of National Biography. Vol. 59. London: Smith, Elder & Co.
