= Elizabeth Isham =

English intellectual, herbalist and diarist

Elizabeth Isham (1609–1654) was an English intellectual, herbalist, and diarist. She is best known today for her two autobiographical diaries, which are among the earliest known examples of autobiography written by an Englishwoman. Although a wealthy woman, Anne Cotterill has said that for Isham her "mind was more to her than wealth".

== Early life and family ==
Elizabeth Isham, the eldest of three children, was born in 1609 at Lamport Hall in Northamptonshire, England. John Isham, her great-grandfather, was a small mercer and merchant-adventurer who later became a wealthy woolens merchant and master warden of the Company of Mercers. He purchased Lamport Hall in 1560 from Sir William Cecil, 1st Baron Burghley, and it became the family estate.

Elizabeth's father, Sir John Isham (1582–1651), was made the first baronet of Lamport by Charles I in 1627, when she was eighteen. Her mother was Judith Lewyn Isham (d. 1625), daughter of William Lewin, who was an educated Anglican judge of the Prerogative Court of Canterbury and a master in chancery. Elizabeth's sister (also called Judith) was born a year after Elizabeth. Her royalist brother Justinian (1610-1675), the second baronet of Lamport, left for Oxford during the English Civil War, leaving Elizabeth to care for her father and four nieces, and to manage the estate. The estate was later sequestered by Parliament.

Judith, Elizabeth's mother, had a close relationship with each of her children, and played a significant role in Elizabeth's religious upbringing. At the age of eight or nine, Elizabeth learned the verses of the 'Psalm Book' by memorisation. Judith also gave both Elizabeth and Judith a prayer book to pray with two or three times a day. Elizabeth grew up to become an extremely pious young woman with a strong sense of her religious duties and calling.

As a young woman, Isham had to decide whether to obey her father's wishes to marry and raise a family, or to remain single in order to devote her life to God. She determined not to marry, and her father ultimately supported her in this decision.

== Personal life and death ==
Isham spent most of her life at her family estate of Lamport Hall in Northamptonshire, but she did on occasion visit relatives in London. The capital city provided greater opportunities for a young woman to find a suitable marriage partner, so when aged eighteen Isham was sent by her father to stay there with her uncle, James Pagitt.

Isham found both city life and suitors not to her liking. She found it difficult to choose between devoting herself to marriage and motherhood, or to God. She decided that she could not engage in both to their fullest potential, so chose to pursue the religious life. Isham's choice to reject marriage resulted from both the hardships faced from her failed relationships and difficult decisions made of her devotion to God. She would have had all the benefits of marriage, of becoming a widow, and becoming a mother and heir to the estates if she had married her father's choice of suitors. However, none of that mattered to her. This freedom during the 17th century for women was rare and eventually opened doors to a whole new light that being single was not strict grounds for rejection in society. Isham was able to find and follow her vocational calling.

Another reason for staying single may have been that Isham enjoyed solitude and privacy to pray and to spiritually connect with God, given that "she often preferred to be alone, busying herself with work". Although she never had children, Isham helped her brother to raise his four young daughters after his wife, Jane, died soon after giving birth to a son. Isham took on the role of a surrogate mother for the girls. In fact, she dedicated her most treasured work, the "Booke of Remembrance" to them for their religious education. Isham died in 1654 at the age of 45, three years after her father's death.

== Herbalism ==
Women often practised as herbalists in the midst of their household/domestic tasks. On the one hand women had a lot of practical medical knowledge but on the other hand they were not seen as respected members of the medical hierarchy. The one exception to this might be elite women who were respected for their skills.

Isham's primary motivation and interest in medicine, and specifically herbalism, peaked through the history of illnesses of many of her close family members: her paternal grandmother (d.1621) died due to a terminal illness; her mother (d.1625) died from chronic poor health and possible pneumonia; her sister (d.1636), who was both ill as well as experiencing several broken bones; and her sister-in-law Jane (d. 1639) died after giving birth to her fifth child. Isham's mother died at the age of 34 when she was 16 years old. Isham's decision to pursue herbal knowledge started in her mid-twenties. Physicians often visited the Isham household due to illnesses in the family. Isham grew to distrust the methods and diagnoses of these physicians, and their invasive surgeries which often led to death. Hence, Isham turned to herbal remedies and studied them as an alternative means of healthcare. By consulting a skilled herbalist called Mr Naper, commonly called "Sandy," she began to use cordials and herbal remedies known as "physicks". The cordials aided the recovery of her mother Judith, and reportedly helped her to live another year. This was the advent of Isham thinking there were non-invasive alternatives to help cure people of illnesses.

Another driving force behind Isham's interest in herbals and medicine was that her great-grandmother and aunt had notable skills in medicine. Isham's great-grandmother was a skilled surgeon, and her aunt was a strong motivator to drive her to pursue herbal knowledge through borrowed books. Isham had a great interest in gardening, and from there she sought to learn more about herbals through gardening books. It was uncommon for women during this era to attend schools, but elite women did have an opportunity to learn Latin with tutors at home. However, Isham went on to pursue learning more about herbals rather than Latin. She also attempted to learn French to acclimate with the women of the London society, but never completed her lessons. Isham's familial inheritance of females who already had medical knowledge, gave her the "authoritative background" necessary to pursue her interest in herbalism.

Herbalism might have also been a part of Isham's religious life as another part of her "religious calling/duty" to help others. Isham interpreted that "surrounding all is Christ’s example providing 'the way.'" She found a voice through God that this was her calling in life. There has also been "evidence that Isham was taking medical notes well into the 1640s, particularly from a translation of Giovanni da Vigo, the surgeon…" Isham also noted what was incorporated in her mother's cordials as well as in food such as meat, and they included: rosemary, sage, marjoram, betony, and sassafras. She wrote many of these notes through her practice and observations rather than from her memory. Isham found her own voice as an individual by her choice to practise herbalism, which was of far greater importance to her rather than learning Latin.

== Diarist and "My Booke of Rememberance" ==
Isham began to write at the early age of seven or eight, and continued to write extensively throughout her lifetime. During her early years of writing, she had a natural inclination to write and to copy texts and use the vocabulary she learned in her own works. Cotterill mentions that from an early age, Isham "constantly read, copied down, studied, memorized, and repeated prayers, psalms, chapters of the Bible, excerpts from collections of biblical 'places,' literary texts, and sermons". She resorted to writing as an outlet from her depression due to the deaths of her mother and sister and debates with her father over her marriage. Writing was a means of comfort to Isham and "she turned to writing as a way of using God's word when she felt herself in danger of rejecting it".

Around 1638–1639 when Isham was 30, she composed her first extensive work called My Booke of Rememberance, where she recorded her thoughts, beliefs, explanations for her decisions, her struggles, and the freedom of her single life. She specifically talked about her struggles in dealing with the loss of her mother and sister who were close to her, the unsuccessful relationship between her and her father's recommended suitor, and her quest for a single life. She wrote this was her moment at "the pitts brinke of despair" since she wrote this during her most troubled times.

== Personal hobbies and interests ==
Isham also had interests and hobbies such as gardening, needlework, painting, and reading, in particular religious literature. Her interests in needlework and gardening also provide the "occupational backdrop" that would be helpful for her in practicing herbalism. Through her enjoyment from gardening, she found there were links to gardening and her study of plants and medicine. She discovered that some plants, in particular herbs, could potentially be used for medicinal purposes. Isham found hobbies, especially needlework to be a "kind of preventative cure" for depression. Isham took herbalism seriously as her career while needlework was her outlet for relaxation and a "kind of calming medicine". She was a very intellectual and knowledgeable woman in many areas, not limited her knowledge to religion. Julie Eckerle mentions that Isham was strikingly independent in all matters, from poetry, ballads, and herbals to playing cards and reading romances. Isham was an extraordinary woman of her time not just being a single Christian woman, but an intellectual Christian single woman.

== List of works ==
Isham's first diary (1608-1654) is held at the Northamptonshire Record Office (IL 3365). The first diary includes the period from her childhood until she reaches forty years of age.

The second diary called The Booke of Rememberance records her life story including her courtship, her inner thoughts about choosing between a married life versus singlehood, and the medical hardships faced within her family. This diary was completed when she was thirty years old. This second diary has come to public attention recently and is housed at Princeton University Library, Robert H. Taylor Collection (RTC 01 no.62).
