= Thomas Cartwright (politician) =

English landowner and Tory politician

Member of Parliament for Northamptonshire
- In office 1695–1698
- In office 1701–1748

Personal details
- Born: 1671
- Died: 10 March 1748 (aged 76–77)
- Party: Tory
- Occupation: Landowner, Politician

Thomas Cartwright (1671–1748), of Aynho Park, Northamptonshire was an English landowner and Tory politician, who sat in the English and British House of Commons between 1695 and 1748. As the longest serving Member he eventually became Father of the House.

== Early life ==
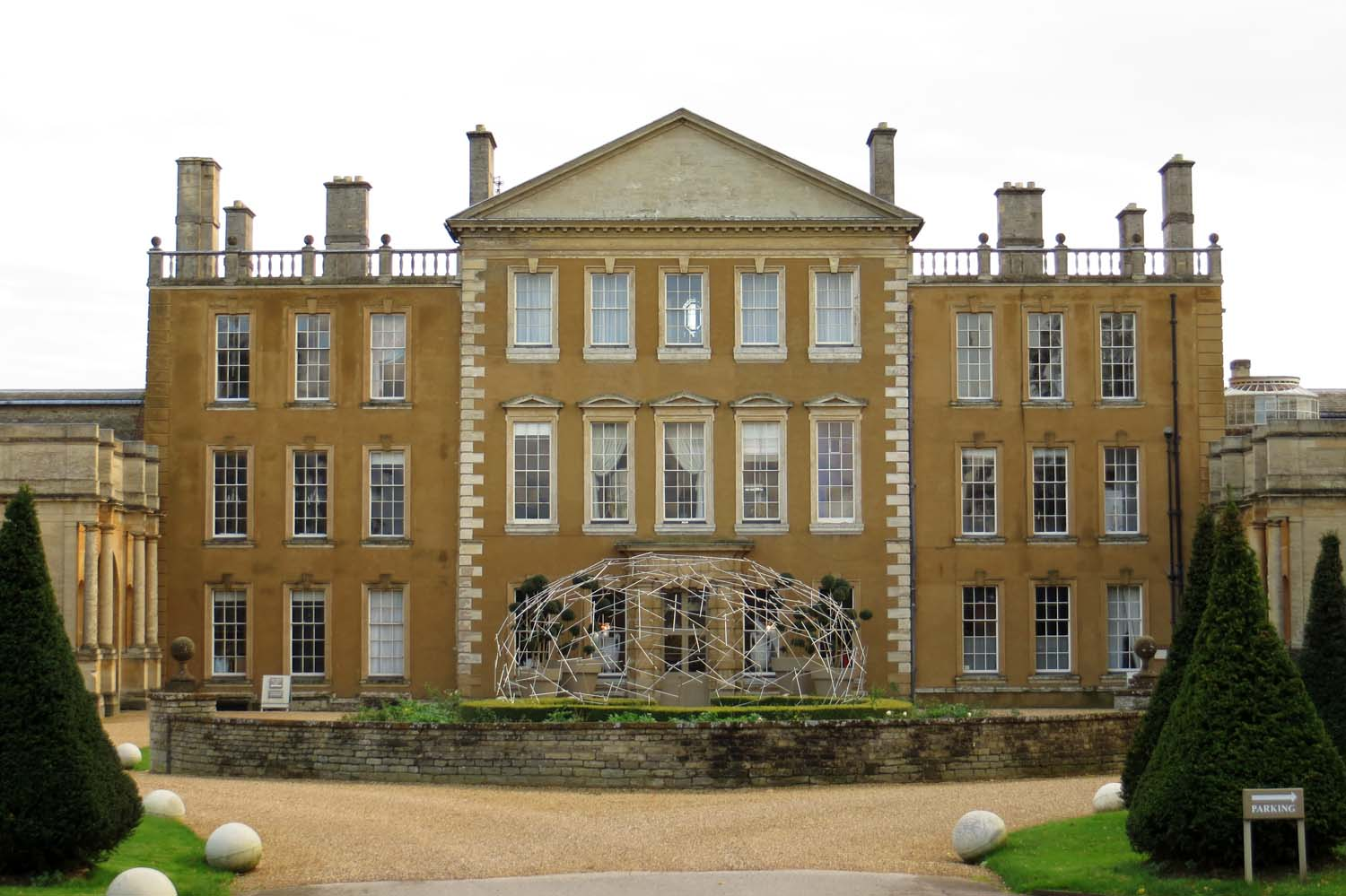
Aynhoe Park House

Cartwright was the only surviving son of William Cartwright, of Aynho in Northamptonshire and Bloxham in Oxfordshire, and his wife Ursula Fairfax, daughter of Ferdinando Fairfax, 2nd Lord Fairfax of Cameron. In 1676, he succeeded both his father and grandfather. He was admitted to St Catharine's College, Cambridge in 1687 where Samuel Bradford was his tutor.

== Career ==
Cartwright served as High Sheriff of Northamptonshire in 1693. He was returned as Member of Parliament for Northamptonshire in an expensive contest at the 1695 English general election. Lord Charles Spencer was a Whig candidate, but fortunately his father Robert Spencer, 2nd Earl of Sunderland baulked at the required expenditure. Cartwright was then defeated at the 1698 English general election. He served as High Sheriff of Oxfordshire in 1699. He did not stand at the first general election of 1701 but in the second general election of 1701 he was returned after accepting a pact with Sir Justinian Isham, 4th Baronet that he had previously declined. He voted on 26 February 1702 for the resolution to vindicate the Commons’ proceedings in the impeaching the King's ministers. He was returned again at the 1702 English general election but was absent from the House for some time because he had sprained his foot badly in a hunting accident. He was absent at the division on the Tack and was subsequently listed as a sneaker. At the 1705 English general election he was returned in a contest again with Isham. He voted against the Court candidate for Speaker. He was returned unopposed at the 1708 British general election but was not an active Member. He voted against the impeachment of Dr Sacheverell in 1710. He was returned unopposed again at the 1710 British general election and was listed as one of the ‘worthy patriots’ who approved the exposure of the previous ministry's mismanagements, and as a ‘Tory patriot’ who voted for peace in 1711 . He also became a member of the October Club.

In the period 1707 to 1711, Cartwright had Aynhoe Park remodelled. The work is attributed to Thomas Archer, on grounds of style. In 1711 the scholar Joseph Wasse came to be rector of Aynho, on the death of Matthew Hutton; in a letter to Jean Le Clerc he praised the library of Cartwright's wife Armine . Cartwright went frequently to Bath where he was in the company of leading Tory families - the Harleys, the Foleys and the Winningtons.

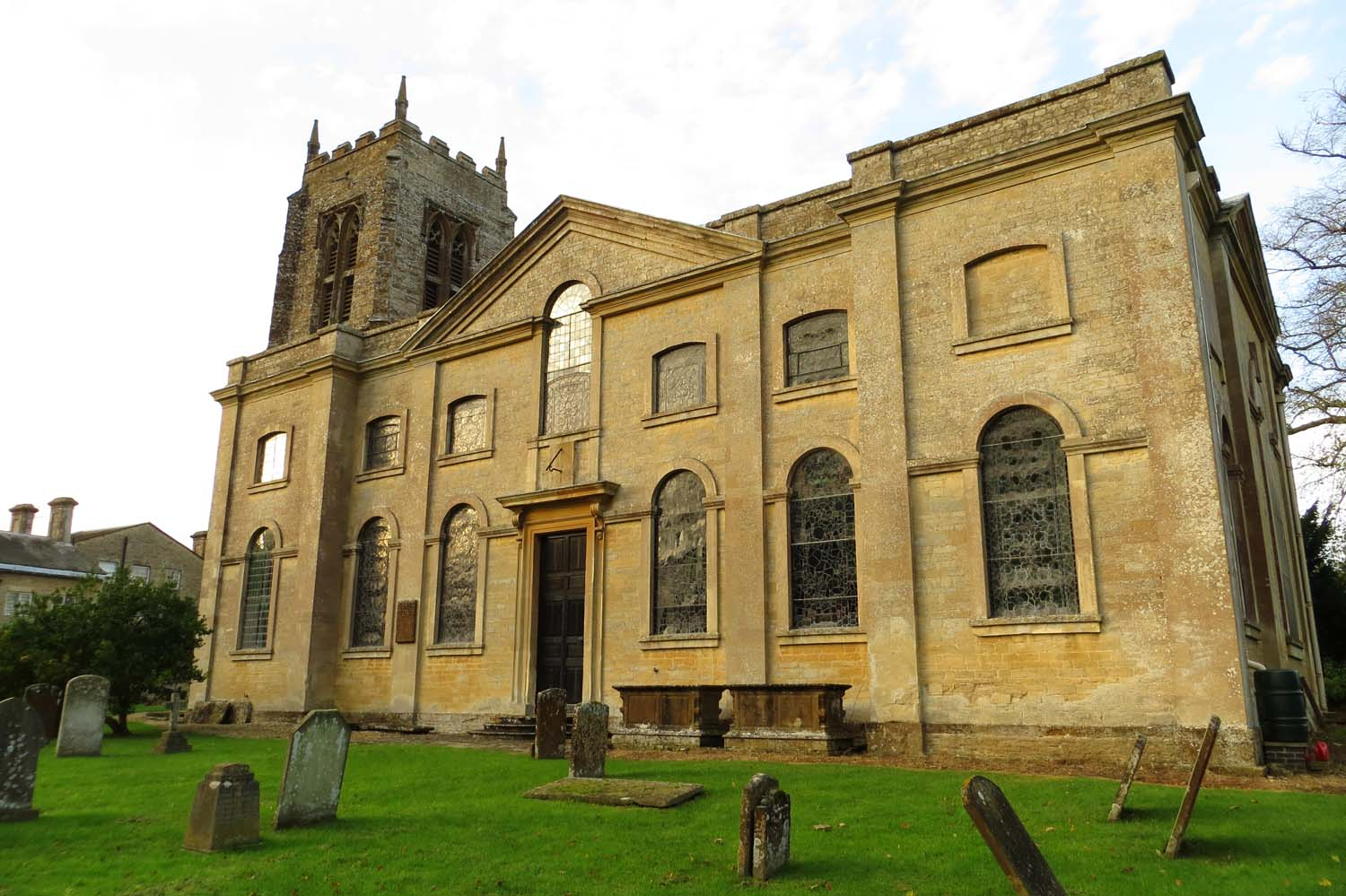
St Michael's Church in Aynho, rebuilt from 1723 for Thomas Cartwright

Cartwright was returned again for Northamptonshire at the 1713 British general election. He was classed as a Tory who sometimes voted with the Whigs. In 1714 his main parliamentary action was supervising the passage of a bill on the navigation of the Nene. He was returned again at the 1715 British general election and from then on voted consistently against the Administration. In 1716, he was elected a Fellow of the Royal Society . He was returned again as MP for Northamptonshire at the 1722 British general election. From 1723 to 1725 he commissioned Edward Wing to rebuild the parish church at Aynho, apart from the tower and was also a donor to the Fenny Stratford church, as commemorated on its ceiling. He was returned again for Northamptonshire at the general elections of 1727, 1734 and 1741.

Cartwright died on 10 March 1748, aged 77, and was buried at Aynho.

== Family ==
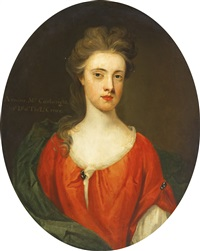
Armine Crew, studio of Godfrey Kneller

Cartwright in 1699 married Armine Crew, daughter of Thomas Crew, 2nd Baron Crew. They had two sons and three daughters. William Cartwright (died 1768) the Northamptionshire MP was their elder son. William Ralph Cartwright was a great-grandson. Cartwright's sister Rhoda married Lord Henry Cavendish.

== Notes ==
Parliament of England
Preceded by Sir St Andrew St John, Bt; John Parkhurst	Member of Parliament for Northamptonshire; 1695–1698; With: Sir St Andrew St John, Bt	Succeeded by Sir Justinian Isham, Bt; John Parkhurst
Preceded by Sir Justinian Isham, Bt; John Parkhurst	Member of Parliament for Northamptonshire; 1701–1707; With: Sir Justinian Isham, Bt	Succeeded by Parliament of Great Britain
Parliament of Great Britain
Preceded by Parliament of England	Member of Parliament for Northamptonshire; 1707–1748; With: Sir Justinian Isham, Bt 1707–1730; Sir Justinian Isham, Bt 1730–1737; Sir Edmund Isham, Bt 1737–1748	Succeeded by Sir Edmund Isham, Bt; Valentine Knightley
Preceded by Edward Ashe	Father of the House; 1747-1748	Succeeded by Richard Shuttleworth
