= Anthony Chute =

English poet and pamphleteer

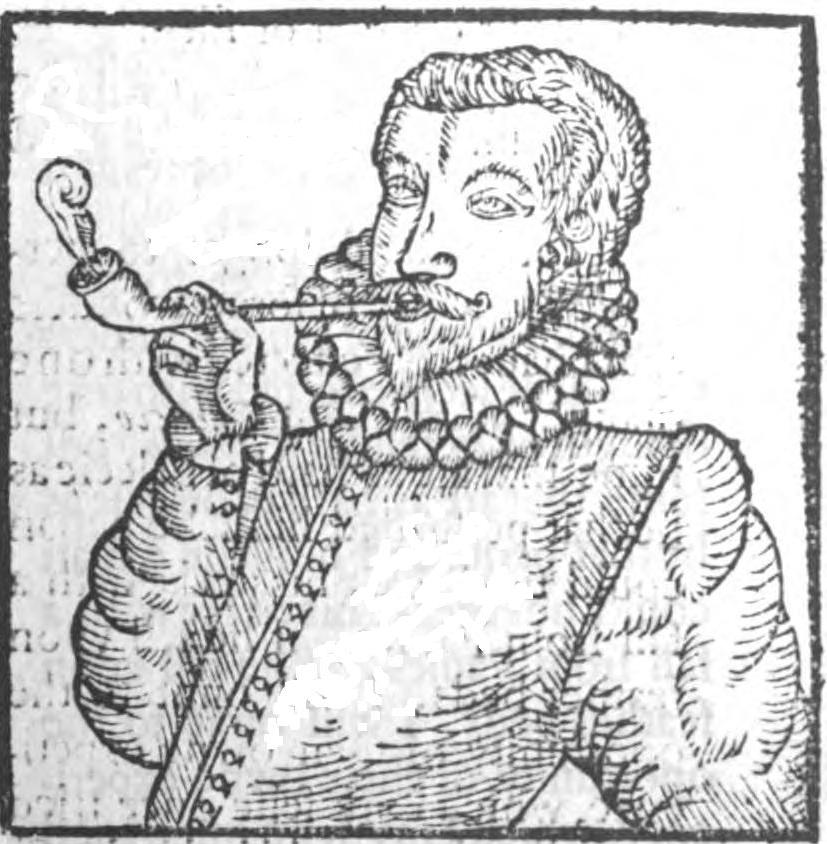
The first known image of a man smoking a pipe, from Chute's Tabaco (1595).

Anthony Chute (fl. 1590s – 1595) was an English poet and pamphleteer. Very little is known about him.

== Life ==
Chute appears to have been a protégé of Gabriel Harvey. Harvey refers to him in his work Pierces Supererogation, saying that Chute was an orator and a herald. He also states that Chute had participated in Francis Drake's 1589 English Armada expedition to Portugal.

In 1593, Chute published Beauty Dishonoured, written under the title of Shore's wife, a narrative poem supposed to be the lament of Jane Shore, whose ghost tells her life story and makes moral reflections. In a dedication he called the poem, "the first invention of my beginning muse" implying that it was his earliest work.

Chute supported Harvey in his literary war against Thomas Nashe. Pierces Supererogation contains two poems by Chute and letters in which he praises Harvey and lambasts Nashe. Shortly afterwards, Chute wrote to Lord Burghley, applying for the position of pursuivant of arms, describing himself as a "poor gentleman and a scholar".

In 1595, Chute published Tabaco, the first English discussion of the tobacco plant. The pamphlet lauds the many "health giving" properties of the tobacco leaf, explaining how the application of the leaf to the skin can cure illnesses and that smoking it relieves chest conditions. In the preface to the work the publisher writes that Chute died before the work was made public.

Chute is ridiculed in Thomas Nashe's pamphlet Have with You to Saffron-Walden (1596), in which Nashe states that Chute's poetry is so bad it would never have even been published if he had not been Harvey's yes-man. He also says that Chute died of dropsy "with taking too much of drink".

For a long time, Thomas Edwards' poem Cephalus and Procris was attributed to Chute because of a remark about it in Have with You to Saffron-Walden.
