= John Isham =

John Isham may refer to:

- Sir John Isham (1582–1651), High Sheriff of Northamptonshire
- John Isham (composer) (1680–1726), English composer and organist
- John Isham Farmstead, on the National Register of Historic Places listings in Lucas County, Ohio
- John William Isham (1866–?), American vaudeville impresario
