= Zacheus Isham =

Anglican clergyman and religious author (1651–1705)

Zacheus Isham (1651–1705) was a Church of England clergyman and religious author.

Zacheus (Zacchaeus) Isham was the son of Thomas Isham, Rector of Barby, Northamptonshire (d. 1676) and his wife Mary Isham (d. 1694). He was also the grandson of another Zacheus Isham, who was the first cousin once removed of Sir John Isham, Bt.

He matriculated in 1666 from Christ Church, Oxford, eventually earning his B.A. (1671), M.A. (1674), B.D. (1682), and D.D. (1689) degrees there. After completing his third degree in 1671, he served for a while as tutor to his cousin Sir Thomas Isham, Bt., accompanying Sir Thomas to Italy and elsewhere, where they collected many art works that are on display today at Lamport Hall in Northamptonshire.

Upon returning from the continent, Rev. Isham became an interlocutor in 1679 at the Oxford divinity school, and was the speaker in 1683 of an oration honoring Sir Thomas Bodley. He was subsequently appointed about 1685 as chaplain to Henry Compton, the bishop of London, became a prebendary (canon) in 1685–6 at St. Paul's Cathedral, and was installed in 1691 as a canon at Canterbury Cathedral. He became the successor in 1694 of his father-in-law Thomas Pittis as Rector of St. Botolph's, Bishopsgate in London, and represented the clergy of the diocese of London at the convocation of 1696. His last appointment was in 1701 as Rector of Solihull, Warwickshire, where he died on 5 July 1705, and was buried in the Solihull Church, where there is a monument to him on the chancel floor.

Rev. Isham was married to Elizabeth Pittis, the daughter of Rev. Thomas Pittis, D.D., chaplain to King Charles II. They had four sons and four daughters, the second of whom, Mary (d 1750), married Arthur Brooke, the grandfather of Sir Richard de Capell Brooke, Bt.

He published the following works.

- Several sermons, including one on the death of Dr. John Scott (1694), which is incorporated in Wilford's Memorials.
- The Catechism of the Church, with Proofs from the New Testament, 1695, 8vo.
- Philosophy containing the Book of Job, Proverbs, and Wisdom, with explanatory notes, 1706, 8vo.
- There is also a short piece of his among the Rawlinson Manuscript in the Bodleian Library entitled The Catechism of the Church, with Proofs from the New Testament, and some additional questions and answers, 1694.
- An attestation by Isham and others is prefixed to George Keith's Fourth Narrative ... detecting the Quakers' Gross Errors in Quotations ..., 1706, 4to.
