= Sir Justinian Isham, 4th Baronet =

English landowner and Tory politician

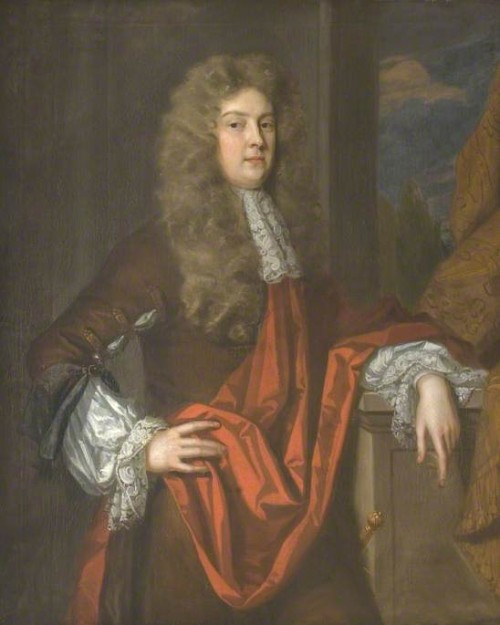
Sir Justinian Isham II by Godfrey Kneller

Sir Justinian Isham, 4th Baronet (11 August 1658 – 13 May 1730) was an English landowner and Tory politician, who sat in the House of Commons almost continuously from 1685 until his death in 1730. He was the longest serving member, later termed Father of the House, from 1729 to 1730.

== Early life ==
Justinian Isham II was born on 11 August 1658 to Sir Justinian Isham, 2nd Baronet of Lamport, and his wife Vere Leigh, the daughter of Thomas Leigh, 1st Baron Leigh of Stoneleigh, Warwickshire. He matriculated at Christ Church, Oxford in 1674, but did not take a degree. and was admitted at Lincoln's Inn in 1677. He succeeded unexpectedly to the baronetcy of Lamport and Lamport Hall, Northamptonshire on 26 July 1681 with the sudden death of his brother Sir Thomas Isham from smallpox. He married, on 16 July 1683, in Stoke Rochford, Lincolnshire, Elizabeth Turnor (1666-1713), the only daughter of Sir Edmund Turnor (1619-1707) of Stoke Rochford Hall in Kent, and his wife Margaret Harrison (1623-1679), the daughter of Sir John Harrison (1589-1669).

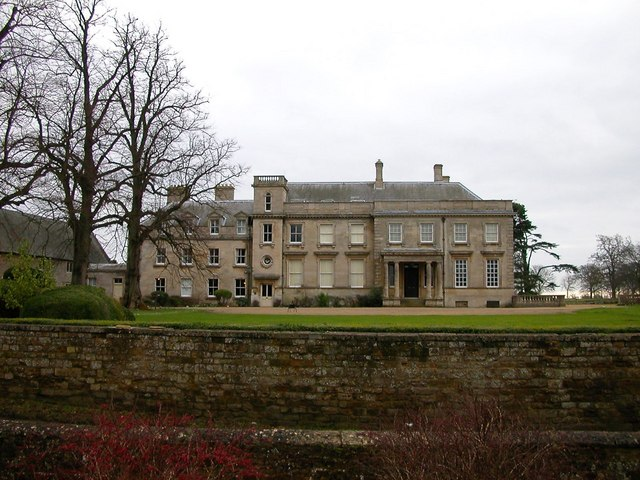
Lamport Hall, Northamptonshire

== Career ==
Isham was returned as Member of Parliament for Northampton at the 1685 English general election. He was returned again at the 1689 English general election, but was defeated at the 1690 English general election. He was returned unopposed, through an electoral pact, for Northampton at a by-election on 9 March 1694 and was returned again at the 1695 English general election. He was ready to stand again for the borough at the 1698 English general election, but with four days notice, he was called upon by the local gentry to stand for Northamptonshire. Although not prepared to put himself out because of the short notice, he was returned in a contest as MP for Northamptonshire. He was classed as Country Party but was frequently absent from Parliament, probably for domestic reasons. He was returned again at the first general election of 1701, and was blacklisted for opposing the preparations for war. He was returned again at the second general election of 1701 and in 1702 supported the motion vindicating the Commons’ late proceedings in impeaching the Whig ministers. He topped the poll at the 1702 English general election. He did not vote for the Tack on 28 November 1704 and was identified as a 'sneaker'. At the 1705 English general election he was returned in another contest for Northamptonshire at the top of the poll, despite a lackluster campaign. He voted against the Court candidate for the Speaker and in support of his cousin, William Bromley on 25 September 1705. At the 1708 British general election he was returned unopposed as Tory MP for Northamptonshire. Domesticity and ill-health led to absence from Parliament, but he was able to vote against the impeachment of Dr Sacheverell in 1710. He was returned unopposed again at the 1710 British general election and was listed in April 1711 as a ‘Tory patriot’ who voted for the peace, and as a ‘worthy patriot’ who helped expose the mismanagements of the previous administration. He also appears to have played a part in organizing the October Club. By 1713 he was suffering from gout but his wife was seriously ill, and died in August 1713. Isham was returned unopposed for Northamptonshire again, but after the shattering blow to his domestic contentment, was in severe depression for a year. He finally returned to public life in August 1714.

Isham was returned again for Northamptonshire at the 1715 British general election and from then on voted consistently with the opposition. He was returned again at the 1722 British general election and at the 1727 British general election.

== Death and legacy ==
Isham died on 13 May 1730 at 72 years of age and was buried at Lamport next to his wife who had predeceased him by several years. They had several children, ten of whom survived, including the three sons listed below.

- Sir Justinian Isham (1687-1737), who succeed his father as the 5th Baronet of Lamport
- Sir Edmund Isham (1690-1772), who became the 6th Baronet of Lamport upon the death of his brother
- Euseby Isham (1697-1755), who became the Vice-Chancellor of Oxford University.

There is a painting of Ishamattributed to Michael Dahl that hangs at Lamport Hall, together with another by Godfrey Kneller.

== Notes ==
Parliament of England
Preceded by William Langham; The Hon. Ralph Montagu	Member of Parliament for Northampton; 1685–1690; With: Richard Rainsford 1685–1689; William Langham 1689–1690	Succeeded by William Langham; Sir Thomas Samwell, Bt
Preceded by William Langham; Sir Thomas Samwell, Bt	Member of Parliament for Northampton; 1694–1698; With: William Langham 1694–1695; Christopher Montagu 1695–1698	Succeeded by Christopher Montagu; William Thursby
Preceded by Sir St Andrew St John, Bt; Thomas Cartwright	Member of Parliament for Northamptonshire; 1698–1707; With: John Parkhurst 1698–1701; Thomas Cartwright 1701–1707	Succeeded by Parliament of Great Britain
Parliament of Great Britain
Preceded by Parliament of England	Member of Parliament for Northamptonshire; 1707–1730; With: Thomas Cartwright	Succeeded by Sir Justinian Isham, Bt; Thomas Cartwright
Preceded by Lord William Powlett	Father of the House; 1729–1730	Succeeded by Sir Charles Turner, 1st Baronet, of Warham
Baronetage of England
Preceded by Thomas Isham	Baronet (of Lamport); 1681–1730	Succeeded by Justinian Isham
