= Hanging Houghton =

Village in Northamptonshire, England

Coordinates: 52.3565°N 0.8957°W

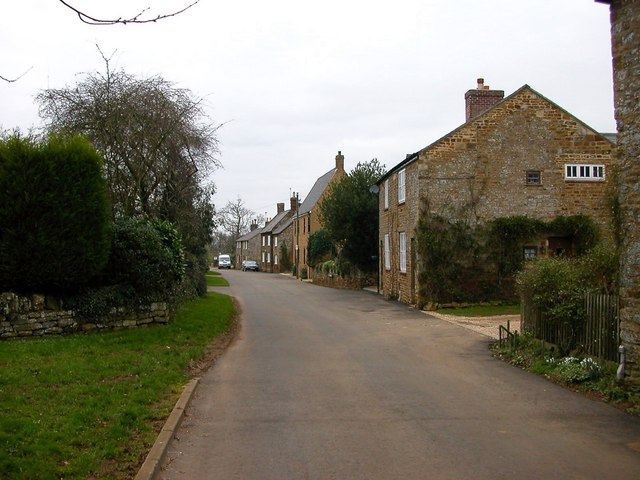

- Location within Northamptonshire
- OS grid reference: SP7573
- Civil parish: Lamport
- Unitary authority: West Northamptonshire
- Ceremonial county: Northamptonshire
- Region: East Midlands
- Country: England
- Sovereign state: United Kingdom
- Post town: Northampton
- Postcode district: NN6
- Dialling code: 01604
- Police: Northamptonshire
- Fire: Northamptonshire
- Ambulance: East Midlands
- UK Parliament: Kettering

Hanging Houghton is a small village and former civil parish, now in the parish of Lamport, in the West Northamptonshire district, in the ceremonial county of Northamptonshire, England. It is on the A508 road between Brixworth and Lamport. In 1931 the parish had a population of 84.

== History ==
The villages name means 'Houghton (= hill-spur farm/settlement) on a steep slope'.

In 1866 Hanging Houghton became a civil parish; on 1 April 1935 the parish was abolished and merged with that of Lamport.

== Great house and gardens ==
Hanging Houghton was the location of a great house and gardens, which although no longer present is listed as a scheduled monument as part of the Ancient Monuments and Archaeological Areas Act 1979. This monument encompasses the now buried and the earthwork remains of the house and gardens, and is in the south-west part of the village.

From 1471 until it was abandoned in 1665, the house was owned by the Montague family. It is shown on a map in 1655 as having highly elaborate formal gardens including a knot garden and several terraced walks. The ruins of the house survived into the late 18th century, but all that now remains is a rectangular building platform measuring 40 metres by 30 metres in the north-east corner of the land. Contemporary illustrations suggest the house was of typical late-16th-century design with three bays and a symmetrical south elevation with central porch. Nothing of the gardens remains other than a series of rectangular areas noticeable by shallow banks and earthworks measuring less than 1 metre in height.

== Listed buildings ==
The village is home to five Grade II–listed buildings:

- A K6 telephone box on Manor Road
- The Hanging Houghton School House
- Clint Hill Farmhouse
- Manor Farmhouse
- Numbers 18, 19 and 20 Manor Road

== The Domesday Book ==
Hanging Houghton was referenced as a settlement in the Domesday Book of 1086. It was recorded as having a population of 30 households. The book recorded the households, owners, resources and land value as follows:

| Owner | Number of Households | Land & Resources | Land Value in 1086 |
|---|---|---|---|
| The Abbey of Bury St. Edmunds | 3 freemen, 12 smallholders | 2 ploughlands. 2 men's plough teams | 12 shillings |
| Count Robert of Morton | 3 villagers, 2 smallholders | 4 ploughlands. 1.5 lord's plough teams. 1.5 men's plough teams | 1 pound |
| Walter of Flanders | - | - | 4 shillings |
| Countess Judith | 6 freeman, 4 smallholders | 2 ploughlands. 2 men's plough teams. | 13 shillings and 2 pence |
