= Isham (given name) =

Isham is a masculine given name which may refer to:

- Isham Hardy (1899–1983), American football player
- Isham G. Harris (1818–1897), American politician, governor of Tennessee and senator
- Isham Jones (1894–1956), American bandleader, saxophonist, bassist and songwriter
- Isham F. Norris (1851–1928), African-American businessman and politician
- Isham Randolph (1684–1742), American planter, merchant, public official and shipmaster, maternal grandfather of Thomas Jefferson
- Isham Reavis (1836–1914), American jurist, associate justice of the Supreme Court of Arizona Territory
- Isham Shahruddin (born 1966), Malaysian former footballer
- Isham Singh, Indian politician
