= Richard Hutchins =

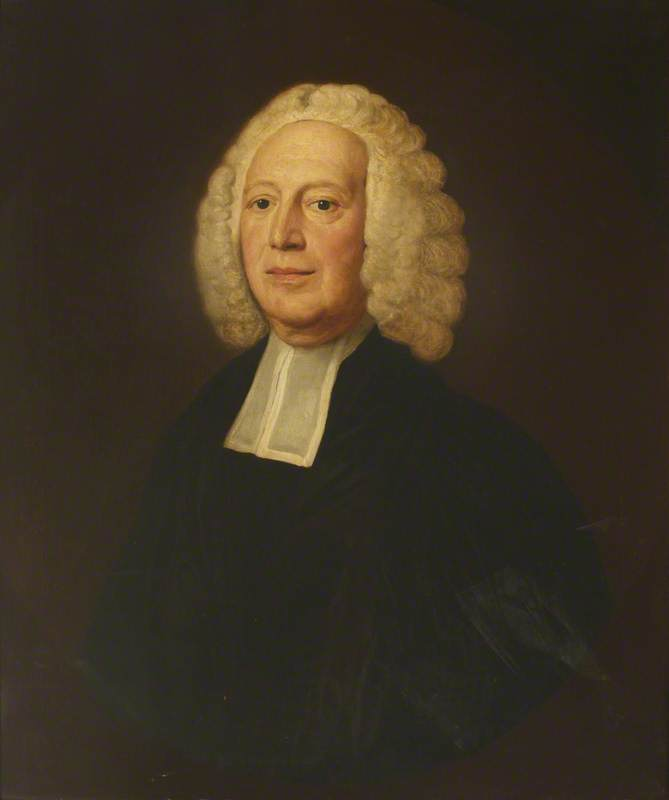
- Born: 1698
- Died: 10 August 1781 (aged 82–83)
- Education: University of Oxford (BA)

Richard Hutchins (1698 – 10 August 1781) D.D., a minister of the Church of England, was Hervey's tutor, and a very faithful member of the Oxford Methodist Society. He graduated with a BA. at Lincoln College, Oxford in 1720. He became a Fellow of the college on 8 December 1720, subrector on 6 November 1739, bursar and librarian on 6 November 1742, and rector on 9 July 1755. He died on 10 August 1781. His only publication is a Latin sermon,

Elucidatio Sexti Capitis Evangelii Secundum Johannem (1847, 8vo, page 51). "In more respects than one Dr. Hutchins continued an Oxford Methodist long after all his old friends had been dispersed."
