= Charles Isham =

English landowner and gardener (1819–1903)

Sir Charles Edmund Isham
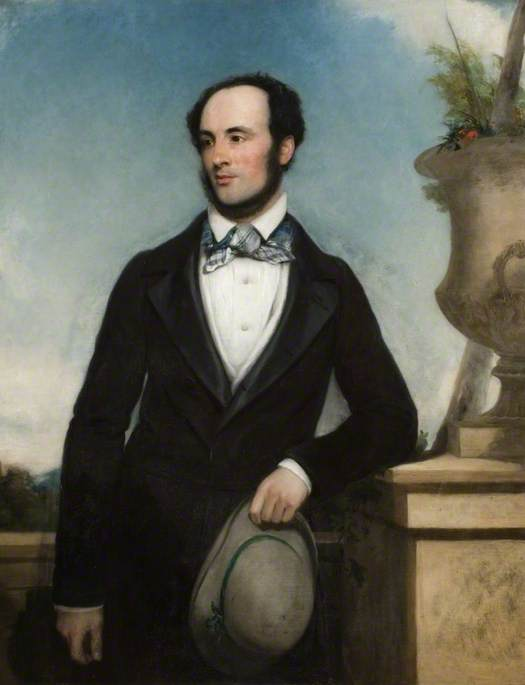
- Isham, c. 1850
- Born: 16 December 1819; Lamport Hall, Northamptonshire, England
- Died: 7 April 1903 (aged 83); Horsham, Sussex, England
- Education: Rugby School; Brasenose College, Oxford
- Occupations: Landowner, gardener
- Known for: Introducing garden gnomes to the UK
- Title: 10th Baronet Isham
- Spouse: Emily Vaughan (m. 1847–1898)
- Children: 3
- Honors: High Sheriff of Northamptonshire (1851)

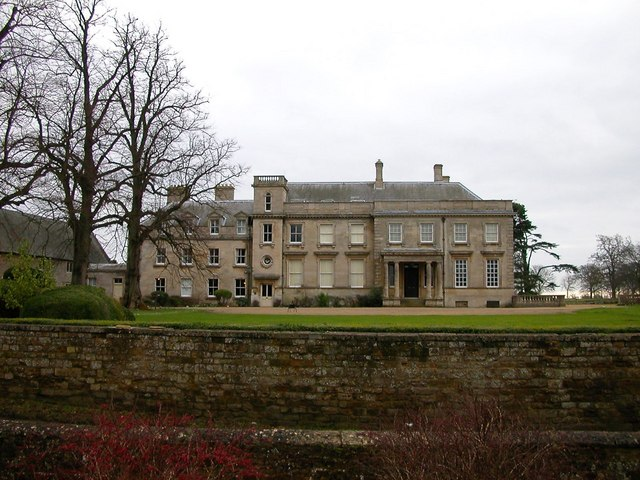
Lamport Hall

Sir Charles Edmund Isham, 10th Baronet (16 December 1819 – 7 April 1903) was an English landowner and gardener based at Lamport Hall, Northamptonshire. He is credited with beginning the tradition of garden gnomes in the United Kingdom when he introduced a number of terracotta figures from Germany in the 1840s. Nicknamed "Lampy", the only gnome of the original batch to survive is on display at Lamport Hall and insured for £1 million.

== Biography ==
Charles Edmund Isham was born on 16 December 1819 at the family estate at Lamport Hall, Northamptonshire. He was the second son of Sir Justinian Isham, 8th Baronet (1773–1845) and his wife, Mary Close (d. 1878).

Isham was educated at Rugby School and Brasenose College, Oxford. In 1846, on the death of his elder brother, he succeeded to the baronetcy. He is recorded as being the High Sheriff of Northamptonshire in 1851.

In 1847, inspired by the writings of John Claudius Loudon, landscape gardener and horticulturalist, he commenced construction of a large rockery alongside his house. It was in this rockery that he first placed gnomes from Nuremberg as ornamentation.

Isham married Emily Vaughan, daughter of Sir John Vaughan and his wife Louisa Boughton on 26 October 1847. Emily died on 6 September 1898 aged 74. Sir Charles had three daughters.

Isham died on 7 April 1903 at The Bungalow, Horsham, Sussex, at the age of 83. The baronetcy, and the entailed estate including Lamport Hall, was inherited by Sir Vere Isham, 11th Baronet, his first cousin once removed.

== Isham's collection ==
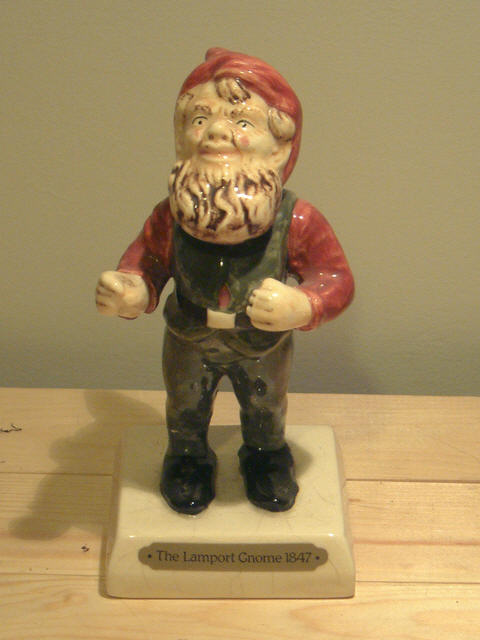
A replica of Lampy the Lamport gnome

In 1867 several extremely rare books and manuscripts were rediscovered in the library and loft of his family home. These included a fragment of Thomas Edwards' Cephalus and Procris; Narcissus which had been lost for 200 years and was the only existing part until a full copy was subsequently discovered at the Cathedral Library at Peterborough.

Also discovered were first editions of Milton's Paradise Lost and Paradise Regained in their original sheepskin bindings.

Further discoveries included:

- Emaricdulfe (1598) by E. C. Esquire
- Fidessa (1596) by Bartholomew Griffin
- Laura (1597) by Robert Tofte
- Cynthia (1598) by Richard Barnfield

For each of which only one or two other copies were known. The above four works found their way into the Britwell Court Library before being sold in February 1922 to A. S. W. Rosenbach for £3,600.

== Personal life ==
Isham was teetotal, vegetarian and a non-smoker. He opposed blood sports and enjoyed spending his time working on the rockery in his garden and looking after the employees on his estate.

Isham was a convinced spiritualist. He was a member of the British National Association of Spiritualists.

== Publications ==
- Sir Charles Isham on Spiritualism (1856)
- A Lamport Garland From the Library of Sir Charles Edmund Isham (1881)

Honorary titles
Preceded by William Bruce Stopford	High Sheriff of Northamptonshire; 1851	Succeeded by Langham Christie
Baronetage of England
Preceded by Justinian Isham	Baronet (of Lamport); 1846–1903	Succeeded by Vere Isham
