= John Morley (Rector of Lincoln College, Oxford) =

John Tatham, DD (Lincoln, 26 February 1670 – Oxford, 11 June 1731) was an Oxford college head in the 18th century.

He graduated BA from Pembroke College, Oxford in 1689. He became a Fellow of Lincoln College, Oxford in 1692. He was Rector of Lincoln College, Oxford, from 1719 until his death. He also held the living at Scotton.
