= Gyles Isham =

British actor and historian (1903–1976)

Sir Gyles Isham Bt
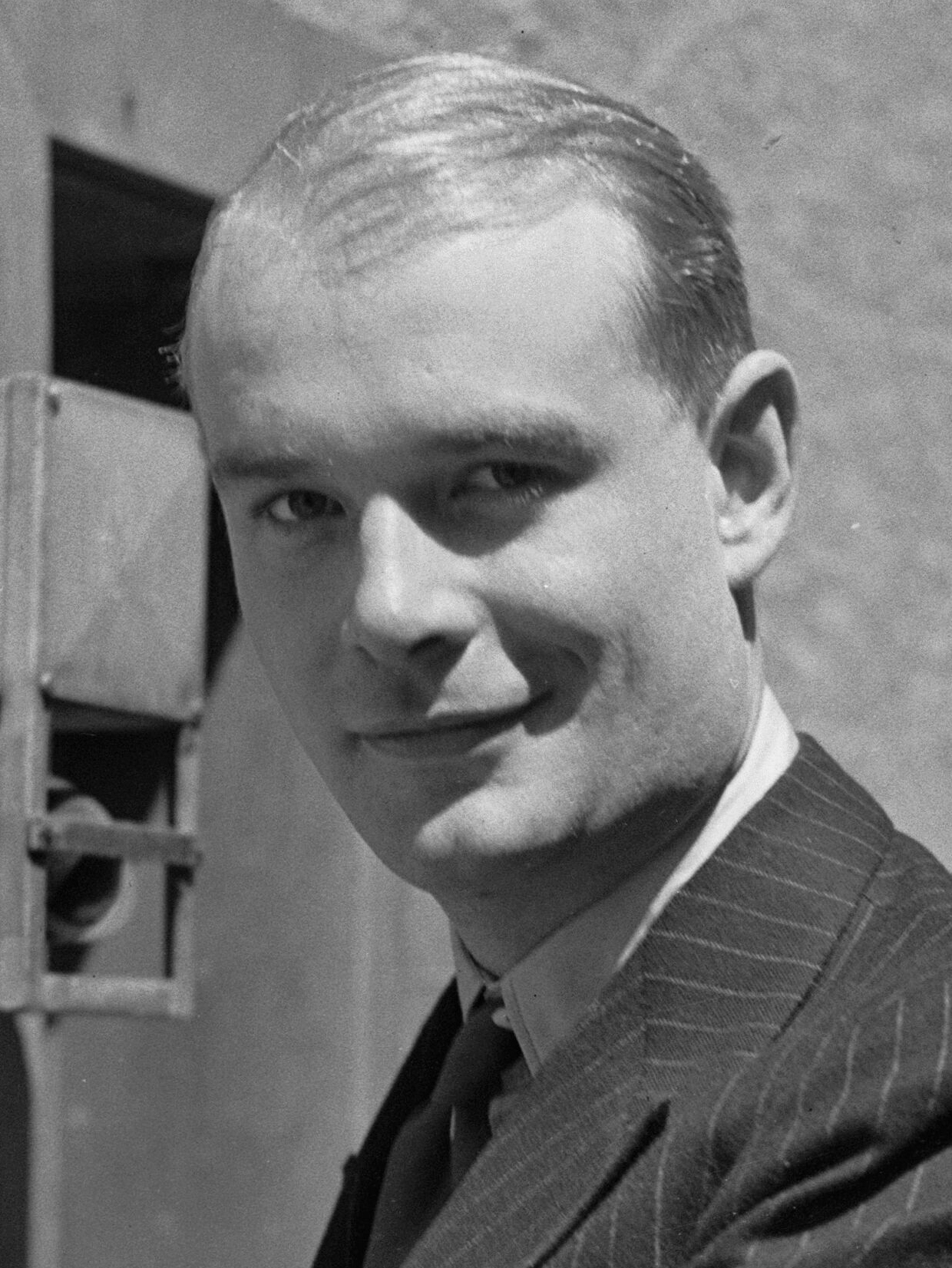
- Isham in 1935
- Born: 31 October 1903; Lamport, Northamptonshire, England
- Died: 29 January 1976 (aged 72); Northampton, England

Sir Gyles Isham, 12th Baronet (31 October 1903 – 29 January 1976) was an English aristocrat, actor, and historian.

== Life and career ==
Gyles Isham was born 31 October 1903 in Lamport, Northamptonshire, England to Sir Vere Isham, the 11th Baronet of Lamport, and his wife Millicent Vaughan. Educated at Magdalen College, Oxford, in 1926 he was President of the Oxford Union and graduated as a Bachelor of Arts (promoted to M.A. in 1930). He became an actor, appearing from 1929 to 1938 in several Shakespeare plays at the Old Vic Theatre in London, the Stratford Shakespeare Festival, and other venues. He also appeared from 1933 to 1937 in ten films, including the acclaimed Anna Karenina of 1935. Enlisting in the British Army during the Second World War, in 1940 he was commissioned as an officer into the King's Royal Rifle Corps and served in Libya in the Western Desert Campaign, by 1943 reaching the rank of lieutenant-colonel. He also succeeded in 1941, during his Libyan service, to the Baronetcy of Lamport with the death of his father, thereby becoming Sir Gyles Isham. He served after the war as Defence Secretary Officer in Palestine. He contested the 1950 General Election as Conservative Party candidate for Kettering, finishing second. Returning to his family manor at Lamport Hall, he served in 1952 as Deputy Lieutenant of Northamptonshire, was a member from 1955 to 1964 of the Northamptonshire County Council, and served in 1958 as High Sheriff of Northamptonshire. He was a trustee in 1964 of the National Portrait Gallery, and president between 1968 and 1976 of the Association of Genealogists and Researchers in Archives (AGRA), during which time he wrote several books and pamphlets on the history of Northamptonshire. He also opened Lamport Hall, the family manor, to the public for the first time in 1974 and established the Lamport Hall Trust, to which the manor passed at his death. Sir Gyles died on 29 January 1976 at the age of 72 at St. Matthew's Nursing Home, Northampton, England. Isham was homosexual, and had no children; he was succeeded as baronet by Sir Ian Isham, a distant cousin of his descended from the 7th baronet.

== Filmography ==
- Anne One Hundred (1933) as Nixon
- Purse Strings (1933) as James Willmore
- The Iron Duke (1934) as Czar of Russia
- What's in a Name? (1934) as Schultz
- Regal Cavalcade (1935) as Dining Officer
- Anna Karenina (1935) as Levin
- The Perfect Gentleman (1935) as Man (uncredited and unconfirmed)
- The House of the Spaniard (1936) as John Gilchrist
- Secret Lives (1937) as Franz Abel
- Under Secret Orders (1937) as Lt. Hans Hoffman

== Selected publications ==
- The Correspondence of Bishop Brian Duppa and Sir Justinian Isham 1650-1660, Northamptonshire Record Society, 1954.
- Sir Thomas Isham: an English collector in Rome, 1677-8,: A Selection of Pictures, Engravings, Books and Manuscripts Lent by Sir Gyles Isham, Bart., from Lamport Hall, Northampton: Exhibited at Central Art Gallery, Northampton, 12th July to August, 1969, County Borough of Northampton - Museums and Art Gallery, 1969.
- The Triangular Lodge: Rushton, Northamptonshire. Official Guide. Her Majesty's Stationery Office (HMSO). 1970.
- He also annotated the 1971 translation by Norman Marlow of The diary of Thomas Isham of Lamport (1658-81), Gregg Publishing, 343 p.

== Notes ==
Baronetage of England
Preceded by Vere Isham	Baronet (of Lamport); 1941–1976	Succeeded by Ian Isham
