= Sir Justinian Isham, 2nd Baronet =

English scholar and royalist politician

Sir Justinian Isham Bt
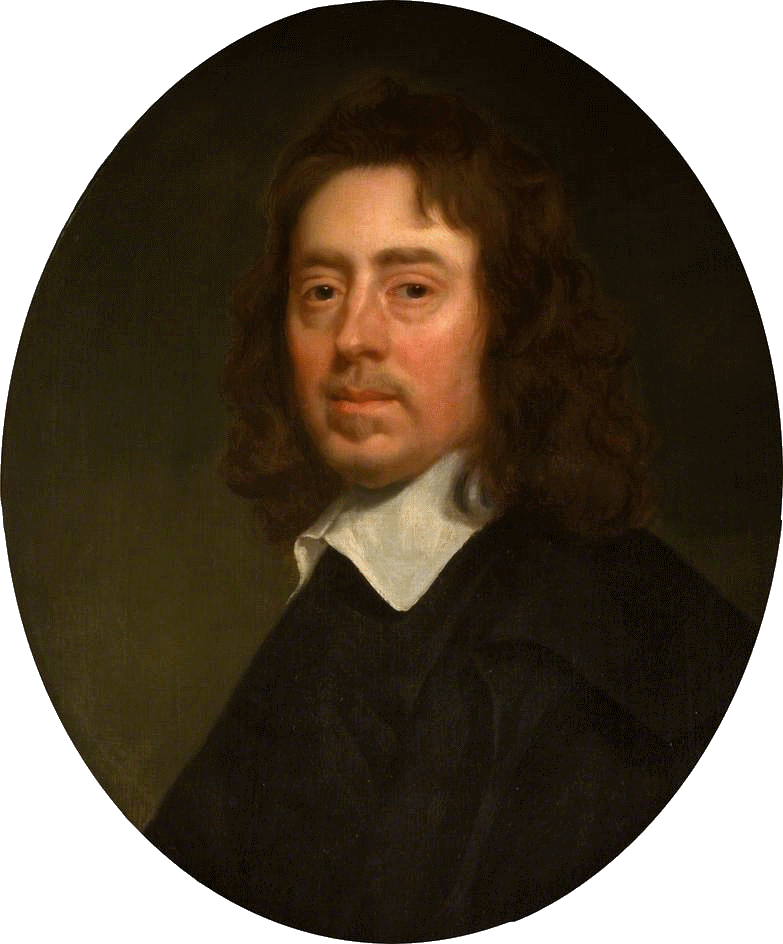
- Sir Justinian Isham I by Peter Lely
- Born: 20 July 1610
- Died: 2 March 1675

Academic background
- Education: Christ's College, Cambridge

Sir Justinian Isham, 2nd Baronet (20 July 1610 – 2 March 1675) was an English scholar and royalist politician. He was also a Member of Parliament and an early member of the Royal Society.

== Life ==
He was admitted a fellow-commoner at Christ's College, Cambridge, on 18 April 1627. Isham was a man of culture, building a library at Lamport Hall, Northamptonshire. Brian Duppa was a frequent correspondent of his; and he kept in touch with Seth Ward in Oxford. He was a patron of Alexander Ross.

Loans to the king as well as fines to the parliament had greatly injured the Isham estates, when in 1651, Sir Justinian succeeded to the Isham baronetcy. He had been in prison for a short time during 1649, as a delinquent, and he was now forced to compound for the estate of Shangton in Leicestershire. After the Restoration he was elected M.P. for Northamptonshire in the parliament which met in 1661. Gilbert Clerke dedicated to him a 1662 work of natural philosophy. With Henry Power he was elected to the Royal Society, shortly after its 1663 charter came into force.

He died at Oxford, on 2 March 1675, and is buried in the family burial place on the north side of the chancel in Lamport Church, where there is a Latin inscription to his memory.

== Family ==
He was only son of Sir John Isham (1582–1651), by his wife Judith, daughter of William Lewin, of Otterden, Kent. When he was baptised on 3 February 1610, he took his Christian name from his mother's brother, Sir Justinian Lewin, knt. Elizabeth Isham, known for her autobiography, was his sister.

Isham was married on 16 November 1634 to Jane, eldest daughter of Sir John Garrard, baronet, of Lamer, Hertfordshire; but his wife died in childbirth on 4 March 1638. Isham then wooed Dorothy Osborne; but she found him pompous.

Isham's second wife, whom he married in 1653, was Vere, daughter of Thomas, Lord Leigh of Stoneleigh, by Mary, daughter of Sir Thomas Egerton. Four children by her survived him: Sir Thomas Isham, 3rd Baronet; Sir Justinian Isham, 4th Baronet (d. 1730); Mary (d. 1679), who married Sir Marmaduke Dayrell of Castle Camps, Cambridgeshire; and Vere, an erudite young mathematician who died in 1674, aged 19. There also survived him three daughters by his first wife: Elizabeth (d. 1734), who married Sir Nicholas L'Estrange of Hunstanton, Norfolk, second baronet, and nephew of Sir Roger L'Estrange; Judith, who died unmarried, and was buried in Westminster Abbey on 22 May 1679; and Susanna, who was married on 4 May 1656 to Sir Nicholas Carew, kt.

Parliament of England
Preceded by John Crew; Sir Henry Yelverton, Bt	Member of Parliament for Northamptonshire; 1661–1675; With: George Clerke	Succeeded by Lord Burghley; George Clerke
Baronetage of England
Preceded by John Isham	Baronet (of Lamport); 1651–1675	Succeeded by Thomas Isham
