= Sir John Isham, 1st Baronet =

Sir John Isham Bt (1582-1651) was High Sheriff of Northamptonshire and created the 1st hereditary Baronet of Lamport by King Charles I.

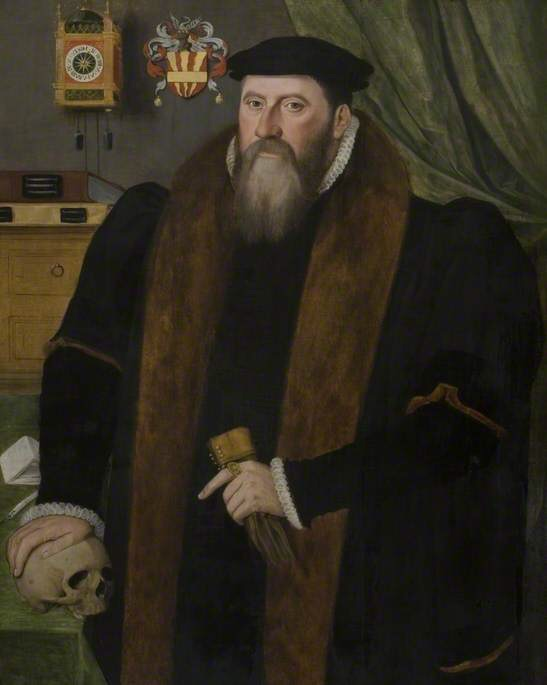
John Isham of Lamport Hall. Circle of Gerlach Flicke (1495–1558). c.1567.

Isham was born on 27 July 1582, and was the only son of Thomas Isham. He was named after his grandfather, John Isham of Lamport Hall (1525-1595), who had made enough of a fortune as a London wool merchant to acquire an extensive estate near Lamport, Northamptonshire where in 1568 he built a manor house.

Isham succeeded to the Lamport estate in 1605 after the death of his father. In 1607 he married Judith Lewin, the daughter of William Lewin (d.1598), a Doctor of Laws and Judge of the Prerogative Court of Canterbury. They had three children: Elizabeth, Justinian and Judith.

On 29 March 1608, Isham was knighted by James I. In 1611 he was appointed to High Sheriff of Northamptonshire, a post that his grandfather, the elder John Isham, had held 30 years before. Wealthy and successful, Isham became a member of the aristocracy when Charles I on 30 May 1627 created him the first hereditary Baronet of Lamport. The title was probably purchased, as both Charles I and James I before him had used baronetcies as a means of raising funds, first for the settlement and pacification of Northern Ireland and later for the settlement of Nova Scotia in the Colonies.

Sir John Isham died on 8 July 1651 in Lamport, and was buried there with his wife (who had died in 1625). The title of baronet subsequently passed down to his only son Justinian Isham. His daughter Elizabeth Isham is known for her diary, which is one of the earliest known examples of an autobiography written by a woman.

Baronetage of England
New creation	Baronet of Lamport; 1627–1651	Succeeded by Justinian Isham
