= Isham =

Village in Northamptonshire, England

Coordinates: 52.3529°N 0.7024°W

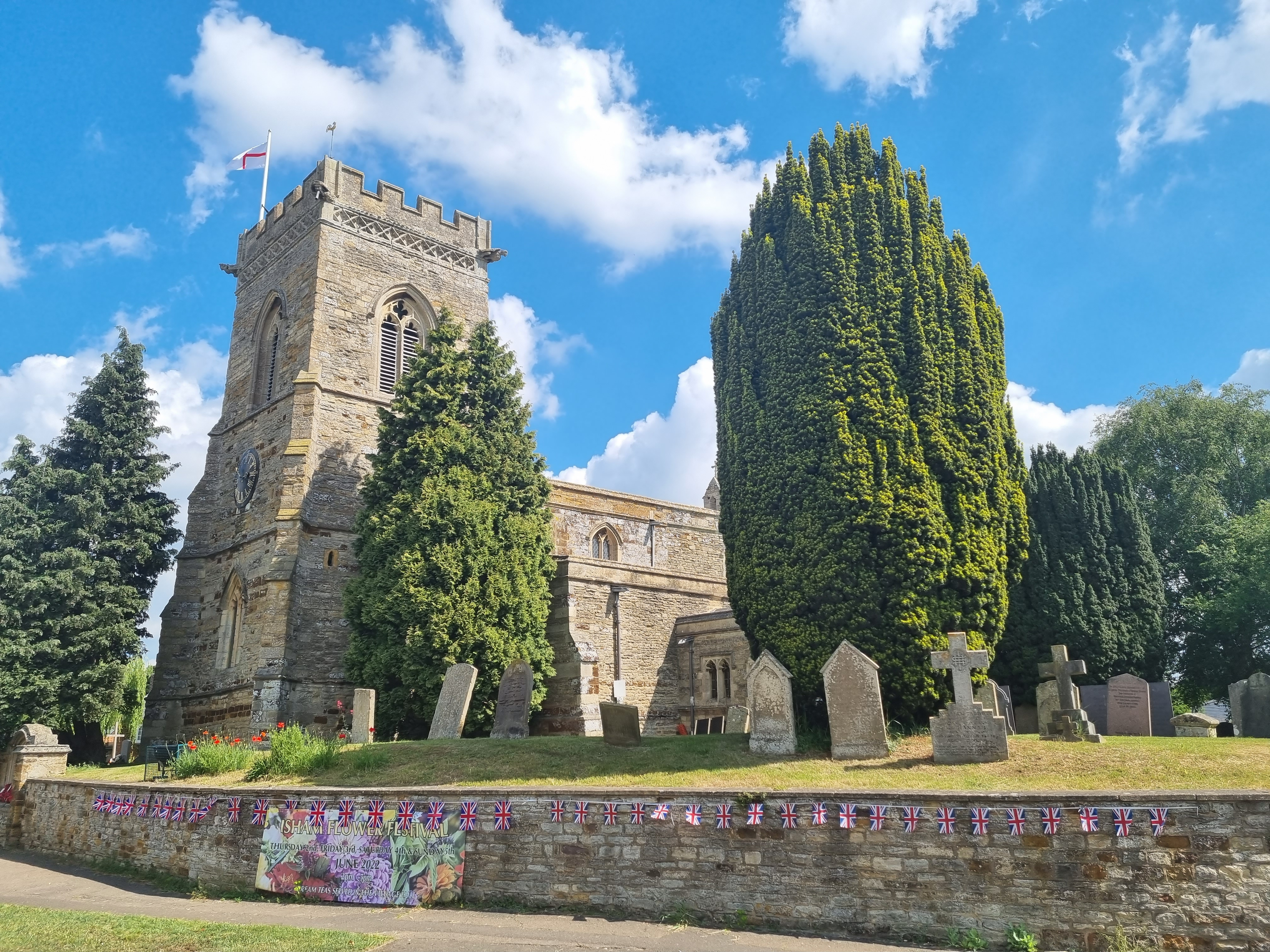
- St Peter's Church, Isham 2022

- Location within Northamptonshire
- Population: 771 (2011 census)
- OS grid reference: SP8873
- Unitary authority: North Northamptonshire
- Ceremonial county: Northamptonshire
- Region: East Midlands
- Country: England
- Sovereign state: United Kingdom
- Post town: Kettering
- Postcode district: NN14
- Dialling code: 01536
- Police: Northamptonshire
- Fire: Northamptonshire
- Ambulance: East Midlands
- UK Parliament: Daventry

Isham is a village and civil parish in Northamptonshire, England. It is on the A509 road, three miles south of Kettering and a mile to the west of Burton Latimer. The River Ise is to the east of the village. Administratively, it forms part of North Northamptonshire. It was previously in the Borough of Wellingborough until 2021. At the time of the 2011 census, the parish's population was 772 people.

The villages name means 'River Ise homestead/village'.

A bypass west of the village is planned by the county council. HMS Isham, a Ham class minesweeper was named after the village in 1954.

== Amenities ==
Isham has several churches, the Isham Church of England primary school and a pub ( Lilacs Inn).

Isham Cricket Club, which plays in Division 1 of the Northamptonshire County League, is based on the outskirts of the village between Isham and Orlingbury. Past players have included Stephen Fleming (New Zealand national cricket team captain) and Johann Myburgh (SA Titans). The village is home to a wild bird sanctuary known as Safewings, which cares for injured birds.

== See also ==
- Isham and Burton Latimer railway station
- Isham Baronets
