= Isham baronets =

Title in the Baronetage of England

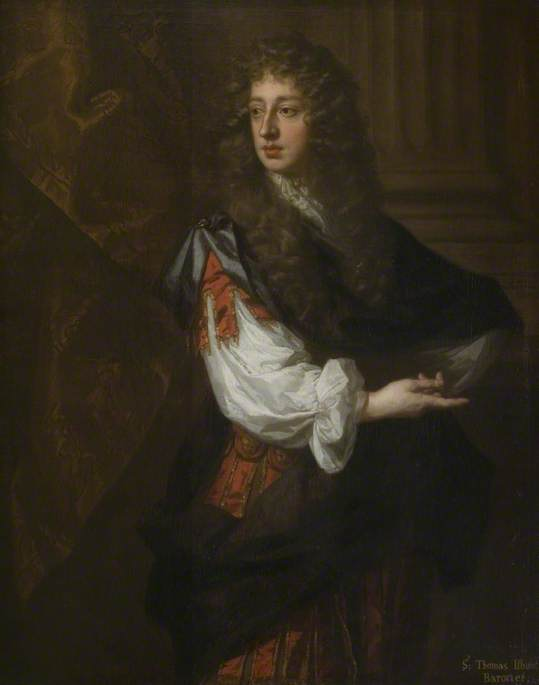
Sir Thomas Isham, 3rd Baronet by Mary Beale

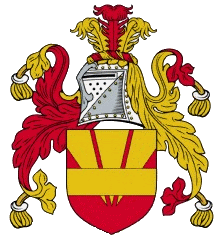
Isham family coat of arms

The Isham Baronetcy, of Lamport in the County of Northampton, is a title in the Baronetage of England.

== Isham baronets, of Lamport (1627) ==
=== History of the baronetcy ===
The Isham baronetcy was created on 30 May 1627 for John Isham, High Sheriff of Northamptonshire. He was succeeded by his son Justinian, the second Baronet, who fought as a Royalist in the Civil War and sat as member of parliament for Northamptonshire after the Restoration. Justinian II, the fourth Baronet represented Northampton and Northamptonshire in the House of Commons while Justinian III and Edmund, the fifth and sixth Baronets, both represented Northamptonshire. Sir Gyles Isham, the twelfth Baronet, in 1958 was High Sheriff of Northamptonshire.

The family surname is pronounced "Eye-shum", and derives from the village of Isham, Northamptonshire. The family coat of arms are described as, "gules, a fesse wavy, and in chief three piles, also wavy, points meeting in fesse, argent". The family seat is Lamport Hall in Northamptonshire.

=== Succession ===
- Sir John Isham, 1st Baronet (1582–1651)
- Sir Justinian Isham, 2nd Baronet (1610–1675)
- Sir Thomas Isham, 3rd Baronet (1656–1681)
- Sir Justinian Isham, 4th Baronet (1658–1730)
- Sir Justinian Isham, 5th Baronet (1687–1737)
- Sir Edmund Isham, 6th Baronet (1690–1772)
- Sir Justinian Isham, 7th Baronet (1740–1818)
- Sir Justinian Isham, 8th Baronet (1773–1845)
- Sir Justinian Vere Isham, 9th Baronet (1816–1846)
- Sir Charles Edmund Isham, 10th Baronet (1819–1903)
- Sir Vere Isham, 11th Baronet (1862–1941)
- Sir Gyles Isham, 12th Baronet (1903–1976)
- Sir Ian Vere Gyles Isham, 13th Baronet (1923–2009)
- Sir Norman Murray Crawford Isham, OBE, 14th Baronet (1930–2021)
- Sir Richard Leonard Vere Isham, 15th Baronet (b. 1958)

The heir apparent to the baronetcy is the 15th Baronet's eldest son, Angus David Vere Isham (born 1992). His heir presumptive is his younger brother, Charles Vere Ian Isham (born 1996).

== See also ==
- Edmund Isham (academic administrator)
- Elizabeth Isham
- Euseby Isham
- Zacheus Isham
