= Edmund Isham (academic administrator) =

Edmund Isham D.D. (1744?–1817) was an academic administrator at the University of Oxford.

Isham was elected Warden (head) of All Souls College, Oxford in 1793, a post he held until his death in 1817. While Warden at All Souls College, Isham was also Vice-Chancellor of Oxford University from 1797 until 1798.

A portrait of Isham was painted by William Owen (1769–1825) and a mezzotint engraving was produced by Samuel William Reynolds (1773–1835) in 1810.

== See also ==
- Euseby Isham, Rector of Lincoln College, Oxford, 1731–55

Academic offices
Preceded by John Tracy, 7th Viscount Tracy	Warden of All Souls College, Oxford; 1793–1817	Succeeded by Hon. Edward Legge
Preceded by Scrope Berdmore	Vice-Chancellor of Oxford University; 1797–1798	Succeeded by Michael Marlow
