= Lamport Hall =

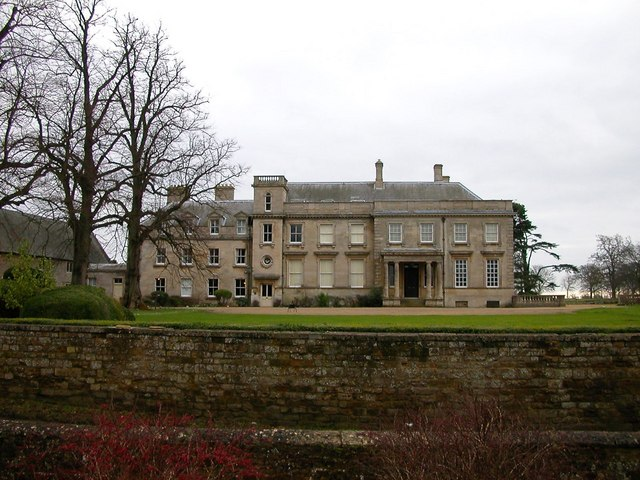

- Location within Northamptonshire
- 52°21′48″N 0°53′14″W
- Type: Country House
- Location: Lamport
- OS grid reference: SP 75883 74504

History
- Built: 1655–1741
- Rebuilt: 1842

Site notes
- Area: West Northamptonshire

Listed Building – Grade I
- Official name: Lamport Hall
- Designated: 2 November 1954
- Reference no.: 1054842

Lamport Hall in Lamport, Northamptonshire is a fine example of a Grade I listed building. It was developed from a Tudor manor but is now notable for its classical frontage. The Hall contains an outstanding collection of books, paintings and furniture. The building includes The High Room with a magnificent ceiling by William Smith. It also has a library with 16th-century volumes and an early 19th-century cabinet room with Neapolitan cabinets which depict mythological paintings on glass. It is open to the public.

Lamport Hall was the home of the Isham family from 1560 to 1976. Sir Charles Isham, 10th Baronet is credited with beginning the tradition of garden gnomes in the United Kingdom when he introduced a number of terracotta figures from Germany in the 1840s.

== History ==
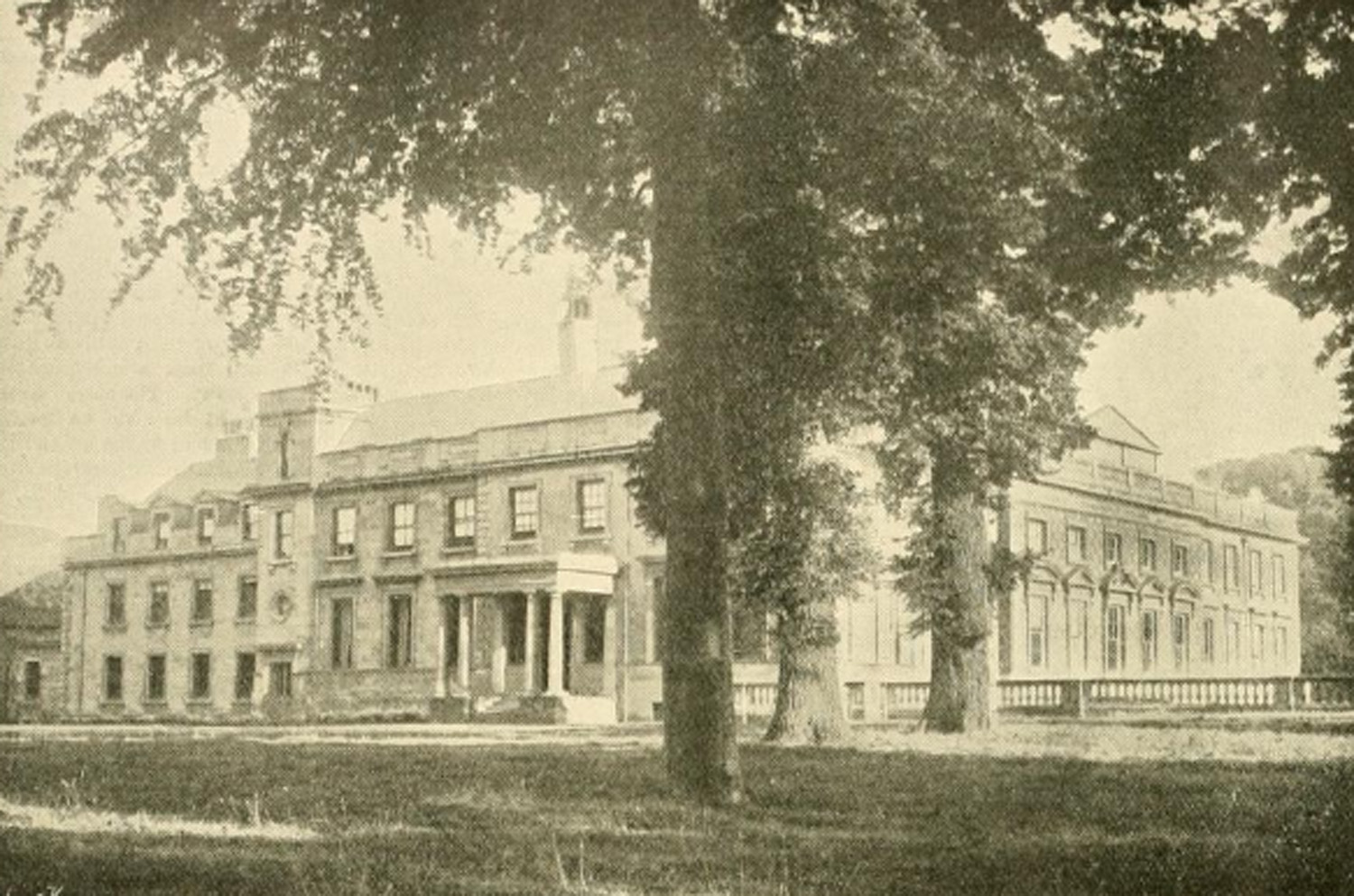
Lamport Hall in 1898 when it was owned by Sir Charles Isham.

In 1568 John Isham, a wealthy wool merchant, built a manor house on the Lamport Estate. His grandson, also named John, became the first baronet in 1627 during the reign of Charles I. He extended the house considerably. However, the only remains of this structure is a section of the present stable wing.

It was Sir Justinian Isham who built the main existing building. In 1655 he commissioned John Webb, a pupil of Inigo Jones, to design a large two-story home. The next major additions were to the south-west front and the north. These were completed in 1741. The gates on the main road date from 1824 and were designed by Henry Hakewill

In 1842 further major rebuilding of the south east front was completed, and later Sir Charles Isham commissioned the building of a new façade with porch to the north-west front, which is now the distinctive main entrance to the Hall. This was completed in 1862. The tower was built about the same time.

By about 1950 the house had considerably deteriorated, and the then owner Sir Gyles Isham undertook major renovation works and allowed the ground floor to be opened to the public in 1974. When he died in 1976 he left the building and its contents to the Lamport Hall Preservation Trust, who care for the Hall and Gardens today.

In 2021 the trust caused controversy by advertising for musicians to perform for no fee at a dining event in the garden, although they did offer the musicians a hamper for performing. The hall trust released an official apology, explaining it was meant as a showcase for amateur musicians.

== Sir Charles Isham ==
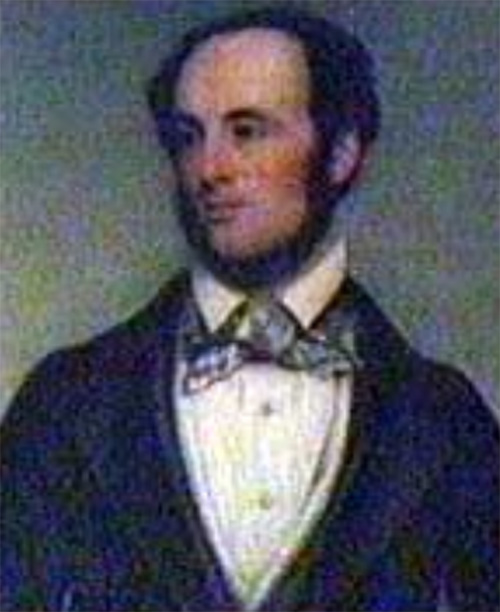
Sir Charles Isham c. 1850.

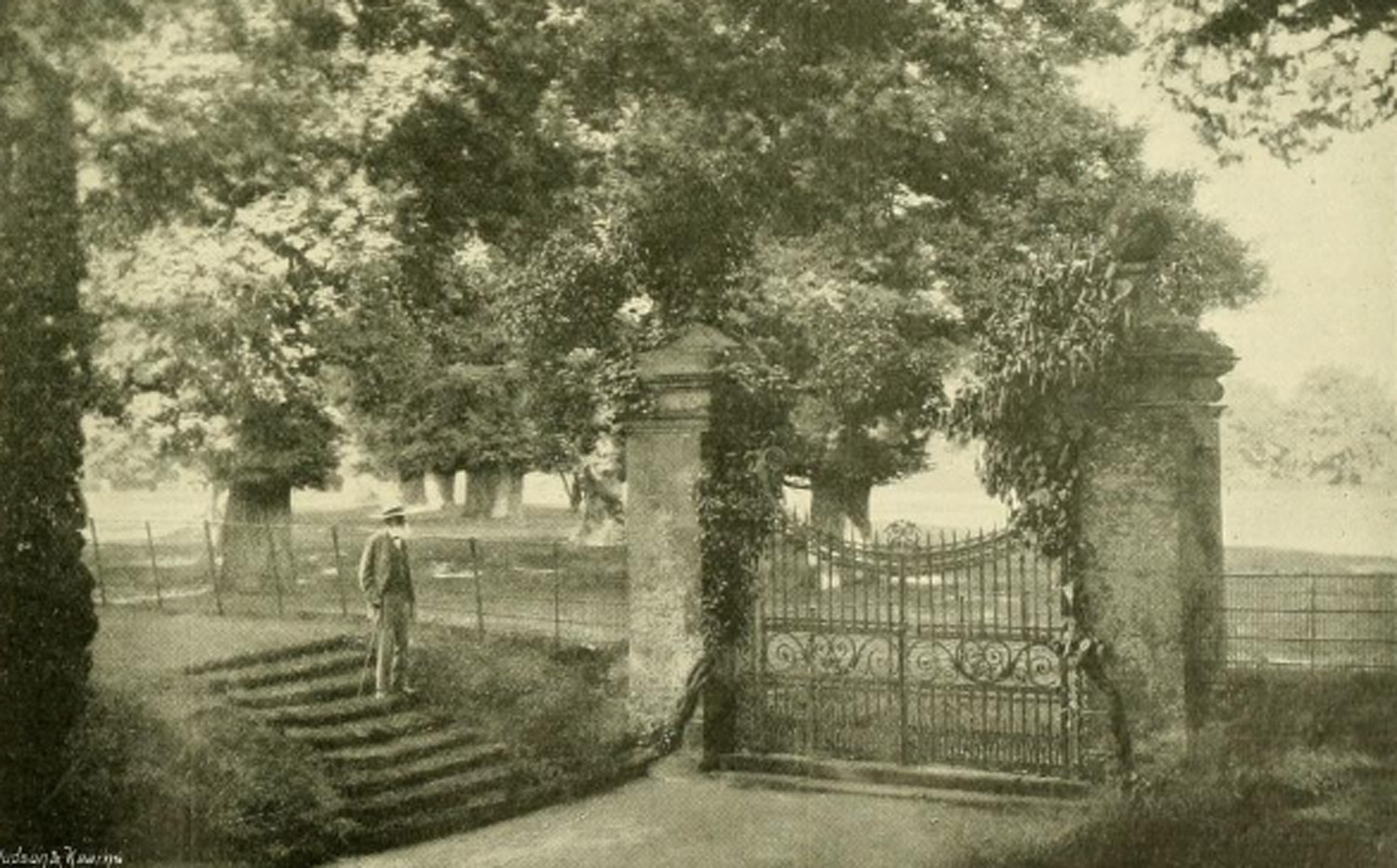
Sir Charles Isham near the gates at Lamport Hall when he was aged about 80.

Charles Isham inherited Lamport Hall at about the age of 26 in 1846 when his elder brother Justinian died. He had a particular interest in gardening and his garden featured in many of the journals of that day. Of particular interest to many of the journalists was the rockery which still exists today. Some of the descriptions of this feature were as follows.

In 1872 the Journal of Horticulture, Cottage Gardener and Country Gentleman made the following comment.

This rockwork is the great feature of the gardening at Lamport, and is a striking evidence of Sir Charles Isham's fine taste and wonderful patience. The whole is his own handiwork, and has occupied a period of two and twenty years to bring it to its present high perfection.

In 1897 the Gardeners Chronicle said

It may be said here that every stone of which the structure is composed has been placed in position by the owner himself, or by his direction, and in his presence. He has done the planting and no other person has anything to do with it unless by his instruction ... We should have been none the wiser had Sir Charles not explained that he had chiseled a small hole through the centre of the stone, and put soil into it, so that the roots of the plant could by that means reach the ground through the stone. No plant that grows quickly is a favorite for this structure. Everything is in miniature, and if the plants are not so naturally, then their cultivation is directed to that end. It is full of plant curiosities. A stunted individual that refuses to make free growth is just the kind of plant that is sought. Dwarf Conifers form one of its features, and Sir Charles has been at some trouble to procure them. Some of them are known to be upwards of seventy years old, and have not made more than 3 feet natural growth.

This rockery was particularly noted for the gnomes that it housed. The magazine called The Garden contained the following description of them.

The caves and recesses with the fairy miners are another distinctive feature. These miniature figures (only a few inches high) are in various attitudes and in strange association with the dwarf trees. In one section they are on strike, hands in pockets, with a general aspect of disdain and indignation.

Photos of the rockery and gnomes are shown in the gallery below.

One of the gnomes in this remarkable rockery survives and is on view at Lamport Hall today. A photo of the replica of this gnome is shown below.

== The Library ==
In 1867 a number of rare volumes of Elizabethan prose and poetry were found in an attic. The story of the discovery was told on its centenary in the words of bookseller, Charles Edmond who observed the discovery would "warm the heart of the most cold-blooded bibliomaniac." These included first editions of John Milton's Paradise Lost and Paradise Regained. bound in sheepskin.

== In popular culture ==
Lamport Hall was used to depict Clarence House in the Netflix series The Crown. The exterior was also used to double for the stables at Windsor Castle.

== Image gallery: The rockery and gnomes in 1897 ==
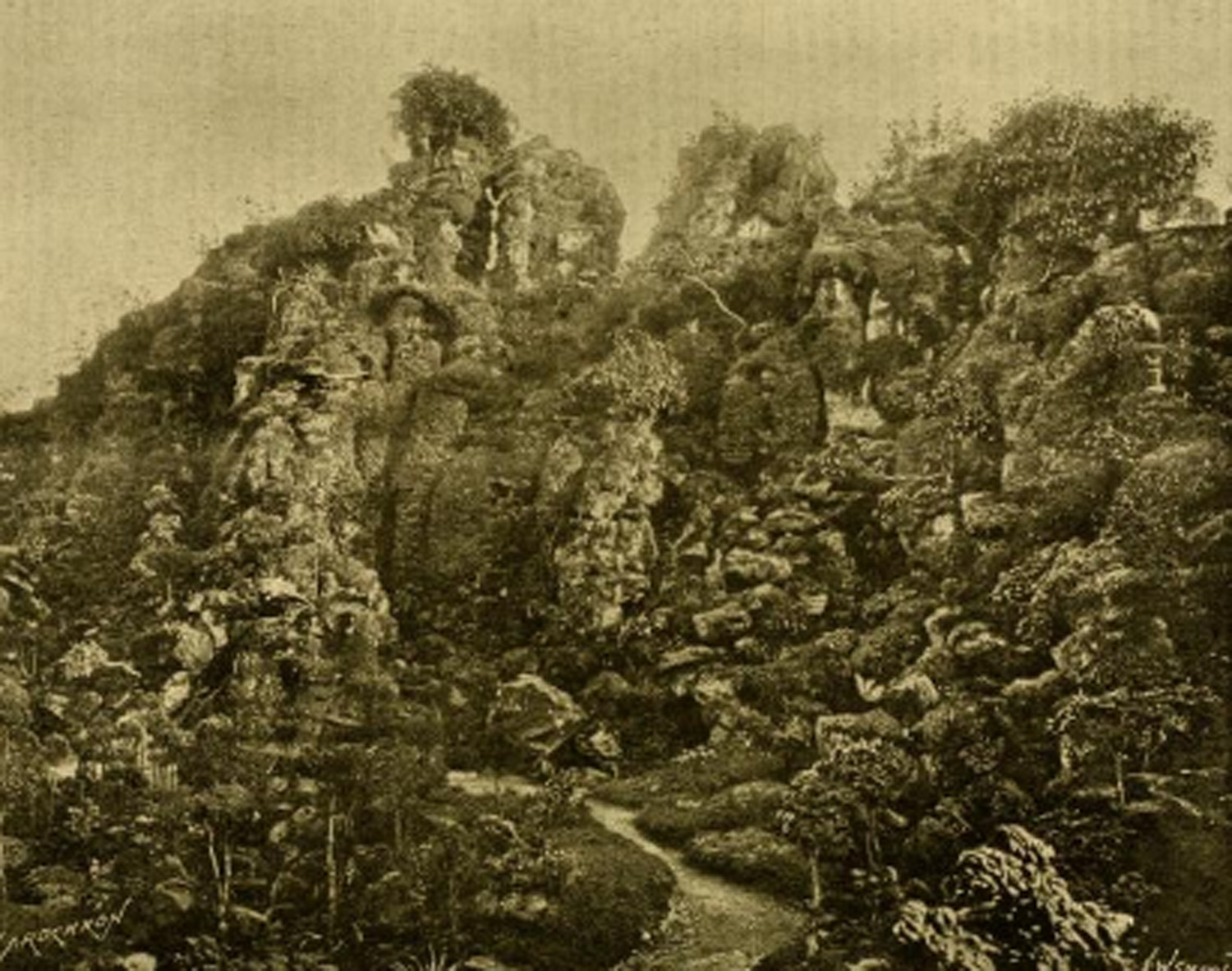
The rockery in 1897 showing the miniature plants

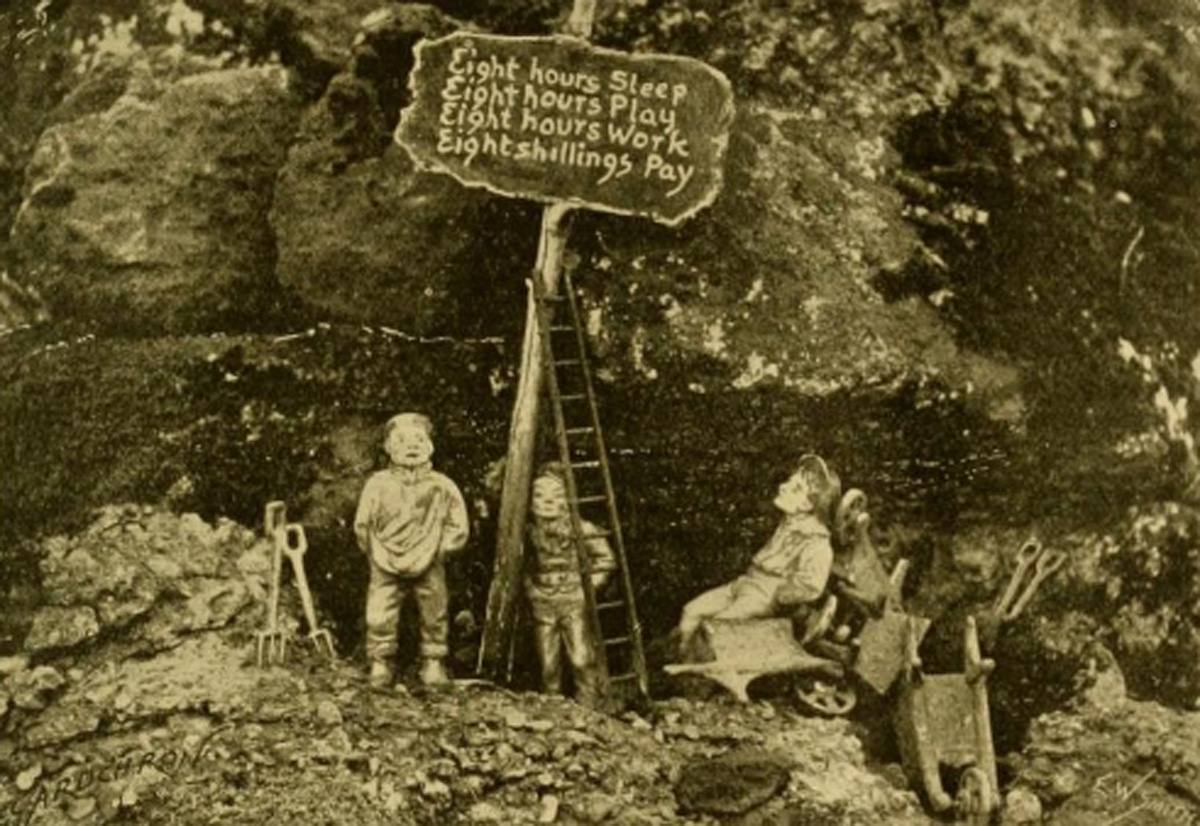
A group of gnomes who represent miners on strike in 1897

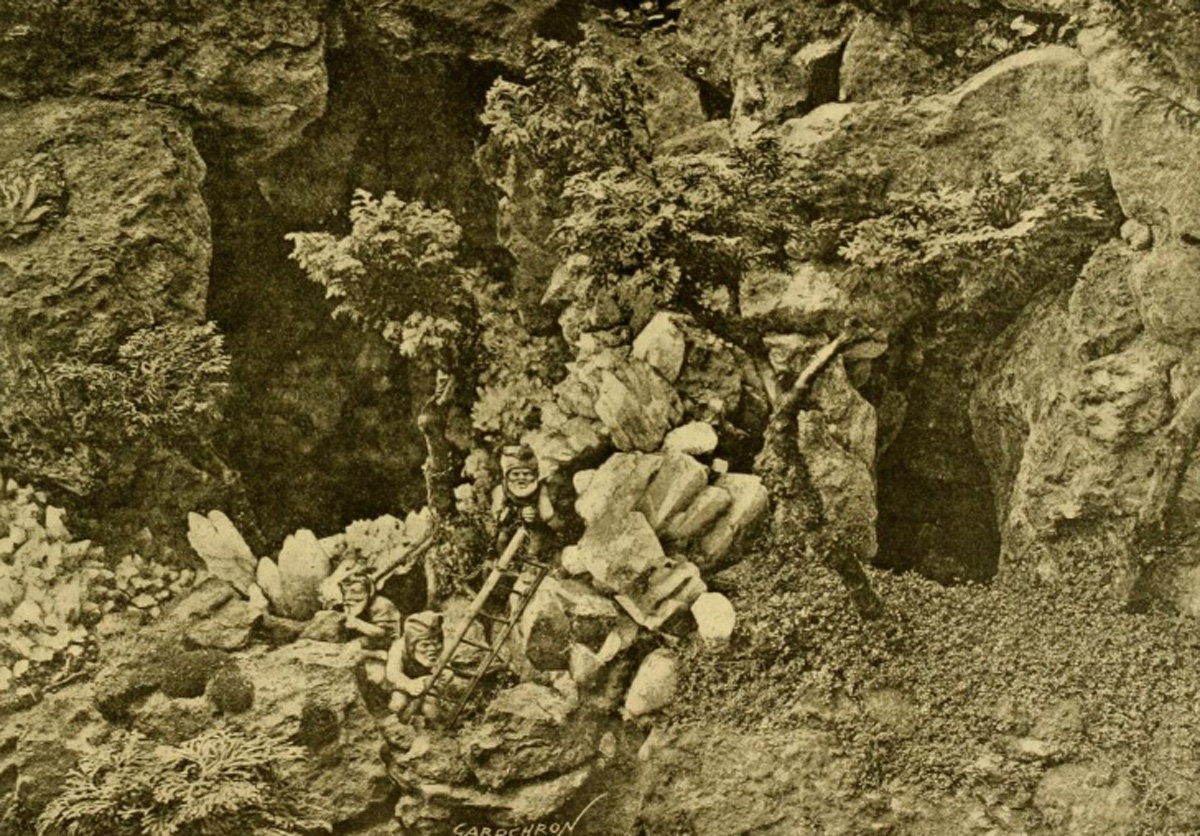
Gnomes on the rockery who are engaged in mining activities in 1897

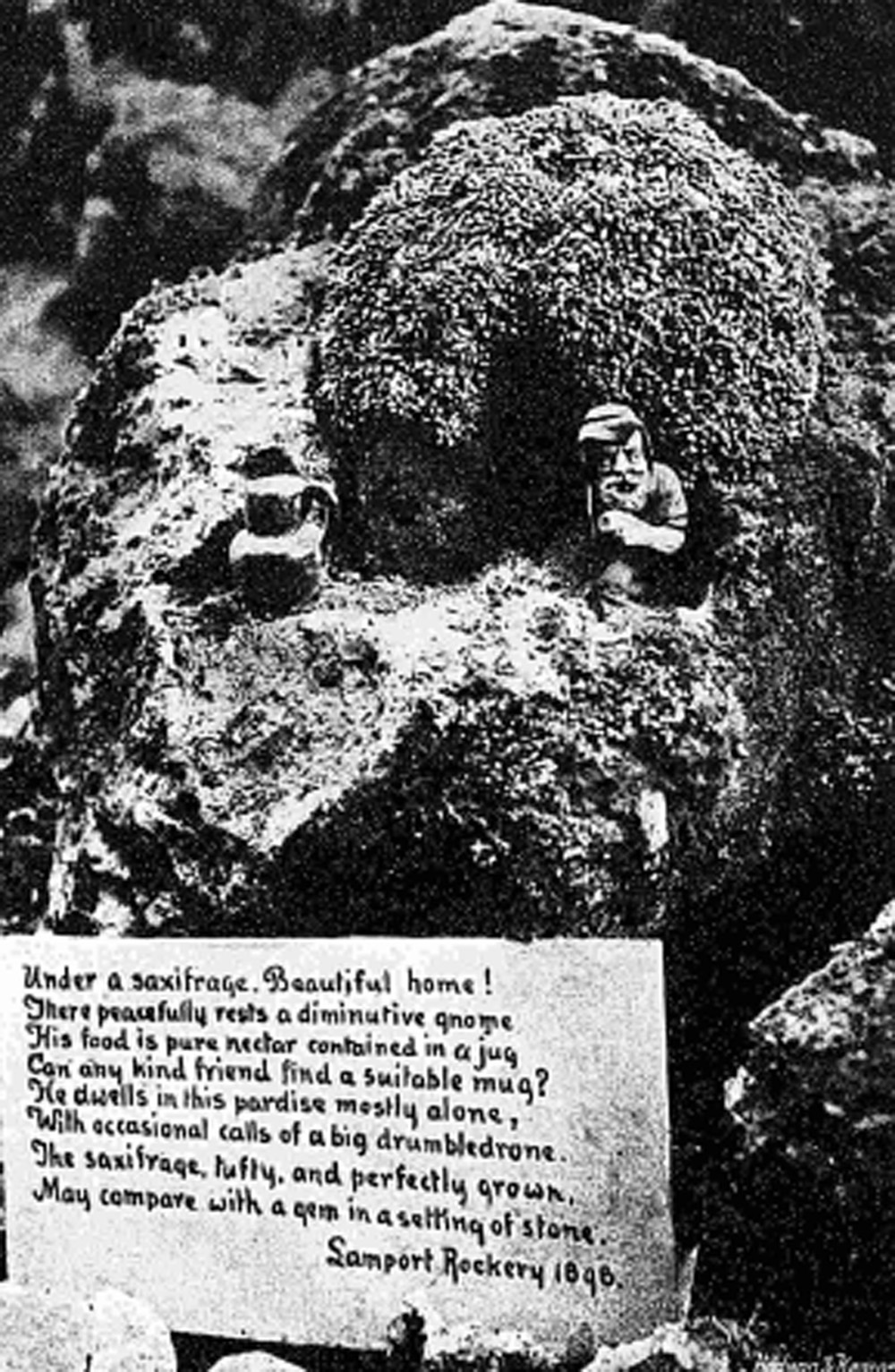
Gnomes in the rockery in 1898 with accompanying story written by Sir Charles Isham

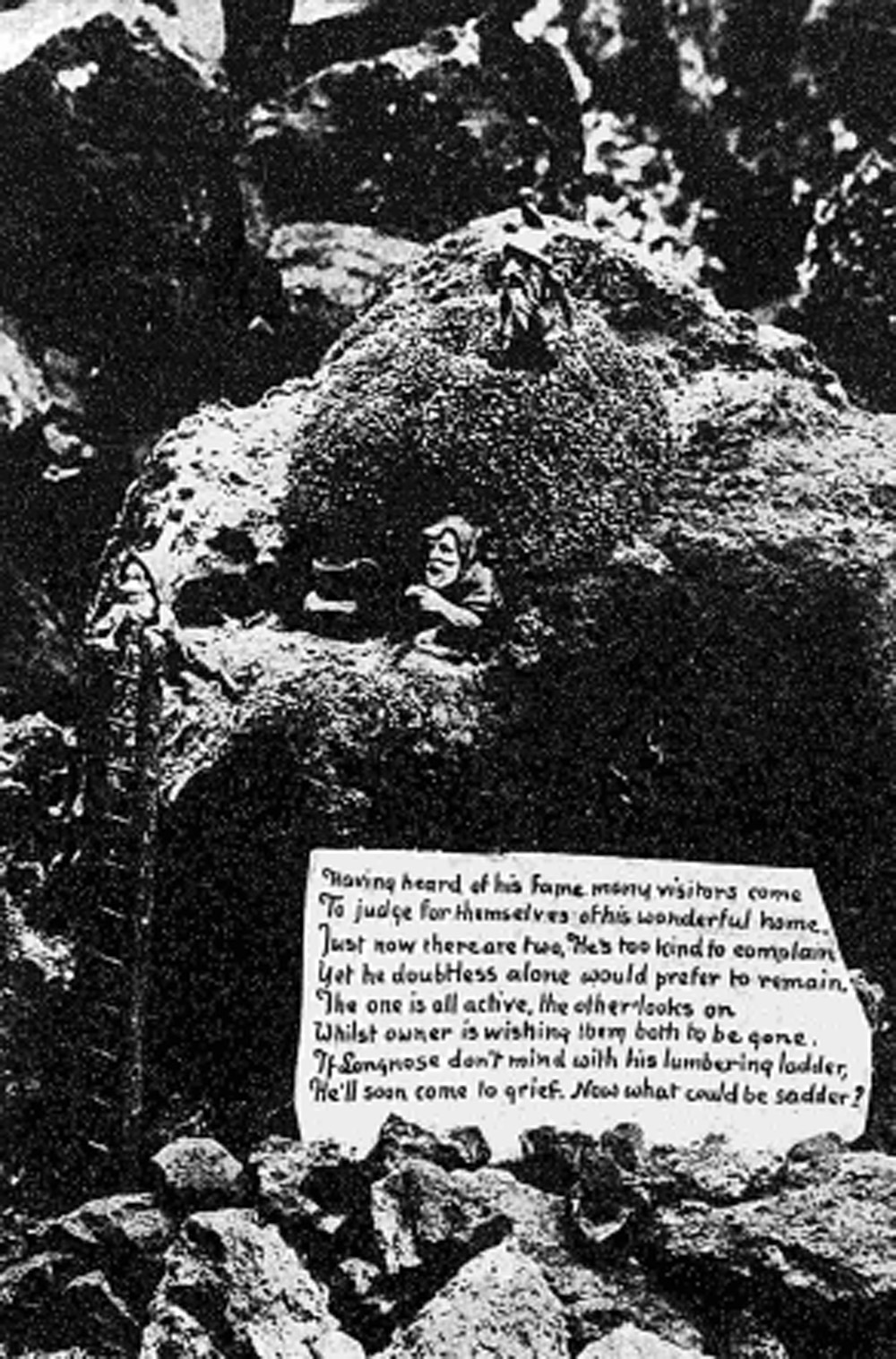
Gnomes in the rockery in 1898 with accompanying story by Sir Charles Isham

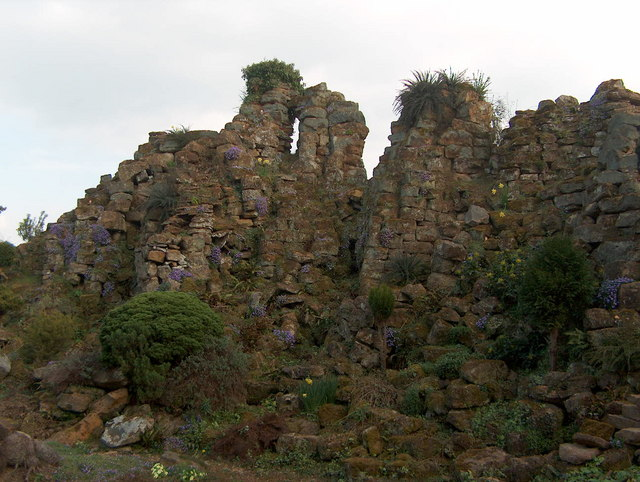
The rockery today, which can be seen at Lamport Hall

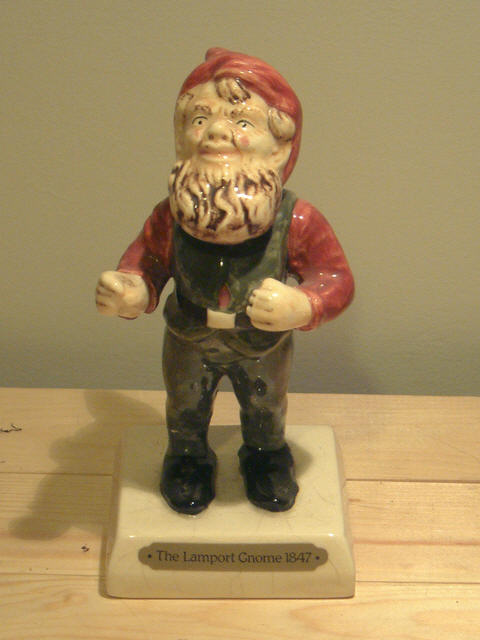
A replica of Lampy the Lamport gnome, which is the only surviving gnome

== See also ==
Isham baronets
