= Lamport, Northamptonshire =

Village in Northamptonshire, England

Coordinates: 52.3634°N 0.8927°W

Lamport
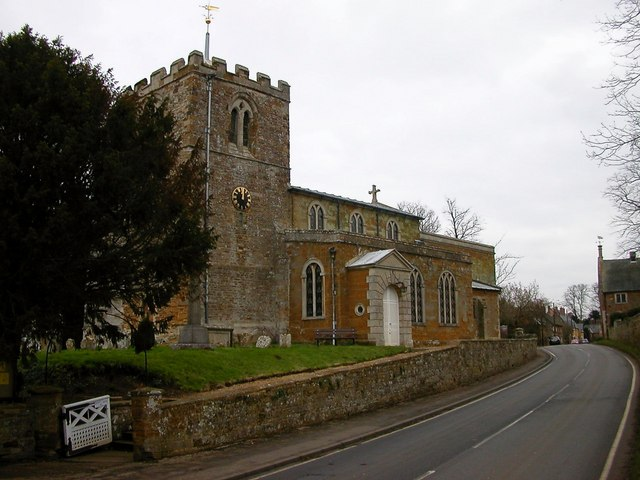
- All Saints Church, Lamport

- Location within Northamptonshire
- Population: 225 (2011)
- OS grid reference: SP7574
- Unitary authority: West Northamptonshire
- Ceremonial county: Northamptonshire
- Region: East Midlands
- Country: England
- Sovereign state: United Kingdom
- Post town: Northampton
- Postcode district: NN6
- Dialling code: 01604
- Police: Northamptonshire
- Fire: Northamptonshire
- Ambulance: East Midlands
- UK Parliament: Kettering

Lamport is a village and civil parish in West Northamptonshire, England. The village is on the A508, about 8 miles (13 km) south of Market Harborough and 8 miles (13 km) north of Northampton. Nearby is Lamport Hall. At the time of the 2001 census, the parish's population was 207 people, including Hanging Houghton and increasing to 225 at the 2011 Census.

The name of the village means 'Long town'.

Between 1859 and 1960, the village was served by Lamport railway station just north of the village running trains south to Northampton and north to Market Harborough. This is now part of the heritage Northampton & Lamport Railway, but as of 2018 the tracks have not yet been rebuilt as far as Lamport.

The parish Church of All Saints is a Grade I listed building. It has a medieval tower but the remainder was built in the 17th, 18th and 19th centuries. The 19th century part is the south vestry, designed by G.F. Bodley. The church contains monuments to members of the Isham family who lived at Lamport Hall from 1560 to 1976. Lamport Hall, the seat of the Isham baronets for around 350 years, stands opposite the church.

The Carnegie Medal-winning author Denys Watkins-Pitchford, who wrote under the pseudonym BB, was born in Lamport; his father was rector.

== Iron Ore Quarrying ==
The first iron ore quarry at Lamport was north of the village. It was close to the Draughton Road, on the west side of that road. It was connected to the railway by a standard gauge steam operated tramway. The junction was at the north end of the station. The ore was taken by the tramway and railway to blast furnaces at Finedon. This quarry operated from 1882 to 1890. Its position is marked by a crescent shaped depression in a field. The tramway's engine shed remains.

Ore was quarried close to Hanging Houghton and Scaldwell from about 1912. By 1924 these quarries were working close to the junction of the main Northampton to Lamport road and the road to Scaldwell. The ore was at that time taken a short distance by narrow gauge (3 feet) tramway and then aerial ropeway to sidings on the railway between Brixworth and Hanging Houghton. This quarry to the north and east of the road junction operated until 1927 and again from 1936 to 1963. The narrow gauge tramway was replaced by a standard gauge line in 1942 which operated direct to the sidings without the need to tranship the ore onto the aerial ropeway. During this time the working face moved gradually northwards just to the east of the main road and Lamport Hall until the final workings were close to the village. In 1963 the final gullet was actually in the parish of Scaldwell, but it was very close to Lamport village to the west of the Lamport to Scaldwell road. Steam and later diesel quarrying machines were used and in 1942 an electric dragline was introduced. The tramways were worked by steam locomotives. The tramways and quarries have been landscaped and little is now visible except that the level of the fields quarried is lower than the roads.

== Fitness programme ==
In 2017 a 3-step fitness programme was launched at Lamport Manor for people over-50.
