= Tresham baronets =

Extinct baronetcy in the Baronetage of England

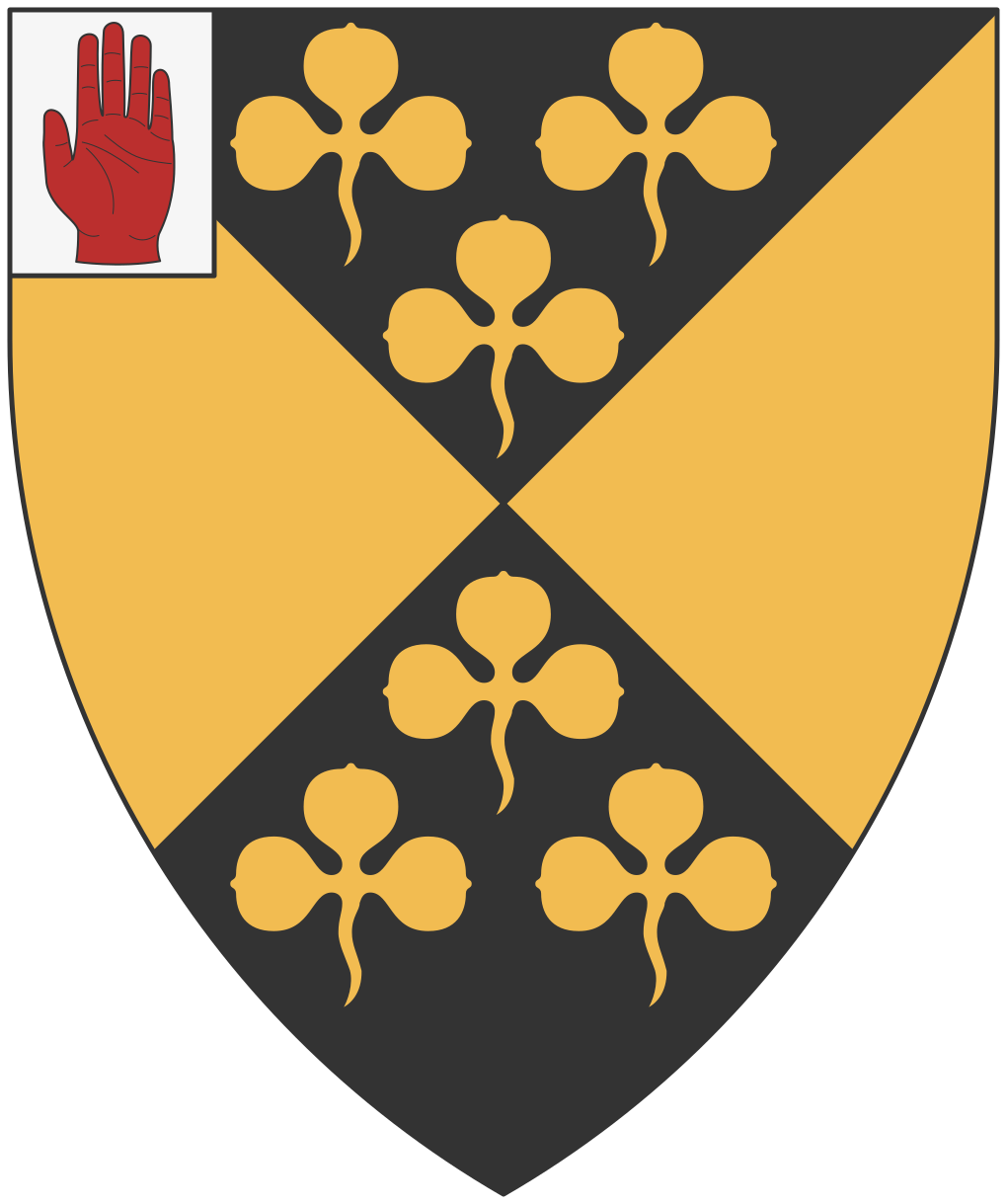
Arms of Tresham of Rushton

The Tresham Baronetcy, of Rushton in the County of Northamptonshire, was a title in the Baronetage of England.

It was created on 29 June 1611 for Lewis Tresham. He was the son of Sir Thomas Tresham, the great-grandson of Sir Thomas Tresham and the younger brother of Francis Tresham. As a member of a prominent Roman Catholic family, Lewis was fined for recusancy in the reign of James I.

The Treshams were Northamptonshire landowners, owning Lyveden New Bield at Aldwincle, and other manors at Great Houghton, Hannington, Pilton, Rushton and Sywell.

The title was inherited by Lewis' younger brother, William, who fought on the Royalist side in the English Civil War as Colonel of the English regiment in Flanders. The title became extinct on the death of the second Baronet in c. 1642.

== Tresham baronets, of Rushton (1611) ==
- Sir Lewis Tresham, 1st Baronet (c. 1575–1639)
- Sir William Tresham, 2nd Baronet (died c. 1642)

Baronetage of England
Preceded by Willoughby baronets	Tresham baronets 29 June 1611	Succeeded by Brudenell baronets
