= Rushton Hall =

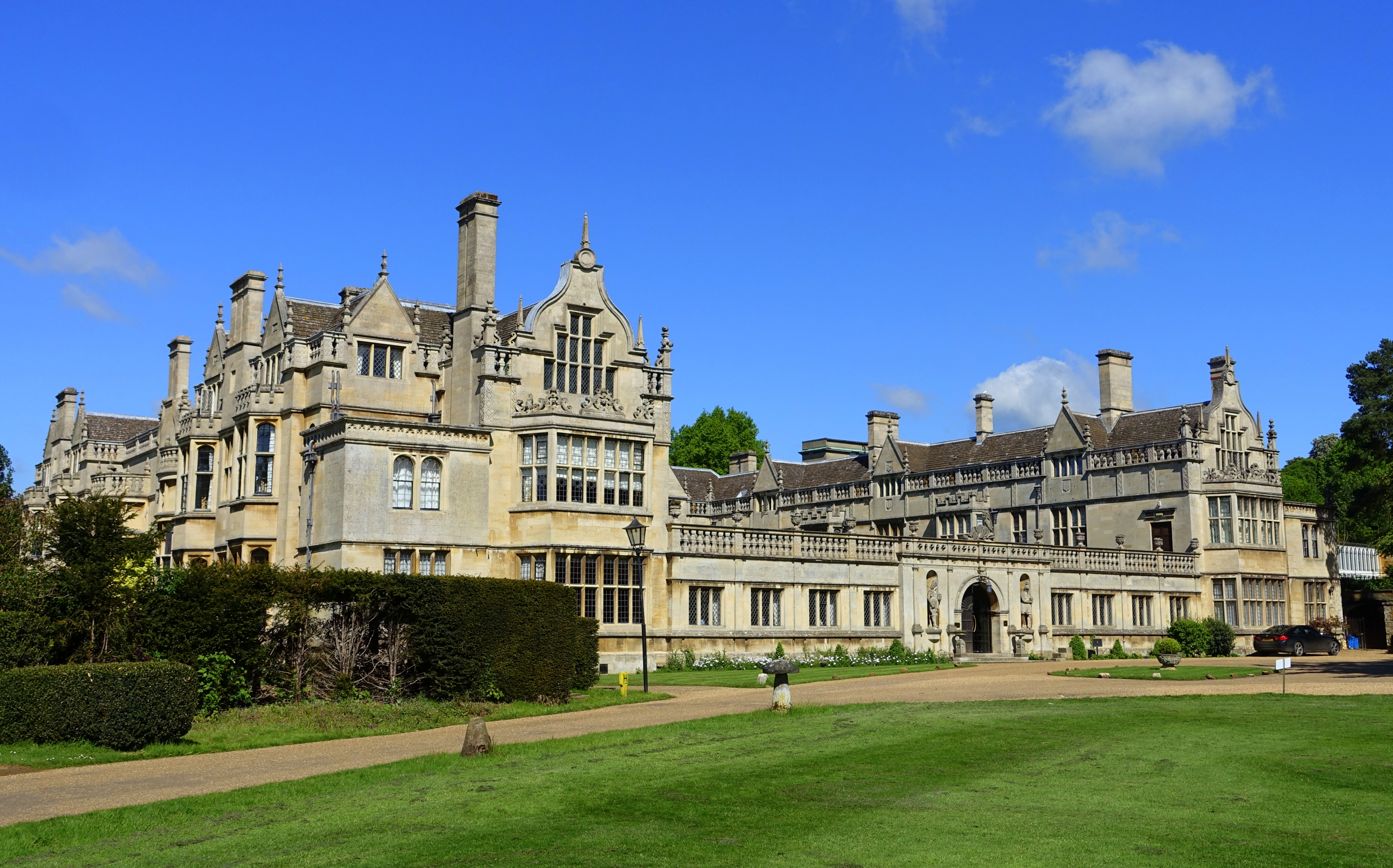

- Location within Northamptonshire
- 52.4366°N 0.7713°W
- Location: Rushton, Northamptonshire

Listed Building – Grade I

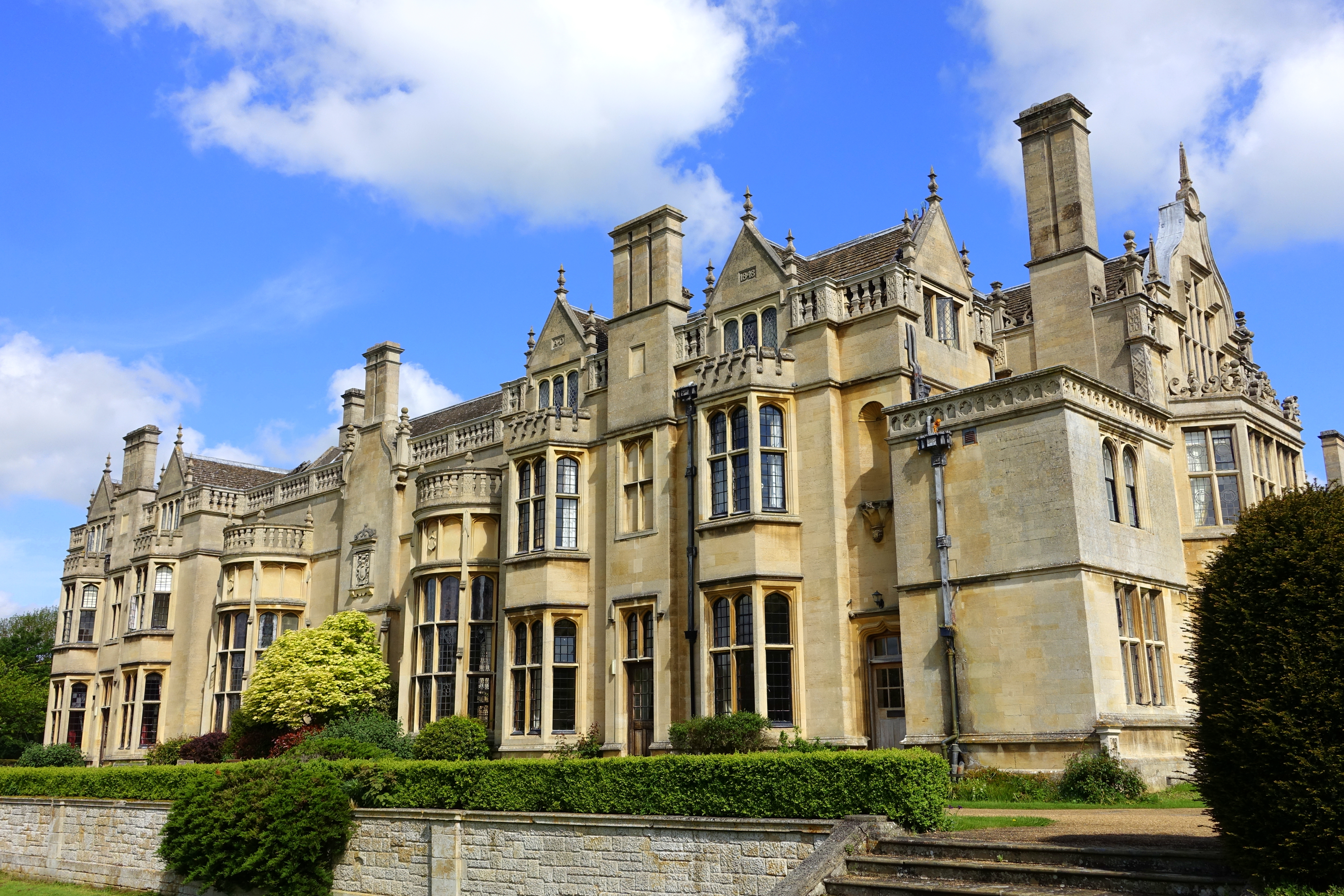
East front of Rushton Hall

Rushton Hall in Rushton, Northamptonshire, England, was the ancestral home of the Tresham family from 1438, when William Tresham, a veteran of the Battle of Agincourt and Chancellor of the Duchy of Lancaster bought the estate. In the 20th century the house became a private school and it has now been converted to a luxury hotel. The estate is about 227 acres (92 ha) of which 30 acres (12 ha) are formal gardens. The River Ise flows from west to east south of the Hall.

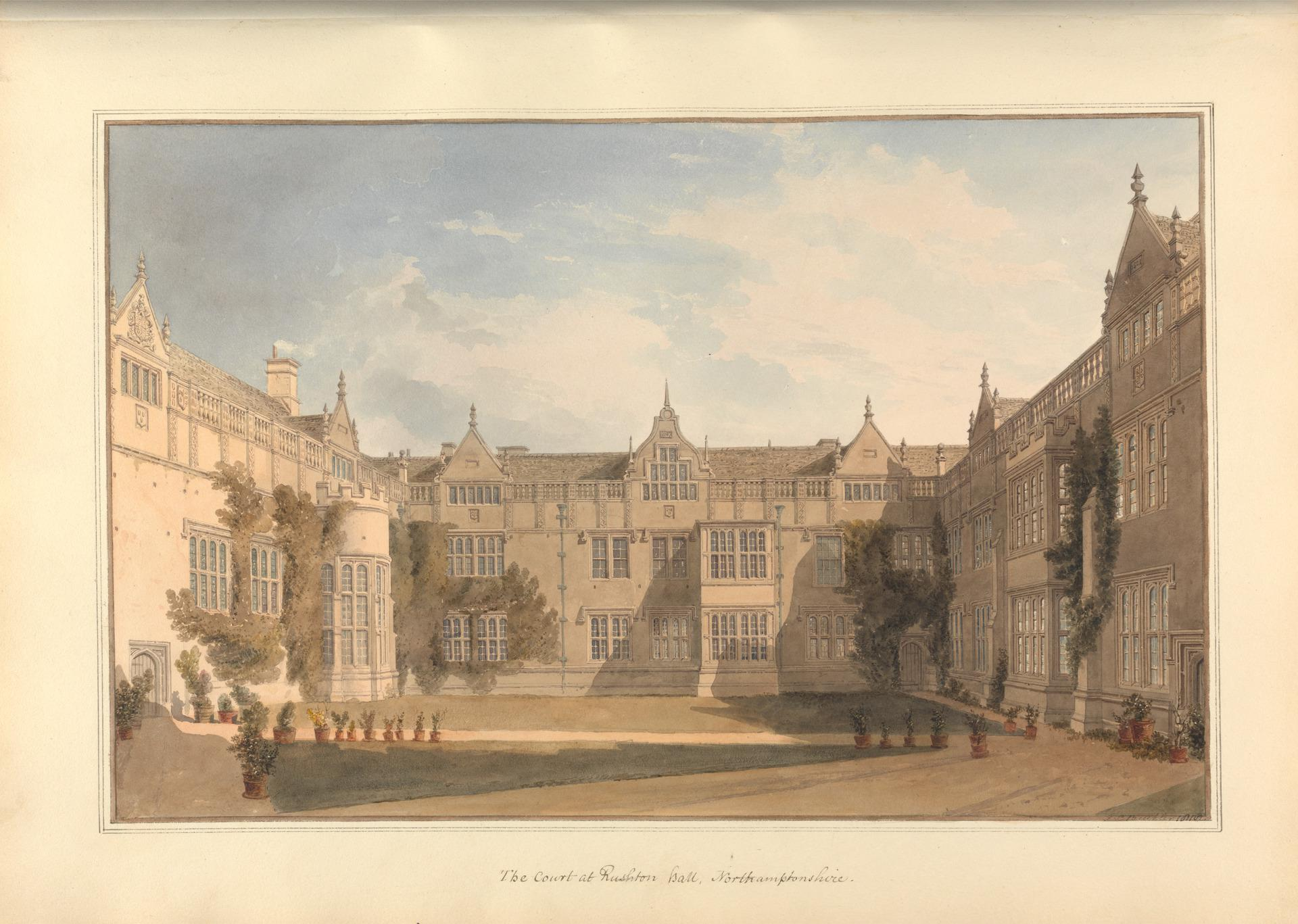
The Court at Rushton hall, Northamptonshire - Yale Center for British Art

== History ==
Rushton Hall had been the possession of the Catholic Tresham family since the fifteenth century, when William Tresham bought the estate in 1438. He was Attorney General to King Henry V, Chancellor of the Duchy of Lancaster and Speaker of the House of Commons and was murdered in 1450. His son Thomas Tresham, High Sheriff of Cambridgeshire and Huntingdonshire, and later Speaker of the House of Commons, was involved in the plots of John de Vere, 13th Earl of Oxford, principal commander of Henry VII of England's army at the Battle of Bosworth Field of the Wars of the Roses.

Sir Thomas Tresham (1500–59), another member of the family of Rushton hall, was Member of Parliament for Northamptonshire, and was married to Mary Parr, daughter of William Parr, 1st Baron Parr of Horton, and cousin of Catherine Parr, Queen of England and of Ireland, last wife of King Henry VIII from the House of Tudor. The latter's grandson Thomas (1534-1605), also a High Sheriff of Northamptonshire in 1573, built the Triangular Lodge in the grounds of the hall in 1592.

He was brother-in-law through his wife, Muriel Throckmorton, daughter of Robert Throckmorton, Constable of Warwick Castle, to Edward Arden, a second cousin of Mary Shakespeare, the mother of William Shakespeare. The Throckmortons were known for their participation in the Rebellion of Thomas Wyatt of 1554 and later on, in the Throckmorton Plot of 1583. Their son, Francis Tresham, was cousin-in-law of the famous Sir Walter Raleigh through his cousin Elizabeth Throckmorton and was involved in the Gunpowder Plot, November the 5th, as being one of the main conspirators and died in the Tower of London in 1605. The estate then passed to his brother Lewis.

The Hall was sold in 1619 to Sir William Cockayne, Lord Mayor of London who was the first Governor of Londonderry, Ireland. and on his death in 1626 passed to his eldest son Charles, later Viscount Cullen, who was appointed High Sheriff of Northamptonshire for 1636–37. His widow remarried to Henry Carey, 1st Earl of Dover, a great-great-grandson of Thomas Boleyn, 1st Earl of Wiltshire, father of Queen Anne Boleyn. The 2nd Viscount, Bryen, married Elizabeth Trentham, the great-grandniece of Elizabeth Trentham, Countess of Oxford who was the wife of Edward de Vere, 17th Earl of Oxford, and through her was the heiress to the Trentham estates including both Rocester Abbey and Hedingham Castle. Hedingham Castle was the ancestral seat of the House of de Vere since it was awarded to their family by William the Conqueror and those estates would later have to be sold to fund the couple's extravagant lifestyle.

In 1828 the Hall was sold to William Hope (banquier), the family of Thomas Hope (1769–1831), owners of the Hope & Co. Bank and the famous Hope Diamond which is valued at 250 million dollars in present times. The Hopes were a famous Dutch banking Dynasty, rivals of the Rothschild family, who were among the richest families in Europe at the time by being the main financiers of the Russian Empress Catherine the Great and the Dutch East India Company (VOC). Amsterdam became an international trading center of diamonds because of their dealings with the King of Portugal, being paid in diamonds for their loans.

After his death in 1854 the estate was sold to Clara Thornhill (later Clarke-Thornhill). Charles Dickens was a great friend of Clara and visited Rushton several times. The fictitious Haversham Hall in Great Expectations was conceived from the Hall. In 1925, Louis(Ludwig) Breitmeyer, a founding director of the De Beers Diamond company leased Rushton Hall. The Clarke-Thornhills owned the hall until 1934. After the death of William Clarke-Thornhill, the Hall was let to an array of tenants including American socialite James J. Van Alen, married to Emily Astor, daughter of William Backhouse Astor Jr. and sister-in-law of James Roosevelt Roosevelt, older brother of the 32nd President of the United States, Franklin D. Roosevelt. Sadly, his brother-in-law John Jacob Astor IV died in the Titanic, and was its wealthiest passenger. Their son married Margaret Van Alen Bruguiére, a niece of Frederick William Vanderbilt. It was James Van Alen who reinstated much Tudor and Jacobean architectural detail.

It became a Grade I listed building in 1951.

In 1957 it became a school for blind children run by the Royal National Institute of Blind People and was opened by Princess Margaret, Countess of Snowdon, sister of Queen Elizabeth II; the school moved to Coventry in 2002.

The Hazelton family bought the hall in August 2003, and restored it to open as a 4 star hotel and spa. It was formally opened by Prince Richard, Duke of Gloucester in 2006.

== Estate ==
The estate has early 20th century formal terraced gardens designed by Thomas Mawson between 1905 and 1909. The rest of the estate has separate ownership to the hotel with features dating back to the 16th century and before. The 16th-century Triangular Lodge in the former parkland is owned by English Heritage and is open to the public.
