= Thomas Tresham =

Thomas Tresham may refer to:

- Sir Thomas Tresham (speaker), beheaded 1471
- Sir Thomas Tresham (died 1559), Catholic politician (under the reign of Mary I of England)
- Sir Thomas Tresham (died 1605), grandson of Thomas Tresham (died 1559)
