= High Sheriff of Northamptonshire =

List of officeholders

This is a list of the High Sheriffs of Northamptonshire.

The High Sheriff is the oldest secular office under the Crown. Formerly the High Sheriff was the principal law enforcement officer in the county but over the centuries most of the responsibilities associated with the post have been transferred elsewhere or are now defunct, so that its functions are now largely ceremonial. The High Sheriff changes every March.

== Before the 13th century ==
- c. 1070 – c. 1090 William of Keynes (or Cahaignes)
- c. 1086 Hugh fitzBaldric
- c. 1125 – 1128: Hugh de Warelville
- 1129: Richard Basset and Aubrey de Vere II
- 1154: Richard Basset and Aubrey de Vere II
- 1155–1156: Simon Fitz Peter
- 1161–1162: Hugh Gobion
- 1163: Simon Fitz Peter and Hugh Gobion
- 1164–1168: Simon Fitz Peter
- 1169–1173: Robert, son of Gawini
- 1174–1176: Hugo de Gundevill
- 1177–1182: Thomas, son of Bernard
- 1183: Thomas and Radulph Morin
- 1184–1186: Geoffrey Fitz Peter
- 1189: Geoffrey Fitz Peter
- 1190–1191: Richard Engaigne
- 1192–1193: Geoffrey Fitz Peter and Robert, son of Radulph
- 1194: Godfrey and Simon of Pattishall
- 1195–1203: Simon of Pattishall

== 13th century ==
- 1204–1205: Robert de Sancei and Henry, son of Peter
- 1206: Peter of Stores and Gilbert Groc
- 1207: Walter of Preston and John de Ulcot (as Custos)
- 1208: Walter of Preston (as Custos)
- 1209–1210: Robert of Braybrooke (as Custos)
- 1211:Robert of Braybrooke and son Henry of Braybrooke (as Custos)
- 1212–1214: Henry of Braybrooke (as Custos)
- 1216–1223: Falkes de Breauté
- 1224–1227: Ralph de Trublevill and Radulph Washingbury
- 1229–1234: Stephen de Segne and William de Marawast
- 1236 (briefly) Peter de Maulay
- 1235–1239: Henry of Bath
- 1240–1241: William de Coleworth
- 1242–1247: Alan de Maidwell
- 1248–1249: Simon de Thorpe
- 1250–1251: Robert Basset
- 1252: William de Lisle
- 1253–1254: Hugh de Manneby
- 1255: William de Lisle
- 1256–1257: Hugh de Manneby
- 1258: Eustace de Watford
- 1259–1261: Simon de Pattishall
- 1262: Alan de Tash (Alan la Zouche)
- 1263–1265: Alan de Insh (Alan la Zouch?)
- 1266: Warin de Basingburn and John de Oxenden
- 1267–1269: John de Moyn and Nicholas de Maunden
- 1270–1272: William de Boyvill
- 1272–1274: Roger of Seaton
- 1274–1277: Sir Gilbert de Kirkby
- 1278: Thomas de Arden
- 1279–1288: Robert de Baud of Loddington
- 1289–1300: John Druell

== 14th century ==
- 1301: Robert de Veer
- 1302–1306: John de Ashton
- 1308: Almeric de Nodardus and Simon de Greenhull
- 1309–1311: John de Willoughby
- 1312: Gal. de Bradden
- 1313: Thomas Wale
- 1314: Eustace de Barnby
- 1315: John de Ashton
- 1316: John de Hoby
- 1317: John de Honby
- 1318: John and Egid. de Cugelio
- 1319: John and Egid. de Cugelio
- 1320: Humphrey de Bassingburn and John Sto Mauro
- 1321: Humphrey Bassingburn
- 1322:
- 1323: John de Sto Mauro (Seymour) and Jahn Daundelin
- 1324: John and John
- 1325: John Daundelin
- 1327: William de Sto Mauro and Simon de Lanshall
- 1328: William de Sto Mauro
- 1329–1330: Thomas Wake I of Blisworth
- 1331–1332: Sir Thomas Greene, 5th Lord of Boketon
- 1333–1336: William Lovell
- 1337–1341: Thomas Wake I of Blisworth
- 1342: Thomas de Babenham
- 1343: Sir Thomas Greene, 5th Lord of Boketon
- 1344–1346: Robert Pandeley
- 1347–1348: Walter Parles
- 1349–1350: Richard Blundell
- 1351: Sir Peter Mallore of Weedon Pinckeney and Litchborough
- 1352–1354: Walter Parles
- 1355–1358: John de Kaynes
- 1359: Andrew Landwath
- 1360: Walter Parles
- 1361–1368: Richard Wydevill
- 1369–1370: Thomas de Preston
- 1371: Richard Wydenell
- 1372: Rober Hotot
- 1373: Simon Ward
- 1374: John Karnell
- 1375: Thomas de Preston
- 1376: Robert Potelyn
- 1377: John Karnell
- 1377: Thomas de Preston
- 1378: John Lions
- 1379: John Paveley
- 1380: John Wydeville of Grafton Regis
- 1381: John Lions
- 1382: Robert atte Chaumbre of Spratton
- 1383: Nicholas Litlinges
- 1384: Roger Chaumbre of Spratton
- 1385: John Wydeville of Grafton Regis
- 1386: John Paveley
- 1387: Roger de la Chaumbre of Spratton
- 1388: Ralph Parles of Watford and Byfield
- 1389: John Paveley
- 1390: John Wydeville of Grafton Regis
- 1391: John Tyndale of Deene
- 1392: John Mallore
- 1383: John Mulsho of Newton by Goldington
- 1394: John Harrowden of Great Harrowden
- 1395: John Mulsho of Newton by Goldington
- 1396: John Warwick of Great Houghton
- 1397–1398: John Mulsho of Newton by Goldington
- 1399: John Warwick of Great Houghton
- 1400: John Cope of Deanshanger and John Chetwood of Warkworth

== 15th century ==
- 1401: Sir Giles Mallory of Weedon Pinkeney and Litchborough
- 1402–1403: Warin Lucien
- 1404: Ralph Green of Drayton
- 1405: Richard Wedenhall
- 1406: Thomas Widevill
- 1407: Ralph Green of Greens Norton
- 1408: Ralph Parles of Watford and Byfield
- 1409: Thomas Mulsho of Newton by Geddington and Pilton
- 1410: Thomas Widevill
- 1411: Mathew Swetenham
- 1412: Ralph Parles of Watford and Byfield
- 1413: Thomas Wake of Blisworth
- 1414: Ralph Green of Drayton
- 1415: Thomas Widevill
- 1416: Ralph Green of Drayton
- 1417: John Manutell
- 1418: Thomas Wake of Blisworth
- 1419: Thomas Pilkington
- 1420–1421: Thomas Wodevill
- 1422: Thomas Wodevill
- 1423: Thomas Holland
- 1424: John Wakerley
- 1425: John Catesby of Althorp
- 1426: Thomas Chaumbre
- 1427: John Knyvet of Southwick
- 1428: Thomas Widevill of Grafton
- 1429: George Longville of Little Billing
- 1430: William Braunspatch
- 1431: John Culpepper of Isham and Exton, Rutland
- 1432: Thomas Chaumbre
- 1433: Thomas Wodevill
- 1434: Thomas Wake of Blisworth
- 1435: John Holland
- 1436: William Vaux of Harrowden
- 1437: Richard Widevill
- 1438: Thomas Chaumbre
- 1439: Eustace Burnby
- 1440: Thomas Holland
- 1441: Sir Thomas Green of Green's Norton
- 1442: William Catesby of Ashby St Ledgers (1st term)
- 1443: John Marbury
- 1444: Henry Green of Drayton
- 1445: Walter Mauntell
- 1446: Thomas Wake of Blisworth
- 1447: John Holland
- 1448: Eustace Burnby
- 1449: William Vaux
- 1450: Thomas Wake of Blisworth
- 1451: William Catesby of Ashby St Ledgers (2nd term)
- 1452: Nicholas Griffin of Dingly
- 1453: William Vaux
- 1454: Thomas Green
- 1455: William Catesby of Ashby St Ledgers (3rd term)
- 1456: Nicholas Griffin
- 1457: Thomas Green
- 1458: Robert Olney
- 1459: William Mauntell
- 1461: William Fairfax
- 1462–1463: Thomas Wake
- 1463: Walter Mountell
- 1464: Henry Green of Drayton
- 1465: Heny Hudleston
- 1466: Ralph Hastings
- 1467: Roger Salisbury
- 1468: Guy Walston
- 1469: William Newenham
- 1470: Sir William Catesby of Ashby St Ledgers (3rd term), replaced by Radulph Hastings after restoration of Edward IV
- 1471: John Hulcot
- 1472: Henry Hudleston
- 1473: Richard Griffin
- 1474: Richard Knightley of Fawsley
- 1475: Thomas Wake/William Bassett
- 1477: William Chaumbre
- 1478: William Catesby of Ashby St Ledgers (4th term)
- 1479: William Newenham
- 1480: Robert Pemberton of Rushden Hall
- 1481: Thomas Lovett I
- 1482: Robert Wittelbury
- 1483: Roger Wake
- 1484: Richard Burton
- 1485: Henry Veer of Addington
- 1486: Richard Knightley
- 1487: Guy Wolston
- 1488: David Phillips
- 1489: Thomas Haliswood
- 1490: Thomas Lovett II (son of Thomas HS 1481)
- 1491: Guy Walston
- 1492: Robert Wittelbury
- 1493: John Danvers
- 1494: John Dyve
- 1495: Nicholas Vaux
- 1496: William Hertwell
- 1497: William Salisbury
- 1498: Humphrey Catesby
- 1499: Richard Burton
- 1500: Fulk Wodehall

== 16th century ==
- 1501: Nicholas Vaux
- 1502: Thomas Andrews of Harlston
- 1503: John Dyve
- 1504: Sir Nicholas Griffin
- 1505: Thomas Lovett III
- 1506: John Trssham
- 1507: Thomas Cheyne
- 1508: John Mulshow
- 1509: Sir Thomas Parr
- 1510: Richard Knightley
- 1511: John Spew
- 1512: Radulph Lane
- 1513: John Catesby
- 1514: Robert Mathew
- 1515: Nicholas Woodhull
- 1516: Nicholas Vaux
- 1517: William Parr
- 1518: William Gascoigne (died 1540)
- 1519: Thomas Lucy
- 1520: John Mulshow
- 1521: William Parr
- 1522; John Clarke
- 1523: William Fitz-William snr
- 1524: Sir Thomas Tresham of Rushton Hall
- 1525: Walter Mauntell
- 1526: Humphrey Stafford
- 1527: Nicholas Odell
- 1528: William Fitz-William
- 1529: John Clarke
- 1530: Richard Cave
- 1531: William Spencer (died in office and succeeded by David Cecil
- 1532: David Cecil
- 1533: William Parr
- 1534: Sir Thomas Griffin
- 1535: John Clark
- 1536: William Newenham of Everdon
- 1537: William Parr
- 1538: Anthony Catesby
- 1539: Sir Thomas Tresham
- 1540: William Newenham of Everdon
- 1541: Robert Kyrkman
- 1542: Richard Catesby of Ashby St Ledgers
- 1543: Thomas Brudenell
- 1544: Sir Thomas Griffin
- 1545: John Cope
- 1546: Thomas Cave
- 1547: Humphrey Stafford
- 1548: Sir Thomas Tresham
- 1549: Richard Catesby of Ashby St Ledgers
- 1550: Thomas Andrews
- 1551: Sir John Spencer of Althorp
- 1552: Thomas Lovell
- 1553: Sir Thomas Cave
- 1554: Sir Valentine Knightley
- 1555: Sir Thomas Tresham of Rushton Hall
- 1556: Sir Thomas Andrewes
- 1557: Sir John Fermer of Easton Neston
- 1558: Sir John Spencer of Althorp
- 1559: Edward Montagu of Boughton
- 1560: Thomas Lovell
- 1561: Thomas Spencer
- 1562: Thomas Catesby of Ashby St Legers
- 1563: Robert Lane of Horton Hall
- 1564: Edmund Brudenel of Dean
- 1565: Humphrey Stafford of Blatherwick
- 1566: Edward Elmes of Lilford
- 1567: Sir Richard Knightley
- 1568: Thomas Andrews of Cherwello
- 1569: William Sanders
- 1570: Sir Edward Montagu of Boughton
- 1571: Sir John Spencer of Althorp
- 1572: Thomas Lovell
- 1573: Thomas Tresham II of Rushton Hall
- 1574: Edmund Onley
- 1575: Roger Cave of Stanford
- 1576: Thomas Brooke of Great Oakley
- 1577: Edmund Brudenell
- 1578: Thomas Cecil, 1st Earl of Exeter of Burghley
- 1578: John Spencer of Althorp
- 1579: William Chauncy of Edgecot
- 1580: Anthony Mildmay
- 1581: Sir Richard Knightley
- 1581: John Isham of Longport
- 1582: Edward Griffin of Dingley
- 1583: Sir John Spencer of Althorp
- 1584: Sir Euseby Isham
- 1585: Bartholemew Tate of Delapré Abbey
- 1586: Sir Thomas Andrews
- 1587: Edward Saunders
- 1588: Sir Edward Montagu of Boughton
- 1589: George Fermor of Easton
- 1590: John Spencer of Althorp
- 1591: Edward Watson of Rockingham
- 1592: Anthony Mildmay of Apethorpe
- 1593: Thomas Chauncy
- 1594: John Read
- 1595: Sir Edward Montagu of Boughton, Weekley
- 1596: Thomas Molsho
- 1597: Richard Chetwood
- 1598: Sir Erasmus Dryden, 1st Baronet of Canons Ashby House
- 1599: William Browne
- 1600: Sir Edward Montagu of Boughton

== 17th century ==
- 1601: Robert Spencer of Wormleighton, Warks and Althorp.
- 1602: George Shirley of Astwell
- 1603: William Tate of Delapré Abbey
- 1604: Sir Arthur Throckmorton
- 1605: John Freeman of Great Billing
- 1606: William Samuel
- 1607: William Fitz-William of Milton
- 1608: Thomas Elmes of Greenes Norton
- 1609: William Saunders
- 1610: Thomas Tresham of Newton
- 1611: John Isham
- 1612: Eusebius Andrews
- 1613: John Wiseman
- 1614: William Willmer of Sywell
- 1615: God. Chibnall of Orlebere
- 1616: Thomas Brooke
- 1617: Hatton Farmer
- 1618: Simon Norwich of Branton
- 1619: Sir Erasmus Dryden of Canons Ashby House
- 1620: Sir Lewis Pemberton
- 1621: John Hanbury of Kelmarsh
- 1622: Moses Troyoll
- 1623: Edward Shuckburgh of Navesby
- 1624: William Chauncey
- 1626: Richard Knightley of Fawsley Hall
- 1627: John Davers
- 1628: John Worley of Dodford
- 1629: Henry Robinson of Cransley
- 1630: Thomas Elmes
- 1631: Francis Nicholls of Faxton
- 1632: John Hewett of Hemington
- 1633: Lewis Watson of Rockingham Castle
- 1634: Richard Samwell
- 1635: Sir John Dryden, 2nd Baronet
- 1636: Charles Cokayne of Rushton Hall
- 1637: Robert Banaster
- 1638: John Handbury
- 1639: Philip Holman
- 1640: Christopher Yelverton of Easton Maudit
- 1641: Anthony Haslewood
- 1642: Sir Richard Willmore
- 1643: Edward Harby
- 1644: John Norton of Cotterstock
- 1645: Sir John Norwich, 1st Baronet
- 1646: William Ward of Houghton
- 1647: Richard Andrew of Thorpe
- 1648: Sir Samuel D'Anvers, 1st Baronet
- 1649: John Norton of Cotterstock
- 1650: Charles Edmonds
- 1651: Edward Hanburye
- 1652: Samuel Jones of Courteenhall
- 1653: Moses Tryan of Harringworth replaced by Peter Tryon
- 1654: Robert Andrewes
- 1655: Henry Robinson
- 1656: John Mansell
- 1657: Sir Edward Nicolls, 2nd Baronet
- 1658: Henry Benson
- 1660: Sir William Dudley, 1st Baronet of Clopton
- 1661: William Adams
- 1662: Sir George Buswell, 1st Baronet
- 1663: Edward Onley
- 1664: Sir James Langham of Cottesbrooke Hall
- 12 November 1665: Joseph Hanbury
- 7 November 1666: Sir Robert Dryden, 3rd Baronet
- 6 November 1667: Tobias Chauncey
- 6 November 1668: Robert Andrewes
- 11 November 1669: Thomas Elmes
- 4 November 1670: William Langham, of Walgrave and Cottesbrooke Hall
- 10 November 1670: William Tate
- 16 November 1670: Henry Stafford
- 9 November 1671: William Langham, of Walgrave and Cottesbrooke Hall
- 11 November 1672: John Thorneton
- 12 November 1673: Basil Brent
- 5 November 1674: William Adams
- 12 November 1674: John Bridges
- 1674: Walter Kirkham
- 15 November 1675: Edward Harby, of Adstone
- 10 November 1676: John Norton, of Cotterstock
- 15 November 1677: Charles Neale, of Weston
- 14 November 1678: Richard Saltonstall
- 13 November 1679: Sir Roger Cave, 2nd Baronet, of Stanford Hall, Leicestershire
- 4 November 1680: Thomas Ward
- 1681: Harvey Ekins
- 1682: John Briscoe
- 1683: Sir Matthew Dudley, 2nd Baronet
- 1684: Henry Benson
- 1685: Charles Kirkham
- 1686: Edward Saunders
- 1687: Thomas Andrewes of Great Addington and Harleston
- 1688: William Hastings of Hinton
- 1689: Thomas Andrewes of Great Addington and Harleston
- 1690: John Creed
- 1691: Sir Richard Craven
- 1692: Francis Arundell of Stoke Park, Stoke Bruern
- 1693: Thomas Cartwright of Aynhoe Park
- 1694: Richard Lockwood of Gayton
- 1695: William Ward of Houghton
- 1695: John Lynn
- 1696: William Cuthbert
- 1697: Lucy Knightley
- 1698: Thomas Thornton
- 1698: Thomas Langham
- 1699: Elmes Steward
- 1700: William Ward

== 18th century ==
- 1701: Sir Caesar Child, 2nd Baronet
- 1702: Randolph Wickes
- 1703: Sir John Langham, 4th Baronet
- 1704: Erasmus Norwich, bart
- 1705: Edward Stratford replaced by Henry Stratford
- 1706: Sir Richard Newman, Bt. of Evercreech, Somerset and Fifehead Magdalen, Dorset
- 1707: Elmes Spinckes.
- 1708: Joseph Ashley
- 1709: John Freman
- 1710: Lucy Knightley the younger
- 1711: Richard Freeman
- 1712: John Wiseman replaced by John Robinson
- 1713: Thomas Allen of Chelston
- 1714: Sir Francis St John, 1st Baronet of Longthorpe
- 1715: Thomas Maidwell
- 1716: Thomas Ekins of Twywell
- 1717: William Ash
- 1718: Thomas Deacon
- 1719: John Beauchamp
- 1720: Giles Knightley
- 1721: John Humble, 4th Baronet
- 1722: Edward Hutchinson
- 1724: William Thursby
- 1725: James Joy
- 1726: Sir Arthur Hesilrige, 7th Baronet
- 1727: Charles Parker of Burghberry Manor, Peterborough replaced by Sir John Dryden, 7th Baronet
- 1728: Thomas Shepard
- 1729: John Ward of Guilsborough
- 1730: John Rose of Cotterstock
- 1731: William Loveday
- 1732: Thomas Cooke
- 1733: Christopher Rigby
- 1734: Thomas Langton
- 1735: Charles Wake Jones
- 1736: Sir John Robinson of Cranford, 4th Bt.
- 1737: Charles Tryon
- 1738: Charles Edwin of Llanmihangel Plas, Monmouthshire
- 1739: Sir Thomas Palmer, 4th Baronet, of Carlton
- 1740: Henry Sayer
- 1741: Thomas Powys
- 1742: Valentine Knightley of Fawsley Hall
- 1743: George de Vall
- 1744: John Hicholls Rainsford of Bricksworth
- 1745: Sir Samwell Newman, Bt
- 1746: Edward Price of Milton
- 1747: Sir Thomas Drury, 1st Baronet of Overstone
- 1748: Richard Woodford of Northampton
- 1750: Harvey Sparkes of Irchester
- 1751: Ambrose Dickens of Woolaston
- 1752: Sir Charles Wake-Jones, 6th Baronet
- 1753: Armstead Parker of Peterborough
- 1754: John Robinson of Cransley
- 1755: Henry White of Woodend
- 1756: John Ashley of Ledgers Ashby
- 1757: John Creed of Oundle
- 1758: Joseph Clarke, of Welton
- 1759: William Payne King of Fineshade Priory
- 1760: Sir William Dolben, 3rd Baronet of Finedon
- 1761: Sir Thomas Ward of Guilsborough
- 1762: Donatus O'Brien of Blatherwick replaced by Jeffery Fisher of Irchester
- 1763: Sir Michael D'Anvers, 5th Baronet
- 1764: Booth Williams, 3rd Baronet
- 1765: John Harper of Burton Latimer
- 1766: Sir George Robinson, 5th Baronet of Cranford
- 1767: Sir James Langham, 7th Baronet, of Copgrave
- 1768: Thomas Powys of Lilford
- 1769: Thomas Langton of Teeton
- 1770: Lucy Knightley of Fawsley Hall
- 1771: Sir William Wake of Courteenhall
- 1772: Francis Beynon of Spratton
- 1773: William Hanbury of Kelmarsh
- 1774: Leonard Burton of Denford
- 1775: John Clarke of Bulwick
- 1776: Justinian Isham of Lamport, Bt.
- 1777: Robert Andrew of Harleston
- 1778: John Plomer Clark of Welton
- 1779: Roger Parker of Peterborough
- 1780: Benjamin Kidney of Knuston
- 1781: Nicolls Raynsford of Brixworth
- 1782: Henry Sawbridge of Daventry
- 1783: Michael Wodhull of Shewford
- 1784: Richard Kirby of Flore
- 1785: Lucas Ward of Guilsborough
- 1786: Isaac Pocock of Biggin
- 1787: William Walcot, the younger, of Oundle
- 1788: Joseph Ashley of Ledgers Ashby
- 1789: Richard Hanwell, of Long Buckby
- 1790: John Freke Willes of Aistrop
- 1791: William Wake of Courteenhall
- 1792: Samuel Rudge of Tansor
- 1793: Sir John Dryden, later Sir John Dryden, 1st Baronet
- 1794: Richard Booth of Glendon
- 1795: Valentine Knightley of Fawsley Hall
- 1796: Allen Edward Young, the younger, of Orlingbury
- 1797: Sir William Langham, 8th Baronet of Cottesbrooke Hall
- 1798: Thomas Reeve Thornton of Brock Hall
- 1799: Martin Lucas of Northampton
- 5 February 1800: Edward Bouverie, the younger, of Delapré

== 19th century ==
- 11 February 1801: Joseph Sibley, of Northampton
- 3 February 1802: Robert Cary Elwes, of Great Billing
- 3 February 1803: John Harvey Thursby, of Abington Abbey
- 1 February 1804: Charles Tibbits, of Barton Seagrave
- 6 February 1805: John Capel Rose, of Cransley
- 1 February 1806: Thomas Carter of Edgcote House
- 4 February 1807: Thomas Tryon, of Bulwick
- 3 February 1808: George Fleet Evans, of Laxton
- 6 February 1809: Robert Andrew, of Harleston
- 31 January 1810: William Sawbridge, of East Haddon
- 8 February 1811: Walter Strickland, of Brixworth Hall
- 24 January 1812: Peter Denys, of Easton Neston
- 10 February 1813: George Rush, of Farthinghoe
- 4 February 1814: John Plomer Clarke, of Welton
- 13 February 1815: Levison Vernon, of Stoke Bruerne
- 1816: Sir James Langham, 10th Baronet of Cottesbrooke Hall
- 1817: Sir Charles Knightley, 2nd Baronet of Fawsley Hall
- 1818: John Booth of Glendon
- 1819: John Henry Palmer, 7th Baronet of Carlton Curlieu
- 1820: John Cooke of Hoothorpe
- 1821: Thomas Philip Maunsell of Thorpe Malsor
- 1822: John Nethercoat of Haselbeach
- 1823: Thomas W Hunt of Wadenhoe
- 1824: William Abbot
- 1825: Sir Robert Gunning, 3rd Baronet of Horton Hall appointed but declined to serve – replaced by Thomas Williams of Rushden Hall
- 1826: George Payne of Sulby
- 1827: John Jackson Blencowe
- 1828 Henry Hungerford Holditch Hungerford of Maidwell
- 1829: Samuel-Amy Severne of Thenford
- 1830: Richard Pack of Flore
- 1831: Beriah Botfield of Norton Hall
- 1832: William Williams Hope of Rushton Hall
- 1833: William Rose Rose, of Harleston
- 1834: William Wood, of Brixworth
- 1835: Lewis Loyd, of Overstone Park
- 1836: William Harris, of Wootton House
- 1837: William Willes, of Astrop House
- 1838: John Reddall, of Dallington Hall
- 1839: William Drayson, of Flore Fields House
- 1840: Thomas Alderson Cooke, of Peterborough
- 1841: Sir Robert Gunning, 3rd Baronet, of Horton
- 1842: Philip Sydney Pierrepont, of Evenley Hall
- 1843: Sir Arthur de Capell Brooke, 2nd Baronet of Oakley
- 1844: Sir Henry Dryden, 7th Baronet, of Ashby
- 1845: Richard Watson, of Rockingham Castle
- 1846: Allen Allicocke Young, of Orlingbury
- 1847: Thomas Tryon, of Bulwick Park
- 1848: Henry Hely-Hutchinson, of Lois Weedon
- 1849: Henry Nevile, of Walcot Hall
- 1850: William Bruce Stopford, of Drayton House
- 1851: Sir Charles Edmund Isham, 10th Baronet of Lamport Hall
- 1852: Langham Christie, of Preston Deanery
- 1853: Cary Charles Elwes, of Great Billing
- 1854: Anthony Henley, 3rd Baron Henley
- 1855: Frederick Urban Sartoris, of Rushden Hall
- 1856: Oscar William Hambro, of Pipwell Hall
- 1857: William Harcourt Isham Mackworth Dolben, of Finedon Hall
- 1858: John Christopher Mansel, of Cosgrove
- 1859: Charles Henry Cust of Arthingworth
- 1860: William Capel Clarke Thornhill of Rushton Hall
- 1861: John Edmund Severne, of Thenford
- 1862: William Smyth, of Little Houghton
- 1863: George Ashby Ashby, of Naseby
- 1864: Alfred Rush, of Farthinghoe
- 1865: Richard Aubrey Cartwright, of Edgecote
- 1866: George Wentworth-FitzWilliam
- 1867: William Somerset Rose, of Cransley
- 1868: Henry De Stafford O'Brien, of Blatherwycke
- 1869: Frederick Child Villiers of Sulby Hall
- 1870: George Lewis Watson of Rockingham Castle
- 1871: Sir Geoffrey Palmer 8th Baronet of East Carlton Hall
- 1872: Henry Osmond Nethercote of Moulton Grange
- 1873: Sir William Richmond Brown, 2nd Bart. of Astrop House, Kings Sutton.
- 1874: John Albert Craven, of Whilton
- 1875: Lieutenant – Colonel Thomas Tryon, of Bulwick Park
- 1876: Thomas William Rhodes, of Flore Fields
- 1877: John Augustus Sheil Bouverie, of Delapre Abbey
- 1878: William Goddard Jackson, the younger, of Duddington,
- 1879: Sir Hereward Wake, 12th Baronet of Courteenhall
- 1880: Henry Vane Forester Holdich Hungerford, of Dingley Park
- 1881: Sir Thomas George Fermor-Hesketh, 7th Baronet of Easton Neston
- 1882: Richard Henry Ainsworth, of Winwick Warren, Rugby
- 1883: Ernest Richard Charles Gust, of Arthingworth
- 1884: Charles William Hamilton Sotheby, of Ecton
- 1885: Joseph Hill, of Wollaston
- 1886: Thomas William Thornton, of Brockhall
- 1887: Howard Henry Howard Vyse, of Boughton Park
- 1888: Edmund Giles Loder, of Flore
- 1889: Paul Edgar Tichborne Hibbert, of Ashby St Ledgers
- 1890: William Cornwallis Cartwright of Aynhoe Park
- 1891: Herbert Robert Arkwright, of Knuston Hall, Wellingborough
- 1892: Bertie Wentworth Vernon, of Stoke Park, Towcester
- 1893: Edward Grant, of Litchborough
- 1894: George Charles Wentworth Fitzwilliam of Milton Park
- 1895: William Henry Barfoot-Saunt, of Great Oxendon
- 1896: Percy Mitchell, of Cranford Hall, Kettering
- 1897: Pickering Phipps, of Rushton Hall, Kettering
- 1898: Major-General Frederick Edward Sotheby, of Ecton
- 1899: Reginald Bernard Loder, of Maidwell Hall
- 1900: Thomas Francis Hazlehurst, of Cold Ashby Hall

== 20th century ==
- 1901: James Griffith Dearden, of Walcot Hall, Southorpe, Stamford
- 1902: James Hornsby, of Laxton Park, Stamford
- 1903: John Cooper, of Delapre Abbey
- 1904: Charles Piggott Harvey, of Guilsborough Hall
- 1905: Nathaniel Charles Rothschild, of Ashton, Oundle
- 1906: George Harold Winterbottom, of Horton Hall, Northampton
- 1907: Henry Brassey, 1st Baron Brassey
- 1908: Walter Bairstow, of The Lodge, Towcester
- 1909: Sir Henry Edward Randall of The Hall, Monks Park, Northampton
- 1910: William Bean of The Firs, Easton, Stamford
- 1911: John Layton Mills, of Tansor Court, Oundle
- 1912: Edmund Henry Bevan, of Whilton Lodge, Rugby
- 1913: William Murland of Badby House, Daventry
- 1914: Stephen Schilizzi, of Guilsborough Court, Northampton
- 1915: James Manfield, of Weston Favell House, Northampton
- 1916: Owen Clark Wallis, of West Haddon Hall, Rugby
- 1917: Gervase Elwes of Billing Hall, Great Billing
- 1918: Joseph Dickinson Lees, of Whittlebury Lodge, Towcester
- 1919: Frank Hawthorn Burn, of Pattisihall House, Towcester
- 1920: Stanley Brotherhood, of Thornhaugh Hall, Wansford
- 1921: Arthur Eustace Seymour Guinness, of Greens Norton Hall, Towcester
- 1922: Thomas Bryan Clarke-Thornhill of Victoria Street, SW1
- 1923: Brigadier-General Algernon Francis Holford Ferguson, of Polebrook Hall, Oundle.
- 1924: Philip Leslie Agnew of Littlecourt, Farthingstone, Weedon
- 1925: John Allen, of Brackley House, Brackley
- 1926: Lieut-Col. Sir Charles Lowther, 4th Baronet of Thornby House, Northampton
- 1927: George Henry Drummond of Pitsford Hall, Northampton
- 1928: Major Cecil John Cokayne Maunsell, of Thorpe Malsor Hall, Kettering
- 1929: Capt. Eric Brand Butler-Henderson, of Winwick Manor, Rugby.
- 1930: Major William Henry Allen, of Evenley Hall, Brackley
- 1931: Lieut-Col. Percy Lester Reid, The Manor House, Thorpe Mandeville, Banbury
- 1932: Sir Thomas Fermor-Hesketh, Bt. of Easton Neston, Towcester
- 1933: William Thomas Sears, of Weston Favell
- 1934: Sir Charles Edward St. John Frederick, of Lamport Grange, Northampton
- 1935: Capt. Arnold Stancomb Wills, of Thornby Hall
- 1936: William Thomas Vere Wayte Wood, of Brixworth Hall
- 1937: George Beale, of Potterspury Lodge
- 1938: Major Colin Cooper, of Barnwell Castle, Peterborough (died 29 March before taking office)
- 1938: Major Geoffrey Reginald Devereux Shaw, of Whilton Lodge
- 1939: Capt. Reginald Macdonald-Buchanan of Cottesbrooke Hall
- 1940: Richard Fairfax William Cartwright of Aynhoe Park, Banbury, Oxon
- 1941: Capt. George Ernest Bellville of Fermyn Woods Hall, Brigstock, Kettering.
- 1942: Sir C. Kenneth Murchison of Hargrave Hall, Wellingborough
- 1943: Lieut.-Col. Herbert George Sotheby of Ecton Hall
- 1944: Major-General Sir Hereward Wake, of Courteenhall
- 1945: Lieut.-Colonel Richard Montague Raynsford of Milton Manor,
- 1946: Lieutenant-Colonel Thomas Anson Thornton, of Brockhall
- 1947: Lieut.-Col. Phillip York Atkinson, of Cosgrove Priory, Stony Stratford, Bletchley.
- 1948: Sacheverell Sitwell, of Weston Hall, Towcester.
- 1949: Major Philip Henry de Lerisson Cazenove, of Cottesbrooke
- 1950: Cecil Vere Davidge of Little Houghton House, Northampton
- 1951: Captain Geoffrey William Martin Lees of Falcutt House, Helmdon, Brackley,
- 1952: Henry Charles Minshull Stockdale of Mears Ashby Hall
- 1953: Edward Raymond Courage of Edgecote, near Banbury.
- 1954: Bertram Francis George Currie of Dingley Hall, near Market Harborough
- 1955: Major Hereward Wake of Courteenhall
- 1956: Lieut.-Colonel Roland Lewis Findlay, of Naseby Woolleys, Rugby
- 1957: Richard Leslie Agnew of Peartree Cottage, Turweston, Brackley
- 1958: Lt-Col. Sir Gyles Isham, 12th Baronet of Lamport Hall, Northampton
- 1959: Edward Spencer, Viscount Althorp, of Althorp
- 1960: Maj-Gen. Evelyn Fanshawe of Guilsborough House
- 1961: Lt-Col. Dennis Douglas Pilkington Smyly of Brackley Grange
- 1962: Lt-Col. George Theodore Herbert Capron of Southwick Hall
- 1963: Capt. John Macdonald-Buchanan of Cottesbrooke Hall
- 1964: Lt-Col. Neil Phipps Foster of Whittlebury Cottage
- 1965: Arnold Derek Arthur Lawson of Passenham Manor
- 1966: Cmdr. Sir Michael Culme-Seymour, 5th Baronet of Rockingham Castle
- 1967: Col. Percy Fergus Ivo Reid, of Whitfield Cottage
- 1968: Richmond Noel Richmond-Watson of Wakefield Lodge
- 1969: Guy Timothy Geoffrey Conant of Bulwick Hall
- 1970: Sir Edward William Spencer Ford of Eydon Hall
- 1971: Capt. John Luke Lowther of The Old House, Guilsborough
- 1972: Alexander James Macdonald-Buchanan of Harrowden Hall
- 1973: Michael Francis Berry of Benefield House
- 1974: Sir Spencer Summers, of Thenford House
- 1975: Timothy Mark Sergison-Brooke of The Manor House, Chipping Warden
- 1976: Lionel Geoffrey Stopford-Sackville of Drayton House
- 1977: John Walter Douglas Ewart of Astrop Park
- 1978: Commander Leslie Michael MacDonald Saunders Watson of Rockingham Castle
- 1979: Lt-Col. Thomas Boardman of the Manor House, Welford
- 1980: Robert Henry Nevile Dashwood of Farminghoe Lodge
- 1981: Christian Fermor-Hesketh, Baroness Hesketh of Pomfret Lodge, Hulcote, Towcester.
- 1982: Hugh Welby Guinness de Capell Brook of Great Oakley Hall
- 1983: Penelope Aubrey-Fletcher, 8th Baroness Braye of Stanford Hall, Leicestershire.
- 1984: William David Morton of Flore Fields, Flore.
- 1985: Cyril Humphrey Cripps of Bulls Head Farm, Eakley Lanes, Stoke Goldington, Newport Pagnell, Buckinghamshire
- 1986: John Henry Otter, Esq., of Elmes House, Pilton, near Oundle, Peterborough.
- 1987: Edmund Crispin Stephen James George Brudenell of Deene Park, Corby
- 1988: Christopher Guy Vere Davidge of Little Houghton House, Northampton.
- 1989: Peter Douglas Smith, of Westbrook, Flax Bourton, Bristol
- 1990: William Richard Frank Chamberlain, of The Manor House, Swineshead, Bedford
- 1991: Lady Juliet Margaret Townsend of Newbottle Manor, Banbury.
- 1992: Richard Paul Seddon, of Northampton Road, Kettering.
- 1993: John George Church
- 1994: Lavinia Anne Perry, of Park Farm House, Astrop, Banbury
- 1995: James Mackaness, of The Old Rectory, Church Brampton.
- 1996: Michael Francis Collcutt, of Isebrook Cottage, Station Road, Finedon, Wellingborough
- 1997: Arthur Robert Heygate, The Mill House, Bugbrooke
- 1998: Lady Morton, Flore Fields, Flore, Northampton
- 1999: David Reynolds, Burdyke, Weekley, Kettering
- 2000: Anthony Geoffrey Stoughton-Harris of Old Farm House, Blackmile Lane, Grendon.

== 21st century ==
- 2001: Lady Robinson, Cranford Hall, Cranford, Kettering
- 2002: Jonathan George Pearson, of Castle Ashby Lodge, Castle Ashby.
- 2003: John Gerald Nicholson of Benefield House, Lower Benefield, Oundle.
- 2004: John Frederick Thorpe of The Manor House, Everdon, Daventry
- 2005: Hereward Charles Wake
- 2006: Sir David O'Dowd
- 2007: Lady Jennifer Harper of Titchmarsh, Kettering
- 2008: Peter Brian Ellwood of Church Stowe
- 2009: Susan Deirdre Fenwick of Towcester
- 2010: David Eric Laing of Brigstock
- 2011: Penelope J Escombe of Brigstock
- 2012: John Richard Townsend of Newbottle Manor, Banbury, Oxfordshire
- 2013: James Michael Shepherd-Cross of Bengal Manor, Greens Norton, Northamptonshire
- 2014: (Virginia) Anne Burnett of Wigsthorpe, Peterborough
- 2015: Dr. Ahmed Ibrahim Mukhtar of Barton Seagrave, Kettering
- 2016: Caroline Cordelia Brocklehurst, Towcester
- 2017: Rupert Patrick Fordham, of Wappenham
- 2018: James Michael Ross Saunders Watson, of Rockingham Castle
- 2019: Nicholas Antony Norman Stuart Robertson, of Thorpe Malsor, Kettering
- 2020: Paul Thomas Serge Parsons, of Towcester
- 2021: Amanda Ursula Georgina Lowther, of Guilsborough
- 2022: Crispin David Jermyn Holborow
- 2023: Milan Naresh Shah
- 2024: Amy Louise Crawfurd, of Towcester
- 2025: Jeremy William Sherman, of Gretton
- 2026: Roger William Butler, Wellingborough
