= Thomas Tresham (died 1559) =

English politician

Sir Thomas Tresham (died 8 March 1559) was a leading Catholic politician during the middle of the Tudor dynasty in England.

== Family ==
Thomas Tresham was the eldest son of John Tresham of Rushton Hall, Northamptonshire, and Elizabeth Harrington, daughter of Sir James Harrington, of Hornby, Lancashire.

== Career ==
Tresham was knighted by 1524. He was chosen Sheriff in 1524, 1539, 1548 and 1555/6, and returned as a Member of Parliament for Northamptonshire in 1541 and twice in 1554. In 1530 he served on a Royal Commission inquiring into Cardinal Wolsey's possessions. In 1537 he served on another to inquire into the Lincolnshire rebellion.

In 1539 he was one of those appointed to receive Henry VIII's future fourth wife, Anne of Cleves, at Calais. In 1540, he had licence to impark the Lyveden estate in the Aldwinkle St Peter's parish, where the "New Bield" erected by his grandson Thomas Tresham II still stands.

In the same year, although his main estates were in Northamptonshire, it was noted that he had a house with twenty-nine household servants at Wolfeton in Charminster, Dorset.

In 1544 he supplied men for the king's army in France, and a little later was one of the commissioners to collect the "benevolence" for the defense of the realm. In 1546 he was appointed assessor to the "Contribution Commission", and was summoned to Court to meet the French ambassador. In 1549 he assisted in suppressing Kett's Rebellion, and received £272, 19.6 for his services.

On 18 July 1553, he proclaimed Queen Mary I at Northampton, and accompanied her on her entry into London. He was one of those appointed on 3 August 1553, "to staye the assemblies in Royston and other places of Cambridgeshire". That year he was also MP for Lancaster.

He was named Grand Prior of England in the Order of Knights Hospitallers of St John of Jerusalem by Royal Charter dated 2 April 1557, qualifying him for a seat in the House of Lords. It was not till 30 November that the order was re-established in England with four knights under him, and he was solemnly invested. In the meantime, Sir Richard Shelley had been made turcopolier at Malta. The order was endowed by the queen with lands to the yearly value of £1436. He took his seat in the House of Lords in January, 1557–58, but sent a proxy to the first parliament of Queen Elizabeth I, possibly due to illness. He died in 1559. He was buried at All Saints Church, Rushton, Northamptonshire with great pomp on 16 March 1559.

== Marriages and issue ==
He married firstly Mary Parr, youngest daughter and co-heir of William Parr, 1st Baron Parr of Horton, by whom he had three sons:

- John Tresham, who died in the lifetime of his father. His son, also named Sir Thomas Tresham, succeeded his grandfather.
- William Tresham.

He married, secondly, Lettice Peniston, widow, successively, of Sir Robert Knollys and Sir Robert Lee (d. 1539), and daughter of Sir Thomas Peniston of Hawridge. She predeceased him without issue.
