= Lyveden New Bield =

Grade I listed building in Northamptonshire, England

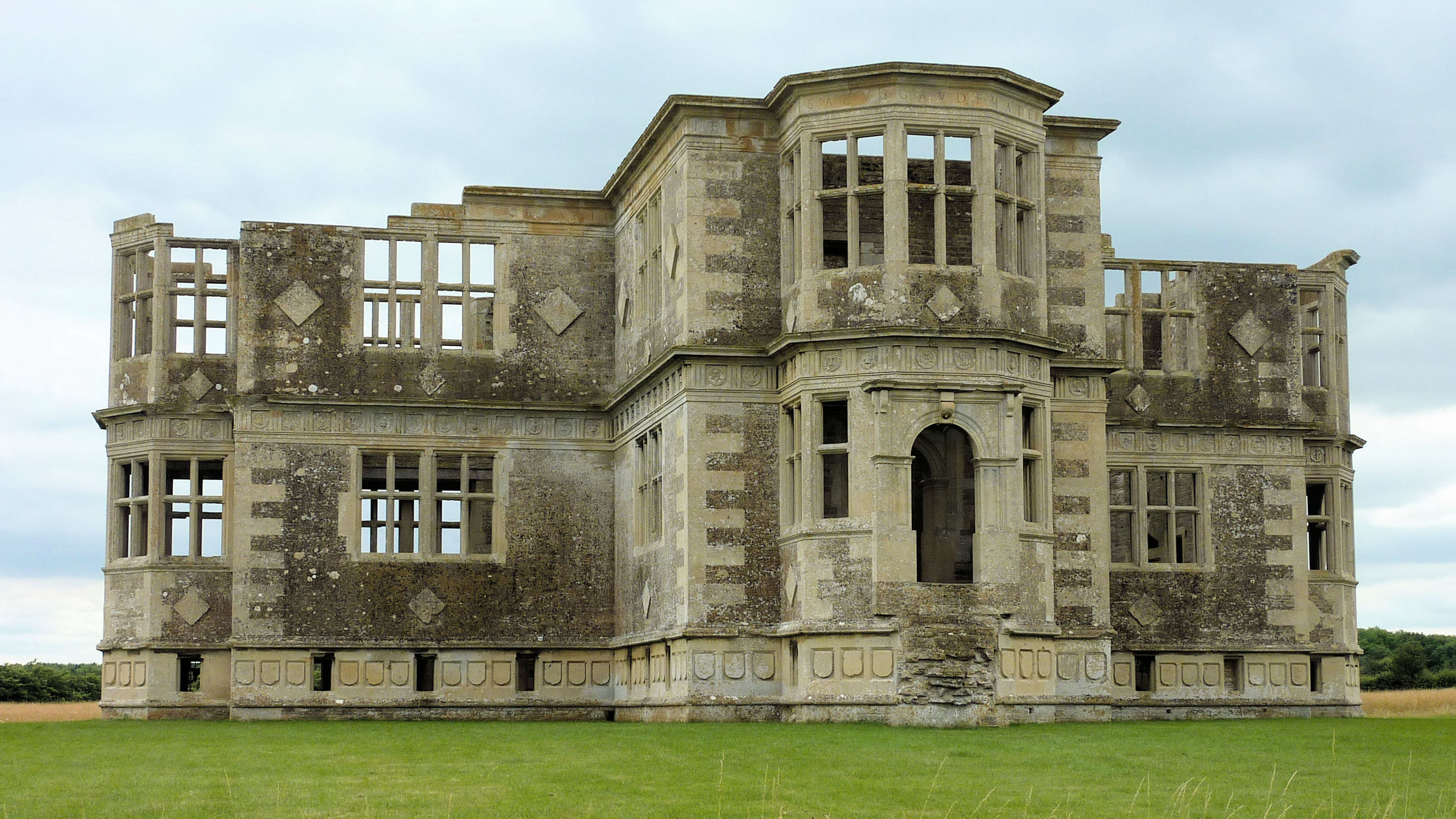
- Lyveden New Bield

- Location within Northamptonshire

General information
- Type: unfinished country house
- Architectural style: Elizabethan
- Location: 4 miles west of Oundle, England
- Coordinates: 52°27′25″N 0°33′12″W
- Opened: circa 1604–05
- Owner: National Trust

Technical details
- Material: Structure constructed from stone

Lyveden New Bield (sometimes called New Build) is an unfinished Elizabethan summer house in the parish of Aldwincle in North Northamptonshire, commissioned by Sir Thomas Tresham and now owned by the National Trust. It is a Grade I listed building, classing it as a 'building of exceptional interest.'

== Construction ==
It was constructed for Sir Thomas Tresham, the fervent Roman Catholic of Rushton Hall, and is thought to have been designed by Robert Stickells. The exact date is unknown but can be estimated to circa 1604–05, the year of Tresham's death. The New Bield was on the estate of Tresham's second home, Lyveden Manor House, also known as Lyveden Old Bield.

== Design and Catholic motifs ==
Just as at Tresham's smaller folly, Rushton Triangular Lodge, his principal estate, the New Bield has a religious design full of symbolism. Designed on a plan reminiscent of a Greek cross, the facades have a strict symmetry. The building has two floors above a raised basement, with mullioned and transomed windows. Each floor had three rooms with a staircase in the south projection of the cross.

The exterior of the building is decorated by friezes of a religious nature. The metopes contain the emblems and motifs found also at the triangular lodge, such as the "IHS" christogram.

== Purpose as a 'Secret House' ==
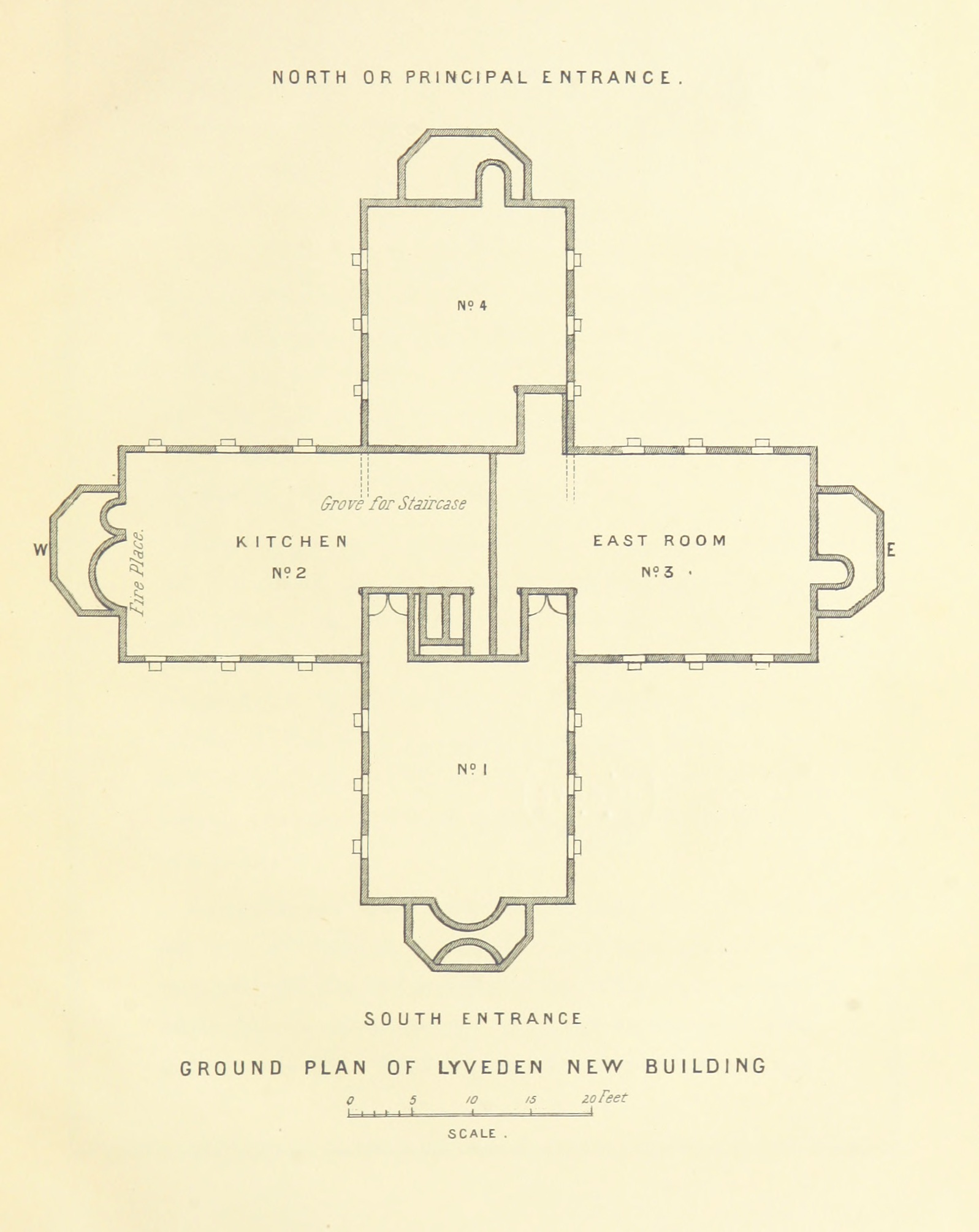
Ground Plan of Lyveden New Building.

The house was likely meant for occupation, as it has a great hall and parlour on the first floor, kitchen and buttery in the basement, and a bedroom on the upper floor. However, it was probably never intended for full-time occupation. Too close to the main house for use as a hunting lodge, it may have been intended for use as a "Secret House"—keeping a secret house was a custom of the 16th century. Often within a mile of the main house, the secret house was a place where the head of the household would retire for a few days with a minimum of servants, while the principal house was thoroughly cleaned and, bearing in mind the sanitation of the time, fumigated. Similar examples of "secret houses" exist at Leconfield and Warkworth, where their use for this purpose has been well documented.

Lyveden New Bield was never completed. It remains as it was when the builders left following Sir Thomas Tresham's death. Today, it is in the care of the National Trust.

== Lyveden Old Bield ==
Lyveden Manor House, now also known as Lyveden Old Bield, the once grand principal house of the estate, had belonged to the Tresham family from c.1450. Today, little remains and what does was probably built by Thomas Tresham's grandson Lewis. The gatehouse has been removed to Fermyn Woods Hall, and the staircase was transported to America, where it was incorporated in the Edsel and Eleanor Ford House near Detroit. One wing remains with mullioned windows.

In 2013, the National Trust acquired Lyveden Manor House, it is open to the public, with the Trust's long-term aim to restore the historic gardens and open them to the public.

== Gardens and orchard ==
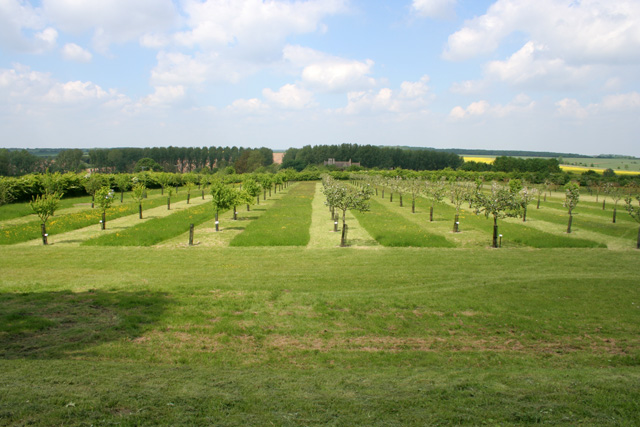
Orchard, Lyveden New Bield.

Set on 60 acres Lyveden lies in the heart of the medieval Royal Forest of Rockingham. Tresham designed extensive gardens between the manor house and the New Bield, but for centuries little evidence of the gardens remained. However, in 2010, National Trust experts studying photographs taken by the Luftwaffe during the Second World War discovered the remains of an Elizabethan labyrinth, garden and orchard in the grounds. The gardens were subsequently upgraded to a Grade I listing by English Heritage.

The National Trust has reconstructed Tresham's orchard, which originally contained 300 fruit and nut trees, as well as restored the moat on three sides of the labyrinth.

== The Tresham family and the Gunpowder Plot ==
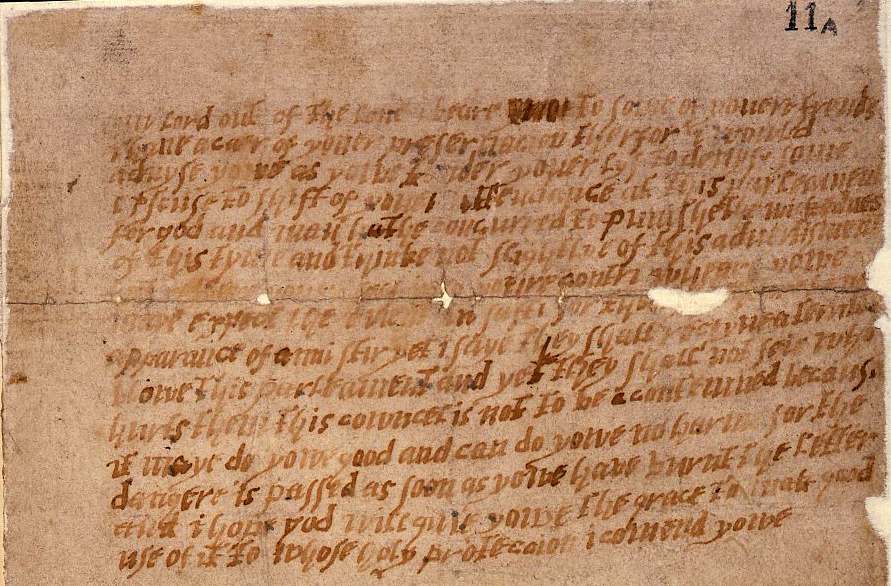
An anonymous letter, sent to William Parker, 4th Baron Monteagle, was instrumental in revealing the plot's existence. Its author's identity has never been reliably established, although Francis Tresham has long been a suspect.

Sir Thomas Tresham died in 1605 following decades of religious persecution, his once vast wealth having been severely depleted. His son Francis Tresham inherited the estate, but within the same year, along with his cousins Robert Catesby and Robert and Thomas Wintour, he became involved in the Gunpowder Plot. Thus, within a year the estate had a third owner, Francis's son Lewis Tresham. The estate was managed by Lewis's mother until her death in 1615.

After this, Lewis Tresham, a spendthrift, lost the remaining family wealth. The estate was eventually sold following the death of his son in 1643.
