= Walter of Preston =

Walter of Preston (died 1230), also known as Walter Fitz Winemar, was sheriff of Northamptonshire in 1207 and 1208, and held some post in connection with the forests. He had custody of Fotheringay Castle in 1212 and apparently sided with the barons, as his lands were taken into the king's hands. In 1227 and 1228 he was employed to assess the fifteenth in Warwickshire and Leicestershire, and to fix the tallage in the counties of Northampton, Buckingham and Bedford. His son was Gilbert of Preston.

== Sources ==
- Brand, Paul (2008). "Preston, Sir Gilbert of (b. in or before 1209, d. 1274), justice". Oxford Dictionary of National Biography (online ed.). Oxford University Press. doi:10.1093/ref:odnb/22724. (Subscription or UK public library membership required.)

Attribution:

- This article incorporates text from a publication now in the public domain: Lee, Sidney, ed. (1896). "Preston, Gilbert de". Dictionary of National Biography. Vol. 46. London: Smith, Elder & Co. p. 306.
