= Rushton Triangular Lodge =

Folly in Rushton, Northamptonshire, England

Coordinates: 52.4393°N 0.7799°W

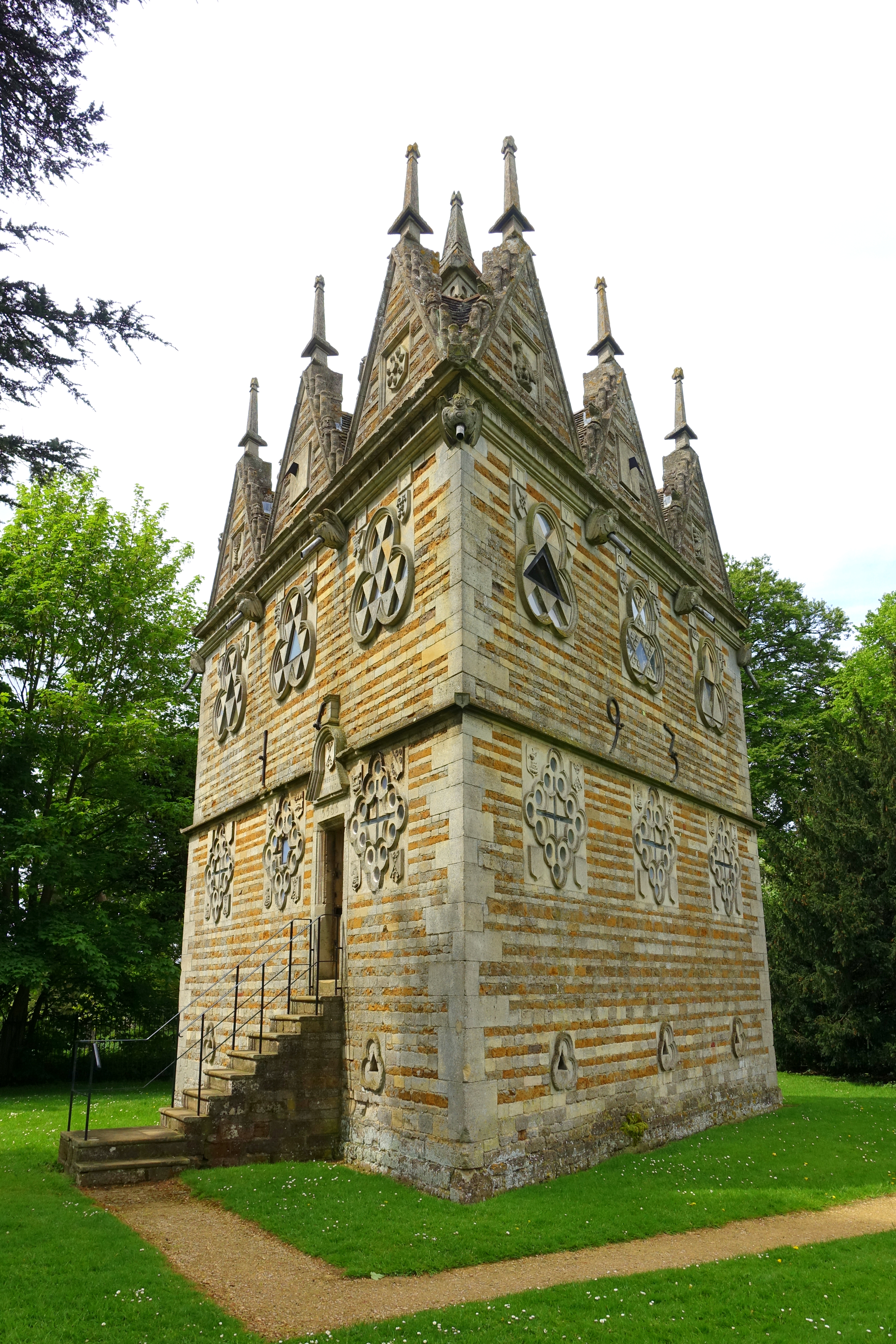
Rushton Triangular Lodge

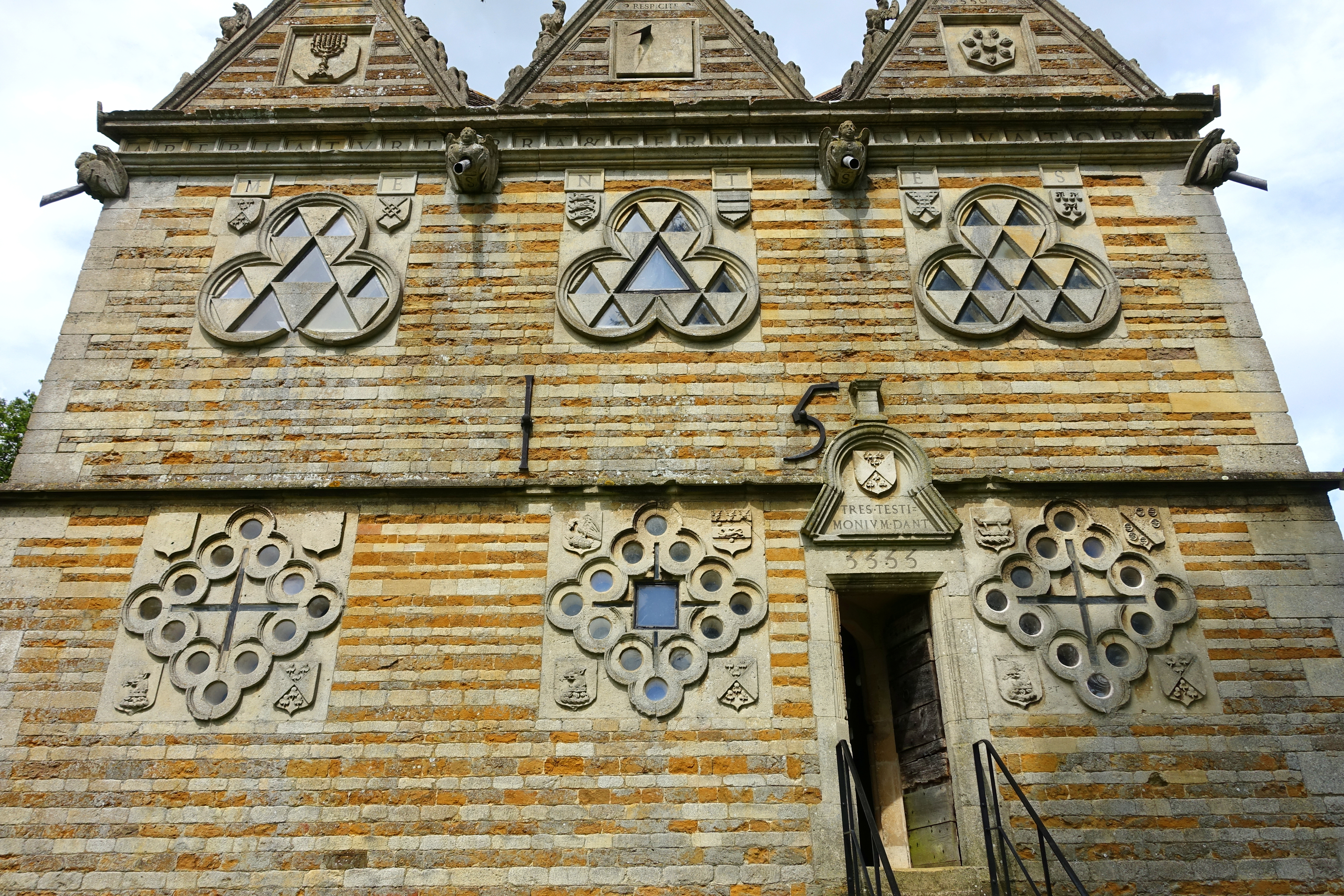
Symbols and inscriptions on the '15' side

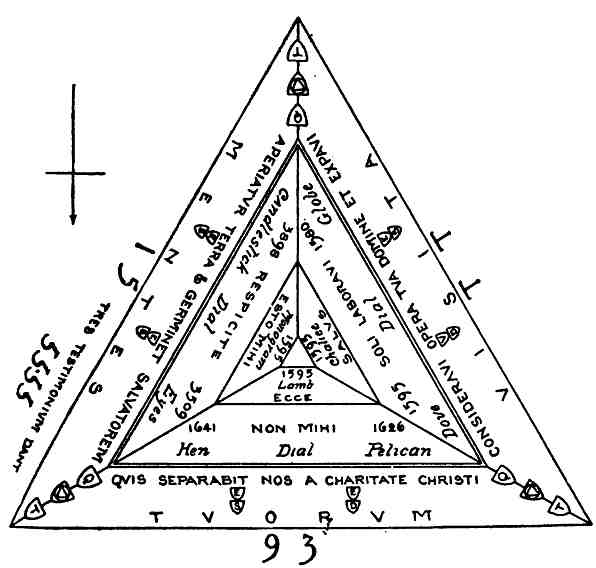
Schematic diagram

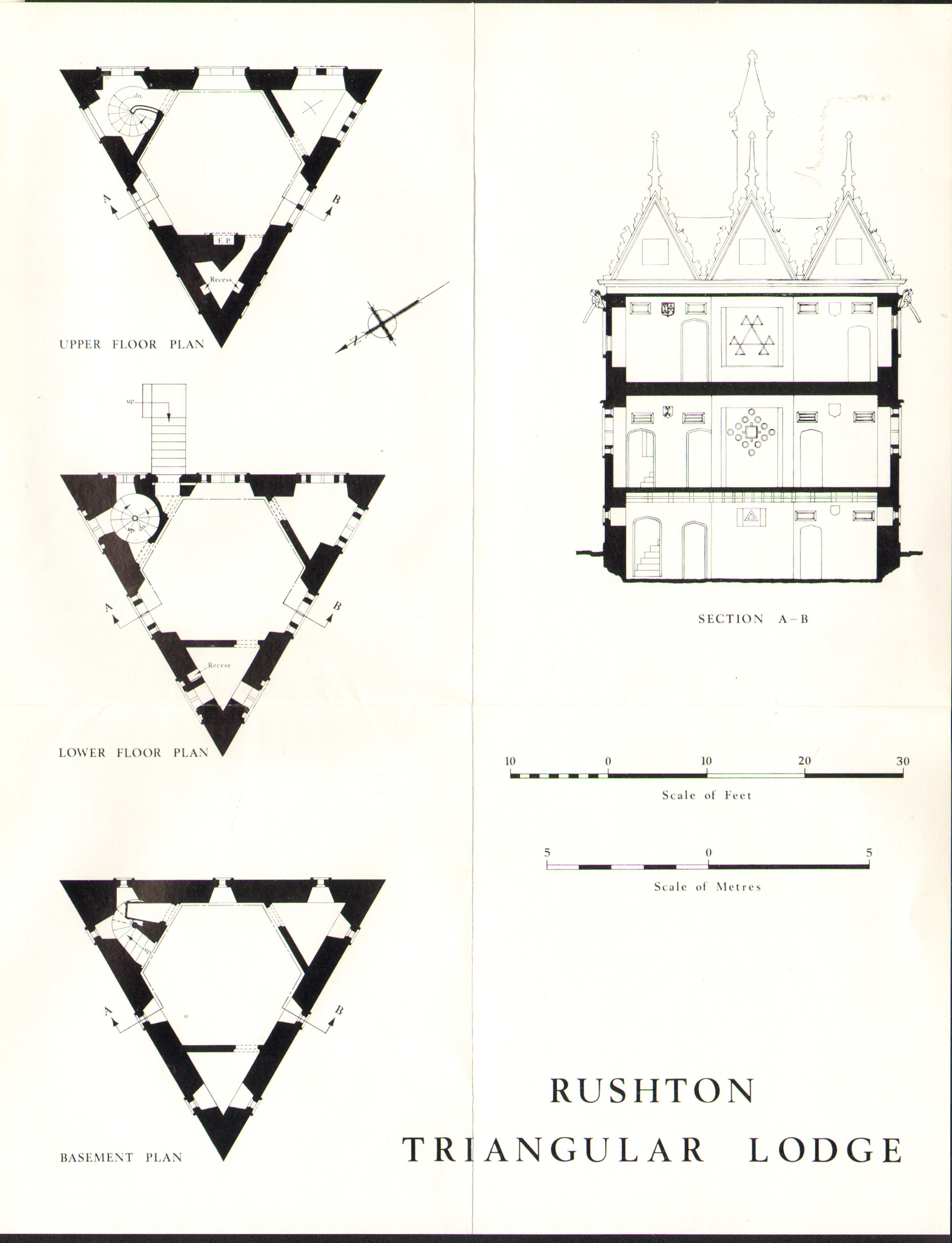
Plans and section of the lodge

The Triangular Lodge is a folly, designed by Sir Thomas Tresham and constructed between 1593 and 1597 near Rushton, Northamptonshire, England. It is now in the care of English Heritage. The stone used for the construction was alternating bands of dark and light limestone.

== History ==
The lodge is Grade I listed on the National Heritage List for England. Tresham was a Roman Catholic who was imprisoned for fifteen years in the late 16th century for refusing to convert to Protestantism. On his release in 1593, he designed the Lodge as a protestation of his faith. His belief in the Holy Trinity is represented everywhere in the Lodge by the number three: it has three walls 33 feet long, each with three triangular windows and surmounted by three gargoyles. One wall is inscribed '15', another '93', and the last 'TT'. The building has three floors, upon a basement, and a triangular chimney. Three Latin texts, each 33 letters long, run around the building on each facade. The quotations are:

1. Aperiatur terra & germinet Salvatorem: "Let the earth open and … bring forth salvation" (Isaiah 45:8)
2. Quis separabit nos a charitate Christi?: "Who shall separate us from the love of Christ?" (Romans 8:35)
3. Consideravi opera tua, Domine, et expavi : "I have contemplated thy works, O Lord, and was afraid" (a paraphrase of Habakkuk 3:2)

The windows on each floor are of different designs, all equally ornate. The largest, those on the first floor, are in the form of a trefoil, which was the emblem of the Tresham family. The basement windows are small trefoils with a triangular pane at their centre. The windows on the ground floor are of a lozenge design, each having 12 small circular openings surrounding a central cruciform slit. Heraldic devices of various families surround these windows.

The slightly raised ground floor has an entrance in the south-east facade. Over the door, beneath Tresham's coat of arms, is the Latin inscription: Tres testimonium dant , meaning "The number three bears witness" or "Tresham bears witness" (Tres was the pet name his wife used for Tresham in her letters). Also above the door are the numbers "5555". The figures are oddly shaped, and architectural historian Nikolaus Pevsner speculated that this may once have read "3333", but that number seems to have no particular significance. It has, however, been pointed out that if 1593 is subtracted from 5555, it leaves 3962 (the date, BC, of the Flood, according to Bede).

The principal room on each floor is hexagonal, thus leaving the three corner spaces triangular; one of these spaces contains a spiral staircase, the remaining two are small rooms. The building is crowned, above the quotations on each facade, by three steep gables each surmounted by a three-sided obelisk at the apex. Among the emblems carved on the gables are, on the southeast side, the highly symbolic seven-branched candelabrum within an octagonal plaque, and a heptagonal plaque depicting the seven eyes of God. On the north side are a Pelican in her piety, a symbol of Christ and the Eucharist, and a Hen and Chickens; on the southwest gable are a Dove and Serpent; and the Hand of God touching a globe. The triangular chimney is adorned with the holy monogram "IHS", a lamb and cross, and a chalice.

While the lodge is indisputably a testament to Tresham's faith, it is also an example of the Elizabethan love of allegory. Carved in the gables are the numbers "3509" and "3898": these are said to be the dates (BC) of the Creation and the Calling of Abraham. Among the more recent dates carved on the building are 1580, thought to be the date of Tresham's conversion, and also the future (at the time of their carving) dates 1626 and 1641 - to what do they refer? One suggestion is that not only are they divisible by three, but that, when 1593 is subtracted from them, they give 33 and 48, the years in which Jesus and the Virgin Mary are said to have died.

The broken inscriptions inscribed on each gable combine to read "Respicite non mihi laboravi", which means "Behold I have not laboured for myself alone".

The Lodge was the only building Tresham designed which he saw completed before his death in 1605. Nikolaus Pevsner in his The Buildings of England: Northamptonshire states: "as a testament of faith this building must be viewed with respect". He also considered the lodge so architecturally important that he chose its photograph for the front cover of the first edition (1961) of his book; it also features on the cover of the 1973 edition.

The Lodge figures prominently in the chapter of Alan Moore's novel Voice of the Fire concerning Tresham's son Francis, a Gunpowder Plot conspirator. Moore, a Northampton native, touches on the history of several local sites in his speculative magical realist history of the town. It is also featured on the cover of the album Sun Structures released in February 2014 by the English psychedelic band Temples.

== See also ==
- Lyveden New Bield
