= Ralph Green (MP) =

15th-century English politician

Ralph Green (c. 1379 – 1417), of Drayton, Northamptonshire, was an English Member of Parliament for Northamptonshire in October 1404 and 1410.
