= Rushton, Northamptonshire =

Village in Northamptonshire, England

Coordinates: 52.433955°N 0.758513°W

Rushton
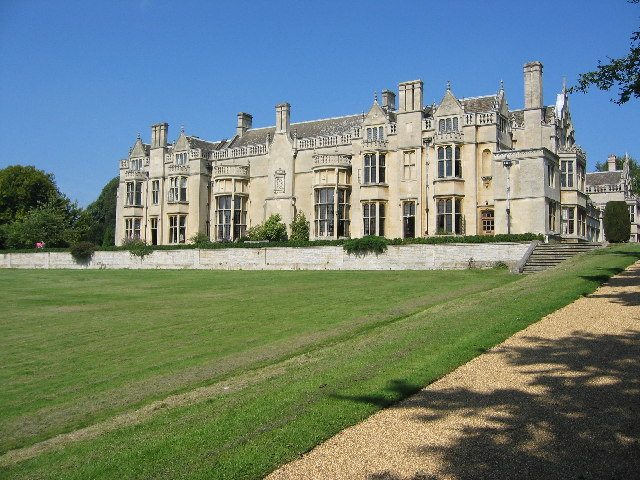
- Rushton Hall

- Location within Northamptonshire
- Population: 461
- OS grid reference: SP8482
- Civil parish: Rushton
- Unitary authority: North Northamptonshire
- Ceremonial county: Northamptonshire
- Region: East Midlands
- Country: England
- Sovereign state: United Kingdom
- Post town: Kettering
- Postcode district: NN14
- Dialling code: 01536
- Police: Northamptonshire
- Fire: Northamptonshire
- Ambulance: East Midlands
- UK Parliament: Kettering

Rushton is a village and civil parish in Northamptonshire. It is about 2 miles (3.2 km) north-east of Rothwell and 3 miles (4.8 km) north-west of Kettering. The parish covers 3,200 acres (1,300 ha) and is situated on both sides of the River Ise. It contains the sites of three deserted settlements, details of which are set out below.

The village's name means 'farm/settlement which is rushy'.

At the time of the 2001 census, the parish's population was 452 people, increasing slightly to 461 at the 2011 Census. The village has a primary school a pub opposite the village cricket pitch, a health retreat, bed and breakfast and hotel.

There is a bus service that runs through the village linking Rushton to neighbouring towns. It goes hourly and the bus stop is opposite the pub, the Thornhill arms.

== Buildings ==
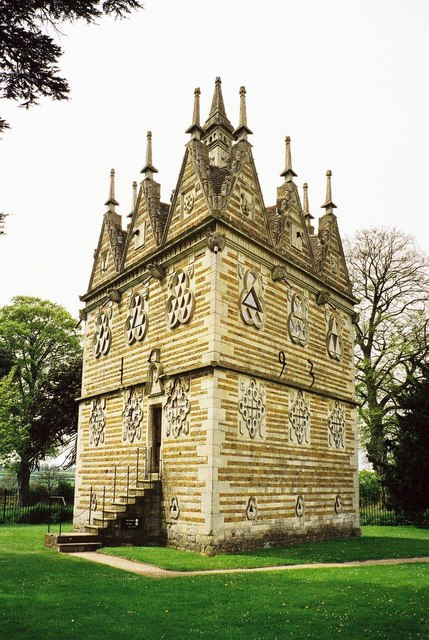
Rushton Triangular Lodge

The village is home to Rushton Triangular Lodge which is in the former grounds of Rushton Hall, which is 0.5 miles (0.80 km) west of the village; the hall is currently a hotel.

All Saints' Church is of Norman origin but mostly 14th-century with 19th-century restorations in 1853 and 1869 by Edmund Francis Law. There is a monument to Sir Thomas Tresham (died 8 March 1559) of Rushton Hall.

Other notable buildings in the village include a Manor House east of the church, Manor Farm House (17th-century) and the Georgian Old Rectory.

== Deserted settlements ==
The location, history and remaining physical evidence of three deserted settlements within the parish have been systematically documented.

Barford - This lay near Barford Lodge and is listed in the Domesday Book with seven recorded inhabitants. In 1516, George Boyvil enclosed 86 acres of arable land at Barford and it was reported that "almost the whole village" was destroyed. The chapel that formerly served this village was no longer in existence in the early 18th century.

Glendon - This was immediately east of Glendon Hall, with a recorded population of fourteen in the Domesday Book. In 1327, there were ten tenants on the manor. In 1514, Robert Malory enclosed 494 acres of arable land as well as pasture. At that time, nine out of the twelve houses were destroyed.

Rushton St Peter - The site of this settlement is in the area of Rushton Hall. It was listed along with Rushton All Saints in the Domesday Book with a combined recorded population of 45. In the 1524 Subsidy Returns, only ten people paid tax at St Peter's parish, compared to 28 in All Saints. In the early 18th century, it was recorded that the only buildings in St Peter's parish were the hall, the church and four or five shepherd's lodges. The two Rushton parishes were united in 1780 and a faculty was granted in 1799 for the demolition of St Peter's church.
