= Aldwincle =

Village in Northamptonshire, England

Coordinates: 52.41°N 00.53°W

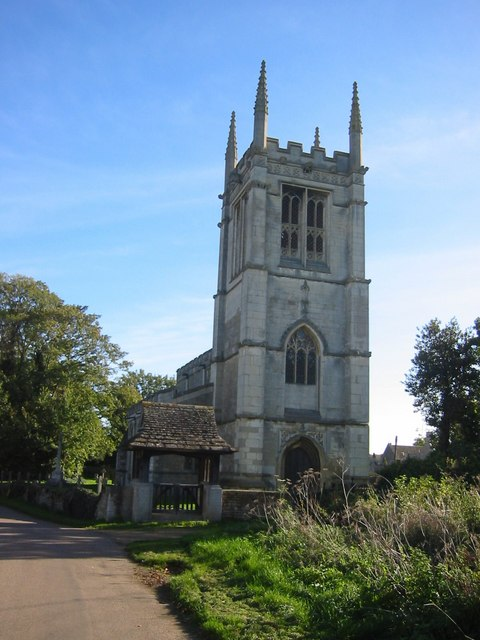
- All Saints' Church

- Location within Northamptonshire
- Population: 322 (2011 census)
- OS grid reference: TL0081
- Civil parish: Aldwincle
- Unitary authority: North Northamptonshire
- Ceremonial county: Northamptonshire
- Region: East Midlands
- Country: England
- Sovereign state: United Kingdom
- Post town: Kettering
- Postcode district: NN14
- Police: Northamptonshire
- Fire: Northamptonshire
- Ambulance: East Midlands

Aldwincle (sometimes Aldwinkle or Aldwinckle) is a village and civil parish in the North Northamptonshire district, in Northamptonshire, England, with a population at the time of the 2011 census of 322. It stands by a bend in the River Nene, 4 miles (6.4 km) to the north of Thrapston. The name of the village means "Ealda's nook".

== Historic buildings ==
The ecclesiastical parishes of Aldwincle All Saints and Aldwincle St Peter merged in 1879. All Saints was declared redundant in 1971. Being also a designated Grade I listed building, it is cared for by the Churches Conservation Trust. Also listed Grade I are St Peter's Church, Lyveden New Bield (and gardens), and Lyveden Old Bield.

The civil parishes of Aldwincle All Saints and Aldwincle St Peter merged six years after the ecclesiastical parishes, in 1885.

The small primary school, Aldwincle Trinity, opened in 1976.

The village rectory was the birthplace of the English poet John Dryden, the English historian Thomas Fuller, and the English Civil War figure Charles Fleetwood, as well as the home of poet Mary Rolls.

== See also ==
- Lyveden New Bield
