= William Parr, 1st Baron Parr of Horton =

English nobleman and soldier

William Parr, 1st Baron Parr of Horton (c. 1483 – 10 September 1547) was the son of Sir William Parr and his second wife, the Hon. Elizabeth Fitzhugh, later Lady Vaux of Harrowden.

== Life ==
William Parr was a military man who fought in France, where he was knighted by King Henry VIII at Tournai Cathedral, and Scotland. Parr seemed to be uncomfortable in court circles and insecure in securing relationships. Nonetheless, he accompanied the King at the 'Field of the Cloth of Gold' in France. Like his brother, Sir Thomas Parr, William flourished under Sir Nicholas Vaux.

William was also a family man. After the death of his brother, Sir Thomas, William's sister-in-law Maud, widowed at age 25, called upon him to help in financial matters and to manage her estates in North England while she was busy in the south securing a future for her three children. William had been named one of the executors of his brother's will. Along with Cuthbert Tunstall, a distant kinsman of the Parr's, they provided the kind of protection and father figure which was missing in the lives of Maud's children. William's children were educated alongside Maud's children.

Although William was inadept at handling his financial matters, he was ironically appointed the office of Chamberlain in the separate household of the Duke of Richmond, the acknowledged illegitimate son of King Henry VIII and Elizabeth Blount, based at Sheriff Hutton Castle in Yorkshire.

It was William who found a spot for his nephew, William Parr, later Earl of Essex, in the Duke's household where he would be educated by the very best tutors and mixed with the sons of other prominent families. Though thought to be a wonderful environment for Parr and his nephew to flourish in, the household was not a great passport to success as Parr hoped for. Henry VIII was very fond of his illegitimate son, but had no intention of naming him his heir. It has been claimed that Parr and his sister-in-law, Maud Parr, coached William to make sure that he ingratiated himself with the Duke, in case the Duke became heir to the throne but there is no factual evidence to support this claim.

Although Parr was named Chamberlain of the Duke's household, the household was actually controlled by Cardinal Thomas Wolsey in London. This control by Wolsey diminished any opportunity of Parr gaining financial benefit or wider influence. Along with the limited possibilities came other daily frustrations as the Duke's tutors and the household officers under Parr disagreed on the balance of recreation and study. Parr was a countryman who thought it perfectly normal for boys to prefer hunting and sports to the boring rhetoric of learning Latin and Greek. As the Duke's behaviour became more unruly Parr and his colleagues found it quite amusing. The Duke's tutor, John Palsgrave, who had only been employed six months, would not tolerate being undermined and decided to resign. Such was the household which Parr presided over. Parr was suspicious of schoolmaster priests and anyone of lesser birth, even though he was not considered a nobleman at the time. The experience did not further the Parr family. If Sir William had spent more attention to his duties and responsibilities he may have reaped some sort of advancement; thus when the overmanned and over budgeted household was dissolved in the summer of 1529, Parr found himself embittered by his failure to find any personal advancement or profit from the whole ordeal.

Despite his failed attempts at achieving personal gain from the household of the Duke, Sir William made up for it during the Pilgrimage of Grace during 1536. William showed impeccable loyalty to the Crown during the rebellion. He had been in Lincolnshire along with the Duke of Suffolk and supervised the executions at Louth and Horncastle. William tried to ingratiate himself with the Duke of Norfolk and Thomas Cromwell. Parr's presence at the execution in Hull of Sir Robert Constable prompted Cromwell to share in confidence a correspondence in which he received from the Duke of Norfolk on William's "goodness" which "never proved the like in any friend before."

Parr was a strong supporter of the new religion under Henry VIII and he became Thomas Cromwell's chief agent for the dissolution of the monasteries in Northamptonshire.

== Offices ==
Sir William was Sheriff of Northamptonshire in 1518, 1522, 1534 and 1538. He was also Esquire of the Body to Henry VII and Henry VIII. In addition to this, he was a third cousin to King Henry VIII through his mother. William was appointed Chamberlain to his niece Queen Catherine and when she became Queen regent during Henry's time in France, Catherine appointed William part of her council. Although he was too ill to attend meetings, the appointment shows her confidence in her uncle.

Parr was knighted by King Henry VIII after the siege of Tournai in October 1513. He was elected to parliament as knight of the shire for Northamptonshire in 1529 and 1539.

He was made a peer of the realm as 1st Baron Parr of Horton, Northamptonshire on 23 December 1543. Upon his death in 1547 he was buried at Horton, where the inscription on his monument wrongly gives his year of death as 1546. With no male heirs, the barony became extinct.

== Family ==
He married Mary Salisbury, the daughter and co-heiress of Sir William Salisbury; who brought as her dowry the manor of Horton. It was a happy marriage which produced four daughters who survived infancy. In 1517 he named his eldest daughter to be his sole heir.

- Maud (Magdalen) Parr, who married Sir Ralph Lane of Orlingbury. Maud grew up with her cousin Catherine Parr, who became the last queen of King Henry VIII. She became a lady-in-waiting and was among the queen's close circle. Maud would become a lifelong friend and confidante of the queen. She was with her cousin as Dowager queen and was one of her ladies at Sudeley Castle.
- Anne Parr, who married Sir John Digby.
- Elizabeth Parr, who married Sir Nicholas Wodhull (modern spelling: Woodhull).
- Mary Parr, who married Sir Thomas Tresham.

Lord Parr and his wife are ancestors of William, Prince of Wales through his late mother, Diana, Princess of Wales. They descend from both Maud, Lady Lane and Mary, Lady Tresham.

He is buried at Horton where the family estate was.

== Sources ==
- James, Susan E. "Parr, William, Baron Parr of Horton". Oxford Dictionary of National Biography (online ed.). Oxford University Press. doi:10.1093/ref:odnb/58528. (Subscription, Wikipedia Library access or UK public library membership required.)
