= Thomas Tresham (died 1605) =

English Catholic landowner (1543–1605)

Sir Thomas Tresham (1543 – 11 September 1605) was a prominent recusant Catholic landowner in Elizabethan Northamptonshire. He died two years after the accession of James VI and I.

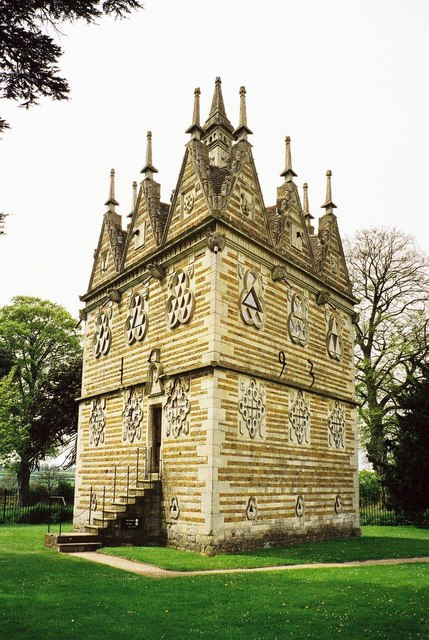
Rushton Triangular Lodge

== Life ==
Tresham was brought up in the Throckmorton household. He inherited large estates in 1559 from his grandfather and namesake Thomas Tresham I, establishing him as a member of the Catholic elite. Through his grandmother, a daughter of William Parr, 1st Baron Parr of Horton, he was related to Queen Catherine, sixth wife of Henry VIII. He was widely regarded as clever and well educated, a correspondent of William Cecil, the Secretary of State to Queen Elizabeth, and Sir Christopher Hatton, the Lord Chancellor.

Well read, Tresham dedicated much of his life to collecting books. He was chosen as High Sheriff of Northamptonshire in 1573 and was knighted at the Queen's Royal Progress at Kenilworth in 1575. He frequently entertained large numbers of friends and acquaintances and pursued a successful reforming estate policy. His recusancy, Jesuit connections and arguments for the state's lack of jurisdiction in matters of conscience made him the subject of official attention, and he was imprisoned several times and fined heavily. At a time when Queen Elizabeth was anxious about the Catholic threat posed by Spain and by her cousin Mary, Queen of Scots, Catholics were made targets for persecution by their spiritual loyalty to another temporal power (the Pope and, consequently, in the view of Protestants, the Catholic king of Spain). Between 1581 and 1605, Tresham paid penalties totalling just under £8,000 (equivalent to £2.1 million in 2025). These heavy financial demands were, in reality, overshadowed by the expense of his building projects and his insistence on making advantageous marriages for his six daughters, bringing with them sizeable dowries (£12,200). His credit was thus impaired, and the ill-advised involvement of his son, Francis, in the Earl of Essex's rebellion, cost him over £3,000. As a Catholic known for his connection to the Jesuit Edmund Campion, and who argued for an individual's right to act according to his conscience unmolested, he was tarred with the brush of disloyalty, a mark he fiercely rejected. Ultimately, his son Lewis successfully ate through what little family money was left.

He left three notable buildings in Northamptonshire, the extraordinary Rushton Triangular Lodge and the unfinished Lyveden New Bield, both of which embody the strength of his faith. The Triangular Lodge bears witness to Tresham's fidelity to the doctrine of the Trinity. There was also a more personal connection: above the door, we find the inscription 'Tres testimonium dant' ('the three bear witness', or, perhaps, 'Tres bears witness'). 'Tres' may be a moment of self-reference; it was his wife's pet name for him. Tresham himself was the architect of these designs, and the extant family papers in the British Library reveal some of his plans. His sense of civic responsibility in local society, occasioned by his gentility and the expectations of his rank and family practice, led him to begin building the Market House at Rothwell in 1577, thought to be a sessions house and decorated with the arms of other local families. Sir Thomas was a considerable landowner at his death in 1605, but his estate had £11,000 of debt (equivalent to £2.89 million in 2025).

== Marriage and children ==
In 1566, he married Muriel, a daughter of Sir Robert Throckmorton and Elizabeth Hussey. Throckmorton was the grandson of Elizabeth FitzHugh, who was mother to William Parr, 1st Baron Parr of Horton by her first marriage. Lord Parr was a great-grandfather of Tresham. The Throckmorton family was a wealthy Catholic family from Coughton Court in Warwickshire and Tresham had been Sir Robert's ward. Muriel Tresham once wrote to the Countess of Bedford for her help, as a "lowly wife on my knees with importunacy."

Thomas and Muriel had eleven children, including;

- Francis (d. December 1605)
- Mary (d. 13 October 1664); married Thomas Brudenell, 1st Earl of Cardigan
- Elizabeth; married William Parker, 4th Baron Monteagle
- Frances; married Edward Stourton, 10th Baron Stourton
- Catherine (died 1623), who married Sir John Webb and was mother to Sir John Webb, 1st Baronet. Catherine, Lady Webb, was killed in the accident known as the Fatal Vespers.
- Bridget; married Edward Parham (died 1633).

His elder son, Francis, inherited the titles, estate and debt, and became embroiled in the Gunpowder Plot later that year along with his cousins Robert Catesby and Thomas Wintour. Imprisoned for his actions, Francis met an early death from natural causes in December 1605, avoiding certain execution. Nevertheless, he was decapitated after his death and his head was displayed as that of a notorious traitor. His role in the plot has been the subject of debate by historians and it has been largely accepted that he was the author of the famous 'Monteagle Letter'. However widely agreed his authorship of the letter to his relative, it remains conjectural.
