= Francis Tresham =

English Gunpowder Plot conspirator (c. 1567–1605)

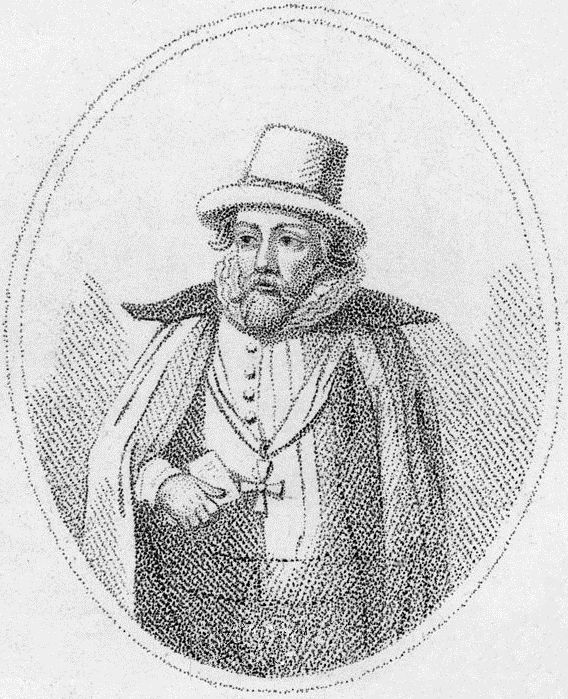
- Born: c. 1567
- Died: 23 December 1605 (aged 37–38); Tower of London
- Cause of death: Strangury
- Spouse: Anne Tufton
- Children: 3
- Parent(s): Sir Thomas Tresham, Meriel Throckmorton
- Motive: Gunpowder Plot, a conspiracy to assassinate King James VI & I and members of the Houses of Parliament

Details
- Role: Funding
- Enlisted: 14 October 1605

Francis Tresham (c. 1567 – 23 December 1605) was a member of the group of English provincial Catholics who planned the failed Gunpowder Plot of 1605, a conspiracy to assassinate King James I of England.

Tresham joined the Earl of Essex's failed rebellion against the government in 1601, for which he was imprisoned. Only his family's intervention and his father's money saved him from attainder. Despite this, he became involved in two missions to Catholic Spain to seek support for English Catholics (then heavily persecuted), and finally with the Gunpowder Plotters.

According to his confession, Tresham joined the plot in October 1605. Its leader, Robert Catesby, asked him to provide a large sum of money and the use of Rushton Hall, but Tresham apparently provided neither, instead giving a much smaller amount of money to fellow plotter Thomas Wintour. Tresham also expressed concern that if the plot was successful, two of his brothers-in-law would be killed. An anonymous letter delivered to one of them, William Parker, 4th Baron Monteagle, found its way to the English Secretary of State, Robert Cecil, an event which eventually proved decisive in the conspiracy's failure.

Historians have long suspected that Tresham wrote the letter, a hypothesis that remains unproven. Catesby and Wintour shared the same suspicion and threatened to kill him, but he was able to convince them otherwise. He was arrested on 12 November and confined to the Tower of London. In his confession, he sought to allay his involvement in the plot, but never mentioned the letter. He died of natural causes on 23 December 1605.

== Family and life before 1605 ==
Born in about 1567, Francis Tresham was the eldest son of Sir Thomas Tresham, of Rushton Hall in Northamptonshire, and Meriel Throckmorton, daughter of Sir Robert Throckmorton of Coughton in Warwickshire and his wife Elizabeth Hussey. According to the antiquary Anthony Wood, Tresham was educated in Oxford at either St John's College or Gloucester Hall or both, although biographer Mark Nicholls mentions that there appears to be no other evidence to corroborate that claim.

Francis is said to have been a fellow prisoner with Robert Catesby held in Wisbech Castle at the time of the Spanish Armada.

He married Anne Tufton, daughter of Sir John Tufton of Hothfield in Kent, in 1593. The couple had three children, twins Lucy and Thomas (b.1598), and Elizabeth. Thomas died in infancy, Lucy became a nun in Brussels, and Elizabeth married Sir George Heneage of Hainton, Lincolnshire.

Tresham's father, born near the end of Henry VIII's reign, was regarded by the Catholic community as one of its leaders. Thomas was received into the Catholic Church in 1580, and in the same year he allowed the Jesuit Edmund Campion to stay at his house in Hoxton. For the latter, following Campion's capture in 1581, he was tried in Star Chamber. Thomas's refusal to fully comply with his interrogators was the beginning of years of fines and spells in prison. He proclaimed the accession of James I to the English throne, but the king's promises to Thomas of forestry commissions and an end to recusancy fines were not kept. His finances were seriously depleted by fines of £7,720 for recusancy, and the spending of £12,200 on the marriages of six daughters meant that when he died in 1605, his estate was £11,500 in debt.

Author Antonia Fraser suggests that as a young man Francis became "resentful of his father's authority and profligate with his father's money." Authors Peter Marshall and Geoffrey Scott describe him as possessing a "somewhat hot-headed nature", while another source calls him a "wild unstayed man". The Jesuit priest Oswald Tesimond wrote that he was "a man of sound judgement. He knew how to look after himself, but was not much to be trusted". While still young he assaulted a man and his pregnant daughter, claiming that their family owed his father money. Tresham spent time in prison for this offence.

On 8 February 1601 he joined the Earl of Essex in open rebellion against the government. Essex's aim was to secure his own ambitions, but the Jesuit Henry Garnet described the young men who accompanied him as being interested mostly in furthering the Catholic cause. Captured and imprisoned, Tresham appealed to Katherine Howard, Lady Howard de Walden, but was rebuked. His sister, Lady Monteagle, alerted his cousin John Throckmorton, who turned to "three most honorable parsons and one especiall instrument" for help. The identity of these individuals is unclear, but Tresham was promised freedom on the condition that over the next three months his father pay £2,100 to William Ayloffe, to "save his lyef attainder in bloode." He was released on 21 June. The experience did not dissuade him from engaging in further conspiracies; in 1602 and 1603 he was involved in the missions to Catholic Spain made by Thomas Wintour, Anthony Dutton (possibly an alias of Christopher Wright) and Guy Fawkes, later dubbed by the English government as the Spanish Treason. However, upon James's accession to the throne, he told Thomas Wintour (secretary to Tresham's brother-in-law William Parker, 4th Baron Monteagle), that he would "stand wholly for the King", and "to have no speech with him of Spain."

His father tried to have him appointed as keeper of the deer parks at Brigstock. This was resisted by the villagers in May 1603, who objected to the Tresham family's recusancy. One of Tresham's servants Thomas Walker was installed at a lodge in Brigstock and Catholics gathered at the lodge at night.

== Plot ==
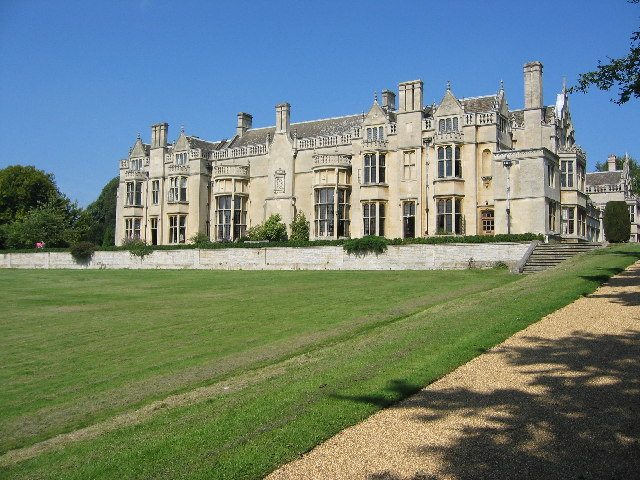
Rushton Hall

English Catholics had hoped that the persecution of their faith would end when James succeeded Elizabeth I, as he appeared to hold more moderate views toward Catholics than his predecessor but Robert Catesby, a religious zealot also imprisoned for his involvement in the Essex rebellion, had grown tired of James's supposed perfidy and planned to kill the king. He hoped to achieve this by blowing up the House of Lords with gunpowder and inciting a popular revolt to install James's daughter Princess Elizabeth as titular Queen.

Catesby had recruited 11 fellow Catholics to his cause but was running out of money. Even with his debts, with an annual income of over £3,000 Tresham was one of the wealthiest people known to the plotters, and Catesby's mother was Anne Throckmorton, an aunt of Tresham's. The two cousins had been raised together and shared a close relationship. (Note: In the opinion of author Antonia Fraser, this closeness, and Catesby's domineering of his older cousin, proved crucial to Tresham joining the conspiracy.)

Despite their shared upbringing and involvement in the Spanish Treason, the conspirators chose not to reveal the plot to him until 14 October 1605, shortly after his father died, and just weeks before the planned explosion. According to his confession, the meeting took place at the home of Tresham's brother-in-law, Lord Stourton, in Clerkenwell. Tresham claimed to have questioned Catesby on the morality of the plot, asking if it was spiritually "damnable". Catesby replied that it was not, at which point Tresham highlighted the danger that all Catholics would face should the plot succeed. Catesby replied, "The necessity of the Catholics" was such that "it must needs be done". He wanted two things from Tresham: £2,000, and the use of Rushton Hall; Catesby received neither. Tresham had no money to spare, his father's debts having reduced his inheritance, although he paid a small sum (Note: The sources used differ on the exact amount. Nicholls' claims it was "more than £190", while Fraser claims it was £100.) to Thomas Wintour, on the understanding that the latter was to travel to the Low Countries. Following the meeting, he hurried back to Rushton Hall and closed his household, taking care to hide family papers (not discovered until 1838). He then returned to London with his mother and sisters, and on 2 November acquired a licence to travel abroad with his servants and horses.

== Monteagle letter ==
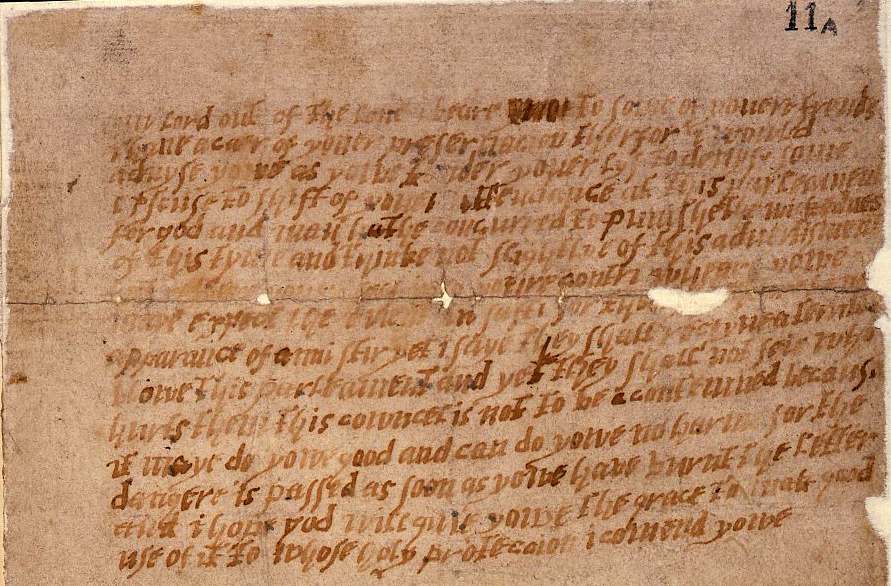
An anonymous letter sent to William Parker, 4th Baron Monteagle, was instrumental in revealing the existence of the plot. The identity of its author has never been reliably established.

Later in October, during a meeting at which Tresham was present, the conspirators discussed the fates of several notable Catholic peers. Foremost in Tresham's thoughts were the lives of two brothers-in-law, Lord Monteagle, and Lord Stourton, but Catesby proclaimed that "the innocent must perish with the guilty, sooner than ruin the chances of success." As the last few details were being finalised that month, on Saturday 26 October Monteagle received an anonymous letter while at his house in Hoxton. It contained the following message:

My Lord, out of the love I bear to some of your friends, I have a care of your preservation. Therefore I would advise you, as you tender your life, to devise some excuse to shift your attendance at this parliament; for God and man hath concurred to punish the wickedness of this time. And think not slightly of this advertisement, but retire yourself into your country where you may expect the event in safety. For though there be no appearance of any stir, yet I say they shall receive a terrible blow this Parliament; and yet they shall not see who hurts them. This counsel is not to be condemned because it may do you good and can do you no harm; for the danger is passed as soon as you have burnt the letter. And I hope God will give you the grace to make good use of it, to whose holy protection I commend you.

Uncertain of its meaning, Monteagle delivered it to the English Secretary of State, Robert Cecil.

Tresham has long been suspected as the letter's author. Mark Nicholls states that he almost certainly wrote it, pointing to the fact that once Catesby was made aware of its existence he immediately suspected Tresham and went with Thomas Wintour to confront him. The two threatened to "hang him", but "with such oaths and emphatic assertions" Tresham managed to convince the pair of his innocence, the next day urging them by letter to abandon the plot. Antonia Fraser suggests that Catesby and Wintour's decision to believe him should not be disregarded. While making his deathbed confession in the Tower of London, Tresham failed to mention the letter; an omission which in her opinion makes no sense if he is to be regarded as its author, especially considering that its recipient was by then being credited as the country's saviour. Author Alan Haynes views Tresham as the most likely culprit, but raises the possibility that Cecil penned the letter himself, to protect a source.

== Revealed ==
Although he was already aware of certain stirrings even before he received the letter, Cecil did not yet know the exact nature of the plot or who was involved and had elected to watch to see what would happen. When Monteagle's letter was shown to the king on Friday 1 November, James felt that it hinted at "some stratagem of fire and powder", perhaps an explosion exceeding in violence the one that killed his father, Lord Darnley, in 1567. The following day, members of the Privy Council visited James to inform him that a search would be made of the Houses of Parliament, "both above and below". Meanwhile, Tresham again urged Catesby and Wintour to abandon the scheme, but his attempts were in vain. Fellow plotter Thomas Percy said he was ready to "abide the uttermost trial", and subsequently on 4 November Catesby and several others left London for the Midlands to prepare for the planned uprising.

Fawkes was arrested while guarding the explosives shortly after midnight on 5 November 1605. Calling himself John Johnson, he was at first interrogated by members of the King's Privy Chamber, but on 6 November James ordered that "John Johnson" be tortured. His will finally broken, he revealed his true identity on 7 November, and on 8 November he began to name some of those with whom he was associated. Tresham's complicity was not revealed until the following day, although he was attributed with only a minor role. However, while his compatriots had fled London the moment they discovered that Fawkes had been captured, Tresham had stayed in the city. He was arrested on 12 November and transferred to the Tower three days later. Catesby and several other plotters were killed on 8 November, during an armed siege at Holbeche House in Staffordshire.

== Death ==
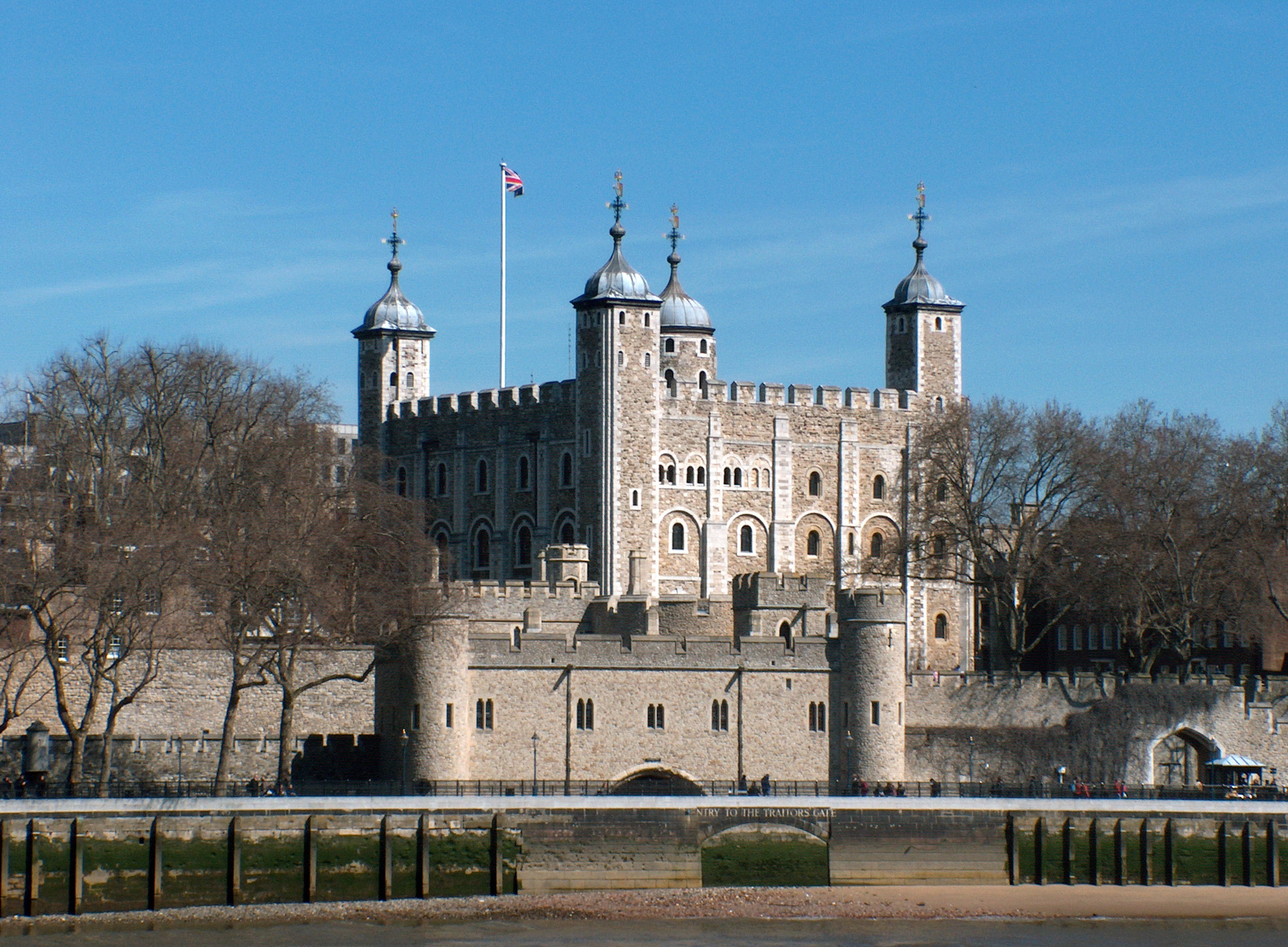
Tresham died in the Tower of London from natural causes.

Although at first he was uncooperative, on 13 November Tresham confessed to being involved in the plot, outlining his version of events to his interrogators. Moving his family from the safety of Rushton was, he pointed out, not the action of a man who believed he was taking them into "the very mouth and fury" of the plot. He admitted to the government that he was guilty only of the plot's concealment, denying that he had ever been an active member of the conspiracy, although by the end of the month he had also admitted his involvement in the Spanish Treason of 1602–1603. He claimed to have persuaded Thomas Wintour and Thomas Percy to postpone the explosion, and that he had planned to inform the king's secretary Thomas Lake of a "Puritan conspiracy". Fraser views much of his confession as "highly partial ... not only for his own sake but for that of his wife and children", and important in serving to highlight his unreliability.

Tresham suffered from a strangury caused by an inflammation of his urinary tract, and in December 1605 his health began to decline. Lieutenant of the Tower William Waad, wondering if Tresham would live long enough for justice to take its course, described his condition as "worse and worse". Tresham preferred the services of a Dr Richard Foster over those of the Tower's regular doctor Matthew Gwinne; apparently Foster understood his case, indicating that it was not the first occasion on which he had treated him. During his last days, he was attended by three more doctors and a nurse, along with William Vavasour, a rumoured illegitimate child of Thomas Tresham and possibly Francis's half-brother. As Tresham's wife, Anne, was apparently too upset, Vavasour wrote Tresham's deathbed confession and also an account of his last hours. Tresham apologised to the Jesuit priest Henry Garnet for implicating him in the Spanish Treason, and used the rest of his deathbed confession to protest his innocence. Anne and William read prayers at his bedside; he died at 2:00 am on 23 December. Despite not being tried, his head joined those of Catesby and Percy on display at Northampton, while his body was thrown into a hole at Tower Hill. His estates passed to his brother Lewis. Tresham's apology never reached its intended target, and his letter, along with the discovery of Garnet's Of Equivocation, found among the "heretical, treasonable and damnable books" at Tresham's chamber in the Inner Temple, was used to great effect by Sir Edward Coke in Garnet's trial. The priest was executed in May 1606.
