= Richard Knightley (disambiguation) =

Richard Knightley (1533–1615) was an English Puritan Member of Parliament (MP) in the 1580s.

Richard Knightley may also refer to:

- Richard Knightley (MP died 1442), MP for Northamptonshire
- Richard Knightley (MP died 1558), MP for Northamptonshire
- Richard Knightley (died 1639) (1593–1639), MP opposed to Charles I in the 1620s
- Richard Knightley (1617–1661), great-nephew of the first, MP and member of the council that arranged the Restoration
