= Thomas Mowbray, 1st Duke of Norfolk =

English peer (1366–1399)

His Grace The Duke of Norfolk
- Born: 22 March 1366; Epworth, Lincolnshire, England.
- Died: 22 September 1399 (aged 33); Venice, Republic of Venice, Italy.
- Buried: Venice, Italy.
- Noble family: House of Mowbray
- Spouses: Elizabeth le Strange; Lady Elizabeth FitzAlan
- Issue: Thomas de Mowbray, 4th Earl of Norfolk; John de Mowbray, 2nd Duke of Norfolk; Elizabeth de Mowbray, Countess of Suffolk; Isabel de Mowbray, Baroness Berkeley; Margaret de Mowbray, Lady Howard
- Father: John de Mowbray, 4th Baron Mowbray
- Mother: Elizabeth de Segrave

Arms of Thomas de Mowbray, 1st Duke of Norfolk

Thomas Mowbray, 1st Duke of Norfolk, KG (22 March 1366 – 22 September 1399) was an English landowner and peer. His family was a venerable one, and by the time Thomas reached adulthood, they were extremely influential in national politics. He claimed a direct bloodline from King Edward I. His father died when Thomas and his elder brother John were young. John soon died, and Thomas inherited the Earldom of Nottingham. He had probably been friends with the king, Richard II, since he was young, and as a result, he was a royal favourite, a role he greatly profited from. He accompanied Richard on his travels around the kingdom and was elected to the Order of the Garter. Richard's lavish dispersal of his patronage made him unpopular with parliament and other members of the English nobility, and Mowbray fell out badly with the king's uncle, John of Gaunt.

Mowbray journeyed into Scotland with the king when he invaded in 1385, although it is possible that their friendship was waning at this point. Richard had a new favourite, Robert de Vere; Mowbray, meanwhile, became increasingly close to Richard Fitzalan, Earl of Arundel, whose daughter Elizabeth he married. The king already distrusted Arundel and Mowbray's new circle included the equally estranged Thomas of Woodstock, Duke of Gloucester. Together they plotted against the king's chancellor, the Earl of Suffolk, appealing him in parliament. Suffolk was impeached, and a council was appointed to oversee the king. Mowbray gradually became disillusioned with his comrades, perhaps because of the brutal revenges they took and by 1389, he was back in the king's favour. Mowbray entered into jousts, led embassies and joined Richard on his 1395 invasion of Ireland, negotiating successfully with the Irish Kings. By now, the king felt sufficiently restored to power to attack his enemies, which seems to have culminated in Mowbray's killing of Gloucester in Calais in 1397 on Richard's orders. Probably in a quid pro quo, Mowbray was made Duke of Norfolk soon after.

In the meantime, Mowbray had fallen out with John of Gaunt's eldest son, Henry Bolingbroke, and they arranged a trial by combat. No sooner had this begun than the king cancelled it in person. He exiled them both: Mowbray for life, Bolingbroke for ten years. Mowbray took a vow of pilgrimage, intending to travel to Jerusalem. He reached Venice, but in September 1399, he died before leaving it. By his wife Elizabeth, he left two sons and three daughters. The eldest son, Thomas, inherited his father's earldom of Norfolk, rebelled against the king in 1405 and was beheaded for treason. Mowbray's second son, also John, inherited the dukedom and served the crown faithfully.

== Background and youth ==
The Mowbrays were an old baronial family, having been first ennobled in 1295. By the 14th century, advantageous marriages, service to the crown and its rewards gave them great political standing. Thomas Mowbray was the son of John, Lord Mowbray and his wife Elizabeth Segrave, the daughter and heiress of John, Lord Segrave by his wife Margaret, Duchess of Norfolk. Margaret in turn was daughter and heiress of Thomas of Brotherton, Earl of Norfolk, the fifth son of King Edward I.

Thomas Mowbray was born in 1366; the precise date is unknown. (Note: Historian Chris Given-Wilson argues that, while 22 March is commonly accepted, this is probably too early, as his brother was born the previous August.) He was probably named after the cult of St Thomas Becket, which his mother followed. Thomas's elder brother John was their father's heir. Lord Mowbray died in 1368. Four years later, the brothers became the ward of their great-aunt, Blanche of Lancaster. John—a "special friend" to the king, suggest Enoch Powell and Keith Wallis— was created Earl of Nottingham on the coronation of King Richard II in 1377 but died in early 1383. Almost immediately—within a few days—the earldom was re-granted to Thomas, and even though he was still legally a minor, he was allowed seisin of his patrimony.

As a second son, little was recorded of Mowbray's youth, although his background and status ensured him a position at court. The King and Mowbray had probably been childhood friends and he was a royal favourite from around 1382. That year he was granted hunting rights in certain royal forests and was knighted. It was around this time that John of Gaunt's son Henry Bolingbroke began falling out of favour with the King. Mowbray supplanted him in the king's favour. In 1383, he married ten-year-old Lady Elizabeth Lestrange, heiress of John, Lord Blakemere, although she died not long after the wedding.

== Political background ==
Richard II was only ten when he succeeded his grandfather's, Edward III's, throne in 1377. Although the appearance was maintained that he personally reigned, a continual council was organised to manage government business for him. This government, originally popular, faced increasing criticism following the suppression of the Peasants' Revolt in 1381. King Richard was reproved for his patronage of a few select royal favourites, to an extent that has been described as "lavish to the point of foolishness" by a biographer, historian Anthony Tuck. Parliament also believed that the King should rule as economically as possible, and they observed with displeasure the King's distribution of extravagant wealth to a limited circle. The greatest recipient was Michael de la Pole, Earl of Suffolk. Abroad, the Hundred Years' War was going poorly for England. Several expeditions had left for France in the early years of the reign to defend English French territory, but they were almost all military and political failures. (Note: For example, the Bishop of Norwich's 1383 expedition to Bruge which was widely criticised at the time.)

== Career to 1390 ==
Mowbray remained high in royal favour following the death of his wife, and he was elected to the Order of the Garter in October 1383, despite his military inexperience. The King granted him grace and favour rooms at the royal palaces of Eltham and Kings Langley. As an important courtier, Mowbray accompanied Richard on his tour of East Anglia in 1383. His closeness to the King drew the opprobrium of his uncle, John of Gaunt, Duke of Lancaster—the most powerful man in the Kingdom after the King. Gaunt accused Mowbray, along with Robert, Earl of Oxford and William, Earl of Salisbury of plotting against Richard. Gaunt had fallen out of favour with his nephew and had withdrawn from the council. In retaliation for his accusations, says the chronicler Thomas Walsingham, Mowbray, de Vere and Montacute plotted to kill the duke in February 1385. The King held jousts between 13 and 14 February and Gaunt's murder was to be committed on the 14th; it is possible that Richard did not disapprove, such had relations between him and his uncle broken down over military policy. Gaunt told Richard that he viewed the King's advisors as "unsavoury"; Mowbray and his colleagues lodged a series of further accusations against the duke. Gaunt received a warning of the attack at the joust and fled on the night of 14 February.

Remisit etiam dux Lancastrim ad rogatum domini regis iracundiam suam quam erga quosdam dominos regi familiares gerebat. Et fuerunt hi comes Sarum, comes Oxoniae, comes Notyngham aliique fuerunt qui nondum potuerunt abse protunc remissionis gratiam obtinere.

The duke of Lancaster also informed the lord the king of the wrath which he bore towards certain regi familiare around the king. He named the Earl of Salisbury, the Earl of Oxford, the Earl of Nottingham, and others whom he was not yet able to forgive at that time

— Johannes Malverne's Polychronicon

(Note: Historian W. L. Warren described the medieval concept of regi familiare as those comprising "an intimate, a familiar resident or visitor in the [royal] household, a member of the familia, that wider family which embraces servants, confidants, and close associates" around the King. The position was not necessarily a sinecure, as these men were often used to perform administrative or household duties.)

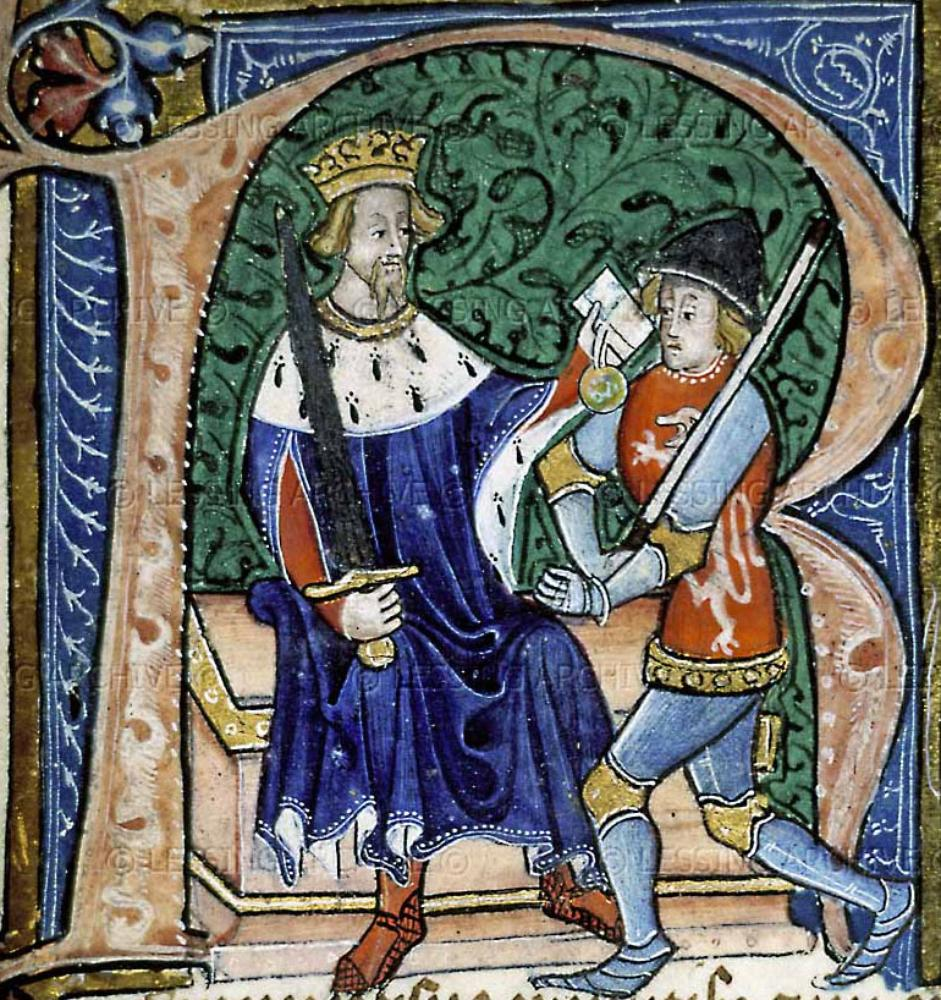
Richard II appoints Mowbray Earl Marshal, from a c. 1390 illuminated manuscript.

On 30 June 1385—as the royal army was about to leave for Scotland—Mowbray received his great-grandfather's office of Marshal of England. (Note: Cockayne gives the year 1385 for when Mowbray was created Earl Marshal. Horace Round, notes that he was granted the office of Marshal of England in 1385 but only formally received the title of Earl Marshal, and its entailment in his male line, in 1386. The reason for transferring the office from Holland was officially given as being due to 'certain urgent causes', but may have been in retaliation for Holland's younger brother's involvement in the recent murder of Ralph Stafford, a close companion of King Richard.) He led a force of 99 men-at-arms and 150 archers, serving with Gaunt in the vanguard. Mowbray helped draw up the King's ordinances for the campaign at Durham, (Note: These ordinances still survive at the British Library, catalogued as MS Cotton Nero D. VI. 89r—90r.) although by now, suggests Given-Wilson, Mowbray's relations with Richard were cooling.

Less than a year after his first wife's death, Mowbray married Elizabeth Fitzalan. Elizabeth was a daughter of Richard, Earl of Arundel, and, although the King attended their wedding and the week-long festivities accompanying it, it is unlikely that the marriage was popular with Richard. (Note: Arundel had also previously been a favourite of Richard's, receiving much patronage as a result of the support he had shown the King during the Peasants' revolt. He basked in royal favour, and Richard stood godfather to Fitzalan's son. However—possibly also in a foreign policy disagreement or concerns over royal expenditure—Arundel began to lose influence at court in favour of Oxford and de la Pole.) His second marriage must have been a turning point. Richard doubtless saw Arundel as a negative influence on Mowbray and feared the strengthening of the earl's position against him. Mowbray and Elizabeth had also wed without his permission, so the King distrained Mowbray's estates until he had received the value of the license. Tuck argues that "nor was the king's concern unfounded"; Mowbray had been increasingly isolated at court by the King's latest favourites, such as Oxford, and had moved into the circle of those who opposed the new royal intimates, perhaps seeing them as the best way to dispose of his rival. This circle also included not only Richard's father-in-law but his uncle, Thomas, Duke of Gloucester. In a sign that Mowbray was not completely out of favour, Elizabeth received her robes as a Lady of the Garter in 1386.

Both men had played an important role in parliament's attack on Richard's chancellor, Michael de la Pole, Earl of Suffolk at the Wonderful Parliament of 1386. (Note: At one point in the parliament, for example, the King retired to Eltham Palace and refused to return, thus effectively hamstringing parliament. In response, the lords and commons sent Arundel and Gloucester to Richard and persuade him to return. They achieved this by threatening him with the same deposition his predecessor, Edward II had faced. In this case, though, their evidence consisted of imaginary statutes and "outrageous remarks".) The Wonderful Parliament had taken place against a backdrop of genuine fear of a French invasion—Walsingham described how Londoners, in his view, like "timid mice they scurried hither and thither—and Arundel had been appointed Admiral of England. In March the following year he, in turn, appointed Mowbray his deputy, and they took a fleet out of Margate and encountered a French-Flemish fleet almost immediately. The result was its crushing defeat. Between 50 and 100 French-Flemish ships were captured or destroyed. (Note: Although historians debated whether the French had gained control effective control of the channel following the English naval defeat at La Rochelle in 1372, raids on southern ports were frequent, and "given that just six months earlier England had been in real danger of being invaded for the first time in nearly two centuries, this was no mean achievement". They also captured 4000 tuns of wine which they sold off cheaply in England, increasing their general popularity.) The King was unimpressed. When Arundel and Mowbray returned to court, Richard claimed they had only defeated merchants, and Oxford turned his back on the earls. It was, however, an extremely popular victory with the people.

=== Appellant ===
For most of the 1380s, Mowbray received what he doubtless considered his due from the King in lands, offices and grants. But by 1387, he became increasingly estranged from Richard's court. The main reason for this was probably jealousy of de Vere. While he was wealthy enough not to rely on royal favour, as de Vere did, he expected the honour and dignity that his birth and status demanded. This he saw increasingly syphoned off to his rival. Although the Wonderful Parliament had set up a commission to effectively restrain the King, it turned out to be ineffective. Richard emasculated the commission by leaving London immediately, ignoring its deliberations, and holding his own councils in the provinces. He also took legal advice from his judges who, unsurprisingly, found in his favour that those responsible for parliament's treatment of the King should be deemed traitors. In response, Mowbray joined Bolingbroke, Gloucester, Arundel and Warwick in appealing several of the King's friends, including Oxford, of treason, and raised an army at Hornsey, north of London. The Appellants' army engaged Oxford's at the Battle of Radcot Bridge, inflicting a crushing defeat on the royalists in December. Mowbray did not take part, as he was guarding the road back to the West Midlands at Moreton in Marsh, although he may have sent a portion of his retinue to the Appellant army.

Mowbray appears responsible for dissuading Gloucester, Arundel and Warwick from marching to London and deposing the King. Indeed, he and Bolingbroke may have been a moderating influence on the others. Conversely, due to his position as Earl Marshal—one of the two heads of the Court of Chivalry—his presence with the Appellants enabled them to frame their offensive juridically rather than as a traditional noble rebellion. Mowbray was amongst the Appellants that attended Richard in the Tower of London—with arms linked— on 30 December 1387 and accused the King of treachery towards them. They also demanded Richard order the arrest of the appellees; Walsingham reports that he only agreed to do so on being threatened, once again, with deposition. The King attempted to divide Mowbray from his colleagues, asking him to stay behind when the others were ready to leave. With the King now under their control, Mowbray and the Appellants called parliament for early 1388. This session became known as the Merciless Parliament on account of the vengeance it laid on the King's closest supporters, (Note: The Appellants could not directly attack Richard, but his inner circle were condemned almost unopposed, albeit that many of the charges—such as conspiring to surrender English lands in France to the French and embezzling public funds—were almost certainly groundless. The contemporary, Thomas Favent records how Michael de la Pole, Earl of Suffolk; the Mayor of London, Nicholas Brembre; Robert de Vere; the Archbishop of York, Alexander Neville; and the Chief Justice, Robert Tresilian, were condemned for "living in vice, deluding the said king... embracing the mammon of iniquity for themselves". None were given formal trials. Neville was a bishop and was spared execution, but all his assets were seized, and he was exiled. The rest were ordered drawn and hanged,) with Mowbray overseeing the executions with "the aid and authority of the mayor, sheriffs, and aldermen of London". Mowbray was to take the condemned to the Tower and "'from there drag him through the city of London as far as the gallows at Tyburn, and there hang him by the neck".

=== Rapprochment with the King ===
For his part, there are signs that Mowbray was becoming dissatisfied with his comrades through the course of the parliament, which Tuck suggests was because Mowbray was "never as committed to the destruction of the court faction as Gloucester, Arundel, and Warwick". Given-Wilson suggests that the inclusion of Mowbray by the Appellants broadened their base among the nobility (from his having had less acrimonious relations with the King), but also weakened them as a body by diluting their grievances. As indicated by Mowbray's dispute with Warwick over the Gower lordship, they were already "shot through with personal and political differences" as it was. Tuck suggests that, while Mowbray seems able to have stomached the convictions of the others, "the real rift occurred over the question of Sir Simon Burley's fate". Gloucester and Warwick accused him of exercising undue influence over Richard; Burley, the under-chamberlain, had been tutor to the King, who wanted to save him. Mowbray and Bolingbroke agreed, but to no avail, and in May 1388 Burley was hanged at Tyburn.

Mowbray was loyal to the King and court. Early indications of Mowbray's return to favour came in early 1389 when he had his estates restored to him and was pardoned for having married without the King's licence. In March, he was appointed warden of the East March and castellan of Berwick Castle, receiving wages of £6,000 in peacetime and twice that in time of war. His appointment was not a success; he alienated the traditional lord of the north, Henry Percy, Earl of Northumberland, who retired to court. Mowbray held no lands in the north and had few contacts among the gentry, upon whom he needed to rely to raise his army. Mowbray's tenure in the East March was effectively disabled from the start; Mowbray's ineffectiveness to highlighted in June that year, when a Scottish incursion ravaged the north of England and, facing little opposition, went as far south as Tynemouth. Mowbray, the Westminster Chronicle reports, refused the Scottish offer of a pitched battle and retreated to Berwick Castle.

The King regained sole control of government around in May 1389, and Mowbray attended a royal council meeting in Clarendon Palace that September, demonstrating the gulf that existed by then between him and his ex-comrades. At another meeting the following month, the King attempted to increase Mowbray's remuneration in March. The council, headed by William of Wykeham as chancellor, refused—"in the name and by the will of all the other lords of the council"—and Richard was forced to acquiesce, albeit vultu quodammodo indignanti, or "with an angry expression". Henry Percy had been recompensed for the loss of the wardenship with the captaincy of Calais; in 1391, he and Mowbray exchanged offices, returning Percy to the March and sending Mowbray to France.

=== Martial service ===
[MacMurrough granted] to our Lord the king ... full possession of all lands, tenements, castles, fortresses, woods, and pastures, with all their appurtenances, which have been of late occupied by the said Art or his allies, men, or adherents within the land of Leinster ... that by the first Sunday of Lent next, he will leave the whole country of Leinster to the true obedience, use, and disposition of the king, his heirs, and successors ... saving and excepting always to him all his moveable goods ... and that all the armed men, warriors, or fighting men of the following, household, or nation of the said Art shall quit the whole lands of Leinster aforesaid and shall go with him and shall have fitting wages from the king, for the time being, to go and conquer other parts occupied by rebels of the said Lord King, and that Art and all his men aforesaid shall have all lands which they may thus acquire and hold them of the said Lord King.

— Instruments Touching upon Ireland, 1394–1395

As a result of Mowbray's return to the court party, his undertaking of royal service for the King increased. He jousted before Richard's chamberlain at St Inglevert, near Boulogne, in April 1390, where he proved himself a champion against the French, who the well-regarded knight led, Jean de Boucicaut. (Note: Bolingbroke, one of his co-jousters was probably the most renowned in England; historian Ian Mortimer suggests that Mowbray was "hardly any less a jousting champion" than him. The French chronicler, Michel Pintoin, a monk at Saint-Denis, said they "were recognized as bravest of all the foreigners".) Mowbray led a group of up to 60 English knights and esquires. The following month another joust was held at Smithfield, outside London. Mowbray's presence in the King's party was a part of Richard's policy of reconciling the appellants to his personal rule and, by extension, furthering his own power. Here, before the King, Mowbray defeated John Dunbar, Earl of Moray—who later died, says one chronicler, of his wounds—after six jousts with an unrebated lance. (Note: A rebated lance had had its spearhead removed and placed with something blunt and wooden, often a small crown that would dig into a shield without piercing it. These lances were usually hollow to allow them to shatter on impact. They came into being in the 12th century, suggests, Ewart Oakeshott, in "a slight concession" top participants' safety".) Froissart wrote how, at Smithfield "everyone exerted himself to the utmost to excel: many were unhorsed and more lost their helmets".

Mowbray joined the King on his campaign to Ireland in 1394. Richard's strategy was to plant his nobility across the country in direct confrontation with Gaelic kings to force them into submission. Mowbray occupied Carlow, of which he was granted the lordship. (Note: The liberty and lordship had also been held by his grandfather, Brotherton.) Mowbray led several raids against the King of Leinster, Art Macmurrough, and a royal letter to the council reported how he "had several fine encounters with the Irish". Mowbray burned nine villages, killing many, and captured around 8,000 head of cattle. On one occasion, he nearly captured MacMurrough "and his wife in their beds". (Note: Mowbray captured the Irish King's great seal as well as a chest, but this belonged to his wife Elizabeth as it contained "certain articles of feminine use, but of no great value".) MacMurrough's escape left Mowbray "sorely vexed", and in revenge he had the house razed, as well as 14 surrounding villages. He then marched through the Blackstairs Mountains "which was all bog... no Englishman has commonly entered before". A number of enemies were captured. Their leader was executed, and his head sent to Richard.

Mowbray eventually secured MacMurrough's indenture of submission to Richard. During these negotiations, Mowbray possessed full in locum regis powers, and persuaded Macmurrough to evacuate Leinster for the English. His sub-chieftains followed. In the event neither macMurrough nor his armies left Leinster, and Mowbray was in no position to force them. His attempts to install English lordship in the province came to nothing; he returned to England in May 1395. (Note: However lacklustre the end of Richard's campaign, at least one historian has highlighted Mowbray's value to the King during it.)

== Royal service to 1398 ==
On his return, Mowbray almost immediately became involved, with his comrades-in-arms from the Irish campaign Lord Scrope and the Earl of Rutland, in the negotiations over Richard's proposed marriage to Isabella, daughter of the French King, Charles VI. Mowbray made many trips to France, finally concluding negotiations in March 1396. The betrothal was made official in September, and Mowbray escorted the French King to Calais. Richard also deputised Mowbray to conduct secret negotiations with Philip, Duke of Burgundy and John, Duke of Berry. Given-Wilson suggests that the King "had considerable faith in Mowbray's diplomatic ability" since in May the next year, Mowbray represented England at the Imperial Diet in Frankfurt. This had been called to end the latest Papal Schism by forcing the resignation of the two partisan popes. Richard's faith in Mowbray is reflected in the numerous grants the earl received in this period. Tuck suggests that Mowbray could afford to spend an estimated 40% of his total income just on wages to retainers, suggesting his affinity was substantial enough to match that of most earls.

In 1397, at Warwick's expense, Mowbray received the lordship of Gower, which their two families had been quarrelling for possession of for most of the preceding century. Saul suggests that Mowbray relied on his friendship with the King to retrieve the grant, which had been in Beauchamp's hands since 1354. This was "doubly disastrous" for Warwick, comments Saul; not only was it the richest lordship he possessed—thus having a major impact on his income—but he was ordered to repay Mowbray the profits he had earned since 1361, amounting to around £5333 per annum. The atmosphere at court was tense. Richard may have felt threatened, suspecting that the Appellants would launch another attack; this may have persuaded him to get in first. In early July, the King settled all family accounts with the Appellants. He invited Arundel, Gloucester and Warwick to a feast—of Herodian infamy, reported Walsingham—at which they would be arrested. Only Warwick attended. Arundel and Gloucester were apprehended later. They were tried individually and convicted of treason in September. Warwick forfeit his titles and estates and was sentenced to life imprisonment. Arundel was beheaded; Mowbray, as Earl marshal, oversaw the sentence of his erstwhile comrade. Gloucester was exiled to Calais. It was probably Mowbray's attempts to save Simon Burley's life years before that saved Mowbray's in 1397.

=== Murder of Gloucester and elevation ===
Richard, by the grace of God, king of England and France, and lord of Ireland, to his beloved kinsman Thomas earl marshal, captain of our town of Calais, and his lieutenant there, greeting. Whereas our beloved brother Edward earl of Rutland, our beloved kinsman Thomas earl of Kent, our beloved brother John earl of Huntingdon, our beloved kinsmen Thomas earl of Nottingham, John earl of Somerset, John earl of Salisbury, and Thomas lord Despenser, and our beloved and faithful William Scrope our chamberlain, have before us in our present parliament accused Thomas duke of Gloucester, amongst others, he being in our prison in your keeping upon our orders, of divers treasons committed and perpetrated by him and others against us, our estate, crown, and dignity, and the appellants offered their aforesaid appeal in our said parliament to be prosecuted according to the law and custom practised in our kingdom of England, humbly praying us, that we might be willing to order the duke to appear in person before us in our same parliament to answer upon his aforesaid appeal; we, agreeing to the aforesaid prayer, do order you, firmly enjoining you to cause the aforementioned duke to come safely and securely before us and our council in our aforesaid parliament, with all the haste you can, to answer the aforesaid appellants upon their said appeal, according to the law and custom aforesaid; and also to do and receive what shall happen to be ordained by us and our said council in our same parliament. And do not omit to do so in any way. And have this writ there. Witnessed myself at Westminster on 21 September, in the twenty-first year of our reign.

— Writ of Richard II to Thomas Mowbray, recorded in the Parliament Rolls of Medieval England, September 1397.

Gloucester had been covertly arrested on the night of 10–11 July 1397, and "bundled out of England to Calais". It was popularly speculated that the King personally ordered Gloucester's assassination, and it was later alleged—in the 1399 parliament—that Mowbray was likely instrumental, in his role of Captain of Calais. Rumours of Gloucester's death had been circulating since August, and Given-Wilson speculates that this may be a sign that Richard had ordered Mowbray to kill the duke then, but that the latter hesitated several weeks. Richard ordered William Rickhill, Justice of the King's Bench, to Calais, "in the company of our dearest kinsman Thomas, earl marshal and earl of Nottingham ... and there that you do and perform each and everything which is enjoined on you by the aforesaid earl on our behalf". In the event they travelled separately. Rickhill left England on 7 September and was to receive Mowbray's instructions when they arrived. The writs he had, notes McVitty, "were deliberately left undated or were post-dated to fit a falsified timeline". When they met, Mowbray's instructions were that Rickhill was to have a "colloqium ... clearly and openly certified under his seal". Gloucester made his confession, in the presence of witnesses, on 8 September. The following day, when Rickhill requested another meeting with the Duke, Mowbray refused him. A few days later, parliament requested Mowbray to bring Gloucester back to England to have him stand trial before it. Mowbray returned the writ of summons with the bald reply that he was unable to do so because the duke was dead: "I held this duke in my custody in the lord king's prison in the town of Calais, and there, in that same prison, he died". (Note: Mowbray's response to the King, as recorded in the PROME was not much fuller. He wrote I am unable to cause Thomas duke of Gloucester named in the writ sent to me to come before you and your council in the present parliament, to do as the writ demands and requires, because the same duke is dead. And the same duke, by order of my most excellent lord the lord king, I had in my keeping in the prison of the lord king in the town of Calais: and he died there in the same.) The historian Amanda McVitty suggests that "historians generally agree that by this point, Richard must have known that Gloucester was already dead".

On 29 September 1397, Mowbray received a royal pardon for his role as an Appellant. This was part of Richard's re-establishment of his aristocracy known as the Duketti: "dukelings" or "little dukes". (Note: These comprised four dukes, mostly close relatives: his half-brother John Holland, Earl of Huntingdon, became Duke of Exeter; his nephew Thomas Holland, Earl of Kent, became Duke of Surrey; and cousins Edward, Earl of Rutland and Bolingbroke became respectively Dukes of Aumale and Hereford.) Given-Wilson has suggested that Mowbray's new title "cheapened the great titles at the crown's disposal", while Rowena Archer has argued that, although he may not have been related to the King by blood, "he had lineage and wealth to merit so high an honour". He also suggests that this does not necessarily indicate the true relationship between the two men. As an (albeit ex) appellant, Richard must have found it difficult to forget Mowbray's earlier treason, irrespective of his subsequent loyalty. For Mowbray's part, he was too experienced a political operator at the court not to realise this. To celebrate their return to the King's grace, Bolingbroke and Mowbray held a ceremonial requiem mass and feast, last which the King and Queen attended. Ostensibly this was to commemorate the return from the Holy Land of Mowbray's father's bones for reinterment; John Mowbray had built up a posthumous reputation as vir catholicus and something of a cult surrounded him. John Mowbray's bones were reliquaried at a Carmelite church, a display that was clearly intended to reflect personally on Mowbray also, increasing his political stature just as he had been elevated to the highest title in the land.

=== Quarrel with Bolingbroke ===
By late 1397, Richard was planning another expedition to Ireland, while in another repercussion from the Revenge Parliament, around the same time Mowbray quarrelled with Bolingbroke, now Duke of Hereford. Not only did this seriously disrupt the King's plans, but says Saul, it was also the event that "brought the royal house of cards come tumbling down". The historian Caroline Barron argues that "a certain amount of inter-aristocratic rivalry could work to the king's advantage, but it was a dangerous game to play", and this one was to be fatal to Richard. The causes behind their dispute are no longer obvious, but Saul suggests that although a "tangled story", Given-Wilson's explanation is probably as accurate as can now be discerned. He suggests that the issue was less with the personalities involved and more with broader disagreements regarding royal policy, which the King could not contain. The narrative of events only survives through Bolinbroke's later retelling. (Note: Given-Wilson notes that, in his description of what both Mowbray and he said in their exchange, Bolingbroke's "first consideration was to ensure that nothing he said would be self-incriminating".) They had both been pardoned in December 1397 in the final session of the previous parliament.

According to Bolingbroke, he met Mowbray on the London–Brentford road while on their way to the Shrewsbury parliament, Mowbray telling him that the king was planning on having them both arrested and that the royal pardons they had received were valueless; Richard intended to "annul that record". Bolingbroke said he protested that the King would not commit such a breach of faith, to which Mowbray supposedly reminded him that Warwick, Arundel and Gloucester had also had pardons. The King, in turn, was backing their enemies at court, especially Roger Mortimer, Earl of March, the Duke of Surrey and the Earls of Wiltshire, Salisbury and Gloucester. Mowbray apparently urged Bolingbroke to turn against Surrey, Wiltshire and Gloucester, arguing that "even if they are unable to achieve their purpose at present, they will be intent on destroying us in our homes ten years hence". Mowbray was probably more concerned for his safety than Bolingbroke, as the latter had the support of John of Gaunt behind him, and Mowbray did not.

The King heard of their encounter and made Bolingbroke repeat Mowbray's "many dishonest and slanderous words" at the Shrewsbury sitting of parliament. On 3 January 1398, Bolingbroke presented the King with a deed—"to the best of his memory"—of accusation. Mowbray was furious and denied everything. Parliament could not establish the rights or wrongs of the affair, and Richard set up a committee to resolve it. Believing that Bolingbroke was doing his father's bidding, Mowbray laid an ambush for Gaunt in early 1398, although the Duke escaped to Shrewsbury. Mowbray now panicked, says Given-Wilson, and fled. Thus, only Bolingbroke's narrative of events survives, as Mowbray did not hang around long enough to provide his own. The King reacted immediately. Mowbray forfeited his office of Earl Marshal, and an order went out for his arrest. Mowbray appeared before Richard at Oswestry in January 1398, having either surrendered or been arrested. Pending a full council hearing in April, he and Bolingbroke were imprisoned in Windsor Castle. Bolingbroke was promptly bailed by his father; Mowbray remained in prison. However, the lack of either supporting or disputing evidence for either party's claims made it a "he said, he said" situation, and as a result, Richard decided that it could only be settled with trial by combat, since both men refused to be reconciled. The day was set for 16 September 1398 in Coventry, with the delay being intended to allow cooler heads to prevail if possible. They did not, and the tourney took place as agreed. Both men were experienced and skilled jousters, and according to Adam of Usk,

On the day of battle they both came in great state to the appointed place, which was fenced with a wet ditch. But the duke of Hereford appeared far more gloriously distinguished with diverse pieces of equipment of seven horses. And, because the king had it by divination that the duke of Norfolk should then prevail, he rejoiced much, eagerly striving after the destruction of the duke of Hereford. But when they joined battle, it seemed to him that the duke of Hereford would prevail. (Note: The antiquarian, Edward Maunde Thompson notes that both men "made a great display of arms and trappings"; Mowbray's armour was German plate.)

At this point, the King intervened and stopped the combat. Usk avers this was because he saw that Mowbray was on the verge of losing, whereas the official chronicle says Richard was averse to two of his subjects injuring themselves or worse in the name of his justice. Another contemporary chronicler, the author of the Chronicque de la Traïson et Mort suggests that the fighting had hardly begun when the King stopped it. The scholar Amanda McVitty suggests that he saw the chance to rid himself of two ex-Appellants while appearing to be acting with chivalric magnanimity. Allington-Smith suggests that, perhaps, "it was not in his interest that either of them should win". Anne Curry has argued that, in his office of Earl Marshal, Mowbray would usually have organised such a duel himself. Historians, she proposes, have not made enough of the fact that this was not enough for Bolingbroke to restrain his attack.

== Exile and death ==
Instead of fighting, the two men were exiled: Mowbray for life, Bolingbroke for 10 years. Usk suggests that Mowbray would at some point be welcomed back, when "being minded he might restore him". Given-Wilson suggests that even at this stage, Richard had foreseen the possibility of confiscating the two men's estates. The longer sentence on Mowbray was supposedly because, while the charge of treason had not been proven, he had failed to renounce the appellants severely enough, had misgoverned Calais to the endangerment of the country and had plotted against John of Gaunt. Mowbray was given a choice by Richard. He could go on pilgrimage to Jerusalem, Germany, Bohemia or Hungary. This allowed Mowbray to save his honour. Anywhere else was prohibited upon pain of death. He was banned from communicating with Bolingbroke during the latter's exile. This sentence could not be appealed, nor could they request to return early, although he would receive £1000 per annum from his estates while abroad. His office of Earl Marshal was granted to Westmorland, while his heir was placed in the household of Richard's Queen as a page. Mowbray also set up a council to advise the young Thomas in his father's absence, which included some of his own experienced councillors such as Sir John St. John.

Mowbray sailed from Lowestoft to Dordrecht on 19 September 1398; over a thousand well-wishers saw him off from the quay. It was 2PM, and Mowbray was accompanied by around 30 people, including servants and retainers. A historian of the town has commented that, "If the authorities had chosen Lowestoft as the embarkation point in preference to Yarmouth because it was smaller and less well known, their hopes of keeping the event low-key seem not to have worked". Observers included eighty members of the Suffolk gentry, and they testified that, with a strong wind behind him—"bon vent et swerf" was recorded—he could easily make six league before sunset.

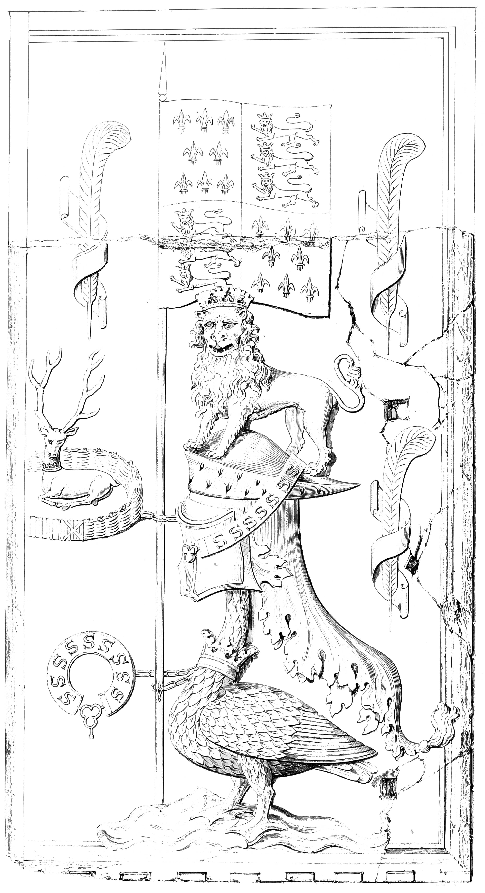
Possible funerary slab of Thomas Mowbray (d.1399) originally in St Mark's Cathedral, Venice and now held at Corby Castle, Cumbria. (Note: Discovered, drawn and first published by Rawdon Brown for the Antiquarian Society in 1842, recent scholarship has highlighted the possibility that it is, in fact, a monument erected to commemorate Henry IV's visit to Venice while Earl of Hertford, in 1392–1393.)

Margaret, Duchess of Norfolk, did not die until March 1399. Mowbray would not, though, inherit the great Brotherton estates. Even though he had been granted letters of protection after the Coventry judgement allowing him to sue for the right to enter any new inheritance, these were cancelled the same day Richard announced he would confiscate Bolingbroke's Lancastrian inheritance. This has been described by the scholar Douglas Biggs as an act of either "malice or great folly".

In Venice, he arranged to purchase a ship from the Signoria, during which negotiations he is recorded in the senate records as "Magnificent Lord the Duke of Gilforth", or Guildford. The antiquarian Mary Margaret Newett commented that "it is not clear why he took this title or how long he bore it", although there are a number of Venetian documents extant from a few years later that refer to him again as Duke of Norfolk.

Mowbray died of the plague in Venice on 22 September 1399. He was buried in St Mark's Cathedral with an unusual funerary slab. The imagery includes the royal arms of England (per his office of Earl Marshal), the lion crest of his family, the White Hart of Richard II and the White Swan of Henry IV—although the latter, comments the historian David Marcombe had "its head curiously concealed beneath Mowbray's helm". Had he died closer to home, he probably would have been buried in the family mausoleum at Axholme.

== Legacy and aftermath ==
Chris Given-Wilson has argued that Mowbray's feud with Bolingbroke led directly to the latter's usurpation of Richard's throne. Bolingbroke returned to England in early July 1399. He claimed that he had only returned to claim his Lancastrian inheritance, but with Richard in Ireland and facing no resistance as he marched south, and claimed the throne on 30 September. Shortly afterwards, on 6 October 1399, the creation of Mowbray as Duke of Norfolk was annulled by Parliament, although his heir retained his other titles.

Arms of Thomas de Mowbray as Earl Marshal, c. 1395

Mowbray's executors were granted £1000 for the fulfilment of his will, payment of debts and burial in Venice. In 1532 Mowbray's descendant, Thomas Howard, Duke of Norfolk requested the return of Mowbray's bones from Venice, intending them to be reinterred with his ducal descendants.

== Personality and assessment ==
Mowbray founded the Axholme Charterhouse in 1395 or 1396; he had been petitioning the papacy since at least 1389 for authority. (Note: The exact date is unknown, as part of the foundation charter is now missing. Due to Mowbray's role in the priory's origins, his arms was incorporated into its seal.) He bequeathed Axholme "a tun or two pipes Gascon wine" a year, along with other smaller donations to other houses. Also in 1396 he founded a Carthusian monastery at Epworth.

Contemporary chroniclers are near-universal in their condemnation of Mowbray, although those that have survived were all writing after Bolingbroke seized the throne. The historian Nigel Saul has described Mowbray as being "driven by ambition and lust for power" and fickle in character. Barron suggests he was "an erratic and insecure man", while Given-Wilson says that "impetuous and mercurial Mowbray may have been", but he was not without principles.

== Marriages and issue ==
Mowbray married first, after 20 February 1383, Elizabeth le Strange (c. 6 December 1373 – 23 August 1383), suo jure Lady Strange of Blackmere, daughter and heiress of John le Strange, 5th Baron Strange of Blackmere and Lady Isabel de Beauchamp, daughter of Thomas de Beauchamp, 11th Earl of Warwick. Lady Elizabeth was 9 years old at the time of her marriage and died within around 6 months of being married; as such the couple had no issue. Mowbray's second wife was Lady Elizabeth FitzAlan (c. 1372 – 8 July 1425), widow of Sir William Montagu, and daughter of Richard FitzAlan, 11th Earl of Arundel and Lady Elizabeth de Bohun, daughter of William de Bohun, 1st Earl of Northampton, by whom he had two sons and three daughters.

Mowbray's eldest son and his namesake, inherited the earldom of Nottingham but rebelled against Henry IV in 1405 and was beheaded at 19. The younger Thomas had married Constance, daughter of John Holland, Duke of Exeter around 1400. Mowbray's second son, John, thus inherited his father's earldoms. John married Katherine Neville, daughter of the northern magnate Ralph, Earl of Westmorland in 1412, and for loyal service under Henry V, John was restored to the dukedom of Norfolk in 1425.

Mowbray's oldest daughter Elizabeth married Michael de la Pole, 3rd Earl of Suffolk by 1403. Michael was described by a contemporary chronicler as being "as strong, as active and as daring as any member of the court" of Henry V, and, dying at the Battle of Agincourt in 1415, was one of the few notable English deaths. Margaret, the second daughter, married twice, first to Sir Robert Howard, by whom she was the mother of John Howard, 1st Duke of Norfolk. She was married by 1420; Robert Howard may have been a retainer of the 2nd Duke of Norfolk and certainly fought with him in France. Her second marriage was to Sir John Grey of Ruthin, Denbighshire, an old friend of the Mowbrays. She died in 1459. The youngest daughter Isabel also married twice. Her first husband was Sir Henry Ferrers, son of William, Baron Ferrers of Groby; Henry died in 1425. She married secondly James Berkeley, 1st Baron Berkeley.

== Estates ==
The patrimony that Mowbray inherited was substantial, predominantly based around East Anglia, and focused on the family's holdings in Leicestershire, Lincolnshire and Yorkshire. These included the important manors of Melton Mowbray and their Caput baroniae of Axholme. His mother's Segrave inheritance augmented these estates, bringing him manors in Huntingdonshire, Norfolk, Sussex, Warwickshire and Wiltshire. His second wife—whose father, the Earl of Arundel, was one of the wealthiest men in the country—brought him further estates in Norfolk, as well as more in Buckinghamshire and Essex. His landed income was in the region of £1,475 per annum. Given-Wilson calls this "a sizeable patrimony, but not one which would have put Mowbray in the first rank of English earls". However, this figure does not include the various gifts of valuables or grants of office and land he received from the King. Further, on the death of his grandmother, Countess Margaret, he would have expected to gain another major power base in East Anglia, particularly centred on Framlingham Castle. There was also a swathe of land across Yorkshire, stretching through Hovingham, Thirsk and Nidderdale. Combined with her estates on the Welsh Marches, around Chepstow, and other English counties, these have been adjudged to be worth approximately another £3000 annually. Saul has estimated his annual income at around £2,000 per annum.

== Cultural representations ==
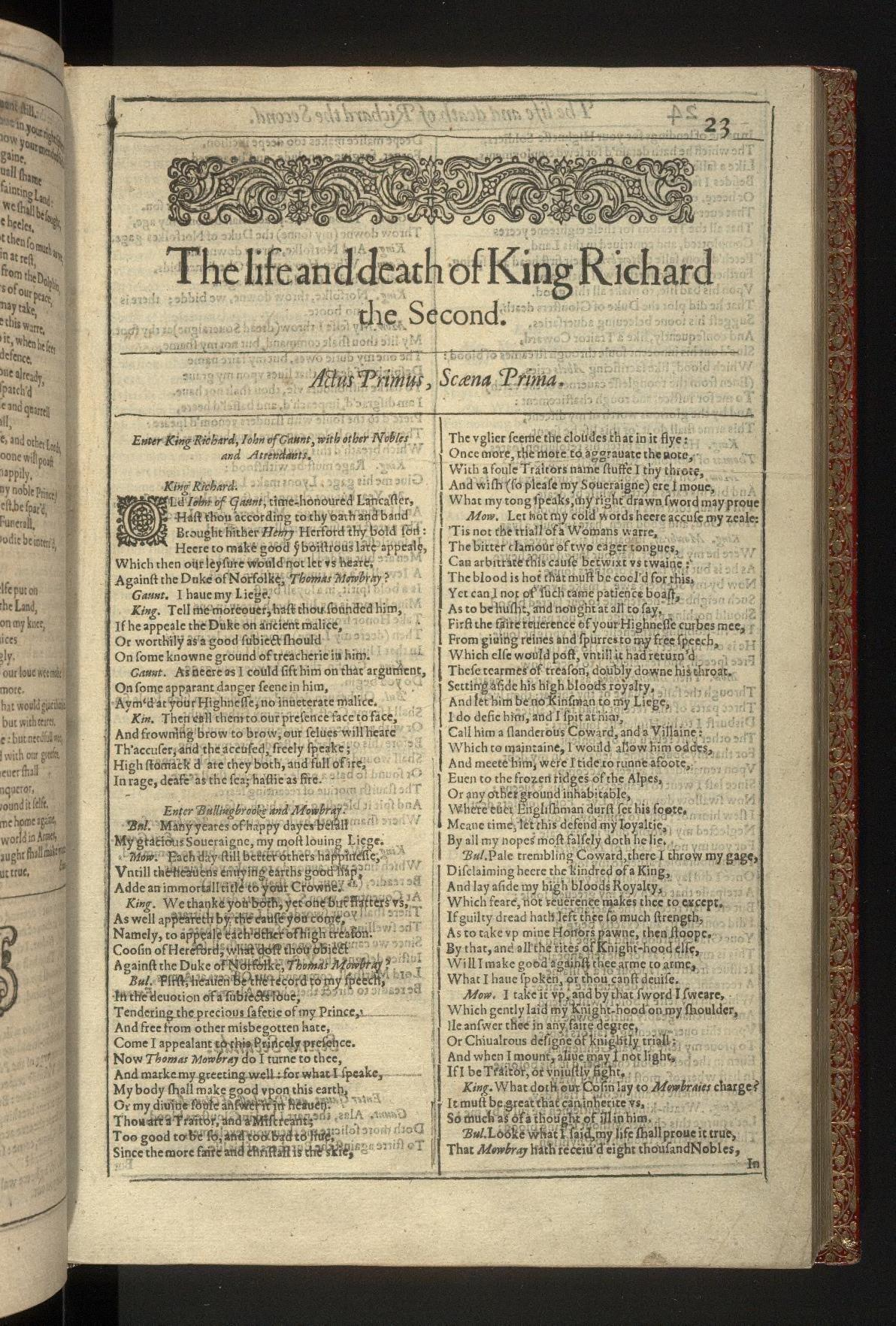
Title page of Shakespeare's Richard II, opening with the quarrel between Mowbray and Bolingbroke, from the 1623 First Folio.

=== Tudor ===
As Thomas Mowbray, his quarrel with Bolingbroke and subsequent banishment are depicted in the opening scene of Shakespeare's Richard II. Mowbray is charged not only with Gloucester's murder but also with embezzling money intended to pay for the Calais garrison. The King promises that "frowning brow to brow, ourselves will hear / The accuser and the accused freely speak", although Mowbray professes himself unable to speak as freely as he wished due to the King's blood links with Bolingbroke. Mowbray's fears are unfounded: Richard describes Bolingbroke's charges as based on "ancient malice", and Mowbray is goaded into making his challenge for trial by combat, presumably so the King cannot find in his favour. Mowbray, understanding he is a pawn in the King's plans, prophetically replies to Richard's "Lions make leopards tame" with the retort, "Yea, but not change his spots". Bolingbroke's accusations, argues Dr. Imke Lichterfeld, "are grave indeed", and range from the embezzlement of 8,000 nobles, (Note: A noble was a gold coin valued at 6 shillings 8 pence, equivalent to one-third of a pound sterling.) to the death of Gloucester and treason: three crimes each worse than the last.

His death in exile is announced later in the play by the Bishop of Carlisle. Mowbray is also mentioned in Henry IV, Part II, as having once employed the now-dissolute Falstaff as a page. The implication in that scene, set around 1405, is that Mowbray represents an extinct generation of great warriors, particularly as he is the last Englishman to have died on a crusade in the Shakespearean canon. When Shakespeare was writing, deposition was a politically sensitive subject, as, like Richard, Elizabeth I was also childless and increasingly paranoid of dynastic threats from her nobility. Shakespeare uses the exiling of Mowbray and Bolingbroke to represent the exiling of Catholic recusants during her later reign; and, suggests scholar Alfred Thomas, "would thus have resonated with those Elizabethans who had been forced to repudiate their native English tongue as they assumed a life of exile in Catholic Europe". Further forcing comparison with Elizabeth, Mowbray outright rejects his sovereign's "women's war" of words. (Note: The literary historian Alfred Thomas has argued that Elizabeth probably understood the parallels that could be read into the play with her own reign. He bases this theory on the fact that in 1601, she told her record keeper, William Lambarde, "I am Richard II, know ye not that?" and, believed too risqué, the deposition scene was never performed in her lifetime.)

Mowbray appears in William Baldwin's and George Ferrers's A Mirror for Magistrates, from the mid-16th century. He is described as "the chief worker in the duke [of Gloucester]'s destruction", this is because Baldwin and Ferrers follow Robert Fabyan's view that by revealing Gloucester's plot against the King, Mowbray thereby sealed the Duke's fate, rather than because he was in Calais himself. They also suggest that Mowbray was perhaps the least committed of the Appellants in 1386. Mowbray is also the subject of a ballad by the late Tudor poet Thomas Deloney, "A Song of the Banishment of Two Dukes, Hereford and Norfolke". Deloney is faithful to the chronicles he follows, vilifying Mowbray—who is called "most untrue" to the King—and emphasising Bolingbroke's wisdom and righteousness and his God-given claim to the throne. Mowbray is blamed for the King's troubles:

First Henry Duke of Hereford ere fifteene dayes be past:
Shall part this Realme on paine of death, while ten yeares space doth last.
And Thomas Duke of Norfolk thou, that hast begun this strife,
And thereof no good proofe canst bring,
I say for term of life.

=== Modern ===
Mowbray has been a major role in most adaptions of Shakespeare's Richard II, and only a few can be mentioned here. As Duke of Norfolk, he was portrayed by Noel Johnson in the BBC's fifteen-part serial adaptation of Shakespeare's history plays, An Age of Kings in 1960. Ian McKellen, in an early role, took the play on a provincial tour with the Prospect Theatre Company, with Stephen Greif as Mowbray, in 1960; he is last seen visiting Gloucester, with guards, carrying a mattress, reflecting the contemporary rumour of his suffocation. 1973 saw John Barton's Stratford-upon-Avon production, with Denis Holmes to Richard Pasco's King, in which Mowbray and Bolingbroke fought each other on massive hobby horses. Barton's production transferred to the Aldwych Theatre the following year. Five years later, David Giles production saw Richard Owens as Mowbray in the BBC's BBC Television Shakespeare, the entire canon transmitted over a period of seven years. Derek Jacobi led, and Gilles focussed on the ambiguity of the King's relationship with Mowbray, who had been his friend and loyal servant but could not yet trust again.

One of the first plays put on by the newly formed English Shakespeare Company, Mowbray was played by Michael Cronin between 1987 and 1988 to Michael Pennington's Richard. Indeed, it had been the RSC's failure to cast Pennington as Richard the previous year—taken by Jeremy Irons with Richard Moore as the Duke—that led to the formation of the breakaway group. Moore played Mowbray as an artisan-type, rather than a military man, with bright green clothes and a clumsy gait. David Lyon played to David Threlfall's Bolingbroke in Deborah Warner's 1995 production at the National Theatre's Cottesloe. This production was notable for the casting of Fiona Shaw as King Richard. Lyon reprised his role when Warner adapted her production for television two years later. Critic Michael Hattaway noted that, by then, "the uninformed resentment at the take-over of one of Shakespeare's greatest roles by a woman had been quelled by the excellence and intelligence of Shaw's performance".

In 2000, Steven Pimlott directed David Troughton as Bolingbroke to Samuel West's Richard, with Paul Greenwood playing what critic Rhoda Koenig described as a "quietly intense, harshly whispering" Mowbray. Norfolk. He was played by James Purefoy in the BBC2 series The Hollow Crown, a 2012 television film adaptation of Shakespeare's Henriad, while the following year David Tennant took the leading role in Gregory Doran's RSC production, against Antony Byrne's Mowbray.

While Mowbray's purported murder of Gloucester takes place before Shakespeare's narrative begins, Mowbray does not appear in the play named after his victim, Thomas of Woodstock.

== Citations ==
=== Works ===
- Allington-Smith, R. (2003). Henry Despenser: The Fighting Bishop. Dereham: Larks Press. ISBN 978-1-90400-616-9.
- Archer, R. E. (1995). "Parliamentary Restoration: John Mowbray and the Dukedom of Norfolk in 1425". In Archer, R. E.; Walker, S. (eds.). Rulers and Ruled in Late Medieval England: Essays Presented to Gerald Harriss. London: Hambledon Press. pp. 99–116. ISBN 978-1-85285-133-0.
- Archer, R. E. (2004a). "Mowbray, John, Second Earl of Nottingham (1385–1405)". Oxford Dictionary of National Biography (online ed.). Oxford University Press. doi:10.1093/ref:odnb/19460. ISBN 978-0-19-861412-8. (Subscription, Wikipedia Library access or UK public library membership required.)
- Archer, R. E. (2004b). "Mowbray, John, second duke of Norfolk (1392–1432), magnate". Oxford Dictionary of National Biography (online ed.). Oxford University Press. doi:10.1093/ref:odnb/19453. ISBN 978-0-19-861412-8. (Subscription, Wikipedia Library access or UK public library membership required.)
- Ashdown-Hill, J. (2001). "Norfolk Requiem: The Passing of the House of Mowbray". The Ricardian. 12: 198–217. OCLC 795939407.
- Ashdown-Hill, J. (2012). Richard III's 'Beloved Cousyn': John Howard and the House of York. Stroud: History Press. ISBN 978-0-75248-671-0.
- Barron, C. M. (2000). "The Reign of Richard II". In Jones, M. (ed.). The New Cambridge Medieval History: c.1300–c.1415. Vol. VI. Cambridge: Cambridge University Press. pp. 297–334. ISBN 978-0-52136-290-0.
- Bennett, M. (2018). "Late Medieval Ireland in a Wider World". In Smith, B. (ed.). The Cambridge History of Ireland. Vol. I: 600–1550. Cambridge: Cambridge University Press. pp. 329–352. ISBN 978-1-10862-525-8.
- Beswick, J. (2020). "Richard II of England and the Smithfield Tournament of October 1390: An Instrument to Establish Royal Authority". In Murray, A. V.; Watts, K. (eds.). The Medieval Tournament as Spectacle: Tourneys, Jousts and Pas D'armes, 1100–1600. Woodbridge: Boydell & Brewer. pp. 62–76. ISBN 978-1-78327-542-7.
- Bevan, B. (1994). Henry IV. New York: Palgrave Macmillan. ISBN 978-0-31211-697-2.
- Biggs, D. L. (2002). "Henry IV, 1399–1413". In Fritze, R. H.; Robison, W. B. (eds.). Historical Dictionary of Late Medieval England, 1272–1485. Westport: Greenwood. pp. 246–249. ISBN 978-0-31329-124-1.
- Biggs, D. (2006). Three Armies in Britain: The Irish Campaign of Richard II and the Usurpation of Henry IV, 1397–1399. Leiden: Brill. ISBN 978-9-00415-215-1.
- Blanton, V. (2007). Signs of Devotion: The Cult of St. Æthelthryth in Medieval England, 695–1615. Philadelphia: Penn State Press. ISBN 978-0-27104-798-0.
- Bolam, R. (2002). "Richard II: Shakespeare and the Languages of the Stage". In Hattaway, M. (ed.). The Cambridge Companion to Shakespeare's History Plays. Cambridge Companions to Literature. Cambridge: Cambridge University Press. pp. 141–157. ISBN 978-0-52177-539-7.
- British Library. "Cotton MS Nero D.vi" (1390) [manuscript]. Western Manuscripts, Series: Cotton Library, File: Documents relating to the Anglo-French and Anglo-Scottish Wars. London: British Library.
- Brown, R. (1842). "Achievement of Thomas Mowbray, Duke of Norfolk". Archaeologia. 29: 387–389. OCLC 183351695.
- Burke, B. (1884). The General Armory of England, Scotland, Ireland, and Wales, Comprising a Registry of Armorial Bearings from the Earliest to the Present Time (1st ed.). London: Harrisons. OCLC 1336131959.
- Burtscher, M. (2008). The Fitzalans: Earls of Arundel and Surrey, Lords of the Welsh Marches (1267–1415). Logaston: Logaston Press. ISBN 978-1-90439-694-9.
- Butcher, D. (2016). Medieval Lowestoft: The Origins and Growth of a Suffolk Coastal Community. Woodbridge: Boydell & Brewer. ISBN 978-1-78327-149-8.
- Casola, P. (1907). Canon Pietro Casola's Pilgrimage to Jerusalem in the Year 1494. Manchester Historical Series. Vol. V. Manchester: Manchester University Press. OCLC 470128636.
- Chapman, A. (2015). Welsh Soldiers in the Later Middle Ages, 1282–1422. Woodbridge: Boydell. ISBN 978-1-78327-031-6.
- Cleveland, C. L. W. P. (1889). The Battle Abbey Roll: With Some Account of the Norman Lineages. Vol. II. London: J. Murray. OCLC 1621691.
- Cokayne, G. E. (1936). Doubleday, H. A. (ed.). The Complete Peerage of England, Scotland, Ireland, Great Britain and the United Kingdom: Extant, Extinct or Dormant. Vol. IX. London: St. Catherine Press. OCLC 61913647.
- Collins, H. E. L. (2000). The Order of the Garter, 1348–1461: Chivalry and Politics in Late Medieval England. Oxford: Clarendon Press. ISBN 978-0-19820-817-4.
- Corbin, P.; Sedge, D. (2002). Thomas of Woodstock, Or, Richard the Second, Part One. Manchester: Manchester University Press. ISBN 978-0-71901-563-2.
- Craig, L. H. (2015). The Philosopher's English King: Shakespeare's Henriad as Political Philosophy. Woodbridge: Boydell & Brewer. ISBN 978-1-58046-531-1.
- Crawford, A. (2010). Yorkist Lord: John Howard, Duke of Norfolk, c.1425–1485. London: Continuum. ISBN 978-1-44117-997-5.
- Curry, A. (2011). "Disciplinary Ordinances for English and Franco-Scottish Armies in 1385: An International Code?". Journal of Medieval History. 37 (3): 269–294. doi:10.1016/j.jmedhist.2011.05.004. OCLC 780548052. S2CID 159906853.
- Curtis, E. (2012) [1923]. A History of Medieval Ireland: From 1086 to 1513 (repr. ed.). London: Routledge. ISBN 978-0-41552-596-1.
- Curtis, E. (1927). "The Instruments Touching upon Ireland". Richard II in Ireland, 1394-5: And Submissions of the Irish Chiefs. Oxford: Clarendon Press. pp. 149–201. OCLC 558208510.
- Davies, R. G. (1971). "Some Notes from the Register of Henry De Wakefield, Bishop of Worcester, on the Political Crisis of 1386–1388". The English Historical Review. 86: 547–558. doi:10.1093/ehr/LXXXVI.CCCXL.547. OCLC 925708104.
- Dodd, G. (2019). "Chaucer and the Polity". In Johnson, I. (ed.). Geoffrey Chaucer in Context. Cambridge: Cambridge University Press. pp. 337–345. ISBN 978-1-10703-564-5.
- Dowden, E. (2003). Shakespeare: A Critical Study of his Mind and Art. Cambridge: Cambridge University Press. ISBN 978-1-10800-076-5.
- Dunn, A. (2003). The Politics of Magnate Power in England and Wales, 1389–1413. Oxford Historical Monographs. Oxford: Clarendon Press. ISBN 978-0-19926-310-3.
- Editorial Staff (31 August 2013). "Full Cast Announced for RSC's Richard II Starring David Tennant". www.whatsonstage.com. WhatsOnStage.
- Favent, T. (2002). "History or Narration Concerning the Manner and Form of the Miraculous Parliament at Westminster". In Steiner, E.; Barrington, C. (eds.). The Letter of the Law: Legal Practice and Literary Production in Medieval England. Translated by Galloway, A. Ithaca: Cornell University Press. pp. 231–252. ISBN 978-0-80148-770-5.
- Fletcher, C. (2008). Richard II: Manhood, Youth, and Politics 1377–1399. Oxford Historical Monographs. Oxford: Oxford University Press. ISBN 978-0-19161-573-3.
- Garber, M. (2005). Shakespeare After All. New York: Anchor. ISBN 978-0-38572-214-8.
- Giancarlo, M. (2003). "Murder, Lies, and Storytelling: The Manipulation of Justice(s) in the Parliaments of 1397 and 1399". Speculum. 77 (1): 76–112. doi:10.2307/2903787. JSTOR 2903787. OCLC 35134109. S2CID 159794994.
- Gifford, D. (6 October 1999). "Noel Johnson". The Guardian.
- Given-Wilson, C., ed. (1993). Chronicles of the Revolution, 1397–1400: The Reign of Richard II. Manchester Medieval studies. Manchester: Manchester University Press. ISBN 978-0-71903-527-2.
- Given-Wilson, C. (1994). "Richard II, Edward II, and the Lancastrian Inheritance". The English Historical Review. 109 (432): 553–571. doi:10.1093/ehr/CIX.432.553. OCLC 51205098.
- Given-Wilson, C. (1996). The English Nobility in the Late Middle Ages: The Fourteenth-century Political Community (2nd ed.). London: Routledge. ISBN 978-0-41514-883-2.
- Given-Wilson, C. (2004). "Mowbray, Thomas, first Duke of Norfolk (1366–1399), Magnate". Oxford Dictionary of National Biography (online ed.). Oxford: Oxford University Press. doi:10.1093/ref:odnb/19459. ISBN 978-0-19-861412-8. (Subscription, Wikipedia Library access or UK public library membership required.)
- Given-Wilson, C. (2012). "The Earl of Arundel, the War with France, and the Anger of King Richard II". In Yeager, R.; Takamiya, T. (eds.). The Medieval Python: The Purposive and Provocative Work of Terry Jones. London: Palgrave Macmillan. pp. 27–38. ISBN 978-1-13707-505-5.
- Given-Wilson, C. (2016). Henry IV. Padstow: Yale University Press. ISBN 978-0-30015-419-1.
- Goodman, A. (1971). The Loyal Conspiracy: The Lords Appellant under Richard II. Coral Gables: University of Miami Press. ISBN 978-0-87024-215-1.
- Goodman, A. (1992). "Introduction". In Goodman, A.; Tuck, A. (eds.). War and Border Societies in the Middle Ages. London: Routledge. pp. 1–29. ISBN 978-1-13489-513-7.
- Goodman, A. (2013). John of Gaunt: The Exercise of Princely Power in Fourteenth-Century Europe (repr. ed.). London: Routledge. ISBN 978-1-31789-480-3.
- Guard, T. (2013). Chivalry, Kingship and Crusade: The English Experience in the Fourteenth Century. Woodbridge: Boydell. ISBN 978-1-84383-824-1.
- Harriss, G. L. (2005). Shaping the Nation: England, 1360–1461. Oxford: Clarendon Press. ISBN 978-0-19956-448-4.
- Hartley, C. (2013). A Historical Dictionary of British Women. London: Routledge. ISBN 978-1-13535-534-0.
- Holland, P. (1997). English Shakespeares: Shakespeare on the English Stage in the 1990s. Cambridge: Cambridge University Press. ISBN 978-0-52156-476-2.
- Griffiths, R. A. (2021). "The Later Middle Ages (1290—1485)". In Morgan, K. O. (ed.). The Oxford History of Britain (2021 ed.). Oxford: Oxford University Press. pp. 192–256. ISBN 978-0-19884-111-1.
- Gundy, A. K. (2013). Richard II and the Rebel Earl. Cambridge: Cambridge University Press. ISBN 978-1-10742-372-5.
- King, A. (2002). "'Pur Salvation Du Roiaume': Military Service and Obligation in Fourteenth-century Northumberland". In Given-Wilson, C.; Saul, N. (eds.). Fourteenth Century England. Woodbridge: Boydell Press. pp. 13–32. ISBN 978-0-85115-891-4.
- Hentschell, R. (2012). "Deloney, Thomas". In Sullivan, G. A.; Stewart, A.; Lemon, R.; McDowell, N.; Richards, J. (eds.). The Encyclopedia of English Renaissance Literature. Vol. I. Oxford: John Wiley. pp. 267–271. ISBN 978-1-40519-449-5.
- Holderness, G. (1994) [1985]. "Radical Potentiality and Institutional Closure: Shakespeare in Film and Television". In Dollimore, J.; Sinfield, A. (eds.). Political Shakespeare: Essays in Cultural Materialism (2nd ed.). Manchester: Manchester University Press. pp. 182–201. ISBN 978-0-7190-4352-9.
- Howell, M. C. (2009). The Marriage Exchange: Property, Social Place, and Gender in Cities of the Low Countries, 1300-1550. Women in Culture and Society. Chicago: University of Chicago Press. ISBN 978-0-22635-517-7.
- Johnston, D. (1980). "Richard II and the Submissions of Gaelic Ireland". Irish Historical Studies. 22 (85): 1–20. doi:10.1017/S0021121400024718. OCLC 908672267. S2CID 164179931.
- Joseph, C. B. (1899). The History of the Noble House of Stourton, of Stourton, in the County of Wilts. London: E. Stock. OCLC 906225476.
- Keen, M. (1995). "Richard II's Ordinances of War of 1385". In Archer, R. E.; Walker, S. (eds.). Rulers and Ruled in Late Medieval England: Essays Presented to Gerald Harriss. London: Hambledon Press. pp. 33–48. ISBN 978-1-85285-133-0.
- Koenig, R. (27 December 2000). "Born to Rule: You Know the Type". The Independent.
- Lahey, S. E. (2003). Philosophy and Politics in the Thought of John Wyclif. Cambridge: Cambridge University Press. ISBN 978-1-13943-929-9.
- Lewis, M. (2022). Rebellion in the Middle Ages: Fight Against the Crown. Barnsley: Pen & Sword History. ISBN 978-1-52672-793-0.
- Lichterfeld, I. (2016). "'Thou Livest and Breathest, yet Art Thou Slain in Him': The Absence of Power in 'Richard II". Comparative Drama. 50 (2–3): 195–207. doi:10.1353/cdr.2016.0018. OCLC 1564550. S2CID 191886162.
- Lucas, S. C. (2019). A Mirror for Magistrates: A Modernized and Annotated Edition. Cambridge: Cambridge University Press. ISBN 978-1-31699-802-1.
- Lumby, J. R., ed. (1886). The Chronicles and Memorials of Great Britain and Ireland during the Middle Ages. Rolls Series. Vol. IX. London: Longman. OCLC 7327411751.
- Mann, F. O. (1912). The Works of Thomas Deloney. Oxford: Clarendon Press. OCLC 241862.
- Marcombe, D. (2003). Leper Knights: The Order of St. Lazarus of Jerusalem in England, c.1150–1544. Woodbridge: Boydell. ISBN 978-1-84383-067-2.
- Marx, C. W. (2003). An English Chronicle, 1377-1461: Edited from Aberystwyth, National Library of Wales MS 21068 and Oxford, Bodleian Library MS Lyell 34. Woodbridge: Boydell. ISBN 978-0-85115-793-1.
- McConnell, L. (2000). Dictionary of Shakespeare. Chicago: Fitzroy Dearborn. ISBN 978-1-57958-215-9.
- McGettigan, D. (2016). Richard II and the Irish Kings. Dublin: Four Courts Press. ISBN 978-1-84682-602-3.
- McVitty, A. E. (2017). "The Prisoner's Voice in Conflicting Narratives of Loyalty and Political Legitimacy in Late Medieval England". Parergon. 34 (2): 25–47. doi:10.1353/pgn.2017.0034. OCLC 1785479. S2CID 149370073.
- McVitty, E. A. (2020). Treason and Masculinity in Medieval England: Gender, Law and Political Culture. Woodbridge: Boydell & Brewer. ISBN 978-1-78327-555-7.
- Morgan, P. (2013). "Going to the Wars: Thomas, Lord Morley in France, 1416". In Villalon, L. J. A.; Kagay, D. J. (eds.). The Hundred Years War: Further Considerations. Lieden: Brill. pp. 285–316. ISBN 978-9-00424-564-8.
- Mortimer, I. (2009). Henry IV: The Righteous King. London: Rosetta Books. ISBN 978-0-79533-543-3.
- Moore, T. K. (2012). "The Cost–Benefit Analysis of a Fourteenth-Century Naval Campaign: Margate/Cadzand, 1387". In Gorski, R. (ed.). Roles of the Sea in Medieval England. Woodbridge: Boydell. pp. 103–124. ISBN 978-1-84383-701-5.
- Naylor, Gary (2020). "BWW Review: The Hollow Crown I". BroadwayWorld.com.
- Oakeshott, R. E. (1996). The Archaeology of Weapons: Arms and Armor from Prehistory to the Age of Chivalry. Mineola: Dover. ISBN 978-0-48629-288-5.
- PBS (2013). "The Hollow Crown: Shakespeare's History Plays". PBS.
- Powell, J. E.; Wallis, K. (1968). The House of Lords in the Middle Ages. London: Weidenfeld & Nicolson. OCLC 925614987.
- Parliament Rolls of Medieval England ("PROME") (2005a). Given-Wilson, C.; Brand, P.; Phillips, S.; Ormrod, M.; Martin, G.; Curry, A.; Horrox, R. E. (eds.). "Richard II: October 1386". British History Online. Woodbridge: Boydell and Brewer.
- Parliament Rolls of Medieval England ("PROME") (2005b). Given-Wilson, C.; Brand, P.; Phillips, S.; Ormrod, M.; Martin, G.; Curry, A.; Horrox, R. E. (eds.). "Richard II: September 1397". British History Online. Woodbridge: Boydell and Brewer.
- Rasor, E. L. (2004). English/British Naval History to 1815: A Guide to the Literature. Westport: Greenwood. ISBN 978-0-31330-547-4.
- Roe, J. A. (2002). Shakespeare and Machiavelli. Cambridge: DS Brewer. ISBN 978-0-85991-764-3.
- Roskell, J. S. (1984). The Impeachment of Michael de la Pole, Earl of Suffolk in 1386: In the Context of the Reign of Richard II. Manchester: Manchester University Press. ISBN 978-0-71900-963-1.
- Ross, J. (2011). The Foremost Man of the Kingdom: John de Vere, Thirteenth Earl of Oxford (1442–1513). Woodbridge: Boydell & Brewer. ISBN 978-1-78327-005-7.
- Round, J. H. (1899). Commune of London and Other Studies. London: Archibald. OCLC 1171619263.
- Routh, P.; Knowles, R. (1990). "The Markenfield Collar". The Yorkshire Archaeological Journal. 62: 133–140. OCLC 827767417.
- Sanderlin, S. (1988). "Chaucer and Ricardian Politics". The Chaucer Review. 22: 171–184. OCLC 43359050.
- Saul, N. (1997). Richard II. Bury St Edmunds: Yale University Press. ISBN 978-0-30007-003-3.
- Scott, F. R. (1943). "Chaucer and the Parliament of 1386". Speculum. 18 (1): 80–86. doi:10.2307/2853640. JSTOR 2853640. OCLC 25967434. S2CID 159965790.
- Sessions, W. A. (1999). Henry Howard, the Poet Earl of Surrey: A Life. Oxford: Oxford University Press. ISBN 978-0-19-818625-0.
- Shakespeare, W. (1623). The Life and Death of Richard the Second (First Folio ed.). London: Isaac Iaggard & Ed. Blount. OCLC 56257571.
- Shewring, M. (1996). King Richard II. Shakespeare in Performance. Manchester: Manchester University Press. ISBN 978-0-71904-626-1.
- Stöber, K. (2007). Late Medieval Monasteries and their Patrons: England and Wales, c.1300–1540. Woodbridge: Boydell. ISBN 978-1-84383-284-3.
- Sumption, J. (2009). The Hundred Years' War: Divided Houses. Vol. III (paperback ed.). London: Faber & Faber. ISBN 978-0-57124-012-8.
- Thomas, A. (2018). Shakespeare, Catholicism, and the Middle Ages: Maimed Rights. Cham: Palgrave Macmillan. ISBN 978-3-31990-218-0.
- Thornton, T. (2012). The Channel Islands, 1370-1640: Between England and Normandy. Woodbridge: Boydell Press. ISBN 978-1-84383-711-4.
- Tuck, A. (1973). Richard II and the English Nobility. London: Edward Arnold. ISBN 978-0-71315-708-6.
- Tuck, A. (2004a). "Richard II (1367–1400)". Oxford Dictionary of National Biography (online ed.). Oxford University Press. doi:10.1093/ref:odnb/23499. ISBN 978-0-19-861412-8. (Subscription, Wikipedia Library access or UK public library membership required.)
- Tuck, A. (2004b). "Beauchamp, Thomas, twelfth earl of Warwick (1337x9–1401)". Oxford Dictionary of National Biography (online ed.). Oxford University Press. doi:10.1093/ref:odnb/1841. ISBN 978-0-19-861412-8. (Subscription, Wikipedia Library access or UK public library membership required.)
- Tyerman, C. (1988). England and the Crusades 1095–1588. Chicago: Chicago University Press. ISBN 978-0-22682-013-2.
- Usk, A. (1904). Thompson, E. M. (ed.). Chronicon Adae de Usk, A.D. 1377–1421 (2nd ed.). London: H. Frowde. OCLC 871729931.
- VCH (1906) [1906]. "Houses of Carthusian monks: The Priory of Axholme". In Page, W. (ed.). A History of the County of Lincoln. Vol. 2. London: Victoria County History. pp. 158–160. OCLC 1128317094.
- Walker, S. (2004a). "John [John of Gaunt], Duke of Aquitaine and Duke of Lancaster, styled King of Castile and León (1340–1399)". Oxford Dictionary of National Biography (online ed.). Oxford University Press. doi:10.1093/ref:odnb/21931. ISBN 978-0-19-861412-8. (Subscription, Wikipedia Library access or UK public library membership required.)
- Walker, S. (2004b). "Pole, Michael de la, Second Earl of Suffolk (1367–1415)". Oxford Dictionary of National Biography (online ed.). Oxford University Press. doi:10.1093/ref:odnb/22453. ISBN 978-0-19-861412-8. (Subscription, Wikipedia Library access or UK public library membership required.)
- Walsingham, T. (2005) [1863–1864]. Clark, J. G. (ed.). The Chronica Maiora of Thomas Walsingham, 1376–1422. Translated by Preest, D. Woodbridge: Boydell Press. ISBN 978-1-84383-144-0.
- Vienne-Guerrin, N.; Hatchuel, S. (2008). Shakespeare on Screen: Television Shakespeare: Essays in Honour of Michèle Willems (in French and English). Mont-Saint-Aignan: Presses Universitaires de Rouen et du Havre. ISBN 978-2-87775-450-7.
- Warren, W. L. (2000). Henry II (Yale ed.). New Haven: Yale University Press. ISBN 978-0-30008-474-0.
- Williams, B., ed. (1846). Chronicque de la Traïson et Mort de Richard deux Roy Dengleterre (in French and English). London: Bentley, Wilson and Fley. OCLC 562005467.
- Wright, H. G. (1932). "Richard II and the Death of the Duke of Gloucester". The English Historical Review. 47: 276–80. doi:10.1093/ehr/XLVII.CLXXXVI.276. OCLC 925708104.

Political offices
Preceded by Lord Maltravers	Lord/Earl Marshal; 1383–1398	Succeeded by The Duke of Surrey
Peerage of England
New title	Duke of Norfolk; 1397–1399	Forfeit Title next held by John Mowbray V
Preceded by Margaret	Earl of Norfolk; 1399	Succeeded by Thomas Mowbray II
New creation	Earl of Nottingham; 1383–1399	Succeeded by Thomas Mowbray II
Preceded by John Mowbray IV	Baron Mowbray; Baron Segrave; 1383–1399	Succeeded by Thomas Mowbray II
