= Simon Kynnesman =

English politician

Simon Kynnesman (fl. 1421 – 1439) was an English politician who sat as MP for Northamptonshire in December 1421. Kynnesman was one of two MPs in Northamptonshire, the other being John Beaufo, who had performed no recorded administrative actions.

He was the son and heir of Joan Kynnesman, who died after 1431.
