= Richard Knightley (1617–1661) =

English Member of Parliament

Sir Richard Knightley KB (1617–1661), of Fawsley in Northamptonshire, was an English Member of Parliament (MP).

A member of Gray's Inn, Knightley was a member of a prominent Northamptonshire family who had married (in about 1637) Elizabeth Hampden, daughter of John Hampden, the leading opponent of Charles I. His cousin, also called Richard, had been MP for Northamptonshire and one of Hampden's parliamentary allies before the King dismissed Parliament in 1629. Like the rest of his family, Knightley's religious inclinations were Puritan.

When Parliament was at last summoned once more in 1640, Knightley was elected MP for Northampton. He aligned himself with the opposition, and it was at Fawsley that John Pym and other leading anti-Royalists met, presumably to discuss policy, after the dissolution of the Short Parliament. He represented Northampton again in the Long Parliaments, adhering to the Parliamentary cause when civil war broke out, and sat until he was excluded in Pride's Purge. He subsequently represented Northamptonshire in the Parliament of 1659. In 1660 he was a member of the council which arranged the recall of Charles II, and was MP for St Germans in the Convention Parliament.

As a mark of gratitude, Charles made Knightley a Knight of the Bath in June 1661, but he died shortly afterwards. His contemporary Edmund Ludlow suggested that the "popish and superstitious ceremonyes" involved in admission to the Order contributed to his death, as he

having some remaynder of conscience, scrupled for a while the bowing at the altar, and, being prevayled with to doe it, was so troubled for having done it that (as it was supposed) it was a meanes to shorten his dayes."
