= Valentine Knightley (died 1618) =

English landowner and Member of Parliament

Sir Valentine Knightley (c. 1555 – 9 December 1618) was an English landowner and member of parliament.

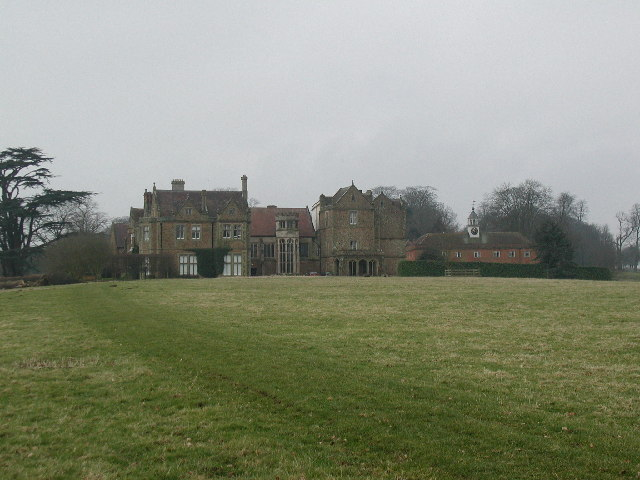
Fawsley Hall

He was the eldest son of Sir Richard Knightley of Fawsley Hall, Northamptonshire and educated at Hart Hall, Oxford (1568), where he was awarded MA in 1605 and trained for the law at Gray's Inn (1583). He was knighted on 11 May 1603 and succeeded his father in 1615.

He was elected to Parliament as MP for Tavistock in both 1584 and 1586, for Northampton in 1593 and for Tavistock again in 1597. He was knight of the shire (MP) for Northamptonshire in 1604, having also been elected for Dunwich. The latter seat was taken instead by his friend Thomas Smythe.

He served as a justice of the peace (J.P.) for Northamptonshire at various times and as a judge of assize in the oyer and terminer courts on the Oxford circuit from 1609 to his death and on the Midland circuit from 1616 to his death. He was a Member of the Virginia Company in 1611 and the North West Passage Company in 1612. He was appointed High Sheriff of Berkshire for 1617–18 and was a deputy lieutenant for Northamptonshire by 1618.

He died a rich man soon after his father in 1618 and was buried at Fawsley. He had married Anne, the daughter of Sir Edward Unton of Wadley, Berkshire, with whom he had a son (who predeceased him) and three daughters. The Fawsley estate passed to his nephew Richard, also an MP for Northamptonshire.

Parliament of England
Preceded by Nathaniel Bacon; Charles Morrison	Member of Parliament for Tavistock; 1584–1588; With: Edward Bacon 1584–1586; John Glanville 1586–1588	Succeeded by Michael Heneage; Anthony Ashley
Preceded by Peter Wentworth; Richard Knollys	Member of Parliament for Northampton; 1593–1597; With: Peter Wentworth	Succeeded by Christopher Yelverton; Henry Yelverton
Preceded by Hugh Vaughan; Richard Codrington	Member of Parliament for Tavistock; 1597–1601; With: Edward Mantagu	Succeeded by Henry Gray; Walter Wentworth
Preceded by Sir John Stanhope; William Lane	Member of Parliament for Northamptonshire; 1604–1614; With: Sir Edward Montagu	Succeeded by William Tate; Sir Edward Montagu
