= William Brabazon (Leics MP 1313) =

English politician

Sir William Brabazon KB
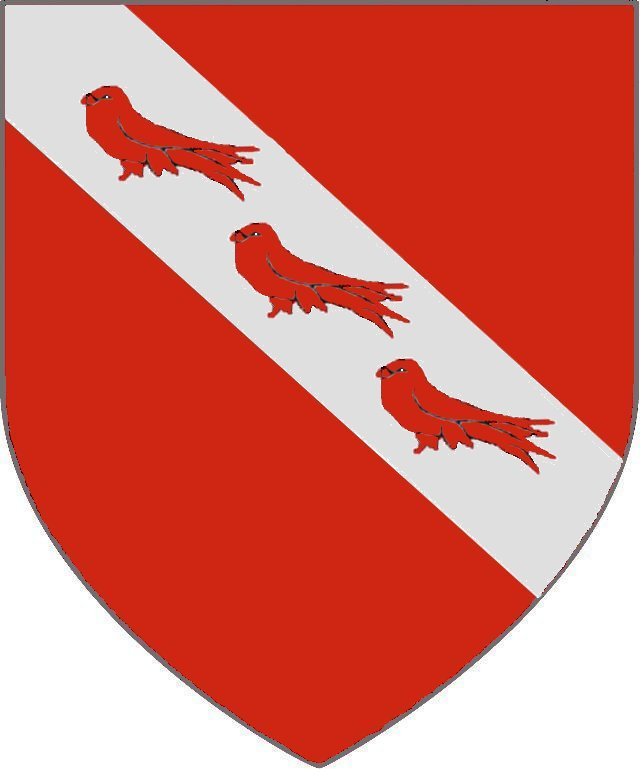
- Brabazon of Sproxton arms:- gules, on a bend argent 3 martlets of the field.

M.P. for Leicestershire
- In office 23 September 1313 – 15 November 1313
- Monarch: Edward II

M.P. for Northamptonshire
- In office 28 April 1343 – 20 May 1343
- Monarch: Edward III

Sir William Brabazon, KB of Sproxton, Leicestershire was an English politician who represented Leicestershire and Northamptonshire in Parliament.

== Ancestry ==
He was descended from Matthew Brabazon, the younger brother and heir of the Chief Justice of the King's Bench Roger Brabazon.

== Career and life ==
William responded to King Edward I's call to arms to gather at Westminster and was knighted by Edward, the then Prince of Wales, in the Feast of the Swans at Westminster Abbey on 22 May 1306.

Sir William sat in the Parliament of September 1313 for Leicestershire.

He served in Guienne in 1325.

He sat in the Parliament of April 1343 for Northamptonshire.

== Family ==
Sir William had the following issue:-

- John Brabazon. Sole daughter and heir Jane married Sir William Woodford, Serjeant-at-law, into which family the Brabazons' lands passed.

Sir William Brabazon was the ancestor of William Brabazon, Lord Justice of Ireland, and his Earl of Meath descendants.
