= Robert Lane (born 1527) =

English politician (1527–c.1588)

Robert Lane (1527 – c. 1588) was an English politician. He was the son of Sir Ralph Lane and Lady Maud Parr (a daughter of William Parr, 1st Baron Parr of Horton and cousin of Queen Katherine Parr.

He was a member (MP) of the Parliament of England for Northamptonshire in March 1553, and 1571, and for Gatton in 1563.

He was the brother of Sir Ralph Lane.

He married Katherine Copley (d.1563), the daughter of Sir Roger Copley of Gatton in Surrey by his wife Elizabeth Shelley, the daughter of Sir William Shelley, and had three sons: Sir William Lane, Sir Parr Lane and Sir Robert Lane.
