= Maud Lane =

English courtier (c.1507–1558)

Maud, Lady Lane
- Born: c.1507
- Died: 1558 or 1559
- Occupation: courtier
- Known for: Gentlewoman to Queen Katherine Parr
- Spouse: Ralph Lane

Maud Lane born Magdalen (Maud) Parr became Matilda or Maud, Lady Lane (c. 1507 – 1558) was an English courtier. She was the cousin of Katherine Parr and she became her courtier and supporter of the new Church of England religion.

== Life ==
She was the first born daughter of Mary Salisbury and William Parr, 1st Baron Parr of Horton. Her grandfather was Sir William Salisbury and his mother's dowry had been the Manor of Horton. Her godfather was her uncle, the father of Katherine Parr. Maud grew up with her cousin Katherine Parr.

Her father decided to make her his sole heir when she was about ten. She had three younger sisters, but no brother. She was engaged to be married to the eight year old Ralph Lane. Her father became the guardian to the couple and her new father-in-law was William Lane of Orlingbury. The marriage was to be consecrated ten years later when her fiancé was eighteen. Her father ceased to be their guardian as promised when her husband was twenty.

Katherine Parr became the last Queen Consort of King Henry VIII and Maud became her lady-in-waiting in July 1543. Maud paid £980 to have the rights of ownership and to pass on the rights to the two manors of Hogshaw in Buckinghamshire and Wheatley in Warwickshire.

In 1546 Bishop Stephen Gardiner led a conservative plot to discredit Lane. The plan was to find evidence of her heresy but the plot failed and plans to arrest the Queen and two of her ladies were not enacted. Gardiners position was reduced by this. One source says that she continued to be a lifelong friend and confidante of the Queen, but another says that Lane left the royal court and died in 1558 or 1559.

== Private life ==
She and Sir Ralph Lane of Orpington had three sons: politician Robert Lane was born in 1527, Ralph (later governor of Virginia), and William Lane, Member of Parliament. Their seven girls included Frances who married Sir George Turpin, Lettice who married Peter Wentworth, Mary who married Thomas Pigot, with whom she became the mother of MP Thomas Pigott, Jane who married firstly the MP Lewis Montgomery and secondly Thomas Bawde, Dorothy who married Sir William Fielding and Katherine who married John Osborne.
