= Ralph Lane =

16th-century English politician and explorer (c.1532–1603)

Sir Ralph Lane

Member of Parliament for Higham Ferrers
- In office 1556 – January 1559

Personal details
- Born: c.1532
- Died: October 1603 (aged 70–71)
- Resting place: St Patrick's Cathedral, Dublin, Ireland; 53°20′22″N 6°16′17″W
- Occupation: Explorer

Sir Ralph Lane (c. 1532 – October 1603) was an English explorer of the Elizabethan era. He helped colonise the Kingdom of Ireland in 1583 and was sheriff of County Kerry, Ireland, from 1583 to 1585. He was part of the unsuccessful attempt in 1585 to colonise Roanoke Island, North Carolina. He was knighted by the Queen in 1593.

== Early life and education ==
According to the Oxford Dictionary of National Biography, his parents were Sir Ralph Lane of Orlingbury, Hogshaw and Horton, and Maud Lane, a cousin of Catherine Parr, the last Queen Consort of Henry VIII.

He was the brother of Robert Lane.

Lane's seal bore the arms of Lane of Horton (Cal State Papers Ireland 15 March 1598–9), and the arms assigned him by Burke quarter these with those of Maud Parr (General Armoury). In his correspondence, he speaks of nephews William and Robert Lane (Cal State Papers Ireland 26 Dec 1592, 7 June 1595), of a kinsman John Durrant (ib) and is associated with a Mr Feilding (ib 23 June 1593), all of whom appear in the Lane pedigree (Blore Hist. and Antig. of Rutlandshire p 169). William Feilding married Dorothy Lane, a daughter of Sir Ralph Lane of Horton, and John Durrant was the husband of Catherine, her first cousin."

== Career ==
Lane was made Member of Parliament for Higham Ferrers in 1556. The choice was surprising, though it may be explained by the connections Lane had in the area, including with the Sheriff of Northamptonshire as well as his London residence, intended to be less costly than if he had served from Higham Ferrers itself.

Lane began serving the Crown in 1563 as an equerry under Queen Elizabeth I. His duties as an officer of the Royal Household included law enforcement and collection of customs duties. He served against the northern rebels in 1569, was commissioner of piracy in 1571 and a captain in the Netherlands in 1572–3. He was elected Member of Parliament for Higham Ferrers in 1558 and for Northampton in 1563.

== Roanoke colony ==
Coat of Arms of Ralph Lane

Lane is best remembered for his attempt to establish a settlement on Roanoke Island at the request of Sir Walter Raleigh. Queen Elizabeth was looking for places to colonise and the Americas appeared ripe for English expansion. The voyage began on 9 April 1585, when Lane set sail from Plymouth with Raleigh's cousin, Sir Richard Grenville, a sailor who upon return to England wrote a book about his findings in the Chesapeake. The fleet comprised the Tiger (Grenville's), the Roebuck, the Red Lion, the Elizabeth, and the Dorothy. The voyage on the Tiger proved difficult, as Lane quarrelled with the aggressive leadership of Grenville, whom he found a person of "intolerable pride and insatiable ambition". Unfortunately, during a severe storm off the coast of Portugal, the Tiger was separated from the rest of the fleet. The Tiger arrived on 11 May to Baye's Muskito (Guayanilla, Puerto Rico). While waiting for the other ships, Grenville established relations with the Spanish (whilst at the same time participating in privateering against their ships) and also built a small fortress. The Elizabeth arrived shortly after construction of the fortress.

Finally, Grenville grew tired of waiting for the remaining ships and departed on 7 June. The fort was abandoned and its location is now unknown. When the Tiger sailed through the Ocracoke Inlet on 26 June, she ran aground on a sand bank, ruining most of the food supply. The expedition managed to repair the ship, and in early July met the Roebuck and Dorothy, which had come to the Outer Banks a few weeks earlier. The Red Lion had accompanied them, but simply landed its passengers and sailed to Newfoundland for privateering. After an initial exploration of the continental coast and its Indian settlements, Grenville accused the natives of one village Aquascogoc of stealing a silver cup and in retaliation looted and burned the village.

Despite this incident and the shortage of food, Lane and 107 other settlers were left on Roanoke Island, Virginia, on 17 August 1585 to establish a colony on its north end. They built a small fort, probably similar to the one at Guayanilla Bay, but Lane and Grenville fell out with each other, a foretaste of the troubles that dogged the colony until the end. In the bitter correspondence with London that was to ensue, Lane was described as vain, boastful, and fiery-tempered, brooking little opposition. Almost immediately, Grenville and his crew set sail for England, promising to return in April 1586 with more men and fresh supplies. Contact was quickly made with the local Native Americans. The English treated them with suspicious harshness; on several occasions the colonists kidnapped Indians to extort supplies or extract information. Lane's military background led him to rely more upon arms than diplomacy, and that approach soured his dealings with the natives from the start.

April 1586 passed with no news of Grenville. In June, the incident of the stolen cup led to a retaliatory attack against the fort that the settlers were able to repel. Also in June, Sir Francis Drake arrived at Roanoke and offered Lane and his men a return voyage to England, which Lane readily accepted because of a weakened food supply and increased tensions with local tribes. Drake's fleet reached Portsmouth on 28 July, at which the settlers of Roanoke introduced snuff, corn, to England. The Account of Ralph Lane first appeared in Richard Hakluyt's Principall Navigations, Voyages, Traffiques and Discoveries of the English Nation in 1589.

The Grenville relief fleet arrived shortly after Drake's departure with the settlers. Finding the colony abandoned, Grenville returned to England with the bulk of his force, leaving behind a small detachment to maintain a British presence and protect Raleigh's claim to Virginia.

Lane later participated in other expeditions. In January 1592 he was appointed muster-master general of Ireland and was knighted the following year by Sir William FitzWilliam, the Lord Deputy of Ireland.

== Death ==
In 1594, Lane was severely wounded during the Nine Years' War in Ireland. He never fully recovered and died in 1603 at Dublin, where he was buried in St. Patrick's Cathedral.

== See also ==
- List of colonial governors of North Carolina
- List of colonial governors of Virginia

Government offices
New office	Governor of Roanoke; 1585–1586	Succeeded by John White as Governor of Raleigh (Virginia)
