= John Tyndale =

English politician

John Tyndale (died 1413), of Deene, Northamptonshire, was an English politician.

He was a member (MP) of the parliament of England for Northamptonshire in January 1380, October 1382, February 1383, April 1384, November 1384, 1386, 1393 and 1407, and for Cambridgeshire in September 1397.
