= Richard Knightley (died 1639) =

17th-century English politician

Richard Knightley MP, JP
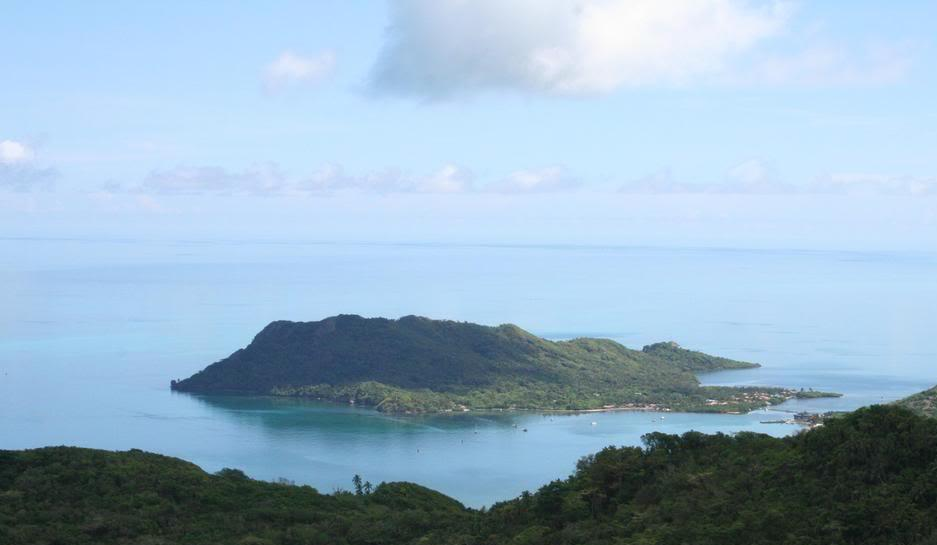
- Knightley was a founder of the Providence Island colony, now Providencia, Colombia

Member of Parliament for Northamptonshire 1621-1625
- In office March 1628 – March 1629
- Monarch: Charles I

Sheriff of Northamptonshire
- In office 1626–1626

Personal details
- Born: 3 June 1593 Preston Capes, Northamptonshire
- Died: 8 November 1639 (aged 46) Fawsley Hall
- Spouse: Bridget Lucy (1614–death)
- Relations: Sir Richard Knightley (1533-1615); Sir Valentine Knightley
- Education: Gray's Inn
- Occupation: Politician and Puritan activist

Richard Knightley (3 June 1593 – 8 November 1639) was an English lawyer and politician, who was a Member of Parliament, and Sheriff of Northamptonshire in 1626.

Although not as well known as John Pym, or his neighbour and friend, John Hampden, he was a long-time, high-profile opponent of the policies of Charles I. In 1630, he was a founder of the Puritan-backed Providence Island colony, which provided an organisational structure for what became the Parliamentary opposition prior to the 1642 to 1646 First English Civil War.

He died in September 1639, without children.

== Biographical ==
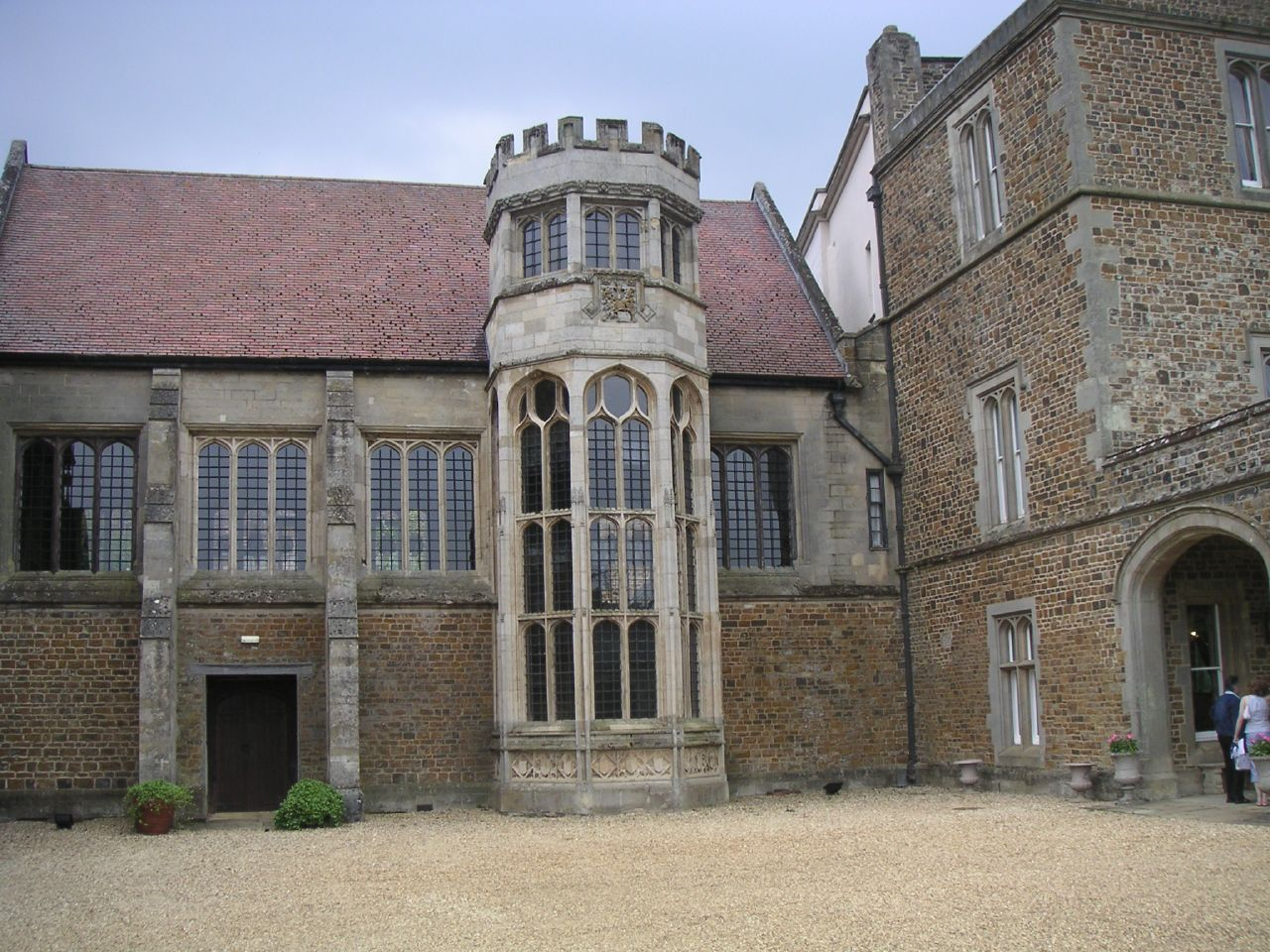
Fawsley Hall

Richard Knightley was born 3 June 1593, only surviving son of Edward Knightley, 1562 to 1598, and his wife Mary Coles, 1577 to 1610. His grandfather Sir Richard Knightley, 1533 to 1615, came from a powerful Northamptonshire family, and was a leading Puritan activist.

Only five years old when his father died, he became a ward of Sir Thomas Smythe, who among many other business ventures, served as treasurer of the Virginia Company from 1609 to 1620. Knightley became a member of the company in 1618.

In 1614, he married Bridget Lucy (ca 1597–1641), but they had no children; after his death, she was reported to be "a lunatic". Four years later, he succeeded his uncle Sir Valentine Knightley, and inherited Fawsley Hall; on his death, it passed to his cousin, another Richard Knightley, (1580–1650).

== Career ==
Although Knightley attended legal school at Gray's Inn, its major impact seems to have been introducing him to a group of Puritan divines, including renowned preacher, Richard Sibbes. However, Puritan simply meant anyone who wanted to reform, or 'purify', the Church of England, and covered many different views, on both doctrine and governance. Presbyterian Calvinists like Knightley were the most prominent, but Sibbes was an example of many who remained conforming members of the church.

After graduating in 1613, rather than becoming a lawyer, he applied for a license to travel in Europe, but this was refused. He married in 1614, then succeeded his uncle Sir Valentine in 1618; he later used his new status to install the Puritan nonconformist John Dod as vicar of St Mary's, Fawsley.

He was returned as Member of Parliament for Northamptonshire in 1621, and like his contemporaries John Pym and John Hampden, became notable for his anti-Catholicism. In the 17th century, religion and politics were considered interdependent; 'good government' required 'true religion', and alterations in one, implied alterations in the other. (Note: A view summarised by Hampden in the 1628 debate on the Petition of Right; "Here is 1, an innovation of religion suspected; is it not high time to take it to heart and acquaint his Majesty? 2ly, alteration of government; can you forbear when it goes no less than the subversion of the whole state? 3ly, hemmed in with enemies; is it now a time to be silent, and not to show to his Majesty that a man that has so much power uses none of it to help us? If he be no papist, papists are friends and kindred to him.") It also reflected wider concerns James was failing to support Protestant Europe, and his own son-in-law, when it was under attack from a Catholic Counter-Reformation.

1624, 1625 and 1628, and also served as High Sheriff of Northamptonshire for 1626–27. He refused to pay the King's forced loan in 1627, and thereafter acted in the House of Commons with Sir John Eliot and John Hampden in their resistance to the royal policy.

He died in September 1639.

== Sources ==
- Keeler, Mary Frear; Janssen Cole, Maija (1997). Proceedings in Parliament, 1628, Volume 4, (Yale Proceedings in Parliament). University of Rochester Press. ISBN 978-1580460095.
- Cust, Richard (2009). "Knightley, Richard (1593–1639)". Oxford Dictionary of National Biography (online ed.). Oxford University Press. doi:10.1093/ref:odnb/15745. (Subscription, Wikipedia Library access or UK public library membership required.)
- MacDonald, William W (1969). "John Pym: Parliamentarian". Historical Magazine of the Protestant Episcopal Church. 38 (1).
- Moseley, Virginia; Sgroi, Rosemary (2010). "KNIGHTLEY, Richard (1593-1639), of Fawsley, Northants". The History of Parliament: the House of Commons 1604–1629 (Online ed.). CUP. ISBN 978-1107002258.
- Thorpe, SM (1981). "KNIGHTLEY, Sir Richard (1533-1615), of Fawsley, Northants". The History of Parliament: the House of Commons 1588–1603 (Online ed.). The Stationers Company. ISBN 978-0118875011.
- Tyacke, Nicholas (2001). Aspects of English Protestantism, c. 1530–1700. Manchester University Press. ISBN 0719053919.
