= Northamptonshire (UK Parliament constituency) =

Parliamentary constituency in the United Kingdom, 1801–1832

- Former county constituency for the House of Commons

1290–1832
- Seats: Two
- Replaced by: North Northamptonshire and South Northamptonshire

The county constituency of Northamptonshire, in the East Midlands of England was a constituency of the House of Commons of the Parliament of England, then of the Parliament of Great Britain from 1707 to 1800 and of the Parliament of the United Kingdom from 1801 to 1832 and was represented in Parliament by two MPs, traditionally known as Knights of the Shire.

After 1832 the county was split into two new constituencies, North Northamptonshire and South Northamptonshire.

== Boundaries ==
The constituency consisted of the historic county of Northamptonshire. Although the county contained a number of parliamentary boroughs, each of which elected one or two MPs in its own right for parts of the period when Northamptonshire was a constituency, these areas were not excluded from the county constituency. Owning freehold property of the required value, within such boroughs, could confer a vote at the county election. (After 1832, only non-resident owners of forty shilling freeholds situated in borough seats could qualify for a county vote on the basis of that property.)

== Members of Parliament ==
=== 1290–1640 ===
Constituency created (1290)

Parliament	First member	Second member
1305 (Feb)	Oliver la Zouch	John de Seyton
1319	John de Longeville	William Trussell
1324	Henry de Trailly	
1330 (Nov)	Robert de Daventry	Edmund Trussell
1337	John de Seyton	
1343	Sir William Brabazon	
1351	Sir Peter Mallore	
1369	John de Verdon	William de Quenton
1380 (Jan)	John Tyndale	
1382 (Oct)	John Wydeville	John Tyndale
1383 (Feb)	John Wydeville	John Tyndale
1383 (Oct)	John Wydeville	
1384 (Apr)	Roger de la Chamber	John Tyndale
1384 (Nov)	Roger de la Chamber	John Tyndale
1385	Sir Giles Mallore	
1386	Roger de la Chamber	John Tyndale
1388 (Feb)	Sir Giles Mallore	John Wydeville
1388 (Sep)	John Harrowden	John Mulsho
1390 (Jan)	Roger de la Chamber	John Mulsho
1390 (Nov)	John Wydeville	John Mulsho
1391	Roger de la Chamber	Sir Nicholas Lilling
1393	Sir Giles Mallore	John Tyndale
1394	Sir Henry Green	Sir Giles Mallor4
1395	Roger de la Chamber	Robert Chiselden
1397 (Jan)	Sir Henry Green	John Cope
1397 (Sep)	Hugh Northborough	John Mulsho
1399	John Cope	Robert Chiselden
1401	Sir Giles Mallore	John Warwick
1402	Sir Giles Mallore	John Cope
1404 (Jan)	Sir John Trussell	Ralph Parles
1404 (Oct)	Ralph Green	John Cope
1406	Ralph Parles / John Cope	John Warwick
1407	John Tyndale	Thomas Wake
1410	Sir John St. John	Ralph Green
1411	Sir John St. John	William Huddlestone
1413 (Feb)
1413 (May)	Nicholas Merbury	Thomas Wake
1414 (Apr)	Thomas Wydeville	Nicholas Merbury
1414 (Nov)	Sir John Trussell	John Mortimer
1415		
1416 (Mar)	Sir John St. John	William Huddlestone
1416 (Oct)		
1417	Thomas Mulsho	Thomas Wake
1419	Thomas Strange	John Boseno
1420	Sir John Beaufo	Richard Knightley
1421 (May)	Sir John St. John	Thomas Strange
1421 (Dec)	Sir John Knyvet	Simon Kynnesman
1423	William Tresham	Richard Knightley
1425	John Catesby	
1427	William Tresham	
1429	William Tresham	John Catesby
1431	?	
1432	William Tresham	
1433	William Tresham	
1435	William Tresham	
1437	?	
1439	William Tresham	Richard Knightley
1442	William Tresham	
1445	William Tresham	
1447	William Tresham	Henry Green
1449 (Feb)	William Tresham	William Catesby
1449 (Oct)	William Tresham	Thomas Thorpe
1450 (Nov)	Thomas Mulsho	
1453	Sir Thomas Tresham	William Catesby
1459	Sir Thomas Tresham	
1484	William Catesby	
1486	Sir Thomas Lovell	
1491	Richard Empson	Davy Philip
1510–1512	No names known	
1515	?Sir Nicholas Vaux	?
1523		
1529	Sir William Parr	Richard Knightley
1536		
1539	Sir William Parr	Sir Thomas Tresham
1542	Sir Thomas Tresham	Sir William Newenham
1545		
1547	Henry Williams	Sir John Cope
1553 (Mar)	Sir Nicholas Throckmorton	Robert Lane
1553 (Oct)	Sir John Fermor	William Chauncy
1554 (Apr)	Sir Thomas Tresham	Sir John Spencer
1554 (Nov)	Sir Thomas Tresham	William Chauncy
1555	Sir John Fermor	William Chauncy

As there were sometimes significant gaps between Parliaments, the dates of first assembly and dissolution are given for those up to 1640. Where the name of the member has not yet been ascertained or is not recorded in a surviving document, the entry unknown is entered in the table.

Elected	Assembled	Dissolved	First Member	Second Member
1558	20 January 1558	17 November 1558	Sir Walter Mildmay	Sir John Spencer
1559	23 January 1559	8 May 1559	Sir Walter Mildmay	Edward Montagu
1563	11 January 1563	2 January 1567	Sir Walter Mildmay	Sir William Cecil
1571	2 April 1571	29 May 1571	Sir Walter Mildmay	Sir Robert Lane
1572	8 May 1572	19 April 1583	Sir Walter Mildmay	(Sir) Christopher Hatton
1584	23 November 1584	14 September 1585	Sir Walter Mildmay	(Sir) Christopher Hatton
1586	15 October 1586	23 March 1587	Sir Walter Mildmay	(Sir) Christopher Hatton
1588	4 February 1589	29 March 1589	Sir Walter Mildmay	Sir Richard Knightley
1593	18 February 1593	10 April 1593	Sir Thomas Cecil	Christopher Yelverton
1597	24 October 1597	9 February 1598	Sir Thomas Cecil	Sir Richard Knightley
1601	27 October 1601	19 December 1601	Sir John Stanhope	Sir William Lane
1604	19 March 1604	9 February 1611	Sir Valentine Knightley	Sir Edward Montagu
1614	5 April 1614	7 June 1614	Sir William Tate	Sir Edward Montagu
1620	16 January 1621	8 February 1622	Sir William Spencer	Sir Edward Montagu
(1621)	16 January 1621	8 February 1622	Sir William Spencer	Richard Knightley
1624	12 February 1624	27 March 1625	Sir William Spencer	Richard Knightley
1625	17 May 1625	12 August 1625	Sir William Spencer	Richard Knightley
1626	6 February 1626	15 June 1626	Sir William Spencer	Sir John Pickering
1628	17 March 1628	10 March 1629	Francis Nicolls	Richard Knightley
1629–1640	No Parliaments convened			

=== 1640–1832 ===
Election	First member	First party	Second member	Second party
Northamptonshire was represented by 2 elected Knights of the Shire
1640, April	John Crew		Sir Gilbert Pickering, Bt	
1640, November	Sir Gilbert Pickering, Bt	Parliamentarian	Sir John Dryden, Bt	Parliamentarian
Northamptonshire was represented by 2 nominated MPs in Barebones Parliament
1653	Sir Gilbert Pickering, Bt		Thomas Brooke	
Northamptonshire's representation was increased to 6 elected MPs in the First and Second Parliaments of the Protectorate
1654	(1) Sir Gilbert Pickering, Bt		(2) John Crew	
1654	(3) Sir John Norwich, Bt		(4) John Claypole, senior	
1654	(5) Sir John Dryden, Bt		(6) Thomas Brooke	
1656	(1) Sir Gilbert Pickering, Bt		(2) John Claypole	
1656	(3) William Boteler		(4) James Langham	
1656	(5) Thomas Crew		(6) Alexander Blake	
Northamptonshire's representation was decreased to 2 MPs in the Third Parliament of the Protectorate and thereafter
1659, January	Richard Knightley		Philip Holman	
1659, May	Sir Gilbert Pickering, Bt		vacant	
1660, April 22	John Crew		Sir Henry Yelverton, Bt	
21 March 1661	Sir Justinian Isham, 2nd Bt		George Clerke	
29 April 1675	Lord Burghley		George Clerke	
28 February 1678	Miles Fleetwood		George Clerke	
6 February 1679	Sir Roger Norwich, Bt		John Parkhurst	
21 August 1679	Miles Fleetwood		John Parkhurst	
12 May 1685	Sir Roger Norwich, Bt		Edward Montagu	Tory
14 January 1689	Edward Harby	Whig	Edward Montagu	Tory
13 June 1689	Sir Thomas Samwell, Bt		Edward Montagu	Tory
20 February 1690	Sir St Andrew St John, Bt	Whig	John Parkhurst	Whig
14 November 1695	Sir St Andrew St John, Bt	Whig	Thomas Cartwright	Tory
21 July 1698	Sir Justinian Isham, 4th Bt	Tory	John Parkhurst	Whig
4 December 1701	Sir Justinian Isham, 4th Bt	Tory	Thomas Cartwright	Tory
21 May 1730	Sir Justinian Isham, 5th Bt		Thomas Cartwright	Tory
31 March 1737	Sir Edmund Isham, Bt		Thomas Cartwright	Tory
14 April 1748	Sir Edmund Isham, Bt		Valentine Knightley	
26 December 1754	Sir Edmund Isham, Bt		William Cartwright	
31 March 1768	Sir Edmund Isham, Bt		Sir William Dolben, Bt	
14 January 1773	Lucy Knightley		Sir William Dolben, Bt	
18 October 1774	Lucy Knightley		Thomas Powys	
15 April 1784	Sir James Langham, Bt		Thomas Powys	
23 June 1790	Francis Dickins		Thomas Powys	
2 August 1797	Francis Dickins		William Ralph Cartwright	Tory
12 November 1806	Viscount Althorp	Whig	William Ralph Cartwright	Tory
23 May 1831	Viscount Althorp	Whig	Viscount Milton	Whig
Constituency abolished 1832: see North Northamptonshire and South Northamptonshire.

== See also ==
- List of former United Kingdom Parliament constituencies
- Unreformed House of Commons
