= Church of St Mary the Virgin, Fawsley =

Coordinates: 52°12′24″N 1°10′29″W

- Church of St Mary the Virgin
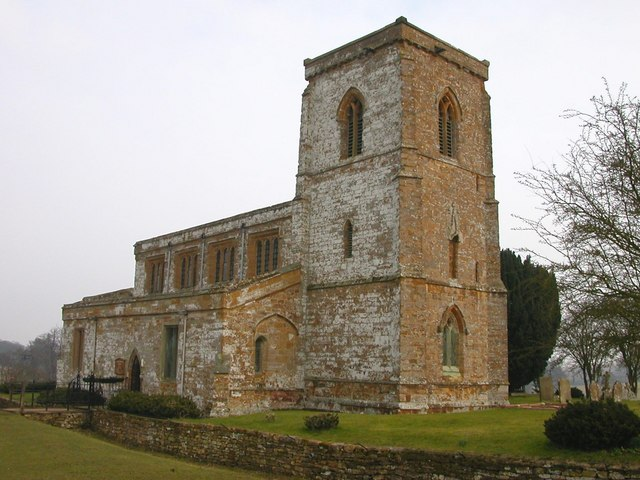
- Church of St Mary the Virgin, Fawsley
- OS grid reference: SP 56537 56792
- Location: Fawsley, Northamptonshire
- Country: England
- Denomination: Anglican

History
- Dedication: Mary, mother of Jesus

Architecture
- Heritage designation: Grade I
- Designated: 1968
- Completed: approximately 1209

Administration
- Province: Canterbury
- Diocese: Peterborough
- Parish: Fawsley

The Church of St Mary the Virgin is a Church of England parish church in Fawsley, Northamptonshire, England. It serves the parish of Fawsley under the jurisdiction of the Diocese of Peterborough. It was built in the 13th century and is a Grade I listed building.

== History ==
The current church dates to the 13th century. It is thought to have been established in 1209 on the site of a wooden Anglo-Saxon church, as a chapel under St John the Baptist Church in Blisworth. This lasted until the Dissolution of the Monasteries when the Knightley family demolished most of the village to enclose land for sheep farming. The church was protected from demolition by the fact that it had had land granted to it to establish a chantry in Bedfordshire. In 1690, the chancel was rebuilt and later, the church had effigies of the Knightley family installed after a number of them were buried in the church. The church was granted Grade I listed status in 1968 and was amended in 1987.

Aided by its isolated location, a considerable amount of the copper covering was stolen from the roofs in 2015, causing some rain damage internally. Fund raising to replace the temporary plastic sheeting is well underway.

=== Tower and bells ===
The tower contains a ring of four bells, which are the oldest ring of four bells that all came from the same foundry at the same time. Casting of the bells is ascribed to W. Chamberlain of London in about 1440. The inscriptions cast on the bells are:

Treble: SANCTE BOTOLFE ORA PRO NOBIS

2. IN MULTIS ANNIS RESONET CAMPANA JOHANNIS

3. SIT NOMEN DOMINI BENDICTUM

Tenor: JOHANNES EST NOMEN EIUS

All four bells also have three identity stamps:

North’s # 18 a cross inscribed in a quarter ihu.merci.ladi.help on an octagonal base

North’s # 19 crossed keys, fish, bell, tea pot, sheaf of corn in the quarters on a shield

North’s # 20 letter m with mast and streamer and sideways “Y” on a shield

All bells retain their cast canons. The timber frame dates from the early 17th century, and was repaired by John Taylor & Co in 1965/6 when the four bells were quarter turned, renovated with new independent crown staples, new fittings for swing chiming consisting of seasoned-elm headstocks, wrought-iron levers, steel gudgeons, fully enclosed ball bearings, clappers with new joints and ball-bearing rollers.

In 1992, the frame was strengthened further by volunteers to a design by Eayre and Smith Ltd to allow for full circle ringing and the necessary additional fittings provided. A service of thanksgiving was held on 26 September 1992.

=== Washington family ===
In 1720, the coat of arms of the Washington family was noted as being carved into the stone outside the entrance, possibly because Reverend Lawrence Washington, the great-great-grandfather of United States President George Washington, owned the estate in the area that included the church. The shield was later hidden behind stones but was rediscovered in 1885 and protected with a glass case. The church also has stained-glass windows bearing the Washington family arms which were removed from Sulgrave Manor, the Washingtons' ancestral home.
