= John Beaufo =

English politician

Sir John Beaufo (died 4 November 1424) was an English politician. He sat as MP for Northamptonshire in 1420.

He was knighted by 18 February 1420.

He married Margaret and had no children.
