= John St. John (MP for Northamptonshire) =

Member of the Parliament of England

Sir John St. John (after 1360 – 26 December 1424), of Paulerspury, Northamptonshire and Fonmon, Glamorgan, was a politician.

He was a Member (MP) of the Parliament of England for Northamptonshire in 1410, 1411, March 1416 and May 1421.
