= Fawsley =

Hamlet in Northamptonshire, England

Coordinates: 52.206600°N 1.181500°W

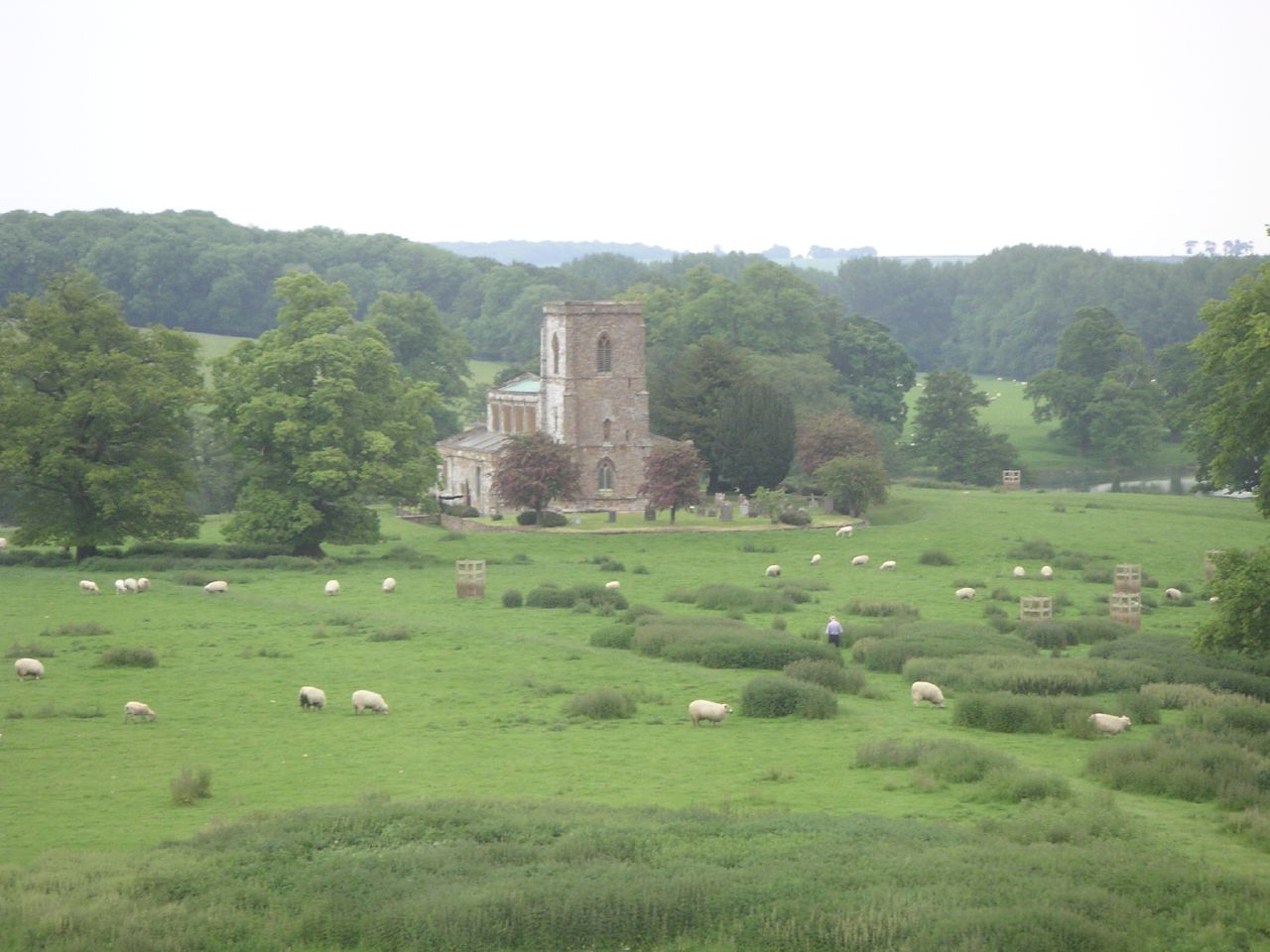
- St Mary's Church, viewed from Fawsley Hall

- Location within Northamptonshire
- OS grid reference: SP5657
- Unitary authority: West Northamptonshire
- Ceremonial county: Northamptonshire
- Region: East Midlands
- Country: England
- Sovereign state: United Kingdom
- Post town: Daventry
- Postcode district: NN11
- Dialling code: 01327
- Police: Northamptonshire
- Fire: Northamptonshire
- Ambulance: East Midlands
- UK Parliament: Daventry

Fawsley is a hamlet and civil parish in West Northamptonshire, England. The population at the 2001 census was 32. At the 2011 census the population remained less than 100 and is included in the civil parish of Charwelton.

The hamlet's name possibly means 'fallow deer wood/clearing' or 'fallow-coloured wood/clearing'. It was created out of the combination of the 'Egelweardesle' and 'Grauesende' Hundreds in the 12th century. According to Morton, the hundred-court was held under a beech-tree called Mangrave (perhaps a combination of '(ge)maene' and 'graf').

The Domesday Book of 1086 confirms the population of Fawsley (Falelau) as around 50, but the Knightley family of Fawsley Hall developed sheep farming at the expense of their peasant tenants, who were all evicted by the turn of the 15th century. The hall and the church are all that remain of Fawsley.

== Fawsley Hall ==
Fawsley Hall and landscape park was created by the Knightley family. Richard Knightley, a well-to-do Staffordshire lawyer, bought the manor of Fawsley in 1416. His grandson Richard, knighted by Henry VII, built the first wing of the present house.

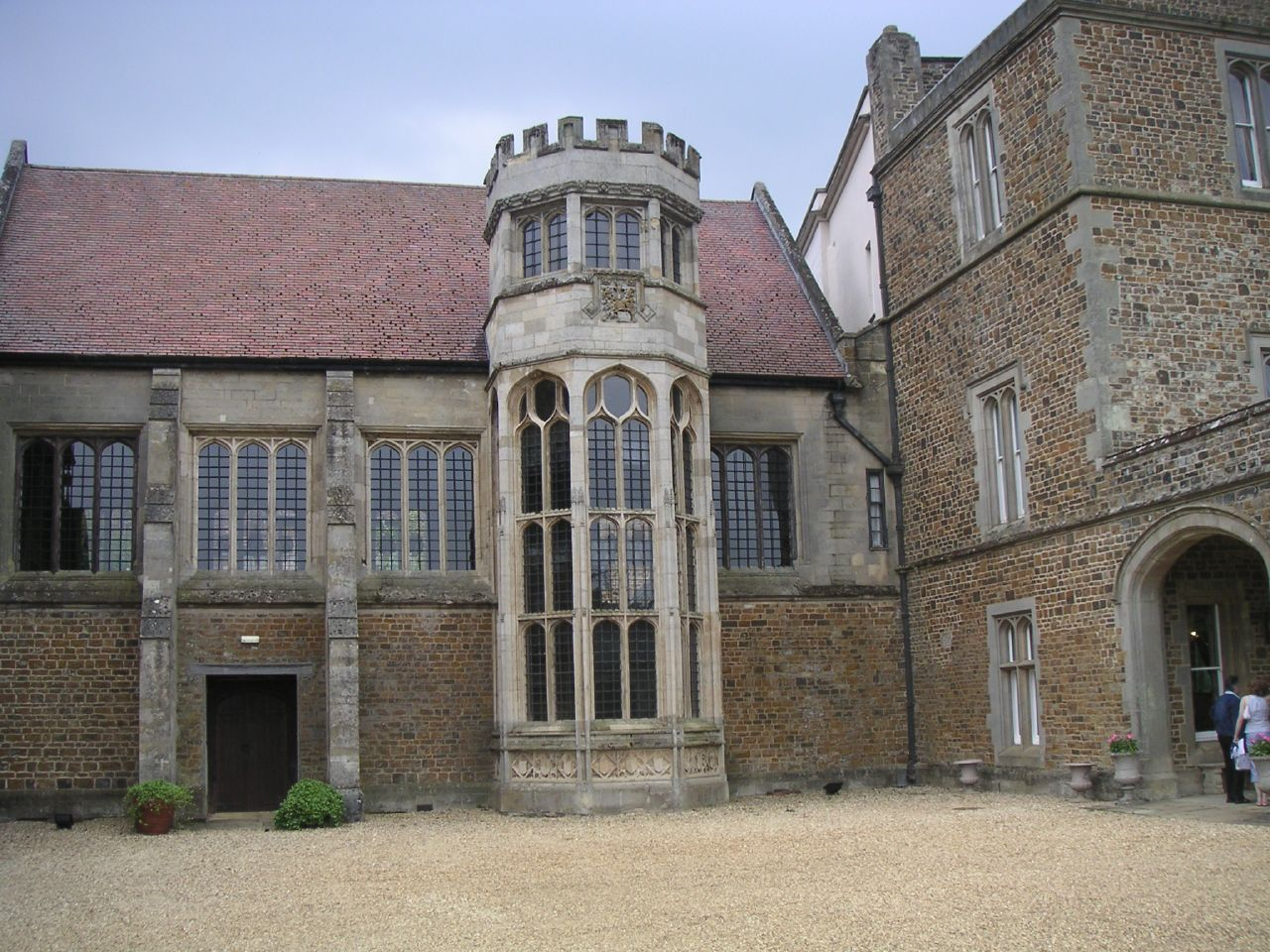
Interior courtyard of Fawsley Hall

Sir Richard's son, Sir Edmund Knightley, was a commissioner concerned with the confiscation of monastic lands after the dissolution of the monasteries. King Henry VIII granted the manors of Badby and Newnham in 1542 to Sir Edmund Knightley and his wife Ursula and their heirs in exchange for Alderton and Stoke. Sir Edmund ordered the building of the Elizabethan hall, which was visited by Elizabeth I in 1575, after it had passed to Edmund's nephew, Richard Knightley, a prominent Puritan. He ran a secret printing press at the house on which were printed Puritan pamphlets and for which he was briefly imprisoned.

The dower house in Fawsley Park, last inhabited in 1704 and now in ruins, was built for Lady Ursula after Sir Edmund died. It was placed on the Heritage at Risk register by English Heritage in 2014. Major stabilisation of the ruins was undertaken during 2016, including the construction of a steel support for the northeastern gable. The Fawsley Estate has also been working with English Heritage and Natural England to prepare a comprehensive scheme of historic landscape restoration.

The estate descended in the wider Knightley family, many of them Members of Parliament, to Lucy Knightley, who inherited in 1754 and built the Georgian wing of Fawsley Hall. Lucy Knightley was High Sheriff of Northamptonshire for 1770–71.

In 1798 Sir John Knightley was created a Baronet. His nephew, Sir Charles Knightley, 2nd Baronet, carried out the Gothic alterations to the Georgian Wing, and his son Sir Rainald, the 3rd Baronet, commissioned architect Anthony Salvin to re-model the North Wing. Sir Rainald married Louisa Knightley and served as MP for South Northamptonshire for 40 years. He was created Baron Knightley in 1892 but died childless in 1895. During this time Joseph Merrick (the 'Elephant Man') was invited by the family to holiday at the estate and lived in the gamekeeper's cottage. Sir Rainald's widow kept possession of the hall until 1913, after which financial restraints necessitated the auction of the house's contents after her death. She was the last Knightley to live at the Hall, completing 500 years of Knightley occupation.

When her eventual heirs Sir Charles Valentine Knightley, 5th Baronet died in 1932 and his brother, Sir Henry Francis Knightley, 6th and last Baronet, died in 1938, the estate passed to the Gage family of Firle Place, East Sussex, by virtue of an earlier marriage of Sir Rainald's sister, Sophia, to Viscount Gage.

Fawsley Hall is now a country house hotel and spa, owned by Hand Picked Hotels. It is one of two buildings in Fawsley listed as Grade I, the other being St Mary's Church. There are three bodies of water near the hotel named Big Waters, The Canal and Horse Pond, the first of which was created using a small dam.

== St Mary's church ==
Standing isolated on a grassy knoll and surrounded by a ha-ha, St. Mary's Church contains the Knightley family tombs including effigies of the 16th-century Sir Richard Knightley and his wife Jane. Dating to the early 13th century, the church has many fine features such as carved poppy heads and stained glass thought to be from Sulgrave Manor. A considerable amount of the copper roof covering was stolen in 2015, and temporary sheeting had to be applied whilst considerable funds are amassed to replace the metal.

== See also ==
- Knightley Baronets
