= Lord Lieutenant of Northamptonshire =

Civil post in Northamptonshire, England

Below is a list of people who have served as Lord Lieutenant of Northamptonshire. Since 1735, all Lords Lieutenant have also been Custos Rotulorum of Northamptonshire. The lieutenancy included the Soke of Peterborough until 1965, when the Lord Lieutenant of Huntingdonshire became Lord Lieutenant of Huntingdon and Peterborough. This merged with the lieutenancy of Cambridgeshire and Isle of Ely in 1974, forming the jurisdiction of the present Lord Lieutenant of Cambridgeshire.

== Lord Lieutenants ==
- William Parr, 1st Marquess of Northampton, 1549 –
- Sir Christopher Hatton, 1586 – 20 November 1591.
- vacant
- Thomas Cecil, 1st Earl of Exeter, 8 September 1603 – 8 February 1623.
- William Cecil, 2nd Earl of Exeter, 27 February 1623 – 6 July 1640.
- John Mordaunt, 1st Earl of Peterborough, 16 July 1640 – 18 June 1643.
- Interregnum
- John Cecil, 4th Earl of Exeter, 31 July 1660 – 8 August 1673 jointly with
- Mildmay Fane, 2nd Earl of Westmorland, 31 July 1660 – 12 February 1666 and
- Henry Mordaunt, 2nd Earl of Peterborough, 21 May 1666 – 8 August 1673.
- divided into East and West Northamptonshire 8 August 1673 – 20 February 1678:
  - John Cecil, 4th Earl of Exeter, (East Northamptonshire).
  - Henry Mordaunt, 2nd Earl of Peterborough, (West Northamptonshire).
- Henry Mordaunt, 2nd Earl of Peterborough, 20 February 1678 – 30 May 1689.
- Charles Mordaunt, 1st Earl of Monmouth, 30 May 1689 – 21 July 1715.
- John Montagu, 2nd Duke of Montagu, 21 July 1715 – 5 July 1749.
- George Montagu-Dunk, 2nd Earl of Halifax, 2 October 1749 – 8 June 1771.
- Spencer Compton, 8th Earl of Northampton, 6 July 1771 – 7 April 1796.
- Charles Compton, 1st Marquess of Northampton, 11 June 1796 – 24 May 1828.
- John Fane, 10th Earl of Westmorland, 5 July 1828 – 15 December 1841.
- Brownlow Cecil, 2nd Marquess of Exeter, 22 January 1842 – 16 January 1867.
- Charles FitzRoy, 3rd Baron Southampton, 22 February 1867 – 16 July 1872.
- John Spencer, 5th Earl Spencer, 12 August 1872 – 27 October 1908.
- Charles Spencer, 6th Earl Spencer, 27 October 1908 – 26 September 1922.
- William Cecil, 5th Marquess of Exeter, 14 December 1922 – 11 March 1952.
- Albert Spencer, 7th Earl Spencer, 11 March 1952 – 31 July 1967.
- Lt. Col. John Chandos-Pole, 31 July 1967 – 5 March 1984.
- Sir John Luke Lowther, 5 March 1984 – 18 November 1998.
- Lady Juliet Townsend, 18 November 1998 – 16 June 2014.
- David Eric Laing, 17 June 2014 – 30 March 2020.
- James Saunders Watson, 30 March 2020 – present

== Deputy lieutenants ==
Deputy lieutenants traditionally supported the Lord-Lieutenant. There could be several deputy lieutenants at any time, depending on the population of the county. Their appointment did not terminate with the changing of the Lord-Lieutenant, but they often retired at age 75.

=== 18th century ===
- John, Earl of Westmorland, 18 February 1793.
- William, Earl Fitzwilliam, 18 February 1793.
- John, Earl of Pomfret, 18 February 1793.
- George John, Earl Spencer, 18 February 1793.
- John Joshua, Earl Carysfort, of the Kingdom of Ireland, 18 February 1793.
- George, Lord Carbery of the Kingdom of Ireland, 18 February 1793.
- Charles Compton, 18 February 1793.
- Sir William Wake, of Courteenhall, 18 February 1793.
- Sir Justinian Isham, 7th Baronet, of Lamport, 18 February 1793.
- Sir Robert Gunning, 1st Baronet, of Horton, 18 February 1793.
- George Ashby, of Haselbech, 18 February 1793.
- George Arnold, of Ashby St Ledgers, 18 February 1793.
- Edward Bouverie the younger, of Delapré Abbey, 18 February 1793.
- Leonard Burton, of Ringstead, 18 February 1793.
- Samuel Blencowe, of Marston St. Lawrence, 18 February 1793.
- Thomas Beet, of Great Houghton, 18 February 1793.
- Richard Booth, of Glendon, 18 February 1793.
- William Ralph Cartwright, of Aynhoe, 18 February 1793.
- John Clarke, of Welton, 18 February 1793.
- John Clarke, of Bulwick, 18 February 1793.
- Francis Dickins, of Wollaston, 18 February 1793.
- John Dryden, of Canons Ashby, 18 February 1793.
- Peter Denys, of Easton Neston, 18 February 1793.
- John Peach Hungerford, of Dingley Hall, 18 February 1793.
- Thomas Hunt, of Oundle, 18 February 1793.
- Robert Henson, of Bainton, 18 February 1793.
- Samuel Isted, of Ecton, 18 February 1793.
- Valentine Knightley, of Fawsley, 18 February 1793.
- Richard Kerby, of Floore, 18 February 1793.
- Thomas Langton, of Teeton, 18 February 1793.
- Thomas Mercer, of Hackleton, 18 February 1793.
- Charles Newman, of Preston Deanery, 18 February 1793.
- John Payne, of Welford, 18 February 1793.
- Nicolls Raynsford, of Brixworth, 18 February 1793.
- Thomas Rokeby, of Arthingworth, 18 February 1793.
- George Robinson, of Cranford, 18 February 1793.
- William Sawbridge, of East Haddon, 18 February 1793.
- Richard Brook Supple, of Great Oakley, 18 February 1793.
- Thomas Samwell Watson Samwell, of Upton Hall, 18 February 1793.
- Thomas Tryon, of Balwick, 18 February 1793.
- John Freke Willes, of Astrop, 18 February 1793.
- William Walcot the younger, of Oundle, 18 February 1793.
- William Zouth Lucas Ward, of Guilsborough, 18 February 1793.
- Allen Edward Young, of Orlingbury, 18 February 1793.
- Lewis Thomas Watson, of Rockingham Castle, 18 February 1793.

=== 19th century ===
- Henry, Duke of Buccleugh, 9 May 1803.
- Thomas, Lord Lilford, 9 May 1803.
- George Henry Fitzroy, Earl of Euston, 9 May 1803.
- Charles William Montagu Scot, Earl of Dalkeith, 9 May 1803.
- John Fane, Lord Burghersh, 9 May 1803.
- Sir Edward Dryden, 9 May 1803.
- Thomas Carter, 9 May 1803.
- Justinian Isham, 9 May 1803.
- John English Dolben, 9 May 1803.
- Charles Knightley, 9 May 1803.
- William Hanbury, jun., 9 May 1803.
- Robert Andrew, jun., 9 May 1803.
- William Somerset Dolben, 9 May 1803.
- John Kipling, 9 May 1803.
- John Plomer Clarke, 9 May 1803.
- Thomas Grant, 9 May 1803.
- John Capell Rose, 1 June 1803.
- John Charles Spencer, Viscount Althorp, 5 June 1803.
- George Francis Lynn, 25 July 1803.
- Matthew Easton Jones, 1 August 1803.
- George Biggin, 17 August 1803.
- William FitzRoy, 6th Duke of Grafton, 29 May 1846.
- Richard Temple-Nugent-Brydges-Chandos-Grenville, 3rd Duke of Buckingham and Chandos, 29 May 1846.
- Earl of Pomfret, 29 May 1846.
- Anthony Henley, 3rd Baron Henley, 29 May 1846.
- Richard Watson, 29 May 1846.
- William Bruce Stopford, 29 May 1846.
- William Cartwright, 29 May 1846.
- Rainald Knightley, 29 May 1846.
- John Michael Severne, 29 May 1846.
- Richard Aubrey Cartwright, 29 May 1846.
- William Willes, 29 May 1846.
- George Payne, 29 May 1846.
- William Smyth, 29 May 1846.
- Henry Neville, 29 May 1846.
- George Ashby Ashby, 17 January 1861.
- Lieutenant-General Charles George James Arbuthnot, 21 January 1861.

=== 20th century ===
- James Griffith Dearden, 28 February 1901.
- Edward Algernon FitzRoy, 9 May 1901.
- James Hornsby, 27 May 1902.
- Sir Charles Valentine Knightley, 27 May 1902.
- Henry James, Earl of Euston, 22 August 1907.
- Luke, Baron Annaly, 22 August 1907.
- Colonel Joseph Hill, 22 August 1907.
- Christopher Smyth, 9 August 1911.
- Lieutenant-Colonel John Brown, 30 December 1918.
- Lieutenant-Colonel Frederick Willoughby, 30 December 1918.
- Lieutenant-Colonel George Somes Eunson, 30 December 1918.
- Thomas Henry Woolston, 30 December 1918.
- John Powys, 5th Baron Lilford, 29 July 1922.
- Edward Douglas-Pennant, 3rd Baron Penrhyn, 29 July 1922.
- Lieutenant-Colonel Sir Hereward Wake, 29 July 1922.
- Major Sir Charles Vere Gunning, 29 July 1922.
- Lieutenant-Colonel Sir Charles Lowther, 4th Baronet, 29 July 1922.
- Sir William Ryland Dent Adkins, 29 July 1922.
- Major Henry Brassey, 1st Baron Brassey of Apethorpe, 29 July 1922.
- Colonel Henry Wickham, 29 July 1922.
- Sir Arthur Richard de Capell Brooke, 18 October 1923.
- William Harvey Reeves, 22 June 1931.
- Samuel Smith Campion, 9 April 1935.
- Captain John Veasy Collier, 9 April 1935.
- Colonel Charles Henry Eyre Coote, 9 April 1935.
- Brigadier-General Algernon Francis Holford Ferguson, 9 April 1935.
- Major (Brevet Lieutenant-Colonel) James William Fisher, 9 April 1935.
- Colonel Albert Edward John, Earl Spencer, 9 April 1935.
- Frederick Bostock, 20 May 1937.
- Lieutenant David George Brownlow Cecil, 20 May 1937.
- Leslie Winter Dryland, 20 May 1937.
- Major David Howard Evans, 20 May 1937.
- George Lewis, 20 May 1937.
- Colonel William Compton, 6th Marquess of Northampton, 20 May 1937.
- Lieutenant-Colonel Richard Montague Raynsford, 20 May 1937.
- Brigadier-General William Strong, 20 May 1937.
- Lieutenant-Colonel Josiah Walker, 20 May 1937.
- Major Frederick Fermor-Hesketh, 2nd Baron Hesketh, 2 January 1950.
- Lieutenant-Colonel Marcus Jelley, 2 January 1950.
- Rear Admiral Sir Wellwood George Courtenay Maxwell, 2 January 1950.
- Lieutenant-Colonel Orfeur Kilvington Parker, 2 January 1950.
- Major-General (Honorary Lieutenant-General) Sir Bertram Norman Sergison-Brooke, 23 June 1952.
- Lieutenant-Colonel Malcolm Berwick, 23 June 1952.
- Lieutenant-Colonel John Thomas Herbert Pettit, 23 June 1952.
- Lieutenant-Colonel Edgar Claude Manning Palmer, 23 June 1952.
- Major Sir Gyles Isham, 12th Baronet, 23 June 1952.
- Captain Sir Arthur John Edward Craig, 23 June 1952.
- Colonel (Honorary Major-General) Evelyn Dalrymple Fanshawe, 29 May 1961.
- Lieutenant-Colonel Ronald King McMichael, 29 May 1961.
- Lieutenant-Colonel James Thomas Lewis, 29 May 1961.
- Major Peter Esme Brassey, 29 May 1961 — 9 May 1967.
- Captain John Spencer, 8th Earl Spencer, 29 May 1961.
- Major George Theodore Herbert Capron, 30 June 1965.
- Lieutenant-Colonel John Chandos-Pole, 30 June 1965.
- Major Richard Arthur Collins, 30 June 1965.
- Major Dennis Douglas Pilkington Smyly, 30 June 1965.
- Captain Thomas Patrick Douglas Spens, 30 June 1965 — 25 August 1967.
- Major Nigel Victor Stopford-Sackville, 30 June 1965.
- Major Reginald Manningham-Buller, 1st Viscount Dilhorne, 17 May 1967.
- Dennis Edmund Hutchinson, 17 May 1967.
- Major Robert Charles Jeffery, 17 May 1967.
- Colonel Percy Fergus Ivo Reid, 27 March 1969.
- Edwin Arthur Steele, 27 March 1969.
- Colonel Doidge Estcourt Taunton, 27 March 1969.
- Major Sir Hereward Wake, 27 March 1969.
- Major David Henry, Lord Brassey of Apethorpe, 2 October 1972.
- Flight Lieutenant Guy Timothy Geoffrey Conant, 2 October 1972.
- Captain Sir Edward William Spencer Ford, 2 October 1972.
- Lieutenant-Commander Arnold Derek Arthur Lawson, 2 October 1972.
- Lieutenant-Colonel Charles John Manning Watts, 2 October 1972.
- Captain Antony Edward Montague Raynsford, 11 February 1974.
- Lieutenant-Colonel Anthony Vere Cyprian Robarts, 11 February 1974.
- Major Sir Derek Wilbraham Pritchard, 11 February 1974.
- Major Derek Frank Hooton, 11 February 1974.
- Captain Owen Meurig Jones, 11 February 1974.
- Major Donald Baxter, 17 May 1977.
- Lieutenant Colonel Thomas Gray Boardman, 17 May 1977.
- Edmund Crispin Stephen James George Brudenell, 17 May 1977.
- Brigadier Hugh Gray Wybrants Hamilton, 17 May 1977.
- Captain John Luke Lowther, 17 May 1977.
- Captain Richard Augustus Palmer,17 May 1977.
- Flight Lieutenant Kenneth Raymond Pearson, 17 May 1977.
- Countess of Birkenhead, 3 December 1979.
- Christian Mary, Lady Hesketh, 3 December 1979.
- Major Joseph Mark Fearfield, 3 December 1979.
- Spencer Compton, 7th Marquess of Northampton, 3 December 1979.
- Captain John Macdonald-Buchanan, 3 December 1979.
- Commander Leslie Michael Macdonald Saunders Watson, Royal Navy, 3 December 1979.
- Jean Jackson-Stops, 11 February 1985.
- Colonel Richard Antony Gill, 31 January 1986.
- Cyril Humphrey Cripps, 31 January 1986.
- Michael Leslie Dove, 17 June 1989.
- William David Morton, 17 June 1989.
- Anita Mary Tasker, 17 June 1989.
- William Richard Frank Chamberlain, 9 February 1991.
- Penelope Joan Escombe, 9 February 1991.
- Lady Juliet Margaret Townsend, 9 February 1991.
- John Walter Douglas Ewart, 1 February 1993.
- James George Kane, 1 February 1993.
- Joan Mary Tice, 1 February 1993.
- Christopher Guy Vere Davidge, 14 March 1994.
- Anthony Geoffrey Stoughton-Harris, 14 March 1994.
- Richard Paul Seddon, 25 March 1996.
- Arthur Jeffrey Greenwell, 25 September 1996.
- Lady Wake, 25 September 1996.
- Ian Robert Keers, 24 November 1997.
- Agnes Anne Goodman, 24 November 1997.
- Rear Admiral John Patrick Bruce O'Riordan, 24 November 1997.
- John George Church, 24 November 1997.

== See also ==
- High Sheriff of Northamptonshire
