= William Ralph Cartwright =

British politician

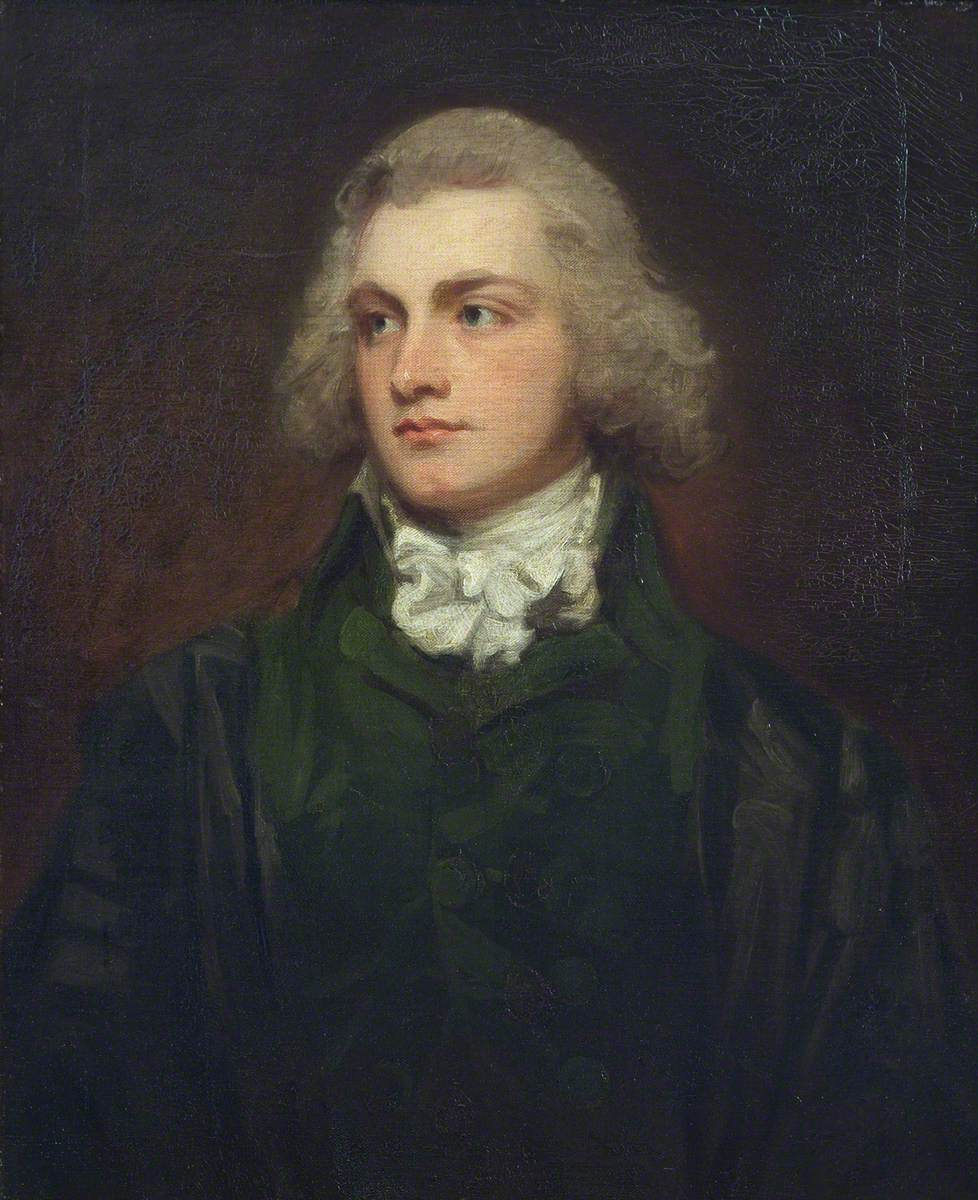
Ralph William Cartwright, painting by George Romney, 1788-1790.

William Ralph Cartwright (30 March 1771 – 4 January 1847) was an English landowner and Tory politician who sat in the House of Commons between 1797 and 1846.

== Life ==
Cartwright was the son of Thomas Cartwright of Aynhoe Park and his wife Mary Catherine Desaguilliers. In 1793 a highwayman was transported for robbing him of £32 10s worth of goods and money.

In 1797 on the retirement of Thomas Powys, he was elected Member of Parliament for Northamptonshire. He held the seat until 1831. In the 1832 general election he was elected MP for South Northamptonshire and held the seat until he resigned in 1846.

Cartwright was lieutenant-colonel in the local militia during the Napoleonic wars, and was responsible for the Brackley Battalion. In the time of agricultural depression and increasing population, Cartwright helped settle many dozens of his surplus agricultural labourers in Wellington County, Ontario from the late 1820s until his death. He ran up huge debts, mainly from playing the stock market, which he did unsuccessfully.

== Family ==
Cartwright married Hon. Emma Mary Maude daughter of Viscount Hawarden on 12 April 1794. They had children Thomas who became a diplomat and William who became a lieutenant general. These had respectively sons William Cornwallis Cartwright and Fairfax Cartwright who were both MPs. Cartwright's wife died in 1808 and he married again on 29 May 1810 to Julia Frances Aubrey, with whom he had five children including Henry Cartwright.

Parliament of Great Britain
| Preceded by Thomas Powys; Francis Dickins | Member of Parliament for Northamptonshire; 1797–1801; With: Francis Dickins 1797–1801 | Succeeded by Parliament of the United Kingdom |
Parliament of the United Kingdom
| Preceded by Parliament of Great Britain | Member of Parliament for Northamptonshire; 1801–1831; With: Francis Dickins 1801–1806; Viscount Althorp 1806–1831 | Succeeded by Viscount Althorp; Viscount Milton |
| Preceded by see Northamptonshire constituency | Member for South Northamptonshire; 1832–1846; With: Viscount Althorp 1832–1835; Sir Charles Knightley 1835–1846 | Succeeded by Sir Charles Knightley; Richard Vyse |
