= Dilhorne Hall =

Country house in Dilhorne, Staffordshire, United Kingdom

Coordinates: 52.9885°N 2.0418°W

Dilhorne Hall located in Dilhorne, Staffordshire, England, was the ancestral home of the Buller family.

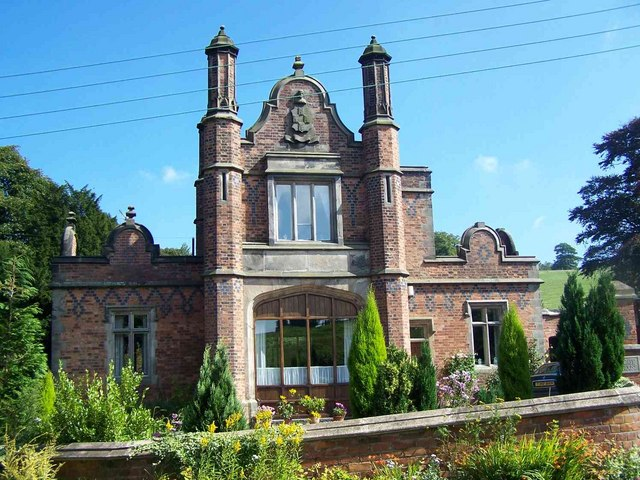
The gatehouse of Dilhorne Hall which is the only part of the Hall remaining

== History ==
The Hall occupied an area of approximately four acres but was demolished in the 1920s. Dilhorne Hall was rebuilt in about 1830 by the Buller family. It succeeded a 17th-century house that had been the home of Copwood Hollins (who died in 1705) and, in the later 18th century, John Holliday.

In the early 1980s Dilhorne Recreational Institute had been built on the site of the demolished Hall. The grounds of the former hall are now a park, playground and Crown green bowling club. It is also the site of Dilhorne Village Hall, a venue for events both private and organised by the village hall committee as a self funding charity. Classes, such as Yoga, Salsa and Art are also run regularly. The old gatehouse to Dilhorne Hall still stands at the entrance to the park and has been renovated to become a private house.

== Buller Family ==
The Buller family were noted in the legal profession in London during the 19th century. The Baronetcy of Dilhorne in the County of Stafford was created in the Baronetage of the United Kingdom on 20 January 1866 for Edward Manningham-Buller.

In 1962 Reginald Manningham-Buller, the fourth Baronet of Dilhorne, who did not inherit the Dilhorne estate, took the title Baron Dilhorne, of Towcester in the County of Northampton. He was subsequently made a Viscount. The former head of the Security Service (MI5) Eliza Manningham-Buller, Baroness Manningham-Buller is his daughter.
