= Charlotte Spencer =

Charlotte Spencer may refer to:

- Charlotte Spencer, Countess Spencer (1835–1903), wife of the 5th Earl Spencer
- Charlotte Spencer (actress), British actress
