= General Cartwright =

General Cartwright may refer to:

- James Cartwright (born 1949), U.S. Marine Corps four-star general
- Roscoe Cartwright (1919–1974), U.S. Army brigadier general
- William Cartwright (British Army officer, died 1827) (c. 1754–1827), British Army general
- William Cartwright (British Army officer, died 1873) (1797–1873), British Army general
- Malcolm Cartwright-Taylor (1911–1969), Royal Marines general
