= Henry Cartwright =

British politician

Member of Parliament for South Northamptonshire
- In office 20 February 1858 – 15 November 1868 Serving with Rainald Knightley
- Preceded by: John Spencer; Rainald Knightley
- Succeeded by: Rainald Knightley; Fairfax Cartwright

Personal details
- Born: 1 September 1814 Aynhoe Park, Aynho, Northamptonshire
- Died: 26 July 1890 (aged 75) Eydon Hall, Eydon, Northamptonshire
- Party: Conservative
- Spouse: Jane Holbech (m. 1853)
- Parent(s): William Ralph Cartwright; Julia Frances Aubrey
- Education: Eton College

Henry Cartwright (1 September 1814 – 26 July 1890) was a British Conservative Party politician.

Cartwright was the second of five children of former Northamptonshire and South Northamptonshire Tory and Conservative MP William Ralph Cartwright and Julia Frances Aubrey, daughter of Richard Aubrey. He married Jane Holbech, daughter of former Banbury MP William Holbech, in 1853 at Farnborough in Warwickshire.

After education at Eton College, Cartwright first joined the army as an ensign in the Grenadier Guards in 1832, rising to captain in 1846, and colonel in 1854. He sold out in 1857.

Cartwright followed his father into politics when he was elected MP for South Northamptonshire at a by-election in 1858. He held the seat until he stood down in 1868.

Parliament of the United Kingdom
Preceded by John Spencer; Rainald Knightley	Member of Parliament for South Northamptonshire; 1858–1868; With: Rainald Knightley	Succeeded by Rainald Knightley; Fairfax Cartwright
