= Eydon Hall =

Building in Northamptonshire, England

Coordinates: 52°08′37″N 1°12′46″W

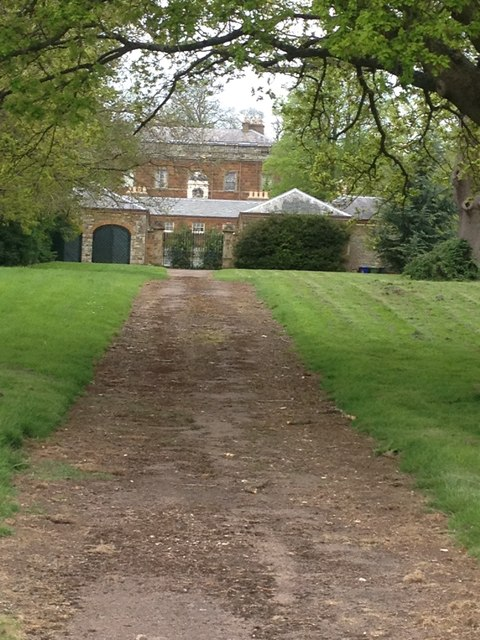
Path to the hall

Eydon Hall is a Palladian stately home near the village of Eydon, in Northamptonshire. It is a Grade I listed building, and is currently in use as a private residence.

== Architecture ==
The house, built of ironstone, remains broadly as it was originally designed, with nine bedrooms and four major reception rooms across two main floors. The top floor, with servants' quarters, is hidden from view by balustrades around the side of the roof, and there is a large basement. The house has a number of unusual features, perhaps the most interesting being that the large portico traditional on such houses is placed at the rear, not the front. Each of the four facades are designed differently, with the west facade having a large semi-circular bow in it to contain an oval drawing room.

== History ==
The site was originally occupied by Eydon Lodge, which was acquired in 1788 for £6,600 by the Reverend Francis Annesley. He demolished the existing building, and employed James Lewis to create the replacement, completed in 1789.

Eydon Hall was later owned by Colonel Henry Cartwright, member of parliament for South Northamptonshire from 1858 to 1868, who died there in 1890. In 1913 it was taken by Lady Fermor-Hesketh and after that purchased in 1923 by David Margesson. By 1927 it was occupied by W. G. Waldron, and in 1929 was again announced for sale.

The buyer was Robert Brand (later Lord Brand); the house passed to his daughter on his death in 1963. In 1982 it returned to the market, and was eventually purchased by the Thoroughbred racehorse owner/breeder Gerald W. Leigh. After his death, when his widow chose to sell the estate, it returned to the market in 2004 with an estimated price of around £11m. Much to the surprise of the property industry, it sold within two months to video game developer Chris Stamper for £17m.
