= Fairfax Cartwright =

Fairfax Cartwright may refer to:

- Fairfax Leighton Cartwright (1857–1928), British diplomat, ambassador to the Austro-Hungarian Empire before World War I
- Fairfax William Cartwright (1823–1881), British Conservative politician
