= John Holliday (barrister) =

English lawyer and author

John Holliday (c.1730–1801) was an English lawyer and author, a Fellow of the Royal Society from 1786.

== Life ==
Holliday was admitted a student of Lincoln's Inn on 5 May 1759 and was called to the bar on 23 April 1771. He had an extensive practice as a conveyancer.

Holliday was an active member of the Society of Arts, and was elected Fellow of the Royal Society 9 March 1786. He died at his house in Great Ormonde Street, London, on 9 March 1801, aged 71.

== Works ==
Holliday published:

- The Life of Lord Mansfield, 1797.
- Monody on the Death of a Friend, anon., 1798, for Thomas Gilbert of Cotton MP.
- The British Oak, a Poem, dedicated to Horatio, Lord Nelson, in grateful remembrance of his Lordship's signal Victory near the mouth of the Nile, anon., London, 1800.

He published a memoir of Owen Salusbury Brereton in the Transactions of the Society of Arts; and left in manuscript a verse translation of the first eight books of the Aeneid, and a collection of conveyancing precedents.

== Family ==
Holliday married Elizabeth Harrison, the daughter of the widow Elizabeth Harrison of Dilhorne Hall, Staffordshire. They had an only child Eliza Lydia, who married on 2 June 1791 Francis Buller-Yarde MP, and died on 1 November 1851, aged 77.
