= William Vansittart =

British Conservative Party and Liberal Party politician

Member of Parliament for Windsor
- In office 27 March 1857 – 12 July 1865 Serving with Richard Vyse (1863–1865); George William Hope (1859–1863); Charles Grenfell (1857–1859)
- Preceded by: Samson Ricardo; Charles Grenfell
- Succeeded by: Henry Hoare; Henry Labouchère

Personal details
- Born: 2 May 1813 Bhaugulpore
- Died: 15 January 1878 (aged 64)
- Party: Conservative
- Other political affiliations: Liberal
- Spouse(s): Melanie Jenkins (m. 1866) Henrietta Humphreys (m. 1847; died 1852) Emily Leslie-Anstruther (m. 1839; died 1844)
- Children: Four
- Parent(s): Arthur Vansittart; Caroline Eden

William Vansittart (2 May 1813 – 15 January 1878) was a British Conservative Party and Liberal Party politician.

Born in 1813, Vansittart was the son of Arthur and Caroline (née Eden) Vansittart. In 1839, he married Emily, daughter of Robert Leslie-Anstruther, and they had two children, Emily Eden (born 21 April 1840, Bhaugulpore, died 27 May 1905) and William Henry (born 1844), before she died in 1844 on return from India. He then remarried to Harriette, daughter of Ambrose Humphrys, on 2 December 1847, and they had one child, Caroline Bretha (died 1919), before she also died in 1852. Thirdly, in 1866, he married Melanie, daughter of Sir Richard Jenkins, and they had a son: Charles Edward Bexley (born 1867)

A liberal-conservative in politics, Vansittart was elected Conservative Party MP for Windsor at the 1857 general election and held the seat until 1865 when he sought re-election as a Liberal Party candidate, but failed.

He was also part of the Honourable East India Company and a Deputy Lieutenant.

He died in January 1878 from shock after receiving burns to his arm when a lint used to dress a wound to his arm caught fire.

Parliament of the United Kingdom
| Preceded by Samson Ricardo; Charles Grenfell | Member of Parliament for Windsor; 1857–1865; With: Richard Vyse (1863–1865); George William Hope (1859–1863); Charles Grenfell (1857–1859) | Succeeded by Henry Hoare; Henry Labouchère |
