= Richard Howard-Vyse (MP) =

British politician (1813–1872)

Richard Henry Howard-Vyse

Member of Parliament for Windsor
- In office 4 November 1863 – 12 July 1865 Serving with William Vansittart
- Preceded by: William Vansittart; George William Hope
- Succeeded by: Henry Hoare; Henry Labouchère

Member of Parliament for South Northamptonshire
- In office 24 February 1846 – 6 April 1857 Serving with Rainald Knightley (1852–1857); Charles Knightley (1846–1852)
- Preceded by: Charles Knightley; William Ralph Cartwright
- Succeeded by: Rainald Knightley; John Spencer

Personal details
- Born: 24 August 1813
- Died: 12 June 1872 (aged 58)
- Party: Conservative
- Spouse: Julia Agnes Jolliffe (m. 1856)
- Parent: Howard Vyse

Richard Henry Richard Howard-Vyse (24 August 1813 – 12 June 1872) was a British Conservative Party politician.

Born in 1813, Howard-Vyse was the son of Howard Vyse. In 1856, he married Julia Agnes Jolliffe, daughter of William Joliffe and Eleanor (née Paget) Jolliffe, and they had at least one son: Howard Henry Howard-Vyse (1858–1927).

Howard-Vyse was elected Conservative MP for South Northamptonshire at a by-election in 1846—caused by the resignation of William Ralph Cartwright—and held the seat until 1857 when he was defeated. He later returned to Parliament for Windsor at a by-election in 1863—caused by the death of George William Hope—but lost the seat at the next general election in 1865.

Howard-Vyse was also a Justice of the Peace and a colonel in the Royal Horse Guards.

Parliament of the United Kingdom
Preceded by William Vansittart; George William Hope	Member of Parliament for Windsor; 1863–1865; With: William Vansittart	Succeeded by Henry Hoare; Henry Labouchère
Preceded by Charles Knightley; William Ralph Cartwright	Member of Parliament for South Northamptonshire; 1846–1857; With: Rainald Knightley (1852–1857); Charles Knightley (1846–1852)	Succeeded by Rainald Knightley; John Spencer
