= 1962 South Northamptonshire by-election =

UK Parliamentary by-election

The 1962 South Northamptonshire by-election was held in 1962 when the incumbent Conservative MP Reginald Manningham-Buller was elevated to the House of Lords. It was retained by the Conservative candidate, Albert Jones.

Buchan was serving in the Armed Forces, and stood to avail of the automatic military discharge for Parliamentary candidates publicised by Malcolm Thompson at the Middlesbrough West by-election the previous July.

South Northamptonshire by-election, 1962
Party	Candidate	Votes	%	±%
Conservative	Arthur Jones	14,921	41.15	−15.83
Labour	Ivor Wilde	14,004	38.62	−4.40
Liberal	N. Picarda	7,002	19.31	New
Independent	P. Buchan	332	0.9	New
Majority		917	2.53	−11.43
Turnout		36,259		
Conservative hold		Swing		
