= Arthur Jones (Conservative politician) =

British politician (1915–1991)

Arthur Jones M.P.

Albert Arthur Jones (23 October 1915 – 6 December 1991) was a British Conservative Party politician. He was twice Mayor of Bedford.

== Life ==
Bedford-born, Jones was educated at Bedford Modern School and became an estate agent, company director and farmer in north Bedfordshire. He became a councillor on Bedford Borough Council in 1949 and on Bedfordshire County Council in 1956, serving as Mayor of Bedford 1957–59. He was vice-president of the Association of Municipal Corporations and was chairman of the Conservative Party national advisory committee on local government.

Jones contested Wellingborough in 1955. He was Member of Parliament (MP) for Northamptonshire South from a 1962 by-election to 1974, and for Daventry from 1974 to 1979. His successor as MP for Daventry was Reg Prentice, previously MP for Newham North East who had defected from the Labour Party to the Conservatives two years earlier. He died in Bedford, aged 76.

Parliament of the United Kingdom
Preceded by Sir Reginald Manningham Buller	Member of Parliament for Northamptonshire South; 1962 – February 1974	Constituency abolished
New constituency	Member of Parliament for Daventry; February 1974 – 1979	Succeeded by Reg Prentice
