= John Luke Lowther =

British soldier

Colonel Sir John Luke Lowther KCVO CBE (17 November 1923 – 11 April 2011) was a British soldier and Northamptonshire gentleman.

== Family ==
Lowther was the son of Col. John George Lowther, who in turn was a younger brother of Sir Charles Lowther, 4th Baronet.

He married Jennifer Jane Bevan in 1952, by whom he had three children:

- Sarah Charlotte Margaret Lowther (b. 1954), married Henry Merton Henderson in 1977 and had issue
- Hugh William Lowther (b. 1956), married Hon. Amanda Vivian in 1985 and had issue
- Lavinia Mary "Lucy" Lowther (b. 1958), married Julian Edward Tomkins in 1983 and had issue

== Career ==
Lowther was commissioned a second lieutenant in the King's Royal Rifle Corps on 6 March 1943.

Lowther stood as Conservative candidate for Belper in the general elections of 1964 and 1966, but on both occasions was defeated by the incumbent MP, George Brown.

In 1971, Lowther was appointed High Sheriff of Northamptonshire. He received a deputy lieutenant's commission in 1977, and in 1984, he was appointed Lord Lieutenant of the county. While serving as Lord Lieutenant in 1986, he became Honorary Colonel of the Royal Anglian Regiment, Northampton Territorial Army battalion, an appointment he held until 1989, following which he received the honorary rank of colonel.

He was made a KCVO in the 1997 New Year Honours, and stepped down as Lord Lieutenant in 1998.

Honorary titles
Preceded by Sir Edward Ford	High Sheriff of Northamptonshire; 1971	Succeeded by James Macdonald-Buchanan
Preceded by John Walkelyne Chandos-Pole	Lord Lieutenant of Northamptonshire; 1984–1998	Succeeded by Lady Juliet Townsend
