= Samson Ricardo =

British politician

Samson Israel Ricardo

Member of Parliament for Windsor
- In office 1855–1857 Serving with Charles William Grenfell
- Preceded by: Lord Charles Wellesley
- Succeeded by: William Vansittart

Personal details
- Born: 19 November 1792 London, England
- Died: 14 November 1862 (aged 69) Grosvenor Place, London England
- Party: Whig
- Relations: David Ricardo (brother)
- Parent(s): Abraham Israel Ricardo; Abigail Delvalle
- Occupation: Businessman, politician

Samson Israel Ricardo (19 November 1792 – 14 November 1862) was a British politician who served as a Whig Member of Parliament (MP).

== Early life ==
Ricardo was born in London on 19 November 1792 into the wealthy family of Portuguese origin. He was a younger son of successful stockbroker Abraham Israel Ricardo and Abigail (née Delvalle) Ricardo, a daughter of Abraham Delvalle (also "del Valle"). Among his siblings were the political economist David Ricardo and financier Jacob Ricardo, who was the father of John Lewis Ricardo.

The Ricardo family were Sephardic Jews of Portuguese origin who had recently relocated from the Dutch Republic. His maternal aunt, Rebecca Delvalle, was wife of the engraver Wilson Lowry, mother of the engraver Joseph Wilson Lowry as well as the geologist, mineralogist, and author Delvalle Lowry.

== Career ==
He was also the business partner of his nephew John Lewis Ricardo, with whom he became an investor and director of the Electric Telegraph Company.

Ricardo was elected as MP for Windsor a by-election from 1855 to 1857. He had failed to win the seat in the 1852 general election and lost it in the 1857 general election.

== Personal life ==
Ricardo died at Grosvenor Place in London on 14 November 1862.

Parliament of the United Kingdom
Preceded by Lord Charles Wellesley	Member of Parliament for Windsor; 1855–1857; With: Charles William Grenfell	Succeeded by William Vansittart
