= Lady Juliet Townsend =

British writer

- Born: Lady Juliet Margaret Smith; 9 September 1941; Ascot, Berkshire
- Died: 29 November 2014 (aged 73)
- Spouse: John Townsend
- Children: 3
- Parent(s): Frederick Smith, 2nd Earl of Birkenhead; The Honourable Sheila Berry

Lady Juliet Margaret Townsend, DCVO (née Smith; 9 September 1941 – 29 November 2014) was a British writer who served as Lord Lieutenant of Northamptonshire from 1998 to 2014, the first woman to hold this position.

== Early life and family ==
Townsend was born Lady Juliet Smith in 1941 at Five Trees Cottage in Ascot, Berkshire, the only daughter of Frederick Smith, 2nd Earl of Birkenhead, a historian and biographer. Her mother was the Hon. Sheila Berry, daughter of William Berry, 1st Viscount Camrose. She grew up at The Cottage, Charlton, Northamptonshire, the home bought by her grandfather. She married John Townsend in 1970, and had three daughters. Beginning in 1977, the pair operated a bookstore.

== Career ==
She attended Somerville College, Oxford, graduating in 1960 with a degree in English. From 1965 to 2002, Townsend served as a lady-in-waiting to Princess Margaret, Countess of Snowdon. Margaret had requested that the appointed person be equipped to help supplement her perceived lack of a formal education.

Townsend wrote a book recording "every village, church, stately home and architectural curiosity" within Northamptonshire, publishing it in 1968. Her next literary project, a children's story set during the Indian Mutiny, was released in 1971. She regularly reviewed children's books for The Spectator, producing an annual guide on the year's best.

She held an almost forty-year membership in the Northamptonshire branch of the Campaign to Protect Rural England, and served as its president from 1988 to 1998. She left the position after her appointment as Lord Lieutenant of Northamptonshire, the first woman to hold this role. She retired in June 2014, citing mobility difficulties.

== Honours ==
- She was made a Member 4th Class of the Royal Victorian Order (MVO) in the 1981 Queen's Birthday Honours List.
- She was upgraded to Dame Commander of the Royal Victorian Order (DCVO) in the 2014 Queen's Birthday Honours List.

Honorary titles
Preceded by John Luke Lowther	Lord Lieutenant of Northamptonshire; 1998–2014	Succeeded by David Eric Laing
