= John Manningham-Buller, 2nd Viscount Dilhorne =

British peer and barrister (1932–2022)

The Right Honourable The Viscount Dilhorne

Member of the House of Lords
- Lord Temporal
- In office 7 September 1980 – 11 November 1999 as a hereditary peer
- Preceded by: The 1st Viscount Dilhorne
- Succeeded by: Seat abolished (Note: Pursuant to the House of Lords Act 1999.)

Personal details
- Born: John Mervyn Manningham-Buller; 28 February 1932
- Died: 25 June 2022 (aged 90)
- Party: Conservative

John Mervyn Manningham-Buller, 2nd Viscount Dilhorne (28 February 1932 – 25 June 2022), was a British peer and barrister.

== Background and education ==
Lord Dilhorne was the son of Reginald Manningham-Buller, 1st Viscount Dilhorne, and his wife, Lady Mary Lindsay, daughter of David Lindsay, 27th Earl of Crawford. His sister is Eliza Manningham-Buller, Baroness Manningham-Buller, the former head of MI5. He was educated at Eton and the Royal Military Academy, Sandhurst.

Dilhorne was 6 feet 9 inches (2.06 m) tall.

== Career ==
After service in the Coldstream Guards, Dilhorne was called to the bar from the Inner Temple in 1979. He was Managing Director of Stewart Smith (LP&M) Ltd from 1970 to 1974 and Chairman of the Value Added Tax Tribunal from 1988 to 1995, a member of Wiltshire County Council, 1967 to 1970, of the Joint Parliamentary Committee on Statutory Instruments, 1981 to 1988, of the JPC on Consolidation Bills, 1994–1999, and of the EC Select Committee (Law and Institutions), 1989–1992.

== Marriage and children ==
Lord Dilhorne married, firstly, Gillian Stockwell, on 8 October 1955, and they were divorced in 1973. They had three children:

- James Edward Manningham-Buller, 3rd Viscount Dilhorne (born 20 August 1956)
- Hon. Mervyn Reginald Manningham-Buller (born 11 July 1962)
- Hon. Mary Louise Manningham-Buller (born 8 March 1970)

Dilhorne married, secondly, Susannah Jane Eykyn, on 17 December 1981. She is a professor of clinical microbiology associated with St Thomas' Hospital.

The Dilhornes had homes in London and at Minterne Parva, near Cerne Abbas, Dorset.

Dilhorne died on 25 June 2022, at the age of 90, and was succeeded in the viscountcy by his elder son, James.

== Arms ==
Coat of arms of John Manningham-Buller, 2nd Viscount Dilhorne

Crest
1st a Saracen's head affrontée couped Proper 2nd out of a ducal coronet Gules a talbot's head Or collared Gules line terminating in a knot Sable.
Escutcheon
Quarterly 1st & 4th Sable on a cross Argent quarterly pierced of the field four eagles displayed of the first (Buller) 2nd & 3rd Sable a fess Ermine in chief three griffins' heads erased Or (Manningham).
Supporters
Dexter an eagle wings elevated and addorsed Ermine beaked and legged Or gorged with a ducal coronet Gules therefrom a line reflexed over the back and terminating in a knot Sable sinister a Pegasus Azure winged crined unguled and queued Argent both charged on the shoulder with a portcullis chained Gold.
Motto
Aquila Non Capit Muscas (The Eagle Does Not Catch Flies)

== Notes ==
Peerage of the United Kingdom
Preceded by Reginald Manningham-Buller	Viscount Dilhorne; 1980–2022; Member of the House of Lords (1980–1999)	Succeeded by James Manningham-Buller
Preceded by Reginald Manningham-Buller	Baron Dilhorne; 1980–2022	Succeeded by James Manningham-Buller
Baronetage of the United Kingdom
Preceded by Reginald Manningham-Buller	Baronet of Dilhorne; 1980–2022	Succeeded by James Manningham-Buller
