= Pickering Phipps (MP) =

British politician (1827–1890)

Pickering Phipps (14 March 1827 – 14 September 1890) was a British Member of Parliament who represented Northampton from 1874 to 1880 and South Northamptonshire from 1881 to 1885 for the Conservative Party.

== Early life and business career ==
Phipps was born in Northampton on 14 March 1827, the son of Edward Phipps and Elizabeth (née Outlaw). He was named for his grandfather, Pickering Phipps, a prominent Northampton brewer. His father died aged 25 when Pickering was an infant. He attended an elementary school in the town, then was indentured around 1841 to a draper, but later returned to work in the family brewery, where he inherited a large share on the death of his uncles. As well as the brewery, he was a director of the Northamptonshire Banking Company and its successor the Capital and Counties Bank.

He married Mary Ann Whitmy of Northampton in 1850.

== Political career and later life ==
Phipps served as a town councillor in Northampton from 1854, representing the South Ward, and was Mayor in 1860-61 and 1866–67. He stood down as a councillor in 1877 but returned in 1880.

Phipps was selected as the Conservative candidate for Northampton in the 1874 general election, and won the seat as part of a wider national swing towards the Conservatives under Disraeli - the seat had previously only returned Whigs, Radicals and Liberals since the 1830s. The Conservative victory was assisted by the presence of three Liberal candidates splitting the vote; the two Conservative candidates took 4865 votes against 5759 for the Liberals. At the election, the second seat was held by one of the two incumbent Liberals, Charles Gilpin, though following Gilpin's death later that year the second seat was also taken by a Conservative, Charles Merewether - again, with two Liberals splitting the vote.

However, at the 1880 general election both Phipps and Merewether were defeated by the Liberal candidates, Henry Labouchère and Charles Bradlaugh. Phipps returned to Parliament at a February 1881 by-election in South Northamptonshire, a solidly conservative seat, following the death of the incumbent Fairfax Cartwright; the last contested election in the seat had been in 1868, and Phipps was elected unopposed. At the 1885 general election the seat was split to form Mid Northamptonshire, which encompassed part of the county but was dominated by Northampton itself, with a more Liberal-leaning electorate. Phipps was opposed by the Hon. Charles Spencer, from a prominent local family, and defeated by a thousand votes.

Following the 1885 election he did not seek to return to Parliament, though he was suggested as a possible future candidate for South Northamptonshire; he had been in weak health since the late 1870s, aggravated by his attendance in the Commons and the 1885 election campaign. In 1888, after the formation of the Northampton County Council, he was elected to represent Wootton.

Phipps built Collingtree Grange in 1875, which was since demolished, though the entrance lodges and gateway on the A45 road still survive. St Matthew's Church, Northampton was financed by his son, also Pickering Phipps, and constructed as his memorial.

Parliament of the United Kingdom
Preceded by Anthony Henley	Member of Parliament for Northampton; 1874 –1880	Succeeded by Charles Bradlaugh; Henry Labouchère
Preceded by Fairfax Cartwright (British politician)	Member of Parliament for South Northamptonshire; 1881 –1885	Succeeded by Sir Rainald Knightley
