= David Guthrie (British politician) =

English politician (1861–1918)

Member of Parliament for South Northamptonshire
- In office 4 July 1892 – 13 July 1895
- Preceded by: Rainald Knightley
- Succeeded by: Edward Douglas-Pennant

Personal details
- Born: 1861
- Died: 12 January 1918 (aged 56–57)
- Party: Liberal

David Charles Guthrie (1861 – 12 January 1918) was a British Liberal Party politician who served as Member of Parliament for South Northamptonshire in the 25th Parliament between 1892 and 1895.

Guthrie was first elected at the 1892 general election.

Parliament of the United Kingdom
| Preceded by Rainald Knightley | Member of Parliament for South Northamptonshire; 1892–1895 | Succeeded by Edward Douglas-Pennant |
