= South Northamptonshire (constituency) =

UK Parliament constituency (since 2010)

Coordinates: 52.10°N 1.05°W

- County constituency for the House of Commons
- Interactive map of boundaries since 2024
- Location within the East Midlands
- County: Northamptonshire
- Electorate: 76,555 (March 2020)
- Major settlements: Brackley, King's Sutton, Towcester

Current constituency
- Created: 2010
- Member of Parliament: Sarah Bool (Conservative)
- Seats: One
- Created from: Daventry

1950–1974
- Seats: One
- Created from: Daventry and Kettering
- Replaced by: Daventry

1832–1918
- Seats: 1832–1885: Two; 1885–1918: One
- Created from: Northamptonshire
- Replaced by: Daventry

South Northamptonshire is a constituency (Note: A county constituency (for the purposes of election expenses and type of returning officer)) represented in the House of Commons of the UK Parliament since 2024 by Sarah Bool of the Conservative Party. As with all constituencies, the constituency elects one Member of Parliament (MP) by the first past the post system of election at least every five years.

The seat was first formed in 1832 and, until the current version was formed in 2010, it was interchangeable with the constituency of Daventry.

== Constituency profile ==
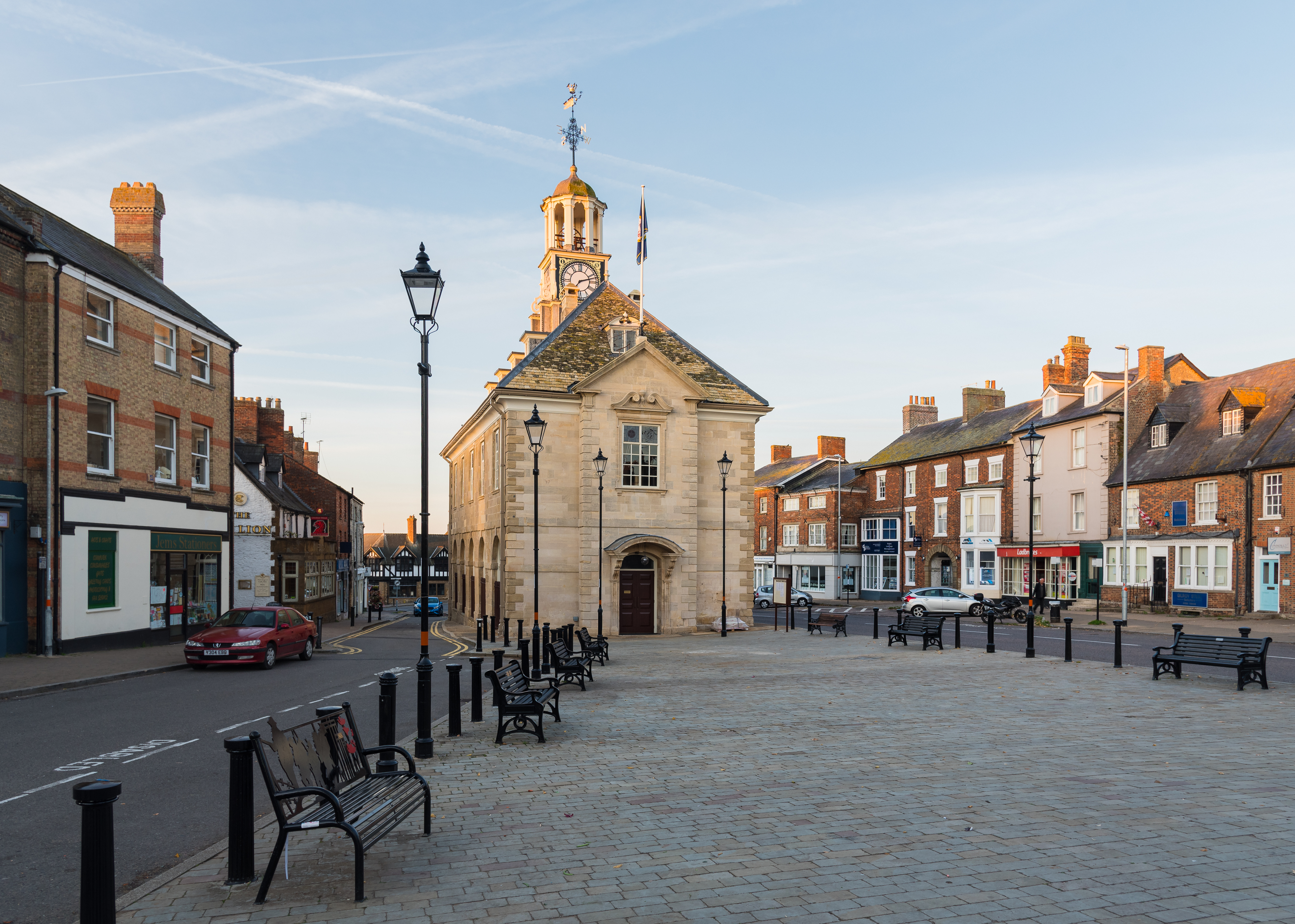
Market Place, Brackley

South Northamptonshire is a constituency in Northamptonshire in the East Midlands of England. Its largest town is Brackley, which has a population of around 17,000. Other settlements include the town of Towcester and the villages of Middleton Cheney, Silverstone, Deanshanger, Roade, Bugbrooke and Wollaston.

This constituency covers a large, rural area to the south of Northampton with many small villages. Brackley and Towcester are historic market towns; Brackley was traditionally a centre for rural trade, especially in wool and lace, whilst Towcester was an important stopping point on Watling Street and was originally a Roman garrison town called Lactodurum. South Northamptonshire has a significant motorsport industry; The Mercedes and Aston Martin Formula One teams are based here and Silverstone Circuit is partially located within its boundaries. This constituency is affluent, especially in Brackley and Towcester which have very low levels of deprivation. House prices here are generally higher than the UK average and considerably higher than the rest of the East Midlands.

South Northamptonshire has a low proportion of young adults and an above-average population of retirees. Residents have high levels of income and homeownership and the child poverty rate is less than half the overall UK figure. They have average levels of education and a high proportion work in the technology, arts and construction sectors. The percentage of residents claiming unemployment benefits is half the UK-wide rate. White people made up 95% of the population at the 2021 census.

At the local council level, most of the constituency is represented by Conservatives with some Reform UK councillors also elected. An estimated 55% of voters in South Northamptonshire supported leaving the European Union in the 2016 referendum, marginally higher than the UK-wide rate of 52%.

== History ==
The constituency was first created in 1832 as the Southern Division of Northamptonshire under the Great Reform Act when the Parliamentary County of Northampton was split into the Northern and Southern Divisions. It elected two Members of Parliament (MPs) by the bloc vote system of election. Under the Redistribution of Seats Act 1885, Northamptonshire was reorganised into four divisions (Eastern, Mid, Northern and Southern) each electing one MP by the first past the post system.

The seat was abolished under the Representation of the People Act 1918, forming the bulk of the new constituency of Daventry. Under the Representation of the People Act 1948, which came into effect for the 1950 general election, the seat was recreated (formally known as South Northants), replacing Daventry. This was reversed once again from the February 1974 election.

Finally, the current version of the seat was created for the 2010 election under the fifth periodic review of Westminster constituencies, taking approximately half the Daventry seat and parts of Northampton South. This time, however, Daventry was retained with revised boundaries, as the parliamentary representation in Northamptonshire was increased by one seat following substantial population growth.

Prominent members

Three names feature prominently among the area's Commons members, the 3rd and 5th Earl Spencer (during their tenures as MP having a courtesy title only, Viscount Althorp – Althorp is a major country house in the seat, well known as the childhood home of Diana, Princess of Wales); Edward Fitzroy (son of Lord Southampton), Speaker of the House of Commons from 1928 until his death in 1943; and lastly, Reginald Manningham-Buller, 1st Viscount Dilhorne who on accomplishment of a peerage sat for the final two years of his life as the historic equivalent of the President of the Supreme Court of the United Kingdom with additional functions, the Lord Chancellor.

In the 19th century history of the seat the Cartwright family (with three members) lived in the stately home Aynhoe Park near Banbury.

== Boundaries ==
=== Historic ===
1832–1885: The Hundreds of Kings Sutton, Chipping Warden, Greens Norton, Cleley, Towcester, Fawsley, Wymersley, Spelhoe, Nobottle Grove, and Guilsborough.

1885–1918: The Sessional Divisions of Brackley and Towcester, and part of the Sessional Division of Daventry. (The part of the Sessional Division of Daventry included in South Northamptonshire excluded the parishes of Ashby St. Ledgers, Barby, Claycoton Crick, Elkington, Kilsby, Lilboume, Long Buckley, Stanford, Watford, West Haddon, Winwick, and Yelvertoft, which were assigned to Mid Northamptonshire).

1950–1974: The Boroughs of Daventry and Brackley, and the Rural Districts of Brackley, Daventry, Northampton, and Towcester.

2010–2021: The District of South Northamptonshire wards of Astwell, Blakesley, Blisworth, Brackley East, Brackley South, Brackley West, Chase, Cogenhoe, Collingtree, Cosgrove, Courteenhall, Deanshanger, Grafton, Kings Sutton, Kingthorn, Little Brook, Middleton Cheney, Salcey, Silverstone, Steane, Tove, Towcester Brook, Towcester Mill, Wardoun, Washington, Whittlewood, and Yardley, and the Borough of Northampton wards of East Hunsbury, Nene Valley, and West Hunsbury.

2021–2024: With effect from 1 April 2021, the Borough of Northampton and the District of South Northamptonshire were abolished and absorbed into the new unitary authority of West Northamptonshire. From that date, the constituency comprised the District of West Northamptonshire wards of Brackley, Bugbrooke (part), Deanshanger, Duston West and St. Crispin (part), East Hunsbury and Shelfleys, Hackleton and Grange Park, Middleton Cheney, Nene Valley, Silverstone, Sixfields (part), and Towcester and Roade.

=== Current ===
Further to the 2023 review of Westminster constituencies, which came into effect for the 2024 general election, the composition of the constituency was defined as follows (as they existed on 1 April 2021):

- The District of North Northamptonshire ward of Irchester (part)
- The District of West Northamptonshire wards of Brackley; Bugbrooke; Deanshanger; Hackleton and Grange Park; Middleton Cheney; Silverstone (most); Towcester and Roade.

The parts in the former Borough of Northampton were transferred to Northampton South. The constituency gained the part of the Irchester ward from Wellingborough and the remainder of the Bugbrooke ward from Daventry. A small part of Silverstone ward was transferred to Daventry.

Further to local government boundary reviews which came into effect in May 2025, the constituency now comprises the following:

- The District of North Northamptonshire ward of Irchester (part)
- The District of West Northamptonshire wards of: Brackley; Campion (most); Cogenhoe and The Houghtons (most); Deanshanger and Paulerspury; Hackleton and Roade; Middleton Cheney; Nene Valley (part); Rural South Northamptonshire (most); Towcester.

Present bordering constituencies

The constituency is bordered by Daventry and Northampton South to the north, Wellingborough and Rushden to the north east, Milton Keynes North to the south east, Buckingham and Bletchley to the south, Bicester and Woodstock to the south west, and Banbury to the west.

== Members of Parliament ==
=== MPs 1832–1885 ===
Northamptonshire prior to 1832

Election	First member	First party	Second member	Second party
1832	Viscount Althorp	Whig	William Ralph Cartwright	Tory
1834	Viscount Althorp	Whig	William Ralph Cartwright	Conservative
1835	Sir Charles Knightley, Bt	Conservative	William Ralph Cartwright	Conservative
1846 by-election	Sir Charles Knightley, Bt	Conservative	Cpt. Richard Howard-Vyse (Note: Later a member for Windsor: 4 November 1863 – 11 July 1865)	Conservative
1852	Rainald Knightley	Conservative	Cpt. Richard Howard-Vyse	Conservative
1857	Rainald Knightley	Conservative	Viscount Althorp	Whig
1858 by-election	Rainald Knightley	Conservative	Col. Henry Cartwright	Conservative
1868	Rainald Knightley	Conservative	Fairfax Cartwright	Conservative
1881 by-election	Rainald Knightley	Conservative	Pickering Phipps	Conservative
1885	Redistribution of Seats Act: reduced to one member			

=== MPs 1885–1918 ===
Year	Member	Party
1885	Sir Rainald Knightley	Conservative
1892	David Guthrie (Note: This source)	Liberal
1895	Hon. Edward Douglas-Pennant	Conservative
1900	Hon. Edward FitzRoy	Conservative
1906	Archibald Grove	Liberal
1910	Hon. Edward FitzRoy	Conservative
1917	Hon. Edward FitzRoy	National Party
1918	Hon. Edward FitzRoy	Unionist
1918	Constituency abolished, but revived in 1950	

=== MPs 1950–1974 ===
Daventry and Kettering prior to 1950

Election	Member	Party	Notes
1950	Reginald Manningham-Buller	Conservative	Resigned 1962 on being raised to the peerage
1962 by-election	Arthur Jones	Conservative	
February 1974	Constituency abolished, but revived in 2010		

=== MPs since 2010 ===
Daventry prior to 2010

Election	Member	Party
2010	Andrea Leadsom	Conservative
2024	Sarah Bool	Conservative

== Elections ==
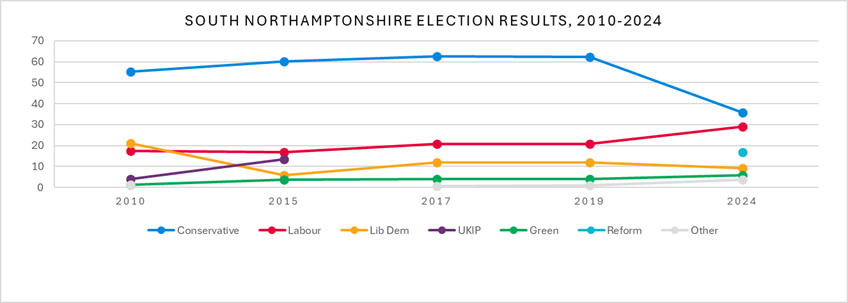
South Northamptonshire election results 2010–2024

=== Elections in the 2020s ===
General election 2024: South Northamptonshire
Party	Candidate	Votes	%	±%
Conservative	Sarah Bool	19,191	35.7	−27.5
Labour	Rufia Ashraf	15,504	28.9	+8.1
Reform	Paul Hogan	8,962	16.7	New
Liberal Democrats	Stewart Tolley	4,989	9.3	−1.8
Green	Emmie Williamson	3,040	5.7	+1.9
Independent	Ian McCord	1,556	2.9	New
Workers Party	Mick Stott	246	0.5	New
Independent	Stuart Robert	209	0.4	New
Majority		3,687	6.8	−35.6
Turnout		53,697	68.6	−4.3
Registered electors		78,233		
Conservative hold		Swing	−17.8	

=== Elections in the 2010s ===
General election 2019: South Northamptonshire
Party	Candidate	Votes	%	±%
Conservative	Andrea Leadsom	41,755	62.4	−0.1
Labour	Gen Kitchen	13,994	20.9	−6.4
Liberal Democrats	Chris Lofts	7,891	11.8	+6.2
Green	Denise Donaldson	2,634	3.9	+1.8
Independent	Josh Phillips	463	0.7	+0.2
Independent	Stuart McCutcheon	171	0.3	New
Majority		27,761	41.5	+6.3
Turnout		66,908	73.7	−2.2
Conservative hold		Swing	+3.15	

General election 2017: South Northamptonshire
Party	Candidate	Votes	%	±%
Conservative	Andrea Leadsom	40,599	62.5	+2.4
Labour	Sophie Johnson	17,759	27.3	+10.6
Liberal Democrats	Chris Lofts	3,623	5.6	−0.3
UKIP	Nigel Wickens	1,363	2.1	−11.4
Green	Denise Donaldson	1,357	2.1	−1.6
Independent	Josh Philips	297	0.5	New
Majority		22,840	35.2	−8.2
Turnout		64,998	75.9	+4.8
Conservative hold		Swing	−4.15	

General election 2015: South Northamptonshire
Party	Candidate	Votes	%	±%
Conservative	Andrea Leadsom	36,607	60.1	+4.9
Labour	Lucy Mills	10,191	16.7	−0.6
UKIP	Roger Clark	8,204	13.5	+9.5
Liberal Democrats	Tom Snowdon	3,613	5.9	−15.1
Green	Damon Boughen	2,247	3.7	+2.6
Majority		26,416	43.4	+9.2
Turnout		60,862	71.1	−1.9
Conservative hold		Swing	+2.75	

General election 2010: South Northamptonshire
Party	Candidate	Votes	%	±%
Conservative	Andrea Leadsom	33,081	55.2	+3.7
Liberal Democrats	Scott Collins	12,603	21.0	+3.9
Labour	Matthew May	10,380	17.3	−11.4
UKIP	Barry Mahoney	2,406	4.0	+1.4
English Democrat	Tony Tappy	735	1.2	New
Green	Marcus Rock	685	1.1	New
Majority		20,478	34.2	
Turnout		59,890	73.0	
Conservative hold		Swing	+3.8	

=== Elections in the 1970s ===
General election 1970: South Northamptonshire
Party	Candidate	Votes	%	±%
Conservative	Arthur Jones	29,070	51.16	
Labour	Gordon Roberts	21,131	37.18	
Liberal	Peter Smout	6,626	11.66	New
Majority		7,939	13.98	
Turnout		56,827	77.87	
Conservative hold		Swing		

=== Elections in the 1960s ===
General election 1966: South Northamptonshire
Party	Candidate	Votes	%	±%
Conservative	Arthur Jones	25,023	52.84	
Labour	Graham Ridge	22,332	47.16	
Majority		2,691	5.68	
Turnout		47,355	82.18	
Conservative hold		Swing		

General election 1964: South Northamptonshire
Party	Candidate	Votes	%	±%
Conservative	Arthur Jones	24,823	54.27	
Labour	Ivor Wilde	20,916	45.73	
Majority		3,907	8.54	
Turnout		45,739	83.04	
Conservative hold		Swing		

1962 South Northamptonshire by-election
Party	Candidate	Votes	%	±%
Conservative	Arthur Jones	14,921	41.15	−15.83
Labour	Ivor Wilde	14,004	38.62	−4.40
Liberal	N. Picarda	7,002	19.31	New
Independent	P. Buchan	332	0.9	New
Majority		917	2.53	−11.43
Turnout		36,259		
Conservative hold		Swing		

=== Elections in the 1950s ===
General election 1959: South Northamptonshire
Party	Candidate	Votes	%	±%
Conservative	Reginald Manningham-Buller	24,226	56.98	
Labour	Arthur Richardson	18,292	43.02	
Majority		5,934	13.96	
Turnout		42,518	82.72	
Conservative hold		Swing		

General election 1955: South Northamptonshire
Party	Candidate	Votes	%	±%
Conservative	Reginald Manningham-Buller	21,497	55.35	
Labour	Ronald Lewis	17,339	44.65	
Majority		4,158	10.70	
Turnout		38,836	81.56	
Conservative hold		Swing		

General election 1951: South Northamptonshire
Party	Candidate	Votes	%	±%
Conservative	Reginald Manningham-Buller	21,282	53.59	
Labour	Dennis Webb	18,434	46.41	
Majority		2,848	7.18	
Turnout		39,716	85.90	
Conservative hold		Swing		

General election 1950: South Northamptonshire
Party	Candidate	Votes	%	±%
Conservative	Reginald Manningham-Buller	18,612	47.62	
Labour	Dennis Webb	16,852	43.12	
Liberal	Llewellyn Evans	3,620	9.26	
Majority		1,760	4.50	
Turnout		39,084	87.10	
Conservative win (new seat)				

== Election results 1868–1918 ==
=== Elections in the 1860s ===
General election 1868: Northamptonshire South (2 seats)
Party	Candidate	Votes	%	±%
Conservative	Rainald Knightley	2,522	34.4	−0.3
Conservative	Fairfax Cartwright	2,505	34.2	+1.3
Liberal	Frederick John FitzRoy	2,305	31.4	−0.9
Majority		200	2.8	+2.2
Turnout		4,819 (est)	76.0 (est)	−3.4
Registered electors		6,338		
Conservative hold		Swing	+0.1	
Conservative hold		Swing	+0.9	

=== Elections in the 1870s ===
General election 1874: Northamptonshire South (2 seats)
Party	Candidate	Votes	%	±%
Conservative	Fairfax Cartwright	Unopposed		
Conservative	Rainald Knightley	Unopposed		
Registered electors		6,029		
Conservative hold				
Conservative hold				

=== Elections in the 1880s ===
General election 1880: Northamptonshire South (2 seats)
Party	Candidate	Votes	%	±%
Conservative	Fairfax Cartwright	Unopposed		
Conservative	Rainald Knightley	Unopposed		
Registered electors		6,093		
Conservative hold				
Conservative hold				

Cartwright's death caused a by-election.

By-election, 15 Feb 1881: Northamptonshire South (1 seat)
Party	Candidate	Votes	%	±%
Conservative	Pickering Phipps	Unopposed		
Registered electors		6,093		
Conservative hold				

General election 1885: Northamptonshire South
Party	Candidate	Votes	%	±%
Conservative	Rainald Knightley	4,074	50.4	N/A
Liberal	Maurice Fitzgerald	4,012	49.6	New
Majority		62	0.8	N/A
Turnout		8,086	83.9	N/A
Registered electors		9,636		
Conservative hold		Swing	N/A	

General election 1886: Northamptonshire South
Party	Candidate	Votes	%	±%
Conservative	Rainald Knightley	4,003	52.1	+1.7
Liberal	James Carmichael	3,687	47.9	−1.7
Majority		316	4.2	+3.4
Turnout		7,690	79.8	−4.1
Registered electors		9,636		
Conservative hold		Swing	+1.7	

=== Elections in the 1890s ===
General election 1892: Northamptonshire South
Party	Candidate	Votes	%	±%
Liberal	David Guthrie	3,930	50.3	+2.4
Conservative	Thomas Leslie-Melville-Cartwright	3,882	49.7	−2.4
Majority		48	0.6	N/A
Turnout		7,812	84.4	+4.6
Registered electors		9,251		
Liberal gain from Conservative		Swing	+2.4	

Douglas-Pennant

General election 1895: Northamptonshire South
Party	Candidate	Votes	%	±%
Conservative	Edward Douglas-Pennant	4,553	57.8	+8.1
Liberal	David Guthrie	3,324	42.2	−8.1
Majority		1,229	15.6	N/A
Turnout		7,877	86.2	+1.8
Registered electors		9,134		
Conservative gain from Liberal		Swing	+8.1	

=== Elections in the 1900s ===
General election 1900: Northamptonshire South
Party	Candidate	Votes	%	±%
Conservative	Edward FitzRoy	4,174	56.9	−0.9
Liberal	Archibald Grove	3,166	43.1	+0.9
Majority		1,008	13.8	−1.8
Turnout		7,340	81.8	−4.4
Registered electors		8,976		
Conservative hold		Swing	−0.9	

Grove

General election 1906: Northamptonshire South
Party	Candidate	Votes	%	±%
Liberal	Archibald Grove	4,136	52.0	+8.9
Conservative	Charles Douglas-Pennant	3,814	48.0	−8.9
Majority		322	4.0	N/A
Turnout		7,950	88.1	+6.3
Registered electors		9,023		
Liberal gain from Conservative		Swing	+8.9	

=== Elections in the 1910s ===
Kellaway

General election January 1910: Northamptonshire South
Party	Candidate	Votes	%	±%
Conservative	Edward FitzRoy	4,565	53.6	+5.6
Liberal	Frederick Kellaway	3,955	46.4	−5.6
Majority		610	7.2	N/A
Turnout		8,520	91.7	+3.6
Registered electors		9,290		
Conservative gain from Liberal		Swing	+5.6	

General election December 1910: Northamptonshire South
Party	Candidate	Votes	%	±%
Conservative	Edward FitzRoy	4,340	53.1	−0.5
Liberal	Arthur Augustus Thomas	3,827	46.9	+0.5
Majority		513	6.2	−1.0
Turnout		8,167	87.9	−3.8
Registered electors		9,290		
Conservative hold		Swing	−0.5	

General Election 1914–15:

Another General Election was required to take place before the end of 1915. The political parties had been making preparations for an election to take place and by July 1914, the following candidates had been selected;

- Unionist: Edward FitzRoy
- Liberal: Arthur Augustus Thomas

== Election results 1832–1868 ==
=== Elections in the 1830s ===
General election 1832: Northamptonshire South (2 seats)
Party	Candidate	Votes	%
Tory	William Ralph Cartwright	Unopposed	
Whig	John Spencer	Unopposed	
Registered electors		4,425	
Tory win (new seat)			
Whig win (new seat)			

General election 1835: Northamptonshire South (2 seats)
Party	Candidate	Votes	%
Conservative	William Ralph Cartwright	Unopposed	
Conservative	Charles Knightley	Unopposed	
Registered electors		4,463	
Conservative hold			
Conservative gain from Whig			

General election 1837: Northamptonshire South (2 seats)
Party	Candidate	Votes	%
Conservative	William Ralph Cartwright	Unopposed	
Conservative	Charles Knightley	Unopposed	
Registered electors		4,626	
Conservative hold			
Conservative hold			

=== Elections in the 1840s ===
General election 1841: Northamptonshire South (2 seats)
Party	Candidate	Votes	%	±%
Conservative	William Ralph Cartwright	2,436	42.8	N/A
Conservative	Charles Knightley	2,324	40.9	N/A
Whig	Henry FitzRoy	925	16.3	New
Majority		1,399	24.6	N/A
Turnout		3,305 (est)	72.0 (est)	N/A
Registered electors		4,589		
Conservative hold		Swing	N/A	
Conservative hold		Swing	N/A	

Cartwright resigned by accepting the office of Steward of the Chiltern Hundreds, causing a by-election.

By-election, 24 February 1846: Northamptonshire South
Party	Candidate	Votes	%	±%
Conservative	Richard Howard-Vyse	Unopposed		
Conservative hold				

General election 1847: Northamptonshire South (2 seats)
Party	Candidate	Votes	%	±%
Conservative	Charles Knightley	2,272	39.2	−1.7
Conservative	Richard Howard-Vyse	2,064	35.6	−7.2
Whig	Anthony Henley	1,460	25.2	+8.9
Majority		604	10.4	−14.2
Turnout		3,628 (est)	76.7 (est)	+4.7
Registered electors		4,729		
Conservative hold		Swing	−3.1	
Conservative hold		Swing	−5.8	

=== Elections in the 1850s ===
General election 1852: Northamptonshire South (2 seats)
Party	Candidate	Votes	%	±%
Conservative	Richard Howard-Vyse	1,833	47.9	+12.3
Conservative	Rainald Knightley	1,833	47.9	+8.7
Whig	John Houghton	164	4.3	−20.9
Majority		1,669	43.6	+33.2
Turnout		1,997 (est)	43.7 (est)	−33.0
Registered electors		4,568		
Conservative hold		Swing	+11.4	
Conservative hold		Swing	+9.6	

General election 1857: Northamptonshire South (2 seats)
Party	Candidate	Votes	%	±%
Whig	John Spencer	2,107	37.4	+33.1
Conservative	Rainald Knightley	1,932	34.3	−13.6
Conservative	Richard Howard-Vyse	1,593	28.3	−19.6
Majority		514	9.1	N/A
Turnout		3,870 (est)	82.8 (est)	+39.1
Registered electors		4,675		
Whig gain from Conservative		Swing	+33.1	
Conservative hold		Swing	−15.1	

Spencer succeeded to the peerage, becoming 5th Earl Spencer and causing a by-election.

By-election, 20 February 1858: Northamptonshire South
Party	Candidate	Votes	%	±%
Conservative	Henry Cartwright	1,983	51.1	−11.5
Whig	Anthony Henley	1,899	48.9	+11.5
Majority		84	2.2	N/A
Turnout		3,882	83.0	+0.2
Registered electors		4,675		
Conservative gain from Whig		Swing	−11.5	

General election 1859: Northamptonshire South (2 seats)
Party	Candidate	Votes	%	±%
Conservative	Rainald Knightley	Unopposed		
Conservative	Henry Cartwright	Unopposed		
Registered electors		4,955		
Conservative hold				
Conservative gain from Liberal				

=== Elections in the 1860s ===
General election 1865: Northamptonshire South (2 seats)
Party	Candidate	Votes	%	±%
Conservative	Rainald Knightley	2,206	34.7	N/A
Conservative	Henry Cartwright	2,092	32.9	N/A
Liberal	Frederick FitzRoy	2,054	32.3	New
Majority		38	0.6	N/A
Turnout		4,203 (est)	79.4 (est)	N/A
Registered electors		5,293		
Conservative hold		Swing	N/A	
Conservative hold		Swing	N/A	

== See also ==
- parliamentary constituencies in Northamptonshire
