= Sir Charles Knightley, 2nd Baronet =

British politician (1781–1864)

Sir Charles Knightley Bt
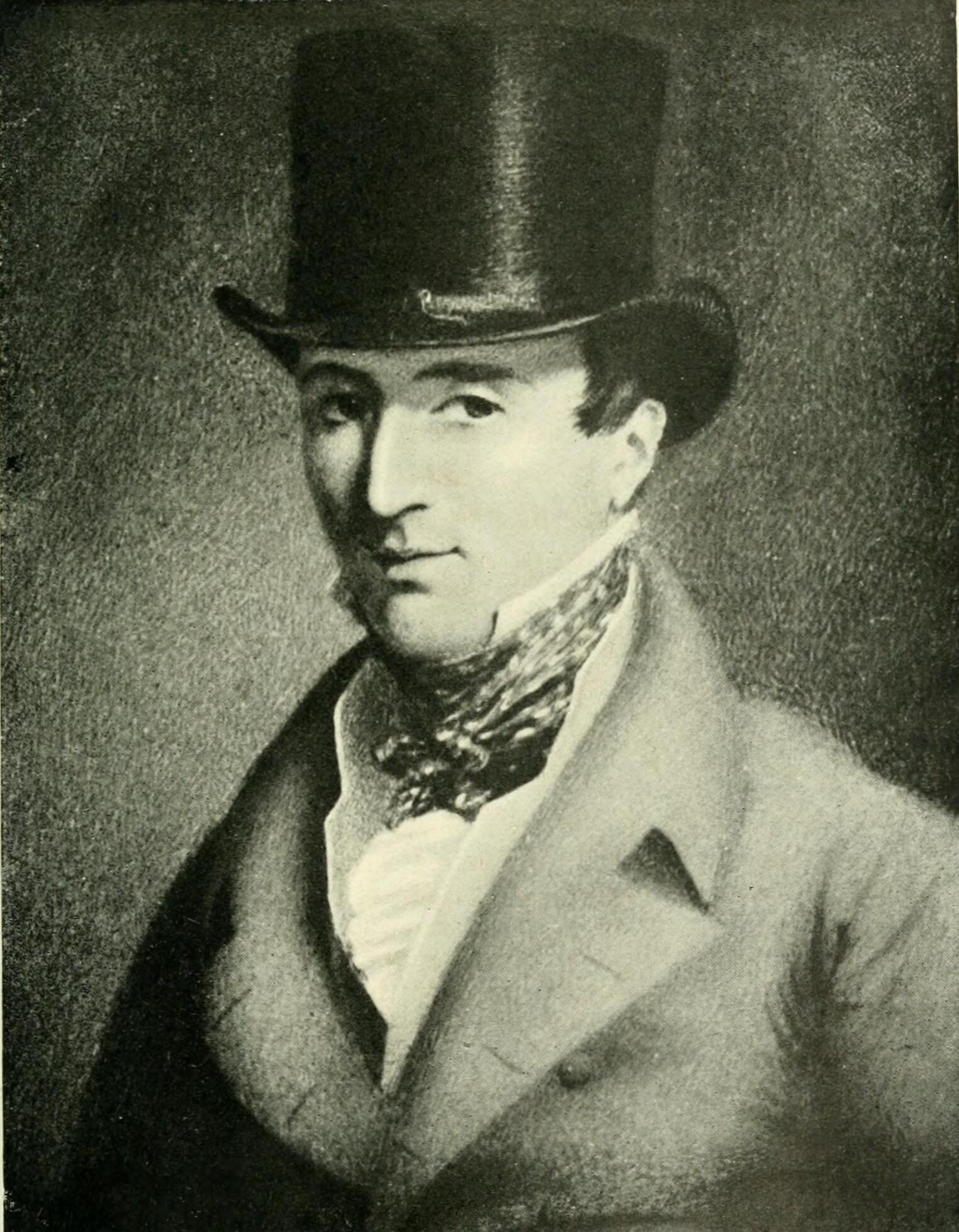
- Drawing of Knightley, 1813

Member of Parliament for South Northamptonshire
- In office 10 January 1835 – 19 July 1852 Serving with Richard Howard-Vyse (1846–1852); William Ralph Cartwright (1835–1846)
- Preceded by: John Spencer; William Ralph Cartwright
- Succeeded by: Richard Howard-Vyse; Rainald Knightley

Personal details
- Born: 30 January 1781
- Died: 30 August 1864 (aged 83) Northamptonshire, England
- Party: Conservative
- Spouse: Selina Mary Hervey (m. 1813)
- Relations: Sir John Knightley, 1st Baronet (uncle)
- Children: 2, including Rainald

Sir Charles Knightley, 2nd Baronet Bt (30 January 1781 – 30 August 1864) was a British Conservative politician.

== Early life ==
Knightley was the son of Reverend Charles Knightley and Elizabeth (née Boulton).

He succeeded to the Baronetcy of Fawsley in 1812 upon the death of his uncle, Sir John Knightley, 1st Baronet.

== Career ==
Knightley was first elected Conservative MP for South Northamptonshire at the 1835 general election and held the seat until 1852, when he did not seek re-election.

He was reportedly a skilled horseman and consummate trainer, using the Pytchley Hunt for jumping practice.

== Personal life and death ==
On 24 August 1813, he married Selina Mary Hervey; they had at least two children, including Rainald Knightley, 1st Baron Knightley.

Upon his death on 30 August 1864 in Northamptonshire, the title was inherited by his son, Rainald.

Parliament of the United Kingdom
Preceded by John Spencer; William Ralph Cartwright	Member of Parliament for South Northamptonshire; 1835–1852; With: Richard Howard-Vyse (1846–1852); William Ralph Cartwright (1835–1846)	Succeeded by Richard Howard-Vyse; Rainald Knightley
Baronetage of the United Kingdom
Preceded by John Knightley	Baronet (of Fawsley); 1812 – 1864	Succeeded by Rainald Knightley
