= John Spencer, 5th Earl Spencer =

British politician

The Right Honourable The Earl Spencer KG KP PC
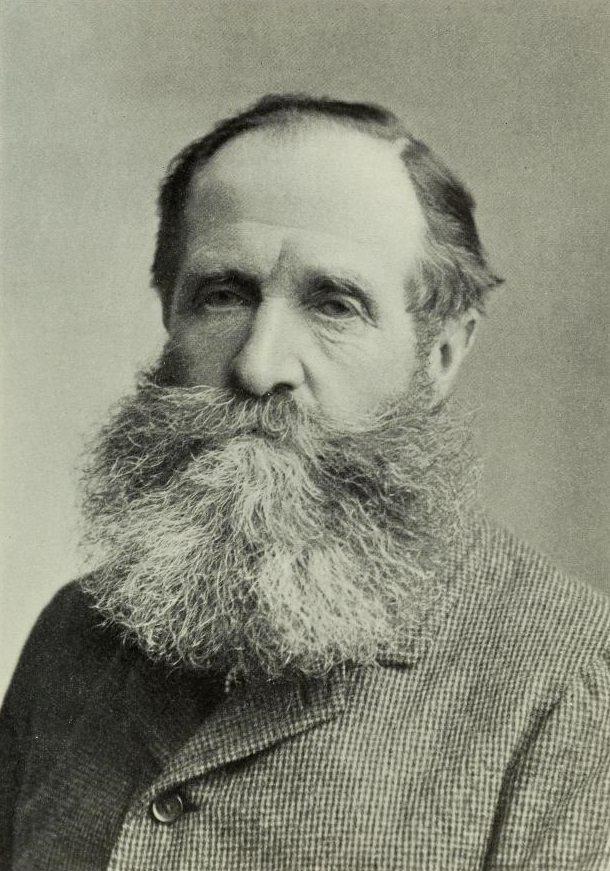
- The Earl Spencer, c. 1890s

Lord President of the Council
- In office 28 April 1880 – 19 March 1883
- Monarch: Victoria
- Prime Minister: William Ewart Gladstone
- Preceded by: The Duke of Richmond
- Succeeded by: The Lord Carlingford
- In office 6 February – 3 August 1886
- Monarch: Victoria
- Prime Minister: William Ewart Gladstone
- Preceded by: The Viscount Cranbrook
- Succeeded by: The Viscount Cranbrook

Lord Lieutenant of Ireland
- In office 18 December 1868 – 17 February 1874
- Monarch: Victoria
- Prime Minister: William Ewart Gladstone
- Preceded by: The Duke of Abercorn
- Succeeded by: The Duke of Abercorn
- In office 4 May 1882 – 9 June 1885
- Monarch: Victoria
- Prime Minister: William Ewart Gladstone
- Preceded by: The Earl Cowper
- Succeeded by: The Earl of Carnarvon

Member of the House of Lords
- Lord Temporal
- In office 27 December 1857 – 13 August 1910
- Preceded by: The 4th Earl Spencer
- Succeeded by: The 6th Earl Spencer

Personal details
- Born: John Poyntz Spencer; 27 October 1835 Spencer House, London
- Died: 13 August 1910 (aged 74) Althorp, Northamptonshire
- Party: Liberal
- Spouse: Charlotte Seymour (m. 1858; died 1903)
- Parents: Frederick Spencer, 4th Earl Spencer; Georgiana Poyntz
- Education: Trinity College, Cambridge

John Poyntz Spencer, 5th Earl Spencer (27 October 1835 – 13 August 1910), known as Viscount Althorp from 1845 to 1857 (and also known as the "Red Earl" because of his distinctive long red beard), was a British Liberal Party politician under, and close friend of, prime minister William Ewart Gladstone. He was twice Lord Lieutenant of Ireland.

== Background and education ==
Spencer was the son of Frederick Spencer, 4th Earl Spencer, by his first wife Georgiana, daughter of William Poyntz. The prominent Whig politician John Spencer, 3rd Earl Spencer, was his uncle and Charles Spencer, 6th Earl Spencer, his half-brother. He was educated at Harrow and Trinity College, Cambridge, from which he graduated in 1857.

== Political career, 1857–1885 ==
Almost immediately after leaving Cambridge Spencer was elected to parliament for South Northamptonshire as a Liberal, before departing for a tour of North America. He returned in December 1857, and within a few days his father died, leaving him as the new Earl Spencer. He was sworn of the Privy Council in 1859 and made a Knight of the Garter in 1864. Spencer split from other whiggish aristocratic Liberals in 1866 on the issue of Russell's reform bill, which he supported, and his loyalty was rewarded by his appointment as Lord Lieutenant of Ireland when Gladstone returned to power in 1868. Ireland came to be a major preoccupation of the remainder of Spencer's long political career. In this first tenure as Lord Lieutenant, he had to deal with implementation of the disestablishment of the Church of Ireland in 1869 and of the Landlord and Tenant (Ireland) Act 1870, both of which measures he strongly supported. Spencer, in fact, went further than most of his ministerial colleagues, including Gladstone himself, in arguing for the setting up of government tribunals to enforce fair rents on Irish landlords (a reform which would eventually be introduced by the Land Law (Ireland) Act 1881).

Spencer, along with the successive Chief Secretaries for Ireland, Chichester Fortescue and Spencer's own cousin, Lord Hartington, supported coercive legislation to deal with the increase in agrarian crime, but at the same time supported a policy of releasing Fenian prisoners when possible. Spencer also had to deal during his tenure with Gladstone's Irish Universities Bill. In spite of Spencer's efforts to secure the support of the Catholic hierarchy for the bill, they opposed it, and it went down to defeat in the commons in March 1873. The government lingered on for a further year, until the election defeat of February 1874, when Spencer found himself out of office. When Gladstone returned to power for his second government in 1880, Spencer joined the Cabinet as Lord President of the Council, having responsibility for education policy, and was partially responsible for several major educational reforms of the period. The increasingly tense situation in Ireland, however, commanded an increasing portion of Spencer's time. In May 1882, Gladstone's decision to release the Irish Nationalist leader Charles Stewart Parnell from prison led to the resignation of the hardline Chief Secretary for Ireland, W. E. Forster. As a result, Spencer, while retaining his seat in the cabinet and position as Lord President, was again appointed Lord Lieutenant to take charge of the government's Irish policy.

=== Ireland ===
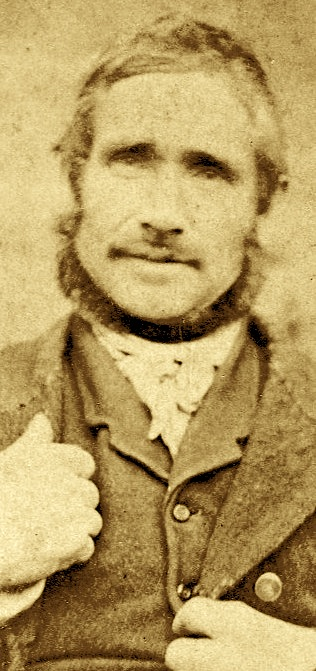
Myles Joyce

Spencer and his new chief secretary, Gladstone's nephew and Hartington's brother Lord Frederick Cavendish, crossed to Ireland on 5 May, but Cavendish and the permanent under-secretary, Thomas Henry Burke, were murdered by extremist Irish nationalists the next day in Phoenix Park, Dublin, while walking to the Viceregal Lodge where Spencer was staying. Spencer, assisted by George Trevelyan, his new secretary, was now faced with the difficult task of pacifying Ireland. Spencer acted quickly to reform the Irish police forces and destroy the secret societies which had been responsible for the murders.

He attracted heavy criticism for his poor handling of a group of murders in Maamtrasna – one of the supposed criminals, Myles Joyce, had been hanged while still proclaiming his innocence, leading to a great deal of condemnation of Spencer from Irish Nationalist sources. The end of Spencer's second tenure as viceroy saw the successful visit of the Prince and Princess of Wales to Ireland, but Spencer's efforts to get the Queen to agree to the creation of a royal residence in Ireland were unsuccessful.

== Political career, 1885–1905 ==
By 1885, Gladstone's second government was in a very weak position, largely as a result of the death of Charles Gordon, and Spencer's efforts to renew the Irish Crimes Act and secure passage of a land purchase bill ran into opposition from the radicals in the Cabinet - Joseph Chamberlain and Sir Charles Dilke - who hoped to use the opportunity of the legislation to pass a greater measure of local self-government for Ireland. The issue remained up in the air when Gladstone's government fell in early June. During the interval between the fall of Gladstone's second government and the beginning of his third, in February 1886, Spencer became a convert to Irish Home Rule, unlike most of the other leading Whigs, who deserted to Liberal Unionism. Spencer would serve as Lord President in Gladstone's third government, and was instrumental in the formulation of Gladstone's home rule legislation. After the defeat of the bill, Spencer joined his chief in opposition. Spencer's position on home rule led to his social ostracism by other members of his class, including the Queen herself, and spent much of his period in opposition getting his personal finances in order. He also acted from 1888 as chairman of the Northamptonshire County Council, and continued to work with Gladstone and other liberal leaders in determining the shape of a home rule bill in the next liberal government.

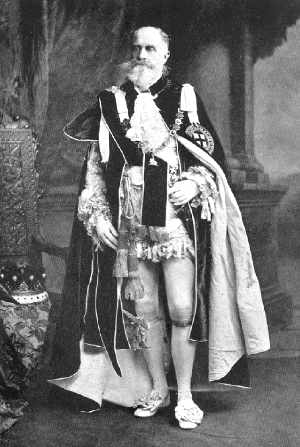
Lord Spencer in the robes of a Knight of the Garter

When the Liberals returned to power in August 1892, Spencer was appointed First Lord of the Admiralty. Gladstone's opposition to Spencer's policy, following the recommendations of the Sea Lords, of naval expansion, led to Gladstone's final resignation in March 1894. Gladstone himself nonetheless hoped that Spencer would be his successor, but the Queen did not seek his advice, and chose Lord Rosebery instead. Spencer continued to serve under Rosebery, and went out when the Liberal government fell in June 1895. In his later years, Spencer remained active in politics. Spencer was a key support for the Liberal leader in the Commons, Henry Campbell-Bannerman (who had previously been Spencer's Chief Secretary at the end of his second vice-regency) during the Boer War, holding to the Liberal leader's middle course between the active anti-war position of the Radicals and the pro-war position of Rosebery's Liberal Imperialists. Following Lord Kimberley's death in 1902, Spencer was elected Liberal leader in the House of Lords. Despite health problems, he was rumoured as late as February 1905 to be a potential candidate for Liberal prime minister should the Liberals soon return to power, as by then seemed likely as a result of the Unionist split over tariff reform. However, on 11 October of that year he suffered a major stroke which ended his political career, only two months shy of the Liberals' return to power.

== Rifle Volunteers ==
An invasion scare in 1859 led to a War Office decision to call for local Volunteer Corps to be established. The War Office issued a Circular Letter on 12 May inviting volunteers, and within three days Spencer had offered to raise a company from his tenants at Althorp. It became the 1st (Althorp Rifles) Northamptonshire Rifle Volunteer Corps with Spencer appointed to command in the rank of captain on 29 August 1859.

The 1st Northampton RVC sang a song to the tune of The British Grenadiers:

Now every man of sense, Sir,
Should welcome with three cheers
And rally round Lord Spencer
and the Althorp Volunteers.

After the separate Northamptonshire RVCs were formed into an administrative battalion the following year, Spencer was promoted to major on 2 April 1861. When the battalion held its annual camp at Althorp in 1864, Spencer's hospitality included providing his own cook to direct the officers' mess.

Also in 1859, Spencer was a leading member of the committee that established the National Rifle Association, and hosted the committee's meetings at Spencer House. The Association's first competitive meetings were held at Wimbledon Common, part of Spencer's manor of Wimbledon. In 1867 he served on a War Office committee to investigate breech-loading rifles.

Lord Spencer was appointed to the honorary colonelcy of the Northamptonshire Imperial Yeomanry (later the Northamptonshire Yeomanry) on 21 May 1902.

== Other public appointments ==
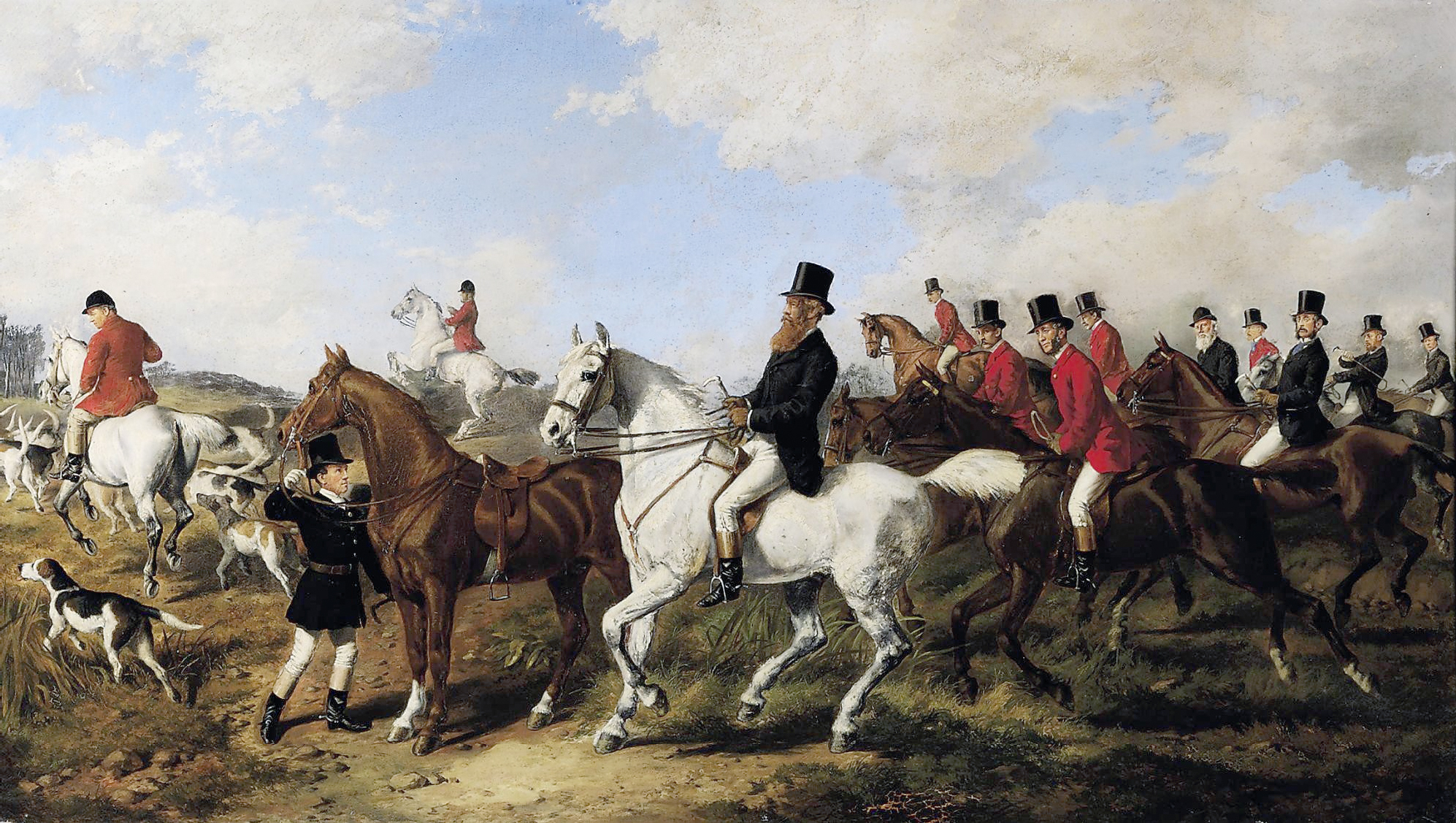
M. A. Hayes, Poyntz with the Ward Union Hunt (1877)

In 1865 Spencer chaired a royal commission on cattle plague, alongside Lord Cranborne, Robert Lowe and Lyon Playfair.

Lord Spencer was Chancellor of Manchester's Victoria University (1892-1904).

During a visit to Exeter on 12 July 1902, he was presented with the Freedom of the Borough of Exeter.

== Courtier ==
Spencer served, for most of the period from 1859 to 1866, in the royal household, as a groom first to Prince Albert and then to the Prince of Wales. In 1876 he hosted Empress Elisabeth of Austria who had come to Northamptonshire for a hunting party. The empress stayed at Easton Neston, which she rented through her sister, ex-queen Maria of the Two Sicilies.

== Personal life ==
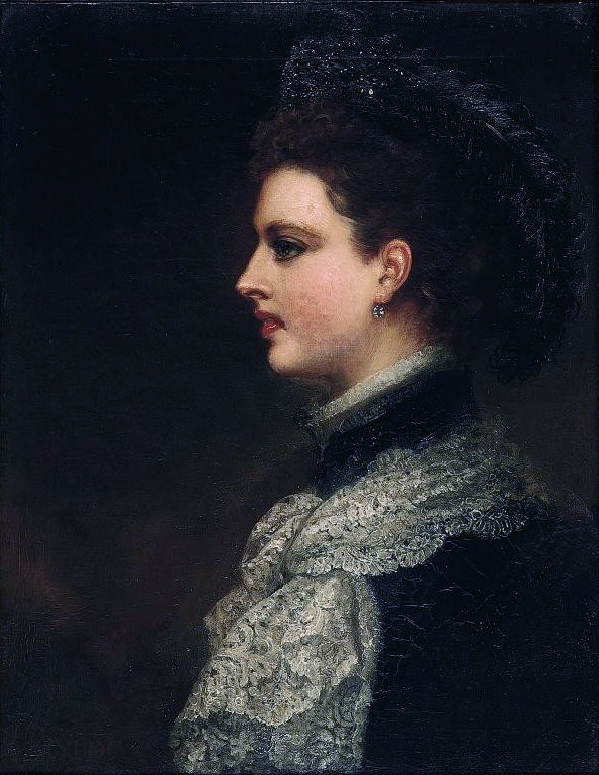
Louis William Desanges, Portrait of Charlotte, Countess Spencer (1835–1903)

Lord Spencer married Charlotte Seymour, daughter of Frederick Charles William Seymour and granddaughter of Lord Hugh Seymour, on 8 July 1858. The marriage was recorded as childless. Lady Spencer died in October 1903, aged 68. Spencer died at Althorp in August 1910, aged 74, and was succeeded by his half-brother, Charles.

In 1864, Spencer, as lord of the manor of Wimbledon through his ownership of Wimbledon House, attempted to get a private parliamentary bill to enclose Wimbledon Common for the creation of a new park with a house and gardens and to sell part for building. In a landmark decision for English common land, and following an enquiry, permission was refused and a board of conservators was established in 1871 to take ownership of the common and preserve it in its natural condition.

== Coat of arms ==
Coat of arms of John Spencer, 5th Earl Spencer
Coronet A Coronet of an Earl Crest Out of a Ducal Coronet Or a Griffin's Head Azure gorged with a Bar Gemelle Gules between two Wings expanded of the second Escutcheon Quarterly 1st and 4th quarterly Argent and Gules a fret Or overall on a bend Sable three escallops of the first a crescent for difference in centre chief Sable (Spencer); 2nd and 3rd barry of eight Or and Gules (Poyntz) Supporters Dexter: A Griffin per fess Ermine and Erminois gorged with a Collar Sable the edges flory-counterflory and chained of the last and on the Collar three Escallops Argent; Sinister: A Wyvern Erect on his tail Ermine similarly collared and chained Motto Dieu Defend Le Droit (God defend the right)

== Ancestry ==
Ancestors of John Spencer, 5th Earl Spencer

8. John Spencer, 1st Earl Spencer
4. George Spencer, 2nd Earl Spencer
9. Georgiana Poyntz
2. Frederick Spencer, 4th Earl Spencer
10. Charles Bingham, 1st Earl of Lucan
5. Lady Lavinia Bingham
11. Margaret Smith
1. John Spencer, 5th Earl Spencer
12. William Poyntz
6. William Stephen Poyntz
13. Isabella Courtenay
3. Georgiana Poyntz
14. Anthony Browne, 7th Viscount Montagu
7. Hon. Elizabeth Mary Browne
15. Frances Mackworth

== Notes ==
Parliament of the United Kingdom
Preceded by Richard Howard-Vyse; Rainald Knightley	Member of Parliament for South Northamptonshire; March 1857 – December 1857; With: Rainald Knightley	Succeeded by Henry Cartwright; Rainald Knightley
Political offices
Preceded by The Duke of Abercorn	Lord Lieutenant of Ireland; 1868–1874	Succeeded by The Duke of Abercorn
Preceded by The Duke of Richmond	Lord President of the Council; 1880–1883	Succeeded by The Lord Carlingford
Preceded by The Earl Cowper	Lord Lieutenant of Ireland; 1882–1885	Succeeded by The Earl of Carnarvon
Preceded by The Viscount Cranbrook	Lord President of the Council; 1886	Succeeded by The Viscount Cranbrook
Preceded by Lord George Hamilton	First Lord of the Admiralty; 1892–1895	Succeeded by George Goschen
Party political offices
Preceded by The Earl of Kimberley	Leader of the Liberals in the House of Lords; 1902–1905	Succeeded by The Marquess of Ripon
Preceded by The Earl of Kimberley; Sir Henry Campbell-Bannerman	Leader of the British Liberal Party; 1902–1905 with Sir Henry Campbell-Bannerman	Succeeded by Sir Henry Campbell-Bannerman
Honorary titles
Preceded by The Lord Southampton	Lord Lieutenant of Northamptonshire; 1872–1908	Succeeded by The Viscount Althorp
Preceded by The Duke of Rutland	Senior Privy Counsellor; 1906–1910; With: The Earl of Ducie	Succeeded by The Earl of Ducie
Peerage of Great Britain
Preceded by Frederick Spencer	Earl Spencer; 1857–1910; Member of the House of Lords (1857–1910)	Succeeded by Charles Spencer
