= Eydon =

Village in Northamptonshire, England

Coordinates: 52.1463°N 1.2095°W

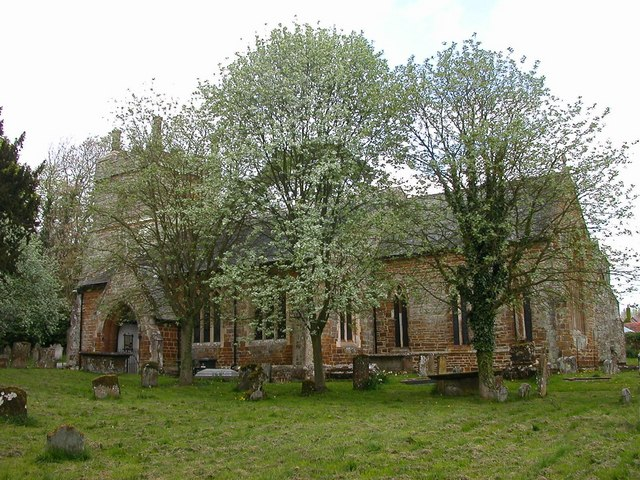
- St Nicholas' parish church

- Location within Northamptonshire
- Population: 422 (2011 Census)
- OS grid reference: SP5450
  - London: 73 miles (117 km)
- Civil parish: Eydon
- Unitary authority: West Northamptonshire
- Ceremonial county: Northamptonshire
- Region: East Midlands
- Country: England
- Sovereign state: United Kingdom
- Post town: Daventry
- Postcode district: NN11
- Dialling code: 01327
- Police: Northamptonshire
- Fire: Northamptonshire
- Ambulance: East Midlands
- UK Parliament: Daventry
- Website: Eydon Parish Council

Eydon is a village and civil parish in West Northamptonshire, about 8 miles (13 km) north-east of Banbury. The village is between 510 and 540 feet (160 m) above sea level on the east side of a hill, which rises to 580 feet (180 m) and is the highest point in the parish. The parish is bounded to the west by the River Cherwell, to the south by a stream that is one of its tributaries, and to the east and north by field boundaries.

The villages name means 'Aega's hill'.

The 2011 Census recorded a parish population of 422.

== Manor ==
In the 11th and 12th centuries the manor of Eydon was assessed at two hides. The Domesday Book of 1086 recorded that one Hugh held "Egedone" of Hugh de Grandmesnil. In the 12th century Richard Fitz Wale held "Aydona" of the fee of Leicester.

== Eydon Hall ==
Eydon Hall is a stately home that was built in 1789–91. It is a Grade I listed building.

== Parish church ==
The oldest part of the Church of England parish church of Saint Nicholas is the Norman baptismal font. A north aisle of two bays was added to the nave early in the 13th century. The west tower was added early in the 14th century. The north windows and (now blocked) doorway of the north aisle and the south windows of the chancel are 14th century Decorated Gothic. The west window of the north aisle is late medieval, being late Perpendicular Gothic.

In 1864–5 the church was restored under the direction of the Gothic Revival architect R.C. Hussey. Hussey added a south aisle, extended the north aisle eastwards to four bays, added a northeast vestry, and moved to the vestry a recumbent effigy of a lady that dates from about 1340. The church's other notable monument is a wall-mounted tablet in grey and white marble to Rev. Francis Annesley, who died in 1811. It was carved by John Bacon the younger and it is now in the south aisle. In the windows of the north aisle are some stained glass heraldic shields made in about 1830.

The west tower has a ring of six bells. One of the Newcombe family of bellfounders of Leicester cast the fifth bell in 1603. Matthew III Bagley of Chacombe cast the second bell in 1770. John Briant of Hertford cast the third bell in 1822. John Taylor & Co of Loughborough cast the tenor bell in 1872 and the treble and fourth bells in 1981.

St Nicholas' is a Grade II* listed building. The parish is part of the Benefice of Aston le Walls, Byfield, Boddington, Eydon and Woodford Halse.

== Economic history ==
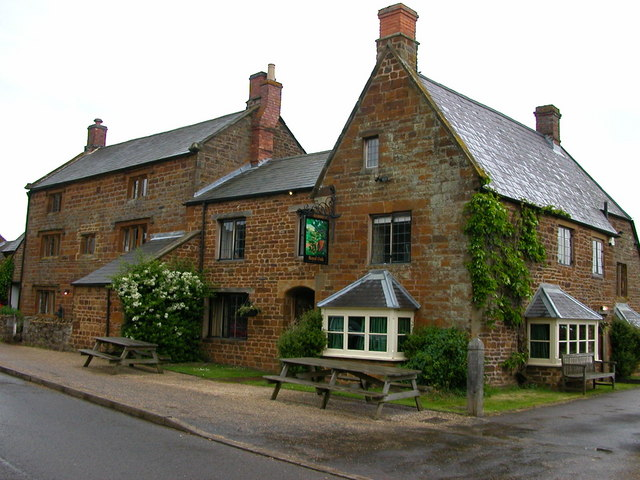
The 17th-century Royal Oak pub

The Domesday Book of 1086 recorded that Eydon had "a mill". In medieval usage this usually meant a watermill.

The village has an unusual layout of two streets in parallel (High Street and Lime Avenue). Lime Avenue now has gaps and fields between some houses on its west side, but earthworks suggest that in earlier centuries cottages were continuous on both sides.

Eydon Inclosure Act 1760
- Act of Parliament
- Parliament of Great Britain
- Long title: An Act for dividing and enclosing the Common Fields, Common Pastures, Common Meadows, Common Grounds, Grange Lands, and Waste Grounds, of and in the Manor and Parish of Eydon, in the County of Northampton.
- Citation: 1 Geo. 3. c. 10 Pr.
- Territorial extent: Great Britain

Dates
- Royal assent: 3 March 1761
- Commencement: 26 October 1760 (Note: Start of session.)

Status: Current legislation

Traces of traditional ridge and furrow ploughing survive in much of the parish, many in the S-shaped pattern characteristic of ox-drawn ploughs. They are evidence of the open field system of farming that prevailed in the parish until 1760, when Parliament passed the Eydon Inclosure Act 1760 (1 Geo. 3. c. 10 Pr.).

Northwest of the village, west of Woodford Road and Manitoba Way, are 20 acres (8 ha) of shallow hollows and mounds. They are the remains of small pits and spoil heaps created by the quarrying of Northampton Sand, an iron-rich sandstone, probably in the Middle Ages.

In 1872 the Northampton and Banbury Junction Railway (from 1910 part of the Stratford-upon-Avon and Midland Junction Railway (SMJR)) was opened between Blisworth and Farthinghoe. It passed through the east of Eydon parish about 3/5-mile (1 km) northeast of the village. Its nearest stations were at Morton Pinkney and Byfield, each of which was about 2 1/4 miles (4 km) away.

In the 1899 the Great Central Main Line to London Marylebone was built through the same part of Eydon parish, passing about 700 yards (640 m) northeast of the village. Its nearest station was at Woodford and Hinton (later renamed Woodford Halse), about 1 1/2 miles (2.4 km) north of Eydon. British Railways closed the SMJR line in 1951, Woodford Halse station in 1963 and the GC main line in 1966.

== Amenities ==
Eydon has a 17th-century public house, the Royal Oak.

== Gallery ==
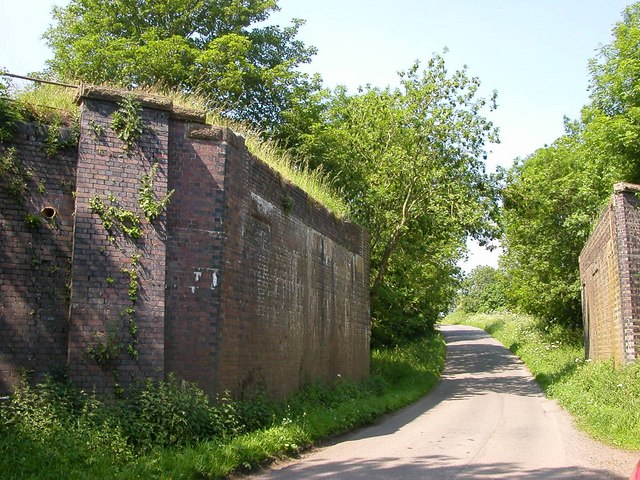
Abutments of a former bridge on the abandoned Great Central Main Line over the minor road to Canons Ashby

== Bibliography ==
- Adkins, W.R.D.; Serjeantson, R.M., eds. (1902). A History of the County of Northampton. Victoria County History. Vol. 1. Westminster: Archibald Constable & Co. pp. 331, 370.
- Pevsner, Nikolaus; Cherry, Bridget (revision) (1973) [1961]. Northamptonshire. The Buildings of England (2nd ed.). Harmondsworth: Penguin Books. p. 211. ISBN 0-14-071022-1.
- RCHME, ed. (1982). "Eydon". An Inventory of the Historical Monuments in the County of Northamptonshire. Vol. 4 – Archaeological sites in South-West Northamptonshire. London: Royal Commission on the Historical Monuments of England. p. 53.
