= Viscount Dilhorne =

Title in the Peerage of the United Kingdom

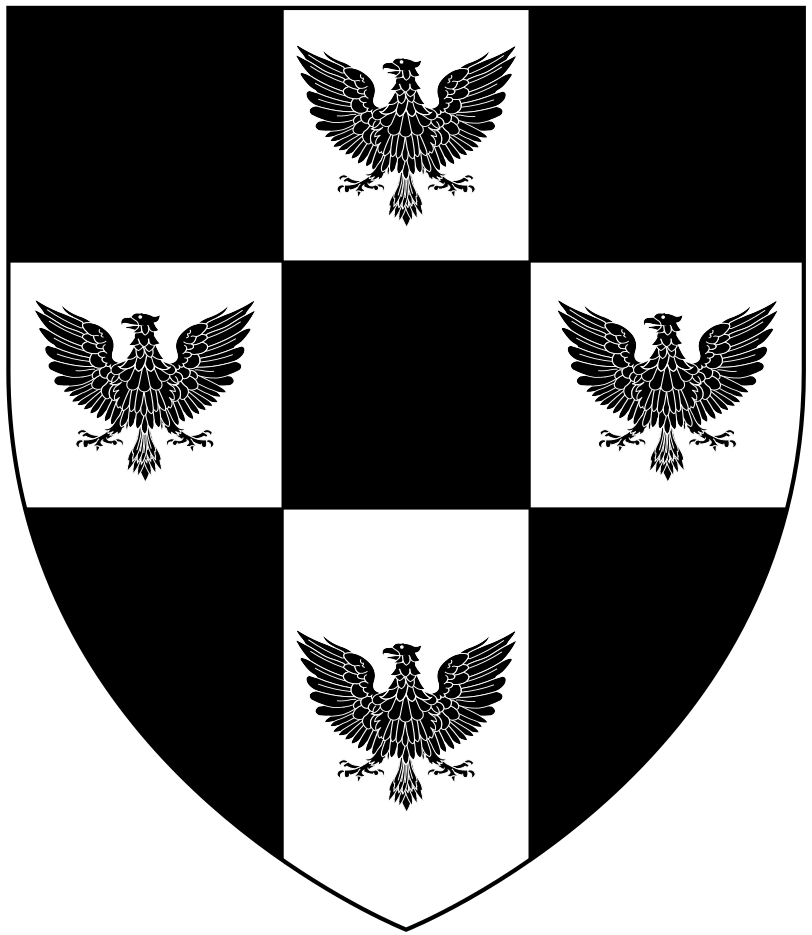
Arms of Buller: Sable, on a cross argent quarter pierced of the field four eagles displayed of the first

Viscount Dilhorne, of Greens Norton in the County of Northampton, is a title in the Peerage of the United Kingdom. It was created on 7 December 1964 for the lawyer, Conservative politician and former Lord Chancellor, Reginald Manningham-Buller, 1st Baron Dilhorne. He had already succeeded his father as fourth Baronet of Dilhorne and been created Baron Dilhorne, of Towcester in the County of Northampton on 17 July 1962, also in the Peerage of the United Kingdom.

The Manningham-Buller baronetcy, of Dilhorne in the County of Stafford, was created in the Baronetage of the United Kingdom on 20 January 1866 for the first Viscount's great-grandfather Edward Buller-Yarde-Buller, who legally changed his name to Manningham-Buller the same year. He represented Staffordshire North and Stafford in Parliament. Manningham-Buller was the third son of Sir Francis Buller, 2nd Baronet, of Churston Court, whose eldest son, the third Baronet, was created Baron Churston in 1858. His grandson, the third Baronet, sat as a Conservative Member of Parliament for Kettering and Northampton. He was succeeded by his eldest son, the aforementioned fourth Baronet, who was elevated to the peerage as Viscount Dilhorne. As of 2022, the titles are held by the latter's grandson, the third Viscount, who succeeded in 2022.

Eliza Manningham-Buller, Baroness Manningham-Buller, a life peer and former Director General of MI5, is the second daughter of the first Viscount.

The family seat is The Dower House at Minterne Parva, near Dorchester, Dorset.

== Manningham-Buller (formerly Buller-Yarde-Buller) baronets, of Dilhorne (1866) ==
- Sir Edward Manningham-Buller, 1st Baronet (1800–1882)
- Sir Morton Edward Manningham-Buller, 2nd Baronet (1825–1910)
- Sir Mervyn Edward Manningham-Buller, 3rd Baronet (1876–1956)
- Sir Reginald Edward Manningham-Buller, 4th Baronet (1905–1980) (created Baron Dilhorne in 1962)

=== Baron Dilhorne (1962) ===
- Reginald Edward Manningham-Buller, 1st Baron Dilhorne (1905–1980) (created Viscount Dilhorne in 1964)

=== Viscount Dilhorne (1964) ===
- Reginald Edward Manningham-Buller, 1st Viscount Dilhorne (1905–1980)
- John Mervyn Manningham-Buller, 2nd Viscount Dilhorne (1932–2022)
- James Edward Manningham-Buller, 3rd Viscount Dilhorne (born 1956)

The heir apparent is the present holder's son, Hon. Edward John Manningham-Buller (born 1990).

=== Male-line family tree ===
Male-line family tree, Manningham-Buller baronets and Viscounts Dilhorne.

Sir Edward Manningham-Buller; 1st Baronet; 1800–1882
Sir Morton Manningham-Buller; 2nd Baronet; 1825–1910	Maj. Gen. Edmund Manningham-Buller; 1828–1897
Sir Mervyn Manningham-Buller; 3rd Baronet; 1876–1956
Baron Dilhorne; Viscount Dilhorne
Reginald Manningham-Buller; 1st Viscount Dilhorne; 1905–1980
John Manningham-Buller; 2nd Viscount Dilhorne; 1932–2022
James Manningham-Buller; 3rd Viscount Dilhorne born 1956
Hon. Edward Manningham-Buller born 1990

== See also ==
- James Buller
- Baron Churston
- Baroness Manningham-Buller
