= Fairfax Cartwright (British politician) =

British politician (1823–1881)

Fairfax William Cartwright (14 May 1823 – 2 February 1881) was an academic, soldier and Conservative politician who sat in the House of Commons from 1868 to 1881.

Cartwright was the eldest son of Lieutenant-General William Cartwright of Flore House, Weedon, Northamptonshire and his wife Mary Anne Jones, only daughter and heiress of Henry Jones. He was educated at Christ Church, Oxford where he graduated B.A. in 1844, and subsequently became a Fellow of All Souls. He served in the Austrian Army for a while, and was later major in the 2nd Hussars British German Legion which was raised for service in the Crimean War. He was a J.P. and a Deputy Lieutenant of Northamptonshire.

At the 1868 general election, Cartwright was elected as Member of Parliament (MP) for South Northamptonshire and held the seat until his death in 1881, unmarried. He was one of the most active campaigners for police superannuation.

Parliament of the United Kingdom
| Preceded by Rainald Knightley; Henry Cartwright | Member of Parliament for Northamptonshire South; 1868–1881; With: Rainald Knightley | Succeeded by Rainald Knightley; Pickering Phipps |
