= Rainald Knightley, 1st Baron Knightley =

British Conservative Party politician

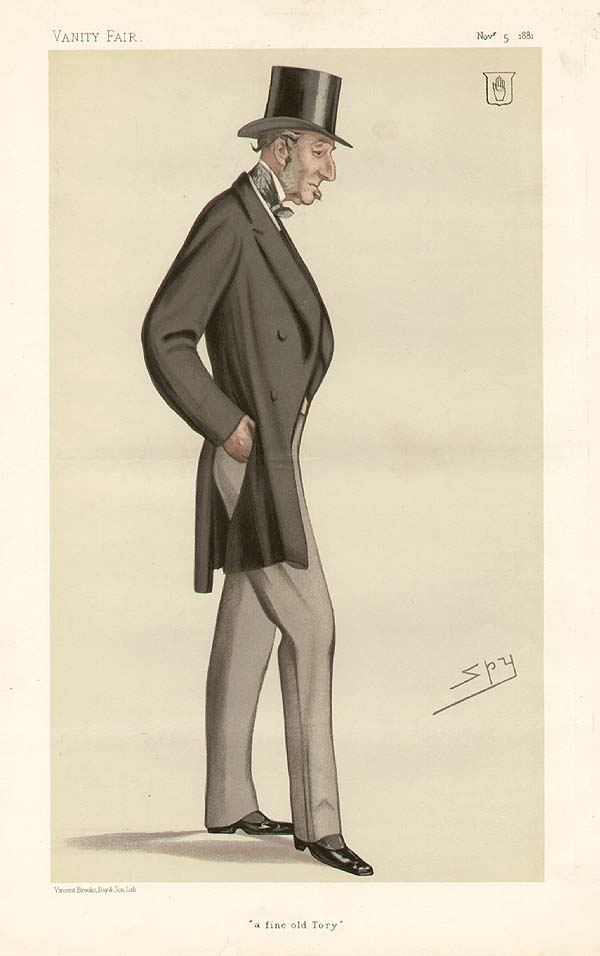
"a fine old Tory" Knightley as caricatured by Spy (Leslie Ward) in Vanity Fair, November 1881

Arms of Knightley: Quarterly ermine and paly of six or and gules

Rainald Knightley, 1st Baron Knightley (22 October 1819 – 19 December 1895), known as Sir Rainald Knightley, 3rd Baronet, from 1864 to 1892, was a British Conservative Party politician.

== Origins ==
Knightley was the son of Sir Charles Knightley, 2nd Baronet of Fawsley, and his wife Selina Mary, daughter of F. L. Hervey. In 1864 he inherited the baronetcy and the Fawsley estate on the death of his father.

The prominent de Knightley family originated at the Staffordshire manor of Knightley, acquired by them shortly after the Norman Conquest of 1066. The Domesday Book of 1086 lists the tenant of Chenistelei as Rainald, namely "Reginald the Sheriff", who held 88 manors throughout England, said to be the ancestor of this family. Mark Noble (1787) wrote of the de Knightley family:

There is no private family in the kingdom has given more knights; none which has been more numerous in its branches; some of them have almost rivalled the eldest in consequence, and that fettled in France surpassed them, having many centuries ago been declared noble; the alliances they have contracted have been equal to themselves, and the many high offices held by them in the state, have been exceeded only by the very large possessions they have constantly had.

In 1415 Sir Richard Knightley purchased the manor of Fawsley in Northamptonshire, where the senior line of the family became seated.

== Political career ==
Knightley entered Parliament for Northamptonshire South in 1852 (succeeding his father), a seat he held until 1892. In 1892 he was raised to the peerage as Baron Knightley, of Fawsley in the County of Northampton.

== Personal life ==
Lord Knightley married Louisa Mary, daughter of General Sir Edward Bowater, in 1869. The marriage was childless. He died in December 1895, aged 76, when the barony became extinct. He was succeeded in the baronetcy by his first cousin Valentine Knightley. Lady Knightley died in October 1913.

Parliament of the United Kingdom
| Preceded by Sir Charles Knightley, Bt; Richard Howard-Vyse | Member of Parliament for Northamptonshire South; 1852–1892; With: Richard Howard-Vyse 1852–1857; Viscount Althorp 1857–1858; Henry Cartwright 1858–1868; Fairfax Cartwright 1868–1881; Pickering Phipps 1881–1885 | Succeeded by David Guthrie |
Peerage of the United Kingdom
| New creation | Baron Knightley; 1892–1895 | Extinct |
Baronetage of the United Kingdom
| Preceded by Charles Knightley | Baronet (of Fawsley); 1864–1895 | Succeeded by Valentine Knightley |
