= Charlotte Spencer, Countess Spencer =

British philanthropist (1835–1903)

The Right Honourable The Countess Spencer VA
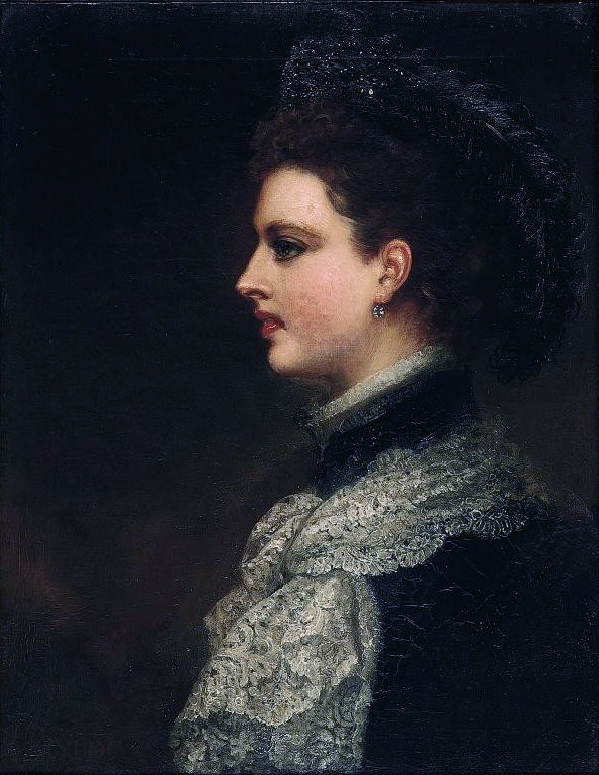
- Painting of Lady Spencer by the French artist Louis William Desanges
- Born: Charlotte Frances Frederica Seymour; 28 September 1835; St James's Square, London
- Died: 31 October 1903 (aged 68)
- Burial place: St Mary the Virgin Church, Great Brington, Northamptonshire
- Spouse: John Spencer, 5th Earl Spencer (m. 1858)
- Parent(s): Frederick Seymour; Lady Augusta Hervey

Charlotte Frances Frederica Spencer, Countess Spencer, VA (née Seymour; 28 September 1835 – 31 October 1903) was a British philanthropist. Born in the London residence of her maternal grandfather, the 1st Marquess of Bristol, she was the youngest daughter of Frederick Charles William Seymour and his second wife Lady Augusta Hervey. In 1858 Charlotte married John Spencer, 5th Earl Spencer; they had no children.

Lady Spencer was active in philanthropic causes. In the 1860s she founded the Supplemental Ladies Association, an organisation of upper-class women that "adopted" missions within poorer areas of the East End of London and allowed them to appeal directly to the group for material aid. She later published a book documenting her observations of this work.

== Early life and family ==
Charlotte Frances Frederica Seymour was born on 28 September 1835 in the London residence of her maternal grandfather, Frederick Hervey, 1st Marquess of Bristol. Her mother, Lady Augusta, was Bristol's eldest daughter. Her father, Frederick Charles William Seymour, was a younger son of Lord Hugh Seymour, an admiral in the Royal Navy. Charlotte had two half-siblings from her father's first marriage to Lady Mary Gordon, and five full siblings from his second marriage to Lady Augusta. She and her two full sisters were all considered beautiful by London society; one sister married Henry Agar-Ellis, 3rd Viscount Clifden and the other wedded Lord Charles Bruce.

Lady Augusta, herself a lover of science, encouraged her daughters to read books on serious subjects such as botany, geography, and natural science. Frequent visits to the National Gallery and the Vernon Gallery fostered in Charlotte a love of art, and she was fond of music and history. Languages were another focus of Charlotte's education; under the care of foreign governesses, she eventually became fluent in French and German.

== Marriage ==
Charlotte Seymour made her London season debut in 1854, but remained unmarried. That same year, she met John Spencer, Viscount Althorp. In May 1858 John, now 5th Earl Spencer, proposed to her. On 8 July, they married at St James's Church, Piccadilly in a crowded ceremony officiated by her uncle Lord Arthur Hervey, rector of Ickworth. The couple had a previous family connection through the earl's stepmother Adelaide, as she was Charlotte's cousin. He had inherited the earldom the previous year at the age of twenty-two, upon the death of his father, the 4th Earl Spencer.

A politician from the Liberal Party, the earl was a close friend of the Prime Minister William Ewart Gladstone and served in his cabinet. Charlotte's family, including her maternal grandfather, were strongly affiliated with the Conservative Party. Despite this, Charlotte supported her husband during his political years and was outspoken with her views; her diaries contain memoranda on Fenianism and the Eastern Question.

The Spencers were connected with the British royal family. From the late 1850s to mid-1860s, the earl held the position of Groom of the Stool to Prince Albert and then to Edward, Prince of Wales. The latter made his first visit to Althorp, the Spencer family seat, in 1863. The following year, Lord and Lady Spencer accompanied the Prince and Princess of Wales to Denmark. The Spencers were entrusted with the care of their infant son Prince Albert Victor, when the baby was required to return to England on the royal yacht during the trip.

Lord and Lady Spencer had no children. She died on 31 October 1903, and was buried at the parish church of St Mary the Virgin in Great Brington, Northamptonshire. Her husband died on 13 August 1910 and was buried beside her. He was succeeded by his half-brother Charles as the next Earl Spencer. During her lifetime, Lady Spencer was the subject of many paintings, including one by the French artist Louis William Desanges that was painted at Althorp. In 1907, her memoirs were published.

== Philanthropy ==
Lady Spencer was a member of the exclusive Ladies Diocesan Association, an aristocratic philanthropic organisation formed in the mid-1860s and based in London. Upon joining, each member was assigned a location and expected to undertake charitable tasks on a weekly basis during their time in the city; for example, two ladies were assigned to a workhouse in Whitechapel. Due to the high status of its members, the group had many political connections and was able to submit specific details to those in government about the state of workhouses in London. The group's efforts to help the city's poorer areas extended into the twentieth century.

Another charitable organisation of which Lady Spencer was a member was the Parochial Mission-Women Association. In 1868, they asked her to "adopt" a mission in a poverty-stricken area of London and allow its staff to apply to her directly when in desperate need of aid. Lady Spencer quickly realised how badly the mission needed resources, which led her to recruit other members and create an affiliated organisation called the Supplemental Ladies Association. Its focus was to devote resources to parishes located in the East End of London; such items included "outfits for girls going into service, or families willing to emigrate". Several years later, she published a book documenting her observations entitled East and West. It was intended to show "the toiling, struggling poor in the East that amid glitter, wealth, and luxury of the West, there are many who sympathise with their sorrows, and who are ready and willing to help them in their distress," she wrote in 1870.
