= William Cartwright (British Army officer, died 1873) =

British Army officer (1797–1873)

General William Cartwright
- Born: 28 February 1797
- Died: 5 June 1873 (aged 76)
- Military career
- Allegiance: United Kingdom
- Branch: British Army
- Rank: General
- Conflicts: Napoleonic Wars

General William Cartwright (28 February 1797 – 5 June 1873) was a British Army officer.

== Military career ==
Born the son of William Ralph Cartwright MP and Emma Mary Maude Cartwright, Cartwright served in the 61st (South Gloucestershire) Regiment of Foot and then in the 3rd Dragoons and then the 10th Hussars. He was present at the Battle of the Pyrenees in July 1813, the Battle of Nivelle in November 1813 and the Battle of the Nive in December 1813 as well as the Battle of Waterloo in June 1815. He was buried at St Michael Churchyard, Aynho, Northamptonshire.
