= Anthony Henley, 3rd Baron Henley =

British peer and Liberal Member of Parliament

Anthony Henley Henley, 3rd Baron Henley, 1st Baron Northington MP (né Eden; 12 April 1825 – 27 November 1898) was a British peer and Liberal Member of Parliament.

== Early life and education ==
Henley was born Anthony Eden, the son of Hon. Robert Eden and Harriet Peel, daughter of Sir Robert Peel, 1st Baronet, and sister of Prime Minister Sir Robert Peel, 2nd Baronet. Lord Chancellor Robert Henley, 1st Earl of Northington, was his great-grandfather. His grandfather Morton Eden, 1st Baron Henley, was raised to the peerage in 1799. His father succeeded as the second baron in 1831 and the next year changed the family surname to Henley, as eventual heir to his uncle, Robert Henley, 2nd Earl of Northington, who died unmarried in 1786.

He was educated at Eton College and Christ Church, Oxford.

== Career ==
At age 15, Henley succeeded his father as third Baron Henley in 1841 but as this was an Irish peerage, it did not entitle him to a seat in the House of Lords.

He was instead elected to the House of Commons for Northampton in 1859, a seat he held until 1874. In 1885 the Northington title held by his great-grandfather was revived when he was created Baron Northington, of Watford in the County of Northampton, in the Peerage of the United Kingdom. This title gave him and the later Barons an automatic seat in the House of Lords.

He was appointed High Sheriff of Northamptonshire for 1854.

== Marriages and issue ==
Lord Henley married, firstly, Julia Emily Augusta, daughter of the Very Rev. John Peel, Dean of Worcester, in 1846. They had six children:

- Hon. Florence Mary (9 May 1848 – 28 May 1866), died unmarried
- Hon. Frederick Henley (17 April 1849 – 23 December 1923), succeeded his father as 4th Baron Henley; married Augusta Frederica Langham (1847–1905), sister of Sir Herbert Hay Langham, 12th Baronet; died without children
- Hon. Gertrude Augusta (7 November 1851 – 14 November 1932)
- Hon. Evelyn (18 October 1853 – 14 December 1910), married in 1881, John Langham Reed
- Hon. Charles (born and died 5 October 1855); baptism performed by his grandfather Rev. Peel
- Hon. Hon. Anthony Ernest Henley (2 July 1858 – 23 October 1925), succeeded elder brother in 1923 as 5th Baron Henley; married firstly in 1882, Georgiana Caroline Mary (1859–1888), only daughter of Lt. Col. Richard Michael Williams; married secondly in 1889, Emmeline Stuart, youngest daughter of George Gammie Maitland; died without male issue

Lady Henley died in 1862. In 1870, he married, secondly, Clara Campbell Lucy, daughter of Joseph Henry Storie Jekyll. They had three children:

- Hon. Harriet Adelaide Louisa (16 April 1871 – 28 March 1879), died in childhood
- Brig.-Gen. Hon. Anthony Morton CMG DSO (4 August 1873 – 17 May 1925); married in 1906 Hon. Sylvia Laura Stanley OBE, third daughter of Edward Stanley, 4th Baron Stanley of Alderley, and had four daughters.
- Hon. Francis Robert (11 April 1877 – 21 April 1962), succeeded elder half-brother in 1925 as 6th Baron Henley; married in 1913 Lady Dorothy Georgiana Howard, third daughter of George Howard, 9th Earl of Carlisle

He died in November 1898, aged 73, and was succeeded in his titles by his first-, second-, and fourth-born sons, respectively. Lady Henley died in 1922.

== Arms ==
Coat of arms of Barons Henley
Crest A dexter arm embowed in armour couped at the shoulder proper and grasping a garb or banded vert. Escutcheon Quarterly: 1st and 4th gules, on a chevron argent, between three garbs or, banded vert, as many escallops sable (Eden); 2nd and 3rd Azure, a lion rampant argent, ducally crowned or, within a bordure of the second, charged with eight torteaux (Henley). Supporters Dexter, a lion argent, semée of torteaux, ducally crowned or having a plain collar of the last rimmed azure, on the collar three escallops sable, and pendent therefrom a shield gold, charged with an eagle displayed with two heads sable; Sinister, a stag argent, semée of torteaux, attired or, and gorged with a plain collar of the last rimmed azure, and charged with three escallops sable, pendant therefrom an escutcheon also or, charged with an eagle displayed with one head also sable. Motto Si Sit Prudentia (If there be but prudence).

Parliament of the United Kingdom
Preceded by Robert Vernon; Charles Gilpin	Member of Parliament for Northampton; 1859–1874; With: Charles Gilpin	Succeeded by Charles Gilpin; Pickering Phipps
Honorary titles
Preceded by Cary Charles Elwes	High Sheriff of Northamptonshire; 1854	Succeeded by Frederick Urban Sartoris
Peerage of Ireland
Preceded by Robert Henley	Baron Henley; 1841–1898	Succeeded by Frederick Henley
Peerage of the United Kingdom
New creation	Baron Northington; 1885–1898	Succeeded by Frederick Henley
