= Frederick Smith =

Frederick, Frederic or Fred Smith may refer to:

== Business ==
- Frederick Smith, 1st Baron Colwyn (1859–1946), British businessman
- Frederick Smith, 2nd Viscount Hambleden (1868–1928), British businessman and politician
- Frederic L. Smith (1870–1954), American football player and automobile industry pioneer in Detroit, Michigan
- Frederick Smith, 2nd Baron Colwyn (1914–1966), stockbroker and British Army officer, grandson of the 1st Baron Colwyn
- Frederick W. Smith (1944–2025), American businessman, founder of FedEx

== Entertainment ==
- Frederick Y. Smith (1903–1991), American film editor
- Freddie Smith (born 1988), American television actor

== Literature ==
- Frederick M. Smith (1874–1946), American religious leader and author
- Frederick Smith, 2nd Earl of Birkenhead (1907–1975), British peer and biographer, son of the 1st Earl of Birkenhead
- Frederick E. Smith (1919–2012), British author
- Frederick Smith, 3rd Earl of Birkenhead (1936–1985), British peer and author, son of the 2nd Earl of Birkenhead

== Military ==
- Sir Frederick Smith (British Army officer, born 1790) (1790–1874), British general and colonel-commandant of the Royal Engineers, and Conservative MP for Chatham
- Frederick Augustus Smith (1826–1887), Irish recipient of the Victoria Cross
- Frederick Appleton Smith (1849–1922), U.S. Army general
- Frederick George Smith (1922–1942), Australian private who was killed in the 1942 Dili massacre
- Fred E. Smith (1873–1918), American Medal of Honor recipient
- Frederic H. Smith Jr. (1908–1980), United States Air Force general

== Music ==
- Frederic Jacobs Smith (1882–1932), co-founder of Carrie Jacobs-Bond & Son
- Fred Sledge Smith (1933–2005), American R&B songwriter and record producer
- Fred Smith (bassist) (1948–2026), American bass guitarist best known for his work with Blondie and Television
- Fred "Sonic" Smith (1948–1994), American guitarist with the MC5
- Iain Campbell Smith, Australian folk singer/songwriter and comedian who also performs as Fred Smith

== Politics and law ==
- Frederick Smith (Pennsylvania lawyer) (1773–1830), Pennsylvania lawyer, state attorney general, state Supreme Court justice
- Frederick Chatfield Smith (1823–1905), British member of parliament for North Nottinghamshire, 1868–1880
- Sir Frederick Smith (South African politician) (1861–1926), South African businessman and mayor of Cape Town
- Fred Smith (New Brunswick politician) (1871–1941), member of the Legislative Assembly of New Brunswick
- F. E. Smith, 1st Earl of Birkenhead (Frederick Edwin Smith, 1872–1930), British Conservative statesman, attorney-general and lord chancellor
- Frederick Smith (Australian politician) (1883–1960), Australian politician, government minister in Western Australia
- Frederick Cleveland Smith (1884–1956), U. S. representative from Ohio
- Frederic Gordon Smith (1886–1967), British barrister and colonial judge
- Fred A. Smith (trade unionist) (1887–1943), British trade unionist
- Fred B. Smith (1892–1984), American politician in Mississippi
- Fred J. Smith (1899–1988), member of the Illinois legislature, 1943–1979
- Frederick Plympton Smith (1915–1985), member of the Vermont House of Representatives and Vermont Senate
- Sir Frederick Smith (Barbadian barrister) (1924–2016), attorney general of Barbados and chief justice of Turks and Caicos
- Fred L. Smith (political writer) (1940–2024), American think-tank leader
- Fred Smith (North Carolina politician) (born 1942), American politician; North Carolina legislator and attorney
- Fred Smith (Arkansas politician), former professional basketball player and member of the Arkansas House of Representatives

== Science, technology and medicine ==
- Frederick Smith (entomologist) (1805–1879), British entomologist
- Frederick Porter Smith (1833–1888), British medical missionary to China
- Frederick W. Smith (physician) (1858–1917), health commissioner in Syracuse, New York
- Fredrick George Smith (1872–1956), British mechanical engineer
- G. Frederick Smith (1891–1976), American chemist
- Frederick Viggers Smith (1912–2006), Australian/British psychologist

== Sports ==
=== Association football ===
- Fred Smith (footballer, born 1887) (1887–1957), English footballer with Stockport County, Derby County, Macclesfield and Southampton in the 1900s and 1910s
- Fred Smith (footballer, born 1898) (1898–1971), English footballer with Bury
- Fred Smith (footballer, born 1901) (1901–?), English football centre forward
- Fred Smith (Port Vale footballer) (fl. 1925–1927), English footballer at outside left with Port Vale in the 1920s
- Frederick Smith (footballer) (fl. 1930–1938), English footballer at outside right with Stockport County, Darlington, Exeter City and Gillingham in the 1930s
- Fred Smith (footballer, born 1914) (1914–1982), English footballer with Bury and Bradford
- Fred Smith (footballer, born February 1926) (1926–2005), Scottish footballer with Aberdeen, Hull City, Sheffield United and Millwall
- Fred Smith (footballer, born May 1926) (1926–2017), English footballer with Sheffield United and Grimsby
- Fred Smith (footballer, born 1942) (1942–2020), English footballer with Burnley and Portsmouth

=== Baseball ===
- Fred Smith (1890s pitcher) (1865–1926), American Major League Baseball pitcher
- Fred Smith (1900s pitcher) (1878–1964), American Major League Baseball pitcher
- Fred Smith (infielder) (1891–1961), American Major League Baseball infielder

=== Cricket ===
- Frederick Smith (Barbadian cricketer) (1837–1923), Barbadian cricketer
- Frederick Smith (Somerset cricketer) (1854–1894), English cricketer
- Fred Smith (South African cricketer) (1861–1914), South African Test cricketer
- Fred Smith (cricketer, born 1879) (1879–1905), English cricketer for Yorkshire
- Fred Smith (cricketer, born 1885) (1885–?), English cricketer for Yorkshire

=== Rugby league ===
- Fred Smith (rugby league, born c. 1885), English rugby league footballer of the 1900s and 1910s for Great Britain, England, and Hunslet
- Fred Smith (rugby league, born 1935) (1935–2004), English rugby league footballer of the 1950s and 1960s for Yorkshire, Leeds, and Wakefield Trinity

=== Other sports ===
- Fred L. Smith (coach) (fl. 1897–1907), American football and baseball coach with the University of Illinois and Fordham University
- Fred Smith (snooker player) (fl. 1925–1932), English billiards and snooker player
- Fred A. Smith (jockey) (c. 1913–1951), Cuban-American jockey
- Fred Smith (Australian footballer) (1941–2024), Australian rules footballer
- Freddy Smith (racing driver) (1946–2023), American racing driver
- Fred Smith, skateboarder for the Z-Boys Alva team

== See also ==
- Jonathan Smith (wide receiver) (born 1981), nicknamed "Fast Freddie", American football player
- T. J. Smith (Fredrick Smith, born 1997), American football player
- Frederick Smyth (disambiguation)
