= The Cottage, Charlton, Northamptonshire =

Grade II listed house in South Northamptonshire, United Kingdom

The Cottage
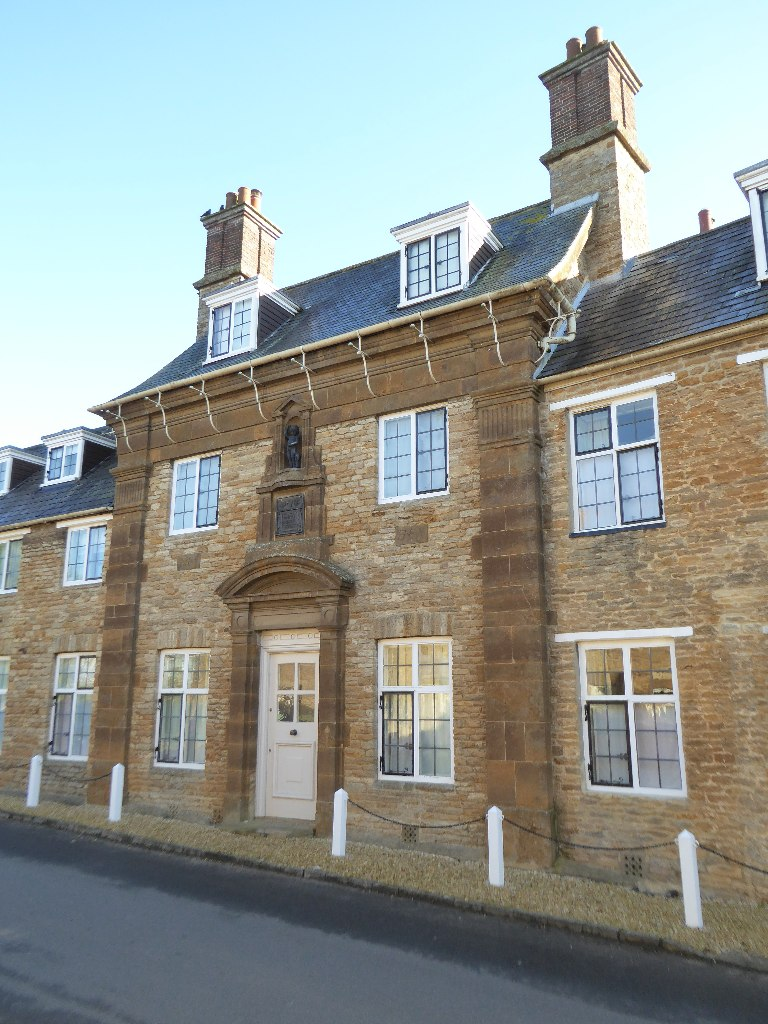

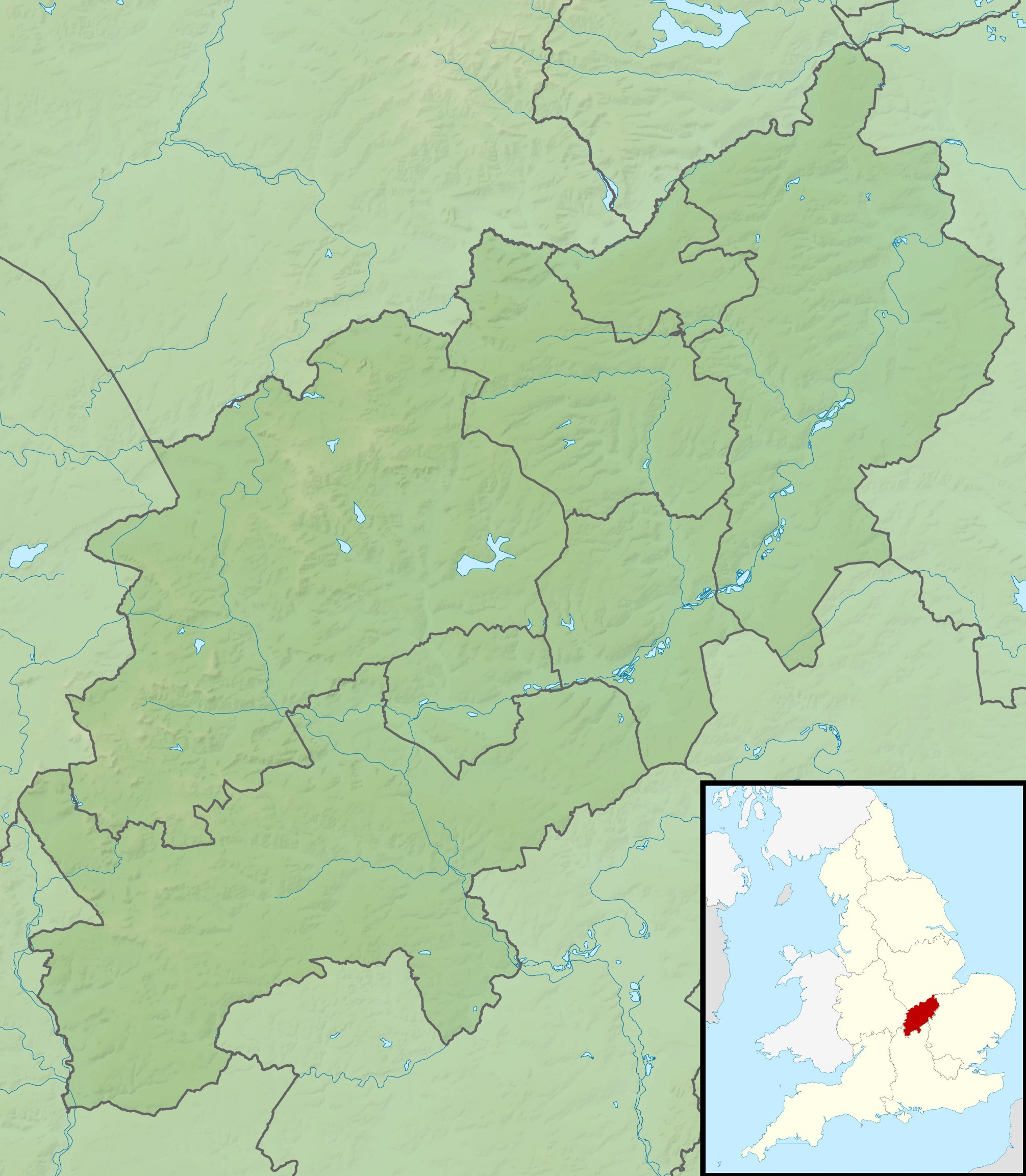
- Location within Northamptonshire
- 52.0189°N 1.232°W
- Type: House
- Location: Charlton, Northamptonshire

History
- Built: 18th & 20th centuries

Site notes
- Architectural style: Vernacular
- Owner: Private

Listed Building – Grade II
- Official name: The Cottage, Newbottle
- Designated: 18 March 1985
- Reference no.: 1265934

The Cottage, Charlton, Northamptonshire, England, is a house of 18th century origins. In 1907 it was bought by F. E. Smith, 1st Earl of Birkenhead as his country home. Smith subsequently purchased another cottage on Main Street in Charlton and engaged Alan James to extend the house in 1911–12. James constructed a large central block to join the two cottages, and remodelled the grounds. Smith entertained at The Cottage throughout his legal and political careers, among his most frequent guests was Winston Churchill, his closest friend. Smith, ennobled as Viscount Furneaux, of Charlton in the County of Northampton, and Earl of Birkenhead in 1922, died of pneumonia caused by cirrhosis of the liver in 1930, aged 58. After cremation at Golders Green Crematorium, his ashes were brought to Charlton and interred in a tomb designed by Edwin Lutyens in the cemetery on Green Lane, just outside of the village. The Cottage remains a private residence and is a Grade II listed building.

== History ==
Frederick Edwin Smith was born in Birkenhead on the Wirral Peninsula in 1872. His grandfather had established a successful estate agency, Smith & Sons, and his father had entered local politics as a Liberal councillor. Smith's ambitions lay in the areas of national politics and Toryism. After reading law at Oxford, he became one of the most eminent, and wealthiest, barristers of his day. In 1906 he entered Parliament, with "the most famous maiden speech ever made in the House of Commons".

FREDERICK EDWIN SMITH P.C., G.C.S.I, D.C.L., LL.D.
FIRST EARL OF BIRKENHEAD
SOMETIME
LORD HIGH CHANCELLOR
SECRETARY OF STATE FOR INDIA
ATTORNEY GENERAL SOLICITOR GENERAL
HIGH STEWARD OF OXFORD UNIVERSITY
FOUR TIMES TREASURER OF GRAYS INN
HIS BY SOVEREIGNTY OF NATURE

— Birkenhead's "characteristically proud" inscription on his tomb at Charlton

The following year Smith bought a cottage on Main Street in Charlton, a small village in the south-west of the county of Northamptonshire, some 18 miles north of Oxford. The origins of what became The Cottage were two farmhouses of 18th century date, built in a vernacular style. After purchasing the first in 1907, Smith bought the second before 1911 and employed Alan James to construct a large central block linking the two. This block contained a "grand library". (Note: Smith had an even grander library at his London home, 32 Grosvenor Gardens. Arnold Bennett recorded his impressions of the Grosvenor Gardens collection and of its owner in 1918; "The library is even equal to his own boastings about it, but he would continually refer to prices".) The house was greatly enlarged in 1911–1912, and continuously developed for the remainder of Smith's life; a swimming pool, tennis courts and stables were added "with the proceeds of every big brief that came his way". Smith's political career saw him become Lord Chancellor in 1919 and Secretary of State for India in 1924. Weekends and summer holidays were spent at Charlton, with guests including his closest friend, Winston Churchill, (Note: After Birkenhead’s early death Churchill spoke at his memorial dinner at the Other Club; “I do not think anyone knew him better than I did, and he was, after all, my dearest friend.” In the foreword to Freddie Birkenhead’s biography of his father, Churchill wrote “F.E. banked his treasure in the hearts of his friends, and they will cherish his memory until their time is come.”) the Duke of York, Cecil Beaton and Alfred Munnings. Smith's alcoholism had been long been among his most notable characteristics and he died, aged 58 in 1930, of pneumonia brought about by cirrhosis. His ashes were interred in a tomb designed by Edwin Lutyens in a small cemetery on Green Lane to the north-west of the village. (Note: Charlton, a “village without church or manor,” forms a parish with Newbottle, a place with a “manor and church but [without] a village”.)

Smith was succeeded in his titles, and at Charlton, by his son, and subsequently his grandson. (Note: Frederick Smith, 2nd Earl of Birkenhead bought the nearby Newbottle Manor in 1960 and this subsequently became the main family home.) Lady Juliet Townsend, Birkenhead's granddaughter, was brought up at the house. The Cottage remains a private residence and was restored in the early 21st century.

== Architecture and description ==
The Cottage is of built of limestone and ironstone rubble, with ironstone dressings. The building is of eleven bays, three in the central block, and three in the wing to the left and five in that to the right. The central block has an elaborate doorcase with Tuscan columns, and a bronze plaque, and a cherub in a niche, above. (Note: The central door onto Main Street was blocked in the 1960s, and a new main entrance created to the side of the house.) Also on the entrance front are stone panels inscribed with the initials F.E.S and M.E.S, denoting Smith and his wife, Margaret. The garden frontage is more asymmetrical, with gables and a veranda. The Cottage is a Grade II listed building.

== Sources ==
- Amery, Colin; Richardson, Margaret; Stamp, Gavin (1981). Lutyens: The Work of the English Architect Sir Edwin Lutyens. London: Arts Council of Great Britain. ISBN 978-0-728-70303-2.
- Bailey, Bruce; Pevsner, Nikolaus; Cherry, Bridget (2013). Northamptonshire. The Buildings Of England. New Haven, US and London: Yale University Press. ISBN 978-0-300-18507-2. OCLC 964790363.
- Campbell, John (1983). F. E. Smith: First Earl of Birkenhead. London: Jonathan Cape. ISBN 978-0-224-01596-7. OCLC 469858530.
- Gilbert, Martin (1976). Winston S. Churchill 1922–1939. Authorised biography of Winston S. Churchill. Vol. V. London: Heinemann. OCLC 715481469.
