= Frederick Birkenhead =

Frederick Birkenhead may refer to:

- Frederick Edwin "F.E." Smith, 1st Earl of Birkenhead (1872–1930), English Conservative statesman; Attorney-General, Lord Chancellor
- Frederick Smith, 2nd Earl of Birkenhead (1907–1975), English peer and biographer
- Frederick Smith, 3rd Earl of Birkenhead (1936–1985), English peer and author

== See also ==
- Frederick Smith (disambiguation)
