= Newbottle =

Newbottle may refer to the following places in England:

- Newbottle, Northamptonshire
- Newbottle, Tyne and Wear
