= Charlton, Northamptonshire =

Village in Northamptonshire, England

Coordinates: 52°01′12″N 1°13′55″W

Charlton
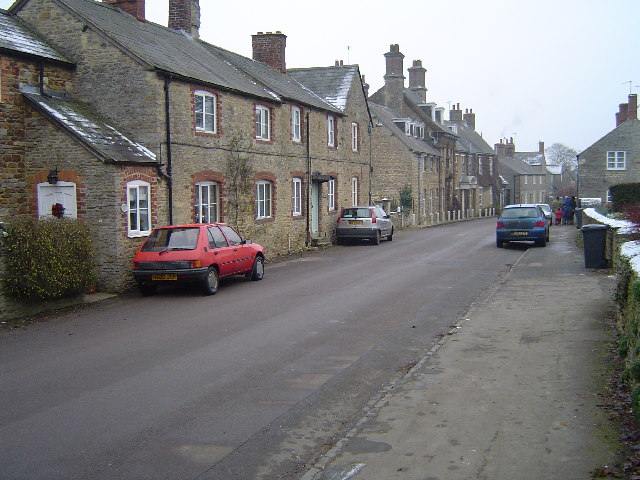
- Main Street

- Location within Northamptonshire
- OS grid reference: SP528360
- Unitary authority: West Northamptonshire
- Ceremonial county: Northamptonshire
- Region: East Midlands
- Country: England
- Sovereign state: United Kingdom
- Post town: BANBURY
- Postcode district: OX17
- Police: Northamptonshire
- Fire: Northamptonshire
- Ambulance: East Midlands

Charlton is a village in the parish of Newbottle, Northamptonshire, England. Situated between Brackley and Kings Sutton, lying close to a small tributary of the River Cherwell. At the 2011 census, the population was included in the civil parish of Newbottle, with a total population of around 540.

Other nearby villages include Croughton, Aynho and Hinton-in-the-Hedges. The remains of an Iron Age fort, Rainsborough Camp, lie just to the south of the village.

The Lay Subsidy rolls of 1301 list 25 taxpayers in Charlton, with a notably more even spread of wealth between them than in Newbottle. The individuals listed include a blacksmith, Pado le fondur ("Pado the smith", an occupational epithet).

The lawyer and politician F.E. Smith, 1st Earl of Birkenhead lived on Main Street in the village, in a house called The Cottage. He took as his second peerage title Viscount Furneaux of Charlton, and his ashes are buried in the village cemetery.

The Iron Age hill fort, Rainsborough Camp, lies around one-half mile (0.80 km) south of the village.
