= King's Sutton =

Village and civil parish in Northamptonshire, England

Coordinates: 52.023°N 1.276°W

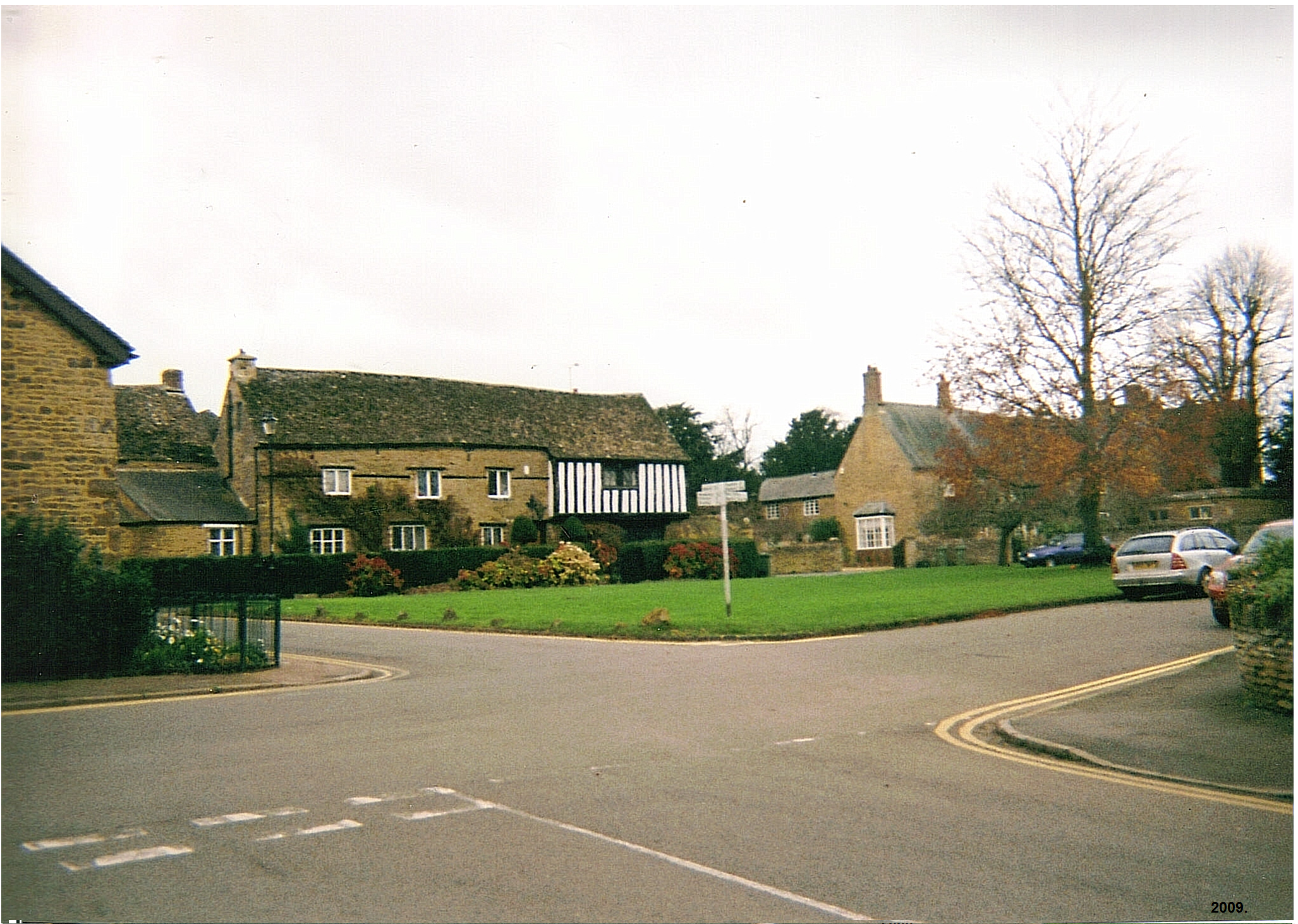
- King's Sutton's central crossroads and village green in 2009

- Location within Northamptonshire
- Population: 2,069 (2001 census); 2,112 (2011 Census)
- OS grid reference: SP4936
  - London: 62 miles (100 km)
- Civil parish: King's Sutton
- Unitary authority: West Northamptonshire
- Ceremonial county: Northamptonshire
- Region: East Midlands
- Country: England
- Sovereign state: United Kingdom
- Post town: BANBURY
- Postcode district: OX17
- Dialling code: 01295
- Police: Northamptonshire
- Fire: Northamptonshire
- Ambulance: East Midlands
- UK Parliament: South Northamptonshire
- Website: King’s Sutton Parish Council website

King's Sutton is a village and civil parish in West Northamptonshire, Northamptonshire, England, in the valley of the River Cherwell. It is sited about 4.1 miles (6.6 km) south-east of Banbury, Oxfordshire. The parish includes the hamlets of Astrop, contiguous with eastern end of King's Sutton, and Upper Astrop, about 1 mile (1.6 km) north-east, in the same area as the shrunken villages of Great and Little Purston.

== History ==
=== Early history ===
The village toponym means the King's south estate.

Blacklands, 0.5 miles (800 m) north of the village, is the site of a Roman town. Coins from the 4th century AD have been recovered from the site.

The infant Saint Rumwold (or Rumwald, Rumbold or Rumbald) is said to have lived and died at King's Sutton in 662. Rumwold is said to have lived for only three days, but professed his faith throughout.

=== The English Civil War ===
The English Civil War helped develop Banbury’s then arms industry. The Royalist garrison was constantly at work early in 1645 digging saltpetre in King's Sutton and making gunpowder out of it in a house specially built near Banbury. Just over ten years earlier, a government saltpetreman had operated at Banbury for a year, having moved there from the then small market town of Coventry, before moving on to Hook Norton a short while afterwards. King's Sutton was a local centre for saltpetre excavation and digging at the time.

== Notable buildings ==
The Court House was built in about 1500, partly of stone and partly timber-framed. It was altered in the 16th and 18th centuries.

The manor house was built in the middle of the 17th century.

=== Parish church ===
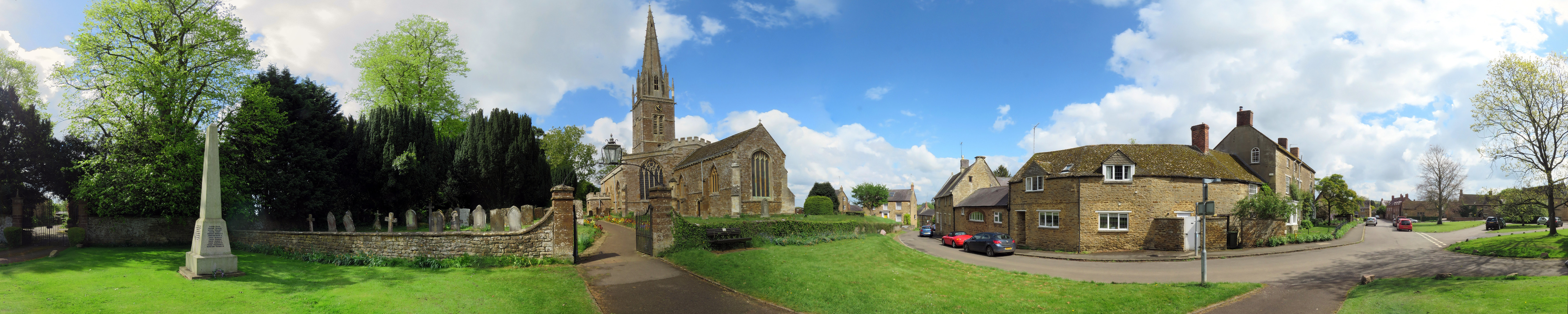
360 degree panorama taken in King's Sutton; visible prominently is the Church of England parish church of Saints Peter and Paul

The oldest parts of the Church of England parish church of Saints Peter and Paul are the Norman font and largely Norman chancel. The north aisle was added in the 13th century and the south aisle early in the 14th century. The bell tower and most of the windows are Decorated Gothic. The spire was added to the tower, probably late in the 14th century, raising the steeple to a height of 198 feet (60 m). Sir Nikolaus Pevsner considered it "one of the finest, if not the finest, spire in this county of spires". The south porch, north aisle, west window and very fine east window of the chancel are Perpendicular Gothic.

Ss. Peter & Paul parish is now part of a single Church of England benefice with the adjacent parish of Newbottle and Charlton.

=== Astrop House ===
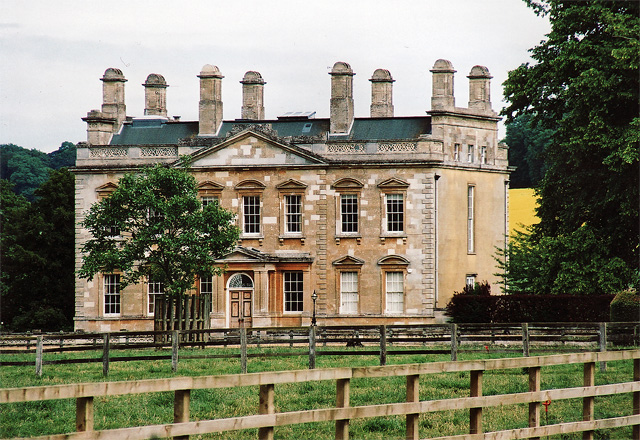
Astrop Park house

Astrop house is a Grade II* listed country manor about 1 mile (1.6 km) north-east of the village. It is constructed of limestone ashlar in two storeys, with a 7-bay frontage

It was built c.1740 for Sir John Willes, Chief Justice of the Court of Common Pleas. Sir John Soane added wings for the Revd. William Shippen Willes, which were extended in the 19th century and demolished in 1961. William Wilkinson added the Keeper's lodge, pheasantry and a cottage in 1868. Lancelot "Capability" Brown laid out the grounds.

Astrop was the site of a famous Spa discovered in the 17th century. All that now remains is a small well, known as St. Rumbald's Well, south of the house in a valley.

== Governance ==
The village has a parish council with 15 members.

== Transport ==
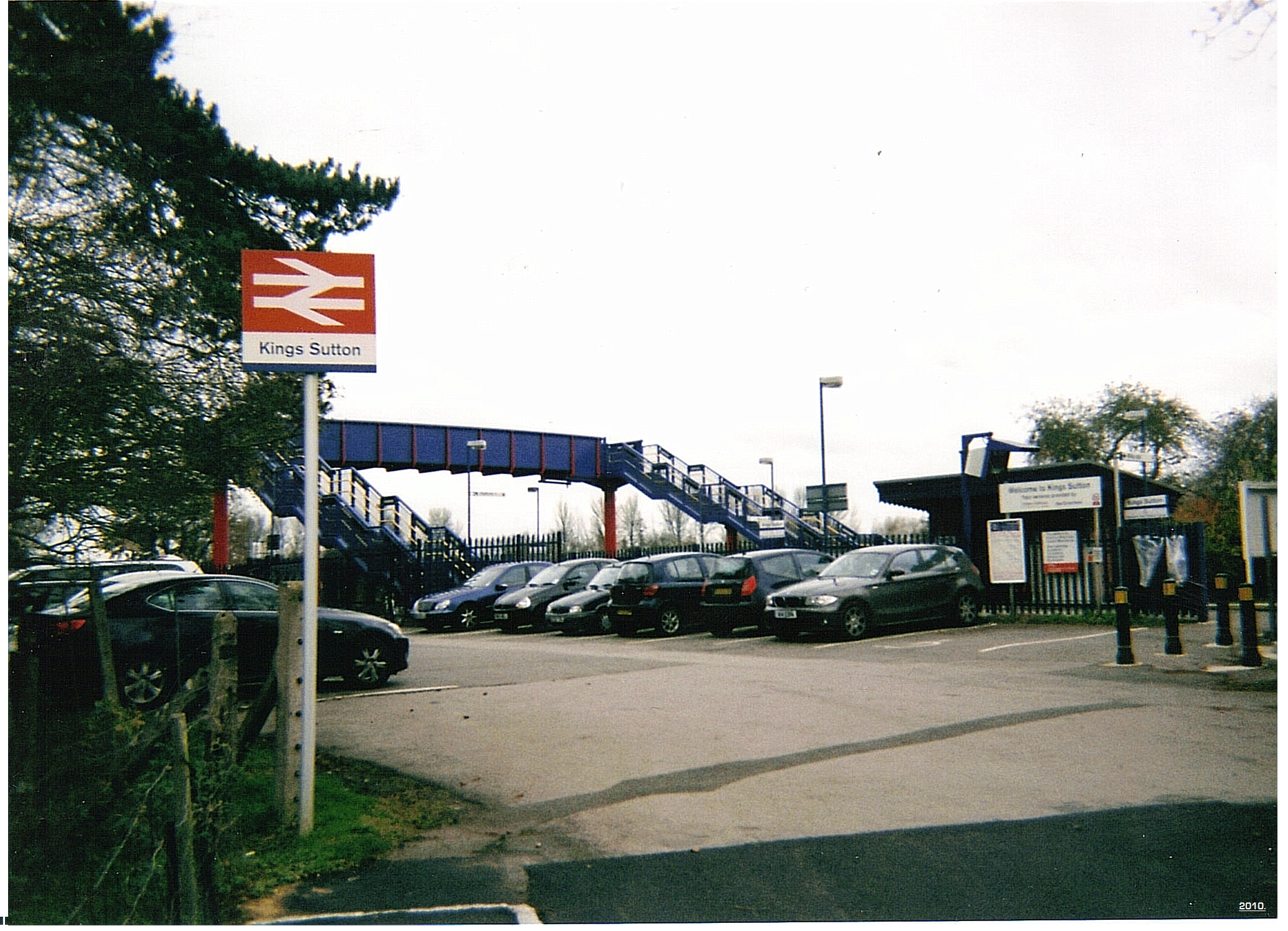
King's Sutton station

King's Sutton railway station is served by two train operating companies:

- Chiltern Railways operates regular services between London Marylebone and Birmingham Snow Hill, via Warwick
- Great Western Railway runs services to Oxford and Didcot Parkway.

== Amenities ==
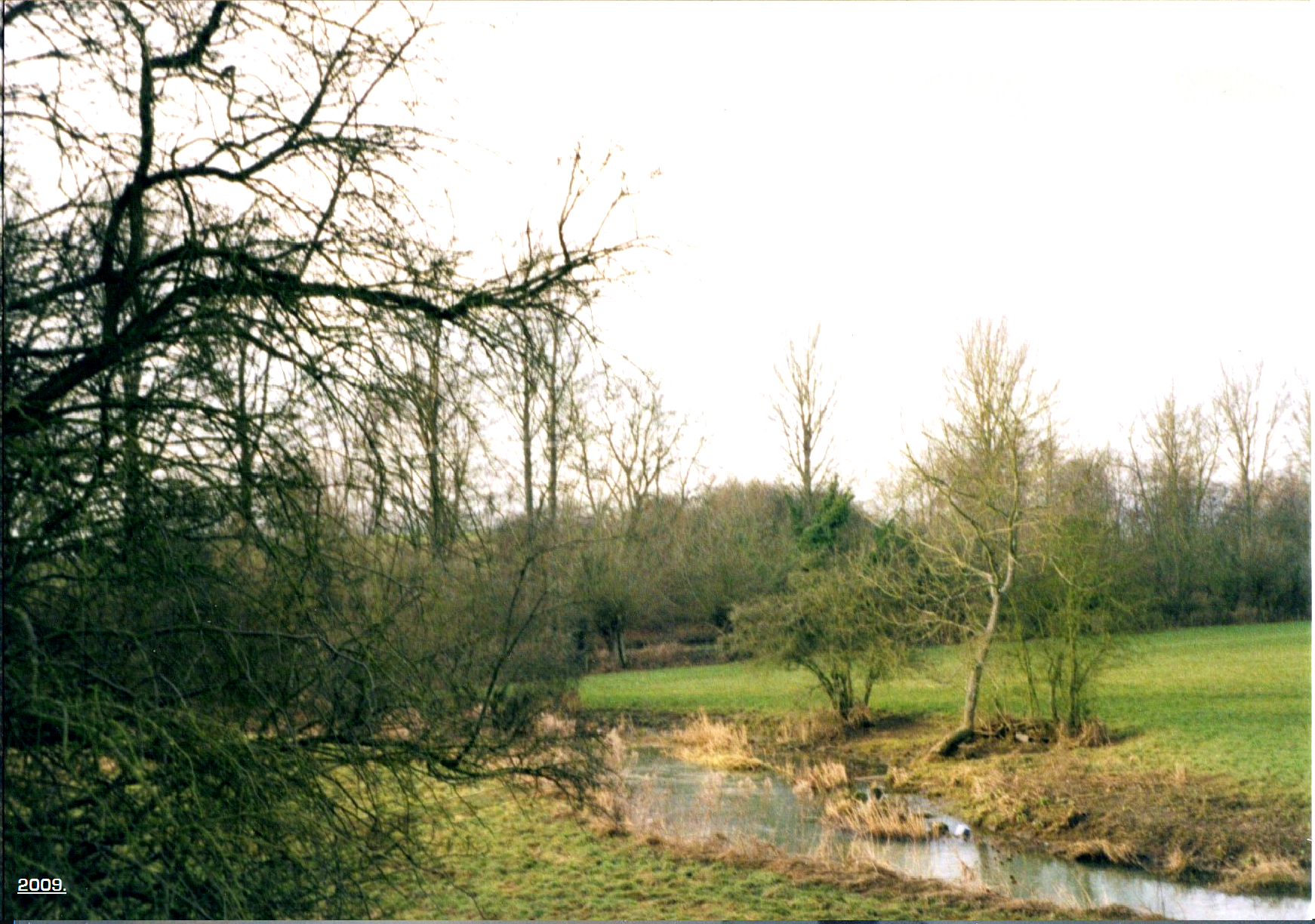
A picture of farmland outside the village

Kings Sutton Primary School is in Richmond Street. It celebrated its centenary in 2008. Its last Ofsted report was in 2010 and gave the school grade 2, stating: "This is a good school. The new headteacher provides focused leadership so that all the staff are supporting the good quality of education for the pupils." The school used to be in Astrop Road and those premises are now a private house. Kings Sutton also has a pre-school.

King's Sutton has two public houses: the Butchers Arms (Hook Norton Brewery) and the White Horse.

There is also a lawn tennis club.

== Heritage Trust ==
King's Sutton Heritage Trust Fund was formed in December 2005, with a mission statement that reads: "To promote, protect and enhance the history, facilities, structures and amenities of the village of King's Sutton and the surrounding area for the benefit of its inhabitants."

== Notable residents ==
- Olga Kevelos, motorcycle racer, was landlady of The Three Tuns in King's Sutton for a number of years.
- Arthur Halestrap, one of the last surviving British soldiers of the First World War, lived and died in the village.

== Gallery ==
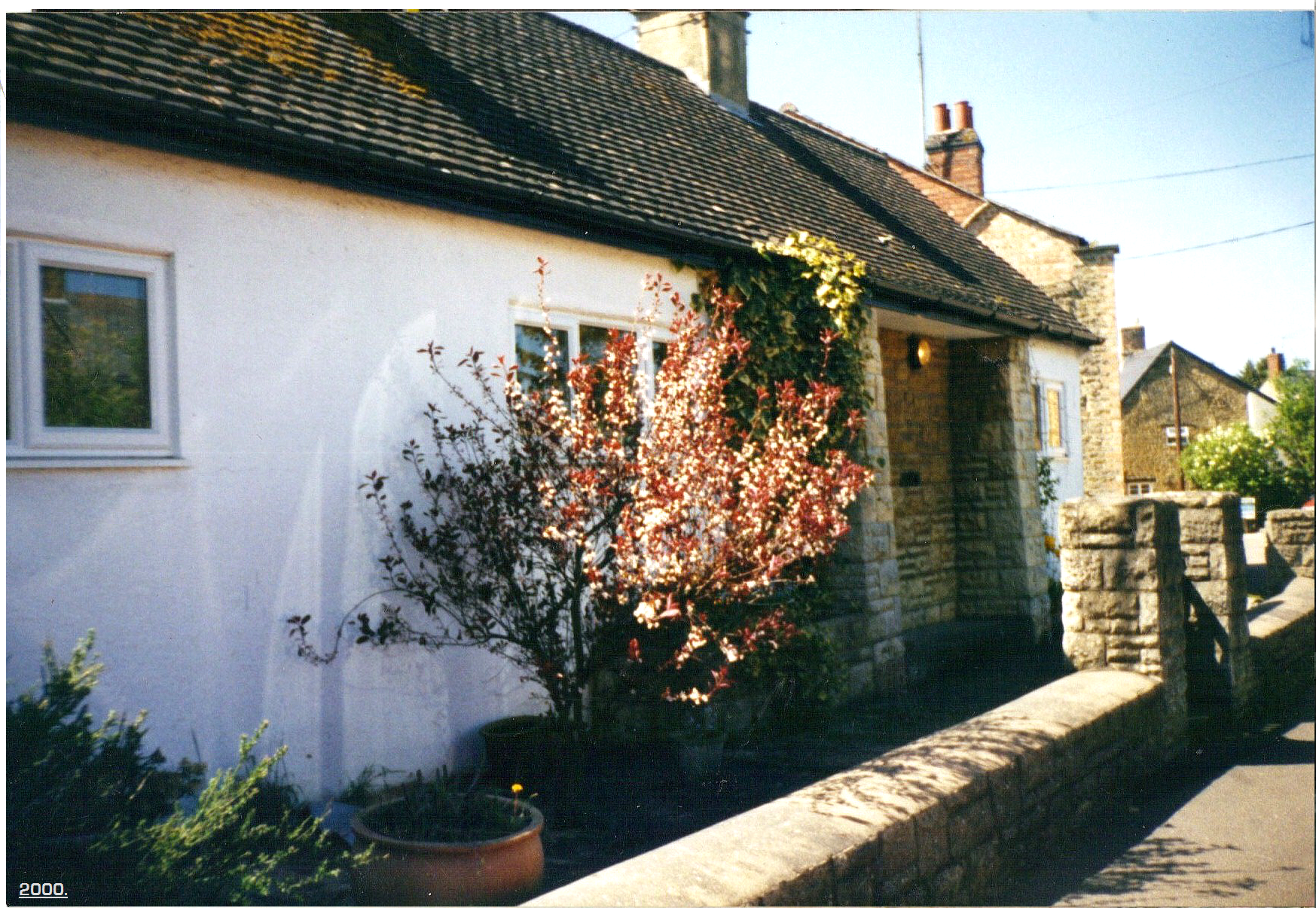
King's Sutton in 2000.

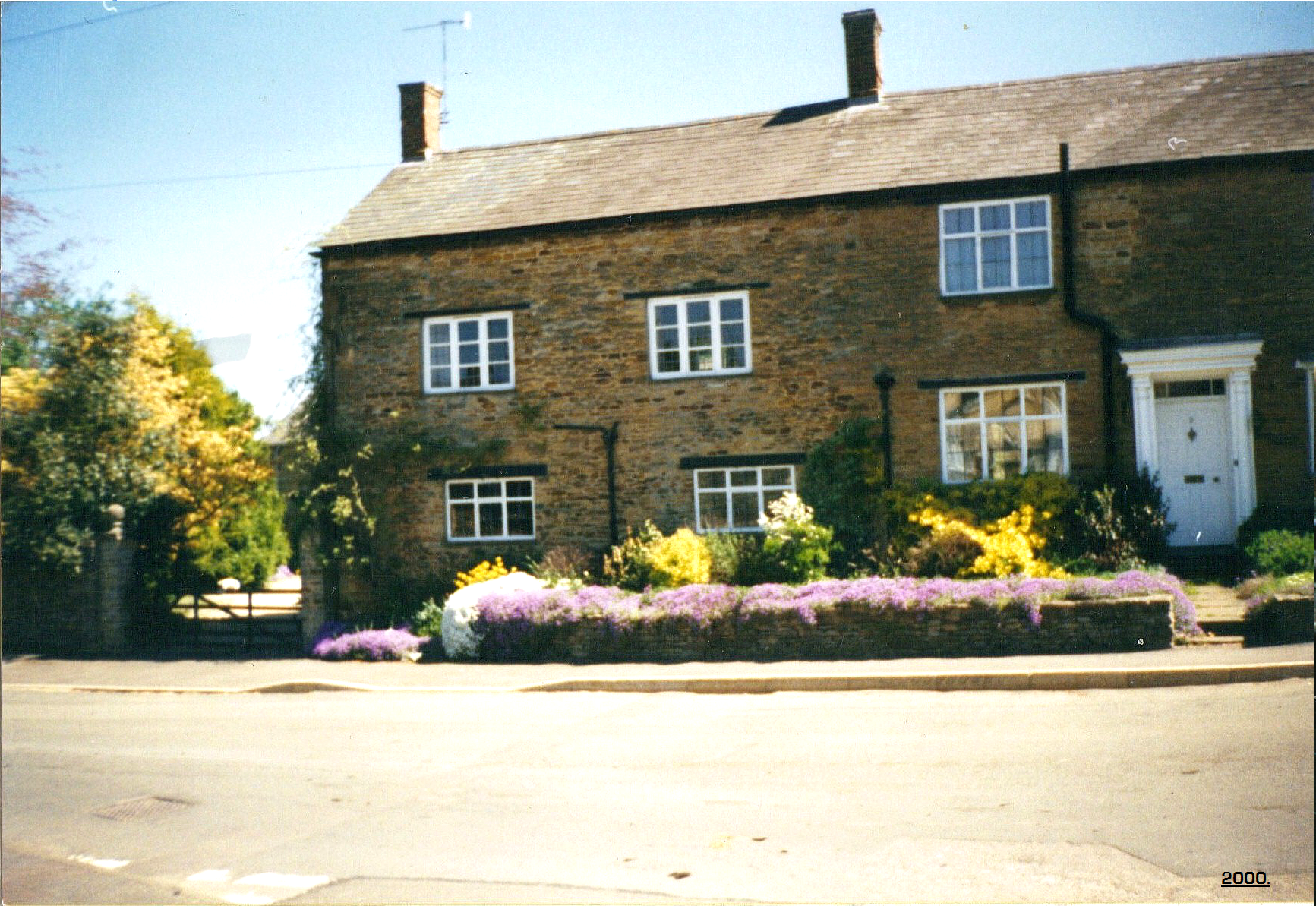
King's Sutton in 2000.

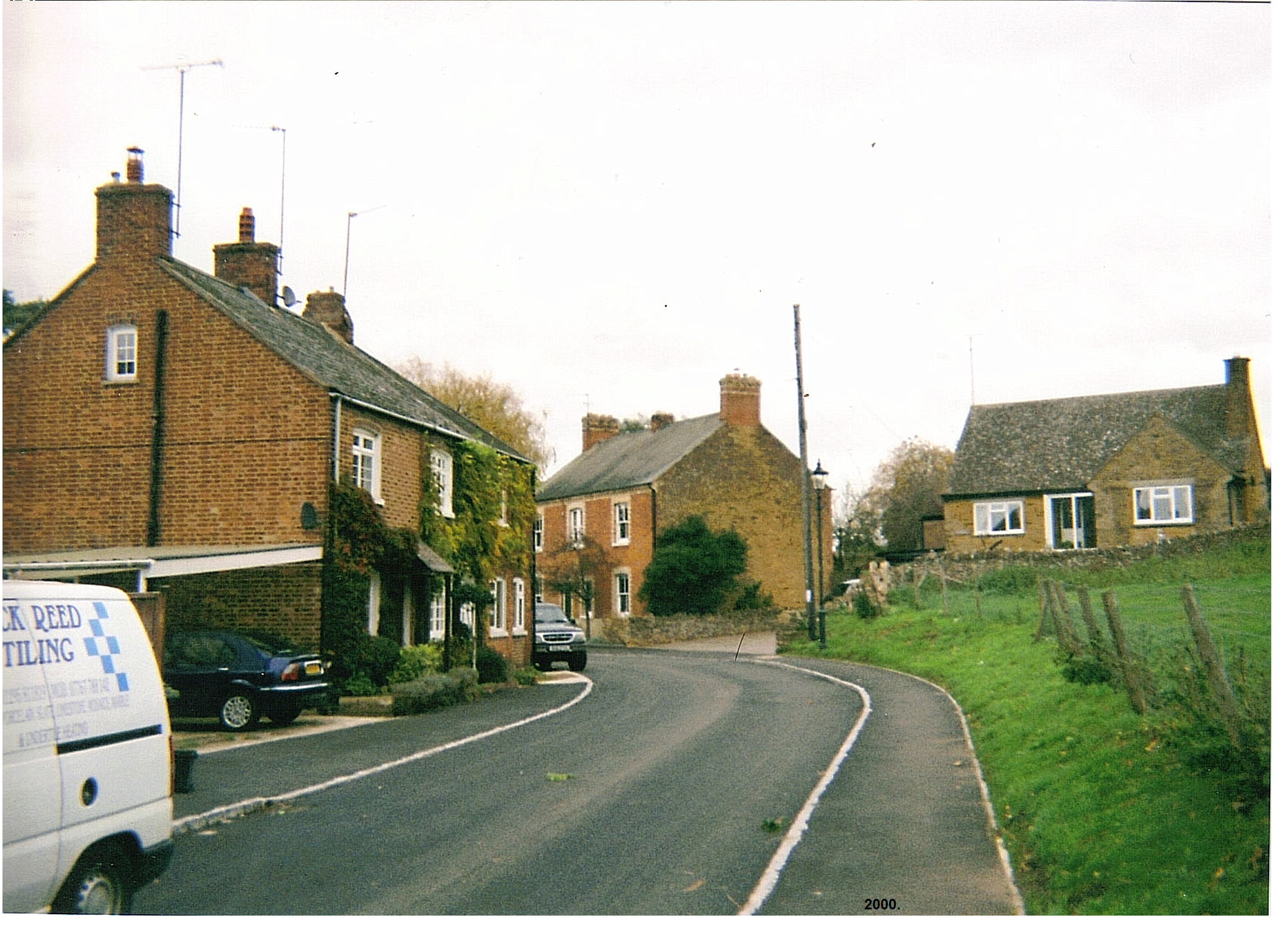
King's Sutton in 2000.

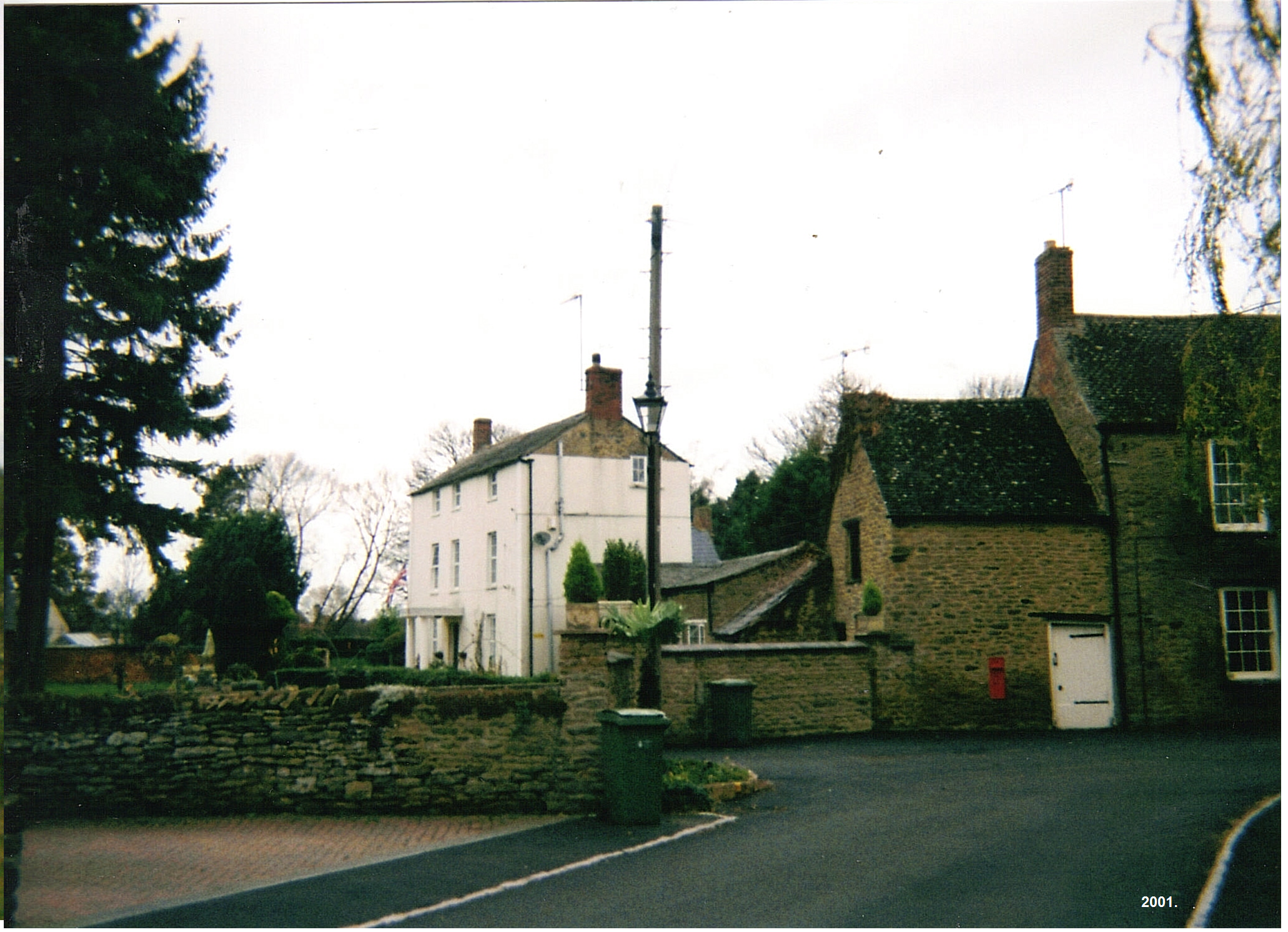
King's Sutton in 2001.

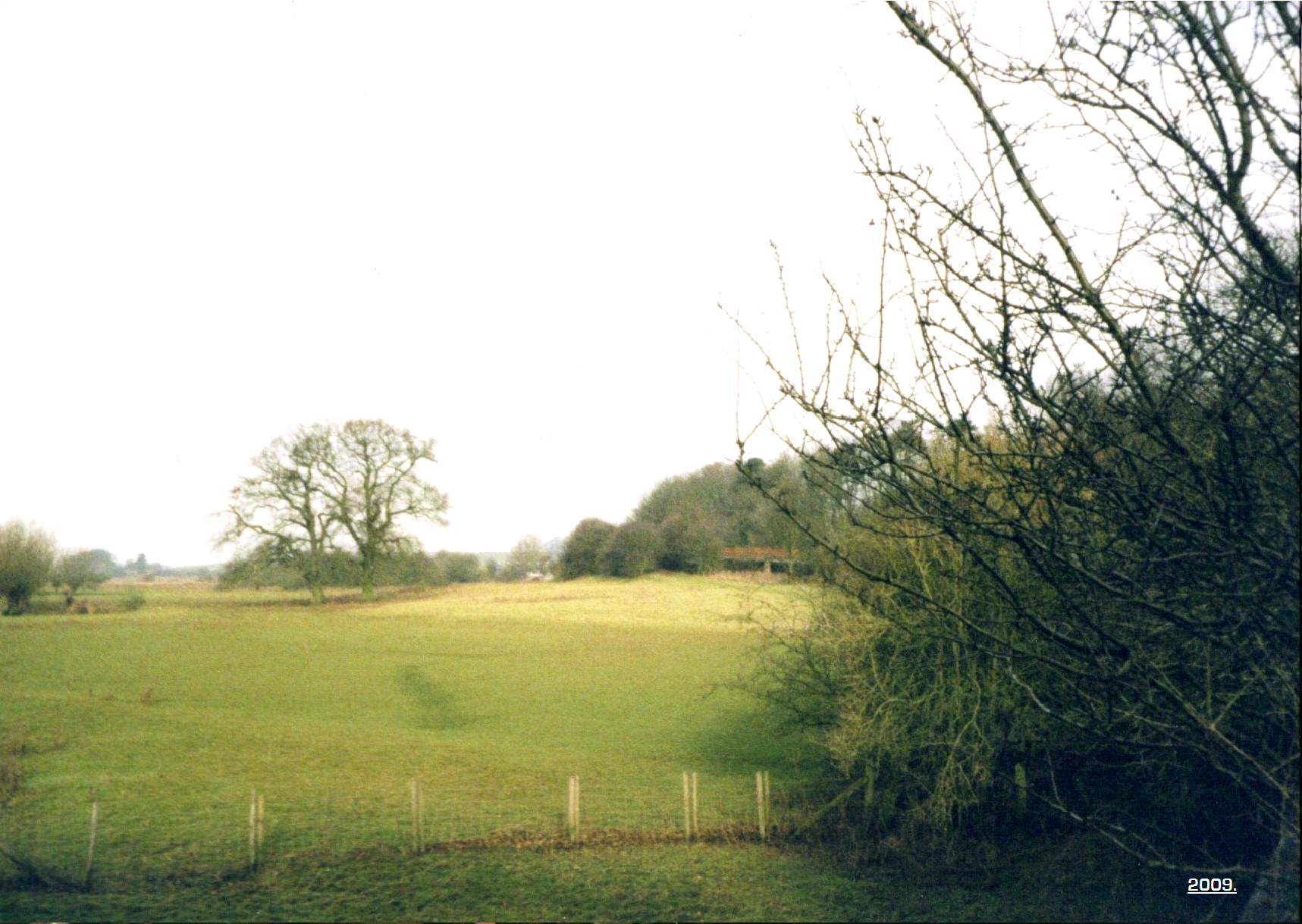
King's Sutton in 2009.

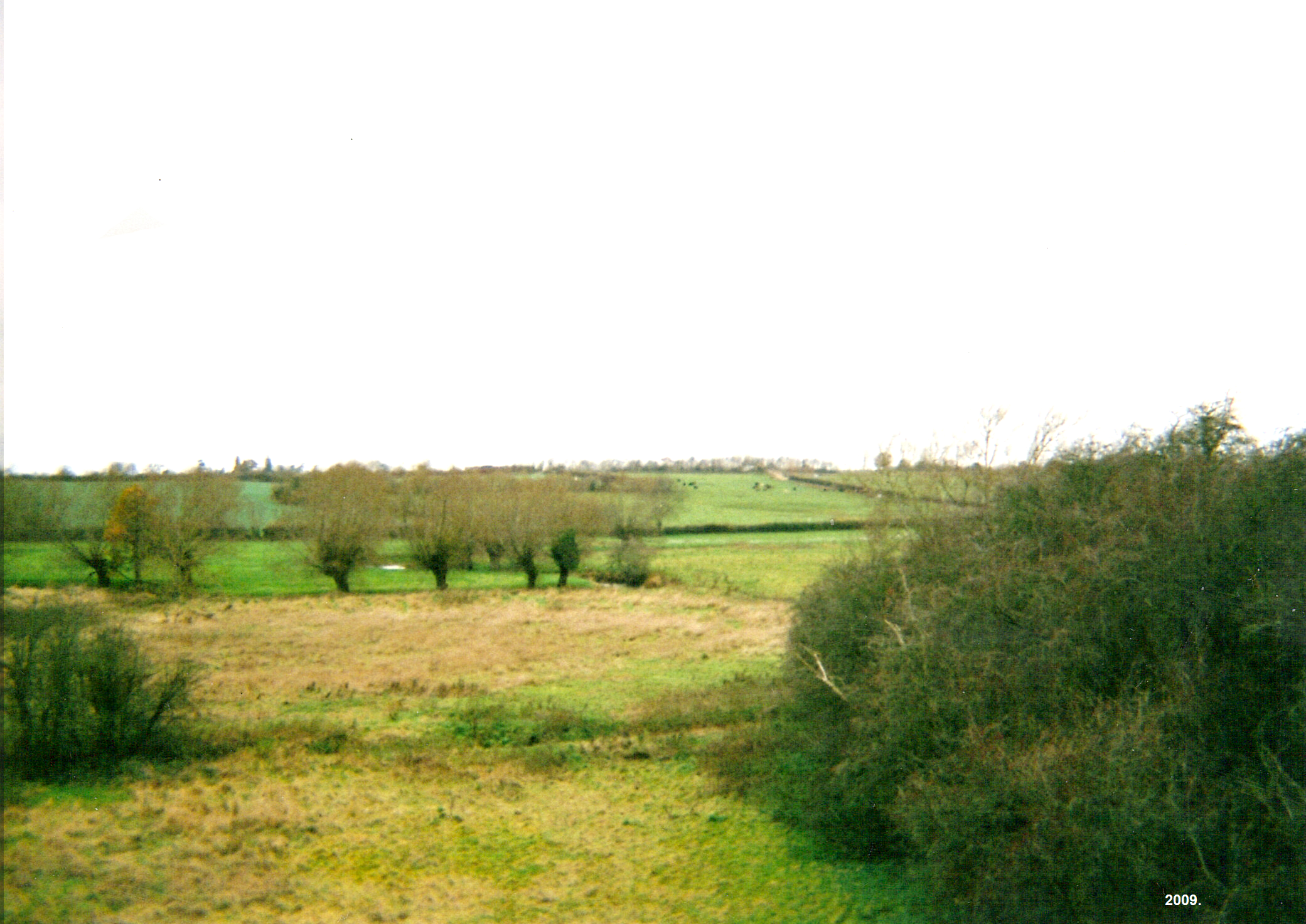
King's Sutton in 2009.

== See also ==
- Banburyshire
- History of Banbury
