= Earl of Birkenhead =

Title in the Peerage of the United Kingdom

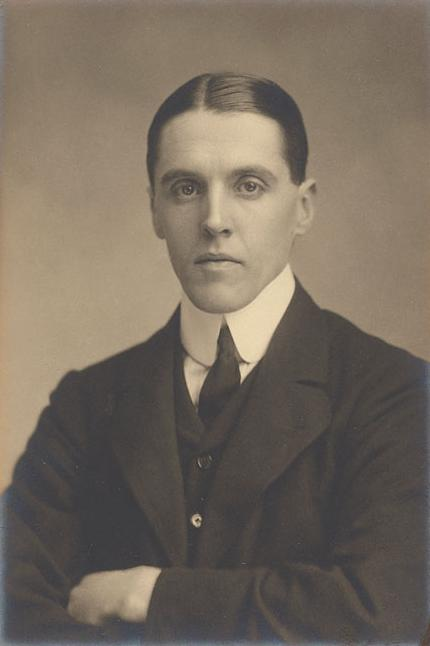
F. E. Smith, 1st Earl of Birkenhead.

Earl of Birkenhead was a title in the Peerage of the United Kingdom. It was created in 1922 for the noted lawyer and Conservative politician F. E. Smith, 1st Viscount Birkenhead. He was Solicitor-General in 1915, Attorney-General from 1915 to 1919, and Lord High Chancellor of Great Britain from 1919 to 1922. Smith had already been created a Baronet in the Baronetage of the United Kingdom in 1918, Baron Birkenhead, of Birkenhead in the County of Chester, in 1919, Viscount Birkenhead, of Birkenhead in the County of Chester, in 1921, and was made Viscount Furneaux, of Charlton in the County of Northampton, at the same time as he was given the earldom. The three peerages, along with the earldom, were in the Peerage of the United Kingdom. Viscount Furneaux was used as the courtesy title by the heir apparent to the earldom; the title was derived from the maiden name of Lord Birkenhead's wife.

He was succeeded by his only son, the second Earl. He was also a Conservative politician and held minor office under Neville Chamberlain and Winston Churchill. However, Lord Birkenhead is best remembered as a biographer. He was succeeded by his only son, the third Earl. Like his father, he was a biographer. He never married and the titles became extinct on his early death in 1985. The second Earl's daughter, Lady Juliet Townsend, was Lord Lieutenant of Northamptonshire.

Birkenhead was a member of the committee for the 1924 Olympic Games, and more than 50 years after his death he was portrayed by actor Nigel Davenport in the 1981 film Chariots of Fire.

== Earls of Birkenhead (1922–1985) ==
- Frederick Edwin Smith, 1st Earl of Birkenhead (1872–1930)
- Frederick Winston Furneaux Smith, 2nd Earl of Birkenhead (1907–1975)
- Frederick William Robin Smith, 3rd Earl of Birkenhead (1936–1985)

== Arms ==
Coat of arms of Earl of Birkenhead
Crest A cubit arm couped fessways vested Gules cuffed Argent the hand Proper grasping a sword erect also Argent pommel and hilt Or. Escutcheon Ermine on a pale Gules between four cross crosslets of the second a like cross Or. Supporters Dexter a griffin Or wings per fess Or and Sable, sinister a lion Azure charged on the shoulder with a crozier Or. Motto Latin: Faber Meæ Fortunæ ("The maker of my own fortune") (alternatively seen as "I am the Smith of my own Fortune")
