= Newbottle, Northamptonshire =

Civil parish in Northamptonshire, England

Coordinates: 52.028°N 1.239°W

Newbottle
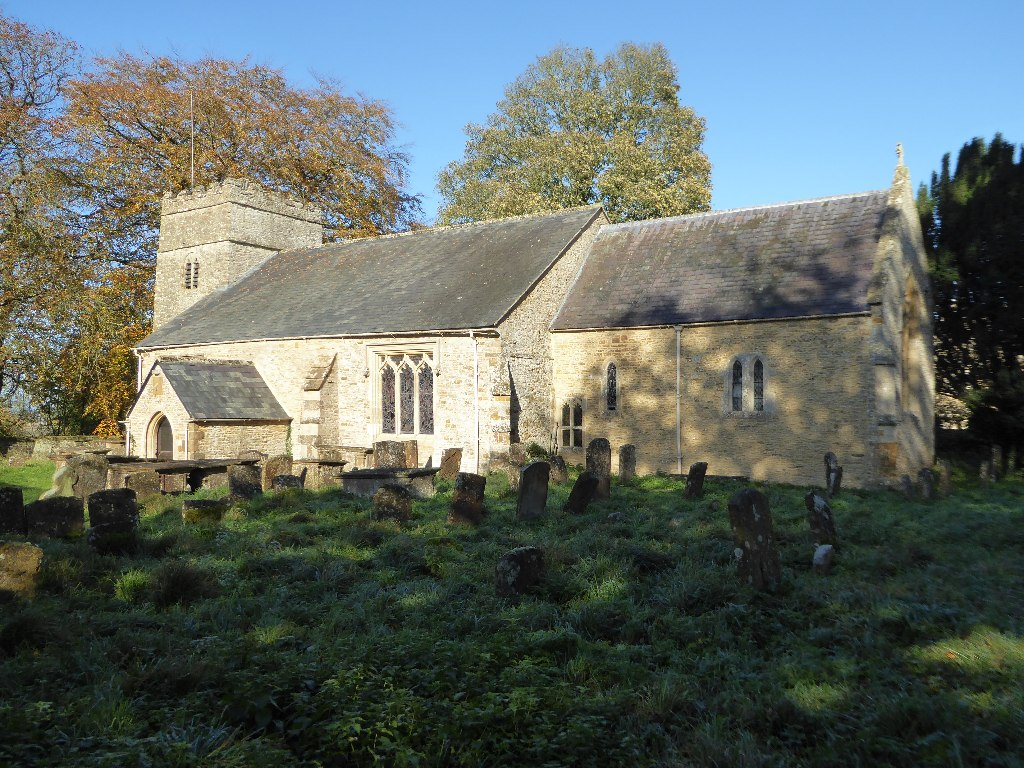
- Newbottle church

- Location within Northamptonshire
- Population: 438 (2001 census); 528 (2011 census)
- OS grid reference: SP523369
- Civil parish: Newbottle
- Unitary authority: West Northamptonshire
- Ceremonial county: Northamptonshire
- Region: East Midlands
- Country: England
- Sovereign state: United Kingdom
- Post town: Banbury
- Postcode district: OX17
- Dialling code: 01295
- Police: Northamptonshire
- Fire: Northamptonshire
- Ambulance: East Midlands
- UK Parliament: Daventry
- Website: Welcome to the Charlton-cum-Newbottle Website!

Newbottle is a civil parish and largely deserted village in West Northamptonshire, about 4 miles (6.4 km) west of the market town of Brackley. It is close to the Oxfordshire county boundary and about 4.5 miles (7.2 km) south-east of the town of Banbury.

The village's name means 'new building'.

A stream that is a tributary of the River Cherwell forms the parish boundary to the north-west. The remainder of the parish boundary mostly follows field boundaries.

The parish includes the larger village of Charlton, about 0.5 miles (800 m) south-east of Newbottle. The 2001 census recorded a parish population of 438, mostly in Charlton, increasing to a joint population of 528 at the 2011 census.

== Archaeology ==
Rainsborough Camp is an early Iron Age hill fort in the southernmost part of the parish. Excavations in 1961–65 found that it had been inhabited and developed in phases between the 4th century BC and about 4 AD.

== History ==
In 1086 Newbottle had a population of 32 households, including 15 slaves, although these figures probably included nearby Charlton and Purston. The Lay Subsidy rolls of 1301 list 23 taxpayers in Newbottle, with the richest individuals markedly more affluent than their counterparts in Charlton.

Part of the land was enclosed shortly before 1500, and six houses were taken down. By 1524 the settlement held only three taxpayers, and sheep farming was widespread in the area by 1550, suggesting significant depopulation. The population later recovered, with around 40 families resident early in the 18th century and thirty-eight men aged between 18 and 45 in 1777, but the village was eventually abandoned, with only the church, manor house, and some farm buildings now remaining.

== Manor ==
Newbottle manor house is 16th century, built probably in the reign of Henry VIII possibly by Peter Dormer, a member of the famous Buckinghamshire family, who held "Nubottel" at about that time when his daughter Elizabeth married the owner of Salford Hall, Salford Abbots. The west wing was added in the 17th century, and the library has panelling dating from about 1730. The house also has an octagonal dovecote.

== Parish church ==
The Church of England parish church of Saint James has a tower built in about 1290-1210 and a Norman font. The present chancel is 13th century. Between the nave and north aisle is a four-bay Decorated Gothic arcade. The south aisle is a Perpendicular Gothic arcade addition. The Gothic Revival east window in the chancel was inserted in 1865 and its stained glass is by C.E. Kempe.

In the Middle Ages St. James' belonged to the Augustinian Dunstable Priory. The Priory's annals for 1291, record it as receiving tithes from Newbottle. It still possessed St. James' in 1535 when the Crown's bailiff valued the Priory's property and estates in preparation for the Dissolution of the Monasteries.

St. James' now forms a single benefice with SS Peter and Paul, King's Sutton.
