= Frederick Smyth =

Frederick Smyth may refer to:

- Frederick Smyth (New Hampshire politician) (1819–1899), Governor of New Hampshire
- Frederick Smyth (New York politician) (1832–1900), justice of the New York Supreme Court

== See also ==
- Frederick Smith (disambiguation)
