= The World in 2030 =

1930 speculative book by F. E. Smith

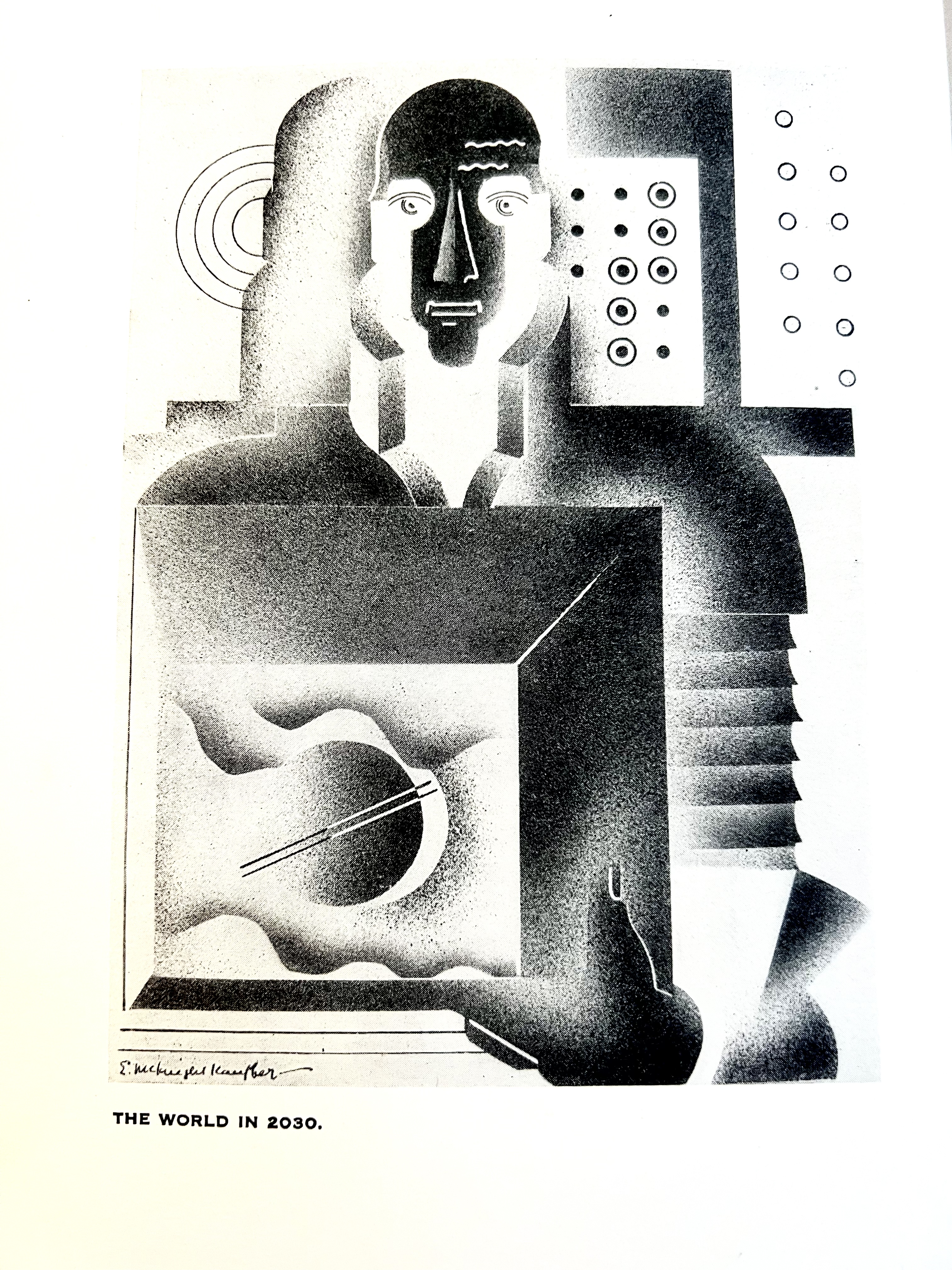
- Frontispiece
- Author: F. E. Smith, 1st Earl of Birkenhead; Unnamed ghostwriter
- Illustrator: Edward McKnight Kauffer
- Language: English
- Genre: Futurology
- Publication date: 1930
- Text: The World in 2030 at the Internet Archive

The World in 2030 is a book published in 1930, shortly before the death of its author, F. E. Smith, 1st Earl of Birkenhead. He described it as “a series of speculative predictions dealing with the possible development of the world during the next hundred years.” It was published in London by Hodder & Stoughton, and illustrated with airbrush designs by Edward McKnight Kauffer.

== Chapters ==
=== The World in 2030 ===
The book imagined a world in which agriculture had all but vanished, “at least in civilized lands.” The inefficient process of converting and storing solar power first in plants and then in the meat of herbivores would be a thing of the past, and by 2030 giant factories would synthesize food directly from sunlight. The countryside would be electrified, and the landscape would be enhanced by smokeless factories resembling an “interminable park." By 2030, Birkenhead was confident that “man will be armed with sufficient power to undertake operations on a cosmic scale; it will be open to him to radically alter the geography or climate of the world."

=== War in 2030 ===
Birkenhead’s main view of future warfare was that it would probably be more humane than that of the twentieth century.

The book speculated that infantry war would be largely a thing of the past, with tanks forming the core of any invasion force. Birkenhead foresaw that they could be unmanned and controlled remotely - "The commanders of tank forces will be carried in the air above their commands, and thus will be able to watch the course of operations and control their progress by wireless telephony."

In this chapter, Birkenhead also gave a prescient warning of the future risks of nuclear weapons, “which will involve the world, and reduce it to a flaring vortex of incandescent gas.”

=== Everyday Life in 2030 ===
In spite of the myriad "labour saving devices" which will doubtless have multiplied by that date, and will have converted the English domestic interior into the semblance of a machine shop, many married couples will find housekeeping beyond their powers. Perhaps they may find refuge in large communal establishments, equipped with private bed rooms and studies, but sharing refectories, libraries, music-rooms, lounges, nurseries and kitchens. The management of these synthesised homes may be undertaken by the large number of women who adorn every generation and who, to the eternal benefit of their friends and relations, find their greatest happiness in discharging the duties of housekeeper or nurse. I do not believe that any amount of organised education can turn such women from domestic occupations and cares.

=== The Air in 2030 ===
The book anticipated that by 2030 cars would be generally obsolete for most purposes, except for the shortest of journeys. Instead, ownership of aircraft would be common - Birkenhead described engines weighing only one ounce (28 g) per unit of horsepower, offering light air vehicles that could take off vertically and fly at 400 miles per hour (640 km/h). This would mean transatlantic flights lasting as little as three hours.

=== The World Polity in 2030 ===
Birkenhead reasoned that the concept of the national state was a relatively recent one, and that for much of its history Europe had been characterised by a range of transnational loyalties. He held that the British Empire was incompatible with nationalism, and that it would survive in 2030 as “a partnership of free and equal peoples." “British rule in India will endure,“ he affirmed. “By 2030, whatever means of self-government India has achieved, she will still remain a loyal and integral part of the British Empire.”

=== Woman in 2030 ===
Birkenhead foresaw that science would give the world wireless telephony and many practical uses of electricity, but that the relations between races and sexes would also be transformed. He assumed that if the family was to survive into the 21st century, limitations would have to be placed on women’s intellectual development. He made no comment about men’s parenting.

== Controversy ==
The book, which generated a great deal of publicity on publication, was ghost-written, and some of its ideas drew on those contained in Daedalus; or, Science and the Future by J. B. S. Haldane. When Haldane noted this in a review, the result was a public argument between them in the pages of the Daily Express and the Weekend Review.

== Critical assessment ==
Russell Kirk argued that “it is an odd book to be written by a Tory; for the world of 2030 AD, as Birkenhead imagined it, would have eliminated disease, war, poverty - and, substantially, human nature. It would be a world ruled by the psychologist and the statistician, practising ectogenesis, living on synthetic nutrient, emancipated from every vestige of mystery and the old web of individuality.”

However John Quirk argued that the book was a fusion of imperialism and futurism, intended as a counter to the rise of dictatorships in Europe, and the despondency caused by the Great Depression. He described it as “nothing more than the wishful dream of an 1830 Tory mentality given technocratic expression.” I. F. Clarke described the book as “a last serenade from a bugler of the old brigade to the future as it used to be.”
