= I Warn the Government =

1906 speech by British politician F. E. Smith

"I Warn the Government" is a speech by F. E. Smith, made on 12 March 1906. It was his maiden speech in the British House of Commons. According to Brian MacArthur, it was "the most famous [speech] ever made" in the Commons in modern times. The historian Paul Johnson has described the speech as "without question the most famous maiden speech in history." Smith used his opportunity as a member of the embattled Tory opposition of 1906 to decry and assail the government for their heavy-handedness and arrogance after winning a landslide victory in the general election. After this speech, Tim Healy, the Irish Nationalist, a master of parliamentary invective, sent Smith a note, "I am old, and you are young, but you have beaten me at my own game." The speech solidified Smith's reputation as an orator and rising political star, and established him as a major figure within the Conservative Party. His place in party politics thus established, F.E. Smith would go on to hold numerous posts and cabinet positions under the later Lloyd George Coalition Government, as Lord Chancellor from 1918 to 1922, and under Stanley Baldwin as Secretary of State for India in 1924–1928.

A copy of the speech was included in the following day's Times, which is archived online.

In part, the speech reads:

"It is far easier, if one is a master of scholarly irony, and of a charming literary style, to describe protection as a 'stinking rotten carcass' than to discuss scientifically whether certain limited proposals are likely to prove protective in their incidence. It is far easier, if one has a strong stomach, to suggest to simple rustics, as the President of the Board of Trade did, that, if the Tories came into power, they would introduce slavery on the hills of Wales. [ David Lloyd George: 'I did not say that']

The Right Hon. Gentleman would, no doubt, be extremely anxious to forget it, if he could; but, anticipating a temporary lapse of memory, I have in my hand the Manchester Guardian of January 16, 1906, which contains a report of his speech. The Right Hon. Gentleman said: 'What would they say to introducing Chinamen at 1S [one shilling] a day into the Welsh quarries? Slavery on the hills of Wales: Heaven forgive me for the suggestion.' I have no means of judging how heaven will deal with persons who think it decent to make such suggestions. The distinction drawn by the Right Hon. Gentleman is more worthy of the county court than of the Treasury Bench...

The Free Church Council gave thanks publicly for the fact that Providence had inspired the electors with discrimination to vote on the right side. Mr. Speaker, I do not, more than another man, mind being cheated at cards; but I find it a little nauseating if my opponent then publicly ascribes his success to the partnership of the Most High. What the future of this Parliament has in store for Right Hon. Gentlemen opposite I do not know, but I hear that the government will deny to the Colonial Conference of 1907 free discussion on the subject which the House is now debating, so as to prevent the statement of unpalatable truths. I know that I am the insignificant representative of an insignificant numerical minority in this House, but I venture to warn the government that the people of this country will neither forget nor forgive a party which, in the heyday of its triumph, denies to the infant Parliament of the Empire one jot or tittle of that ancient liberty of speech which our predecessors in this House vindicated for themselves at the point of the sword."
