= Rainsborough Camp =

Hillfort in Northamptonshire, England

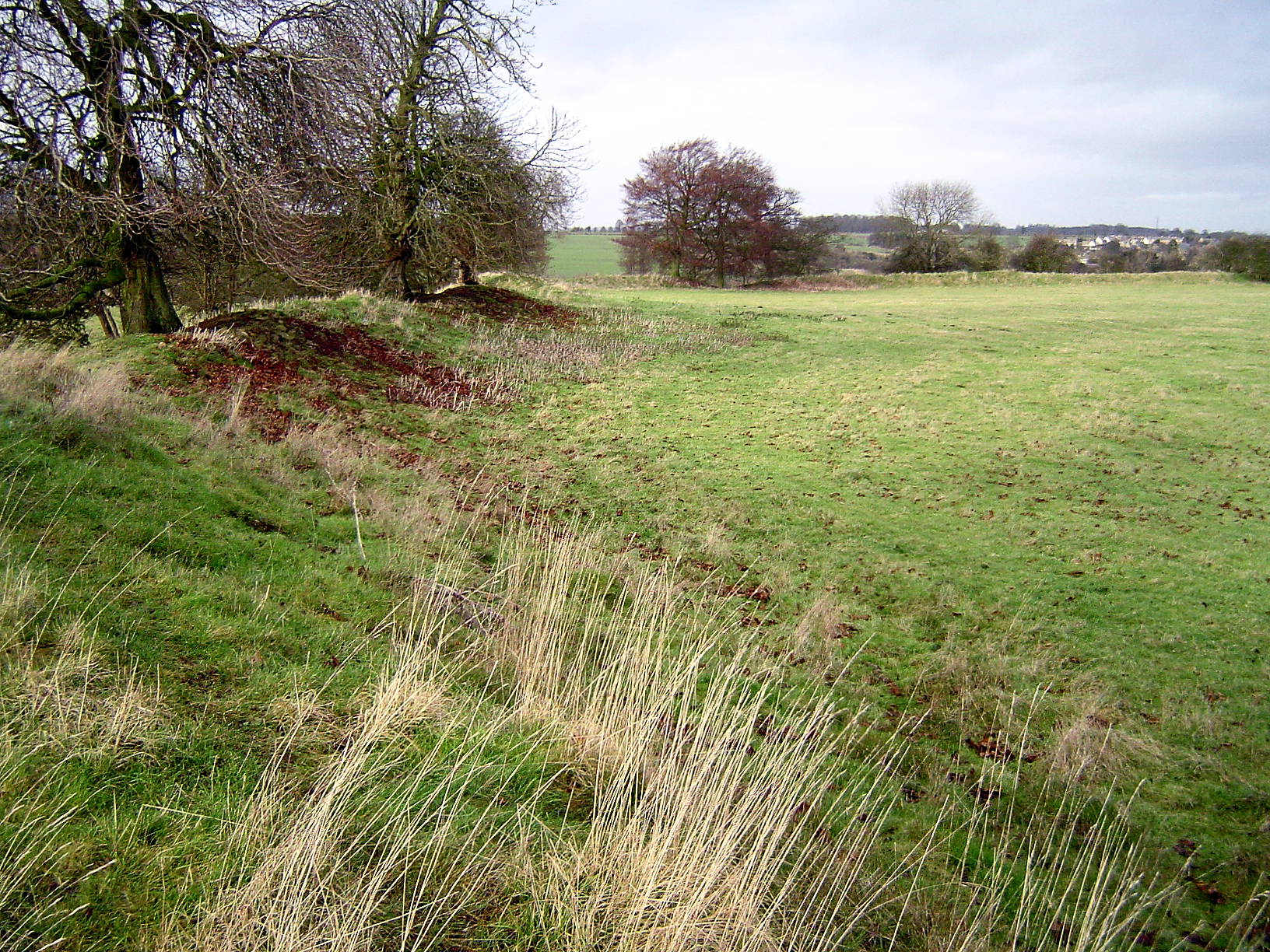

- Location within Northamptonshire
- 52.0091°N 1.2350°W
- Type: Hillfort
- Periods: Iron Age; Roman
- Location: Near Aynho, Northamptonshire
- OS grid reference: SP 526 348

Site notes
- Elevation: 145 m (476 ft)
- Area: 2.6 hectares (6.4 acres)

Rainsborough Camp is an Iron Age hillfort in West Northamptonshire, England, between the villages of Croughton, Aynho, and Charlton.

== Location and description ==
There are extensive views to the north-west towards the Cherwell valley; the land is flat to the south-east. The altitude is 145 metres (476 ft).

It is a bivallate fort, roughly oval, and longest from north to south; the area is about 2.6 hectares (6.4 acres). The interior, having been under cultivation in the past, is featureless. The inner rampart is about 3 metres (10 ft) above the enclosed area; the rampart is about 4 metres (13 ft) above its external ditch. The outer rampart is up to 1 metre (3 ft 3 in) high on the south side, 0.5 metres (1 ft 8 in) on the west and north side, no longer visible on the east side. There are slight traces of a ditch outside the outer rampart on the west side. The original entrance is the slightly inturned gap in the western side; other entrances are later.

The site was landscaped in the late 18th century. The inner bank was made higher and the inner ditch deeper; a dry-stone wall was added to the outer slope of the inner bank: this is visible along much of the rampart.

== Excavation ==
The site was excavated extensively between 1961 and 1965. Several phases of occupation were found. There was pre-fort occupation in the 6th/5th centuries B.C. A bivallate fort was built in the 5th century B.C.: the inner rampart was tiered in three steps at the rear, and the west entrance had stone guardrooms behind the inturned entrances. Occupation continued, with repairs to the defences, until the early 4th century B.C. when the fort was attacked and burnt, and perhaps abandoned.

In the late 2nd century B.C. the fort was refortified: the ramparts had a glacis form, and the entrance was rebuilt. The work was left incomplete and the fort was abandoned. There is evidence of activity in the Roman period, in the late 1st century A.D. and the 3rd to 4th centuries A.D.
