= Frederick W. Smith (physician) =

American doctor

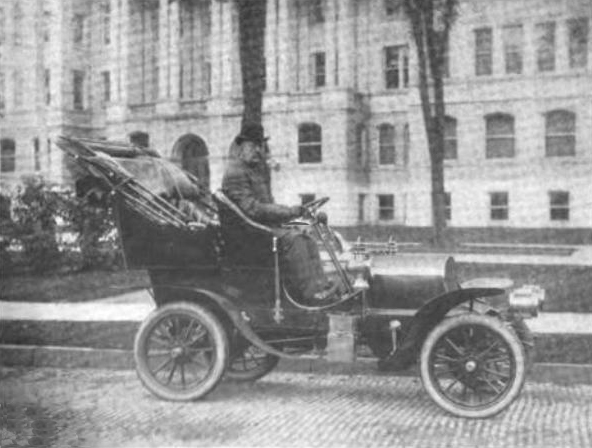
- Frederick W. Smith in 1906.
- Born: August 24, 1858; Triangle, Broome County, New York, U.S.
- Died: July 31, 1917 (aged 58); Syracuse, New York
- Education: New York University and Syracuse University
- Occupations: Physician, Surgeon
- Known for: Coroner for Onondaga County, New York; Health Commissioner for the city of Syracuse. New York State Board of Health

Frederick Walter Smith (August 24, 1858 – July 31, 1917) was an American physician and surgeon in Syracuse, New York. By 1897, he was serving as Health Commissioner for the city of Syracuse and during June 1902, he was appointed as health officer of the city. He also served as coroner of Onondaga County, New York. Smith died on July 31, 1917, at the age of 58.
