= Fred Smith (footballer, born 1914) =

English footballer

Personal information
- Full name: Frederick Arthur Smith
- Date of birth: 16 April 1914
- Place of birth: Liverpool, England
- Date of death: 2 September 1982 (aged 68)
- Position: Centre forward

Youth career
- Cadby Hall

Senior career*
Years	Team	Apps	(Gls)
1936–1938	Bury	6	(0)
1938–1940	Bradford (Park Avenue)	29	(21)
- * Club domestic league appearances and goals

Frederick Arthur Smith (16 April 1914 – 2September 1982) was an English footballer who played at centre forward for Bury and Bradford (Park Avenue) A.F.C. ("Bradford PA") in the 1930s.

Frederick ("Fred") Arthur Smith was born at West Derby, Liverpool on 16 April 1914. His father, William Smith, was a police sergeant. Fred was signed by Bury from junior club Cadby Hall in November 1936. He moved to Bradford PA in the summer of 1938, and took over as their centre-forward when George Henson lost his place. Fred scored 21 goals in 1938-39 in 29 Football League appearances.

After the Second World War broke out Fred got a job at a Bradford wool mill as a stuff warehouseman. In March 1940 he joined the Coldstream Guards and left the Bradford club. Since the outbreak of war he had been in the local police war reserve. During the war he made 8 appearances for Bradford PA (6 in 1939-40 and another two in 1943-44). He also played once for Halifax Town A.F.C. in 1945-46.

Fred died in Tamworth, Staffordshire on 2 September 1982.
