= Fred Smith (cricketer, born 1879) =

English cricketer

Fred Smith (18 December 1879 – 20 October 1905) was an English first-class cricketer, who played thirteen matches for Yorkshire County Cricket Club in 1903. He also played for the Yorkshire Second XI in 1903 and 1904.

Born in Yeadon, Yorkshire, England, Smith was a left-handed batsman, who scored 292 runs at 16.22, with a best of 55 against Kent. Smith also scored 51 against Somerset and took three catches.

Smith died in October 1905 in Nelson, Lancashire, England, aged 25.
