= Fred Smith (cricketer, born 1885) =

English cricketer

Fred Smith (26 December 1885 – unknown) was an English first-class cricketer, who played one match for Yorkshire County Cricket Club in 1911. He also appeared for the Yorkshire Second XI from 1907 to 1909, and the Bradford League in 1911.

Smith was born in Idle, Yorkshire, England, and he scored eleven runs in his only innings for the county, against the Indian tourists. Smith also took two wickets for 45. Yorkshire won the match by an innings and 43 runs.

The details of his death are not known.
