= The Other Club =

British political dining society

The Other Club is a British political dining society founded in 1911 by Winston Churchill and F. E. Smith. It met to dine fortnightly in the Pinafore Room at the Savoy Hotel during periods when Parliament was in session. The club's members over the years have included many leading British political and non-political men.

== History ==
Churchill, who in 1910 was Liberal Home Secretary, and barrister and Conservative MP F. E. Smith had not been invited to join the venerable political dining club known just as The Club. Although both had friends in it, the members thought Churchill and Smith too controversial. So they established their own club, to be called by contrast "The Other Club".

The initial membership was 12 Liberals, 12 Conservatives, and 12 "distinguished outsiders" who were not in politics. With the help of David Lloyd George (then Chancellor of the Exchequer) another non-member of The Club, they put together such a list and the first dinner was on 18 May 1911. The Chief Whips of the two parties were co-secretaries of the club, so that pairs could be arranged, meaning members' dinner would not be interrupted by divisions in the parliament.

Twelve rules were written for the club, mostly by F. E. Smith, and they were, and are still, read aloud at each dinner. Churchill claimed to have contributed the last: 12. Nothing in the rules or intercourse of the Club shall interfere with the rancour or asperity of party politics, although the so-called Birkenhead school ascribes this to Smith. In any case debate was vigorous, and Churchill insisted on attending even at the height of the Blitz in 1940/41.

Election to the club depended on Smith and Churchill believing members to be "men with whom it was agreeable to dine". After Smith's death in 1930, Churchill became practically the sole arbiter and election was the greatest honour he could confer on those he considered both estimable and entertaining. Both those characteristics were required, so that many he considered estimable, but not entertaining, were not elected. That included Lord Woolton, Clement Attlee, John Anderson and Lord Halifax.

Anthony Eden was invited to join, but declined since he disliked dining clubs. Charles Wilson, created Lord Moran, was Churchill's physician for many years and in the late 1950s asked outright to be elected. This was surprisingly forthright, and Churchill felt that he could not hurt the doctor's feelings by refusing. After Churchill's death, Moran published a controversial book Winston Churchill, the Struggle for Survival which offended Churchill's friends for discussing matters normally confidential between a doctor and patient. The members of the club thus asked him to resign, though he himself saw no reason to do so. Churchill met Aristotle Onassis in the south of France and became such friends as to elect him to the club, to the astonishment of other members.

The club continued after Churchill's death, but there has been no executive committee since 1970.

== Members ==
The membership over the years, as John Colville put it, reads like an index to contemporary British history. In 1997 The Times published a list of people whose names appeared on the club's January 1994 List of Members. These were (joining dates in parentheses):

- Sir Antony Acland (1984)
- Edward Adeane (1981)
- Earl of Airlie (1986)
- Lord Aldington (1971)
- Lord Alexander of Weedon (1993)
- Lord Amery (1960)
- Lord Annan (1989)
- Lord Armstrong of Ilminster (1973)
- Paddy Ashdown (1991)
- Lord Barber of Wentbridge (1971)
- Tony Blair (1991)
- Tom Bradley (1976)
- Sir Leon Brittan (1984)
- Gordon Brown (1991)
- Duke of Buccleuch & Queensbury (1971)
- Sir Robin Butler (1991)
- Viscount Camrose (1954)
- Lord Carr of Hadley (1970)
- Lord Carrington (1962)
- Sir Edward Cazalet (1984)
- Paul Channon (1973)
- Charles, Prince of Wales (1976)
- Lord Charteris of Amisfield (1969)
- Winston S. Churchill (1993)
- Kenneth Clarke (1993)
- Robin Cook (1993)
- Viscount Cranborne (1981)
- John Cunningham (1984)
- Lord Dacre of Glanton (1978)
- Sir Robin Day (1981)
- Sir William Deakin (1961)
- Duke of Devonshire (1960)
- Lord Egremont (1986)
- Lord Gilmour (1973)
- Lord Goodman (1967)
- Lord Nicholas Gordon-Lennox (1978)
- John Grigg (1993)
- Lord Hailsham of St Marylebone (1970)
- Lord Hartwell (1955)
- Max Hastings (1993)
- Roy Hattersley (1971)
- Sir Edward Heath (1960)
- Sir Nicholas Henderson (1976)
- Lord Home of the Hirsel (1961)
- Marmaduke Hussey (1989)
- Lord Hutchinson (1978)
- Earl Jellicoe (1978)
- Roy Jenkins (1964)
- Ludovic Kennedy (1991)
- Tom King (1989)
- Lord Kingsdown (1991)
- Viscount Lambton (1961)
- Bernard Levin (1986)
- Lord Lever of Manchester (1969)
- Dickson Mabon (1978)
- Sir Fitzroy Maclean (1969)
- David Marquand (1976)
- Lord Marsh (1971)
- Anthony Montague Browne (1958)
- Lord Moore of Wolvercote (1978)
- John Mortimer (1993)
- Christopher Patten (1986)
- Lord Peyton (1971)
- Lord Prior (1978)
- John Profumo (1960)
- Lord Pym (1981)
- Lord Rees-Mogg (1973)
- Lord Richardson of Duntisbourne (1973)
- Lord Rothschild (1986)
- Lord Shawcross (1953)
- Peter Shore (1981)
- John Smith (1986)
- Lord St John of Fawsley (1984)
- Nicholas Soames (1989)
- Sir David Steel (1976)
- Tom Stoppard (1993)
- Lord Tebbit (1984)
- Sir Denis Thatcher (1989)
- Lord Thomas of Swynnerton (1981)
- Peter Thorneycroft (1960)
- Jeremy Thorpe (1971)
- William Waldegrave (1981)
- Lord Walker (1971)
- Lord Weinstock (1978)
- Viscount Whitelaw (1967)
- Lord Wilson of Rievaulx (1966)
- Lord Wyatt of Weeford (1986)
- Lord Younger (1986)

Other past members have included:

- Lord Asquith of Bishopstone
- Lord Beaverbrook
- Lord Alanbrooke
- Arnold Bennett
- Viscount Bennett
- Lord Birkenhead
- Bob Boothby
- Lord Bracken
- Lord Camrose
- Walter Elliot
- Lord Gort
- Harcourt Johnstone
- John Maynard Keynes
- Lord Kitchener
- Sir John Lavery
- Lloyd George
- Sir Edwin Lutyens
- A. E. W. Mason
- Lord Montgomery
- Lord Moyne
- Sir Alfred Munnings
- Edward Marsh
- Sir Robert Menzies
- Oswald Mosley (Elected in 1930, and withdrew in 1935)
- Lord Normanbrook
- Lord Norwich
- Lord Olivier
- Aristotle Onassis
- Sir William Orpen
- Charles Portal
- Lord Rothermere
- Leslie Rowan
- Jan Smuts
- Sir Mark Sykes
- Sir Herbert Beerbohm Tree
- Lord Trenchard
- Josiah Wedgwood
- H. G. Wells
- Lewis Douglas
- P. G. Wodehouse

== Sources ==
- John Colville, The Churchillians, 1981, ISBN 0-297-77909-5, chapter 1.
- Derek Wilson, "Dark and Light", Weidenfeld & Nicolson, London 1998, ISBN 0-297-81718-3, p. 227.
