= Subsidy roll =

Historic records of taxation

Subsidy rolls are records of taxation in England made between the 12th and 17th centuries. They are often valuable sources of historical information.

The lists are arranged by county, and the description of each document indicates the area covered, usually by hundred or wapentake. The 1332 subsidy was the first for which many assessments survive. It was primarily confined to prosperous householders. The poll tax returns of 1378–80, which in theory covered all male adults except the itinerant and the very poor, give occupations and the relationships between members of the household. The subsidies of 1532–1535 again covered extensively the householders of middling and higher status.

The best known surviving assessments are probably the hearth tax returns from 1662–1674, which give the names of householders and number of hearths for which they were responsible. County volumes of liable householders have been published by the British Record Society.

Records of many other taxes are listed in Jurkowski, Smith & Crook (1998).
