= Frederick Smith, 3rd Earl of Birkenhead =

The Right Honourable The Earl of Birkenhead

Member of the House of Lords Lord Temporal
- In office 10 June 1975 – 16 February 1985; Hereditary Peerage
- Preceded by: The 2nd Earl of Birkenhead
- Succeeded by: Peerage extinct

Personal details
- Born: Frederick William Robin Smith; 17 April 1936
- Died: 16 February 1985 (aged 48)
- Writing career
- Pen name: Robin Furneaux
- Notable works: The Amazon: The Story of a Great River (1971); William Wilberforce (1974)
- Notable awards: Heinemann Award (1975)

Frederick William Robin Smith, 3rd Earl of Birkenhead (17 April 1936 – 16 February 1985) was a British writer, historian and hereditary peer. He wrote under the pseudonym Robin Furneaux.

== Biography ==
Viscount Furneaux was his courtesy title prior to the 1975 death of his father, Frederick Smith, 2nd Earl of Birkenhead, at which time he succeeded to the earldom. His grandfather, F. E. Smith, 1st Earl of Birkenhead, had been a British Lord Chancellor and a close personal friend of Winston Churchill.

Writing under his pen name of Robin Furneaux, Lord Birkenhead won the Heinemann Award in 1975 for William Wilberforce (ISBN 9781573833431), his biography of the antislavery campaigner. He also was known for his 1970 book The Amazon: The Story of a Great River (ASIN B0007JSBL4), based on an expedition he made along the Amazon River in 1968.

Lord Birkenhead was a contract bridge player, participating in an annual competition between members of the House of Lords and the House of Commons. He was part of a British team that visited Washington, D.C., in 1984 and defeated an American team including Supreme Court Justice John Paul Stevens.

He died of a heart attack aged 48 whilst playing real tennis at the Leamington Spa Tennis and Squash Club. The title became extinct upon his death.

== Arms ==
Coat of arms of Frederick Smith, 3rd Earl of Birkenhead
Crest A cubit arm couped fessways vested Gules cuffed Argent the hand Proper grasping a sword erect also Argent pommel and hilt Or. Escutcheon Ermine on a pale Gules between four cross crosslets of the second a like cross Or. Supporters Dexter a griffin Or wings per fess Or and Sable, sinister a lion Azure charged on the shoulder with a crozier Or. Motto Faber Meæ Fortunæ

Peerage of the United Kingdom
Preceded by Frederick Winston Furneaux Smith	Earl of Birkenhead; 1975–1985	Extinct
