= Frederick Smith, 2nd Earl of Birkenhead =

British biographer and peer (1907–1975)

The Right Honourable The Earl of Birkenhead
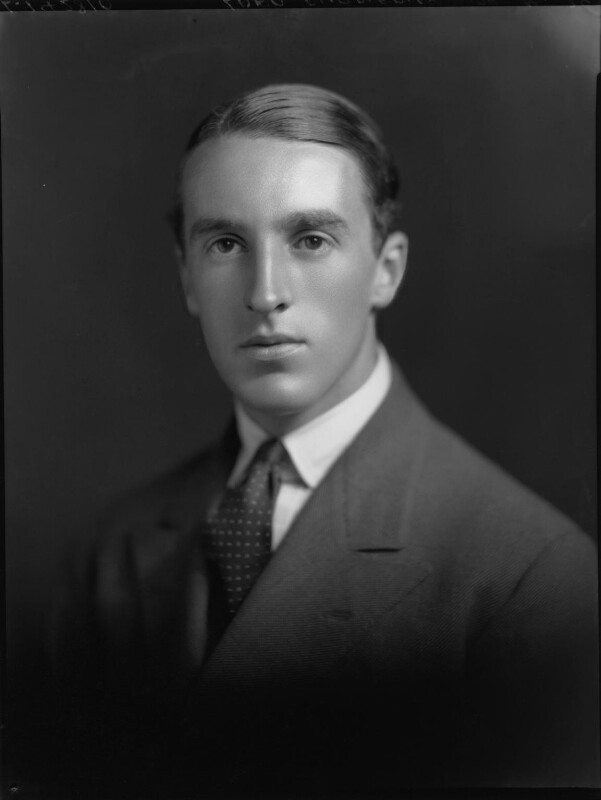
- Birkenhead in 1929

Lord-in-Waiting Government Whip
- In office 5 November 1951 – 28 January 1955
- Monarchs: George VI; Elizabeth II
- Prime Minister: Winston Churchill
- Preceded by: The Lord Burden
- Succeeded by: The Lord Chesham
- In office 12 July 1938 – 10 May 1940
- Monarch: George VI
- Prime Minister: Neville Chamberlain
- Preceded by: The Earl of Munster
- Succeeded by: The Viscount Clifden

Member of the House of Lords Lord Temporal
- In office 30 September 1930 – 10 June 1975; Hereditary Peerage
- Preceded by: The 1st Earl of Birkenhead
- Succeeded by: The 3rd Earl of Birkenhead

Personal details
- Born: Frederick Winston Furneaux Smith; 7 December 1907 London, England
- Died: 10 June 1975 (aged 67) Oxford, England
- Party: Conservative
- Spouse: Sheila Berry (m. 1935)
- Children: Frederick Smith, 3rd Earl of Birkenhead; Lady Juliet Townsend
- Education: Eton College; Christ Church, Oxford
- Writing career
- Notable work: Rudyard Kipling (1978)

Frederick Winston Furneaux Smith, 2nd Earl of Birkenhead (7 December 1907 – 10 June 1975) was a British biographer and Member of the House of Lords. He is best known for writing a biography of Rudyard Kipling that was suppressed by the Kipling family for many years, and which he never lived to see in print.

== Background ==
The son of F. E. Smith, 1st Earl of Birkenhead, he was born in London and was known as Viscount Furneaux from 1922, when his father, then 1st Viscount Birkenhead, was created Earl of Birkenhead. He had two sisters, Eleanor (1902–1945) and Pamela (1914–1982). Lord Furneaux was educated at Eton and Christ Church, Oxford. He inherited his father's peerages in 1930.

For the first three years of the Second World War, Lord Birkenhead served with a Territorial Army Anti-Tank unit. Following a course at the Staff College, Camberley, Major "Freddy" Birkenhead was assigned to the Foreign Office's Political Intelligence Department, popularly known as the Political Warfare Executive, or PWE for short. He saw action in Croatia, as second-in-command of a sub-mission headed by Randolph Churchill, under Brigadier Fitzroy Maclean's 37th Military Mission, which included Evelyn Waugh. As a result, he plays a prominent role in Waugh's diaries.

== Career ==
Lord Birkenhead served as Parliamentary Private Secretary to Lord Halifax (1938–1939), and as Lord-in-waiting to King George VI (1938–1940 and 1951–1952) and Queen Elizabeth II (1952–1955).

In the documentary 'The Man Who Destroyed Oscar Wilde' broadcast by PBS America, Merlin Holland - grandson of Irish poet, author and playwright Oscar Wilde, explains that Lord Birkenhead (who was Holland's godfather) offered help to H. Montgomery Hyde with his biography of Edward Carson. Lord Birkenhead wrote Hyde a letter in 1950 (which is held in the Public Record Office of Northern Ireland), that he had known Carson and could tell him first hand of what Carson had said about his part in the infamous court case which led to the downfall, disgrace and subsequent imprisonment of Wilde.

As a writer, Lord Birkenhead primarily authored political biographies, including books on Lord Cherwell and Lord Halifax. In the late 1940s, Lord Birkenhead was commissioned by Rudyard Kipling's daughter Elsie Bambridge to write a biography of Kipling. An agreement with Lord Birkenhead gave Bambridge control over the contents, ownership of copyright, and two-thirds of any profits. Ultimately, Bambridge did not accept Lord Birkenhead's work, and it remained unpublished through his death in 1975 and her death in 1976. The biography was finally published in 1978 with the agreement of Bambridge's heirs.

== Personal life and death ==
In 1935, he married The Hon Sheila Berry (1913–1992), second daughter of the 1st Viscount Camrose. The couple had a son, Frederick William Robin Smith, 3rd Earl of Birkenhead, in 1936 and a daughter, Lady Juliet Margaret Smith (later Lady Juliet Townsend), in 1941. Lady Juliet served as Lady in Waiting to Princess Margaret from 1965 to 2002; her daughter Eleanor Townsend is a god-child of the Princess. Lady Juliet was made a Dame Commander of the Royal Victorian Order (DCVO) in the 2014 Birthday Honours having previously received the LVO in 1981 and was Lord Lieutenant of Northamptonshire from 1998 to 2014. She died on 29 November 2014.

Lord Birkenhead died at a nursing home in Oxford on 10 June 1975, at age 67. At the time of his death, he was working on a biography of Winston Churchill (who was his godfather); the completed portion, covering Churchill's life until 1922, was published in 1989.

== Books ==
- F.E.: The Life of F.E. Smith, first Earl of Birkenhead (London, Eyre and Spottiswoode, 1960).
- The Professor and the Prime Minister: The Official Life of Professor F. A. Lindemann Viscount Cherwell. Boston: Houghton Mifflin Company. 1961. LCCN 61-15385.
- Frederick Edwin Earl of Birkenhead (1933 and 1936)
- Strafford (Hutchinson & Co. Ltd, 1938) ASIN B0006AO3R0
- Lady Eleanor Smith: a memoir (1953) ASIN B000G3JKWU
- Life of Lord Halifax (1965) ISBN 978-0241902264
- The life of Viscount Monckton of Brenchley (1969) ISBN 978-0297176992
- Rudyard Kipling (1978) ISBN 978-0297775355
- Churchill, 1874–1922 (1989) ISBN 978-0245547799

== Arms ==
Coat of arms of Frederick Smith, 2nd Earl of Birkenhead
Crest A cubit arm couped fessways vested Gules cuffed Argent the hand Proper grasping a sword erect also Argent pommel and hilt Or. Escutcheon Ermine on a pale Gules between four cross crosslets of the second a like cross Or. Supporters Dexter a griffin Or wings per fess Or and Sable, sinister a lion Azure charged on the shoulder with a crozier Or. Motto Faber Meæ Fortunæ

Political offices
Preceded by The Earl of Munster	Lord-in-waiting; 1938 – 1940	Succeeded by New government
Preceded by New government	Lord-in-waiting; 1951 – 1955	Succeeded by The Lord Chesham
Peerage of the United Kingdom
Preceded by F. E. Smith	Earl of Birkenhead; 1930 – 1975	Succeeded by Frederick Smith
