= F. E. Smith, 1st Earl of Birkenhead =

British politician (1872–1930)

The Right Honourable The Earl of Birkenhead GCSI PC DL
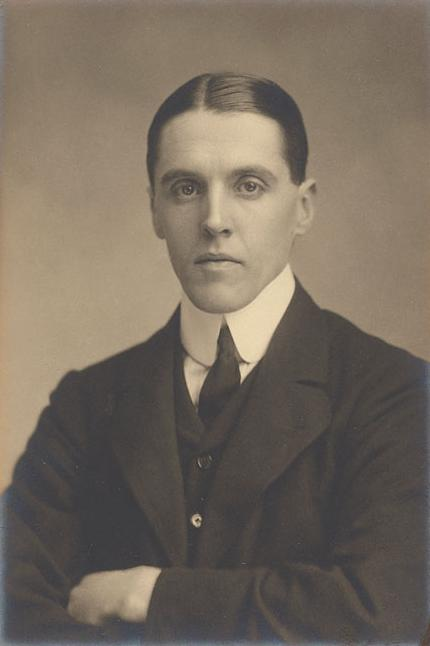

Lord Chancellor
- In office 10 January 1919 – 19 October 1922
- Monarch: George V
- Prime Minister: David Lloyd George
- Preceded by: The Lord Finlay
- Succeeded by: The Viscount Cave

Secretary of State for India
- In office 6 November 1924 – 18 October 1928
- Prime Minister: Stanley Baldwin
- Preceded by: The Lord Olivier
- Succeeded by: The Viscount Peel

Attorney General for England and Wales
- In office 3 November 1915 – 10 January 1919
- Prime Minister: H. H. Asquith
- Preceded by: Sir Edward Carson
- Succeeded by: Sir Gordon Hewart

Solicitor General for England and Wales
- In office 2 June 1915 – 8 November 1915
- Prime Minister: H. H. Asquith
- Preceded by: Sir Stanley Buckmaster
- Succeeded by: Sir George Cave

Member of the House of Lords Lord Temporal
- In office 3 February 1919 – 30 September 1930; Hereditary Peerage
- Preceded by: Peerage created
- Succeeded by: The 2nd Earl of Birkenhead

Member of Parliament for Liverpool Walton
- In office 8 February 1906 – 14 December 1918
- Preceded by: James Henry Stock
- Succeeded by: Harry Chilcott

Personal details
- Born: Frederick Edwin Smith; 12 July 1872 Birkenhead, Cheshire, England
- Died: 30 September 1930 (aged 58) Belgravia, London, England
- Party: Conservative
- Spouse: Margaret Eleanor Furneaux (m. 1901)
- Children: Eleanor; Frederick; Pamela
- Education: University of Liverpool; Wadham College, Oxford

Frederick Edwin Smith, 1st Earl of Birkenhead, GCSI, PC, DL (12 July 1872 – 30 September 1930) was a British Conservative politician and barrister who attained high office in the early 20th century, in particular as Attorney-General and post War as Lord High Chancellor of Great Britain. He was a skilled orator, noted for his staunch opposition to Irish nationalism, his wit, pugnacious views, and hard living and drinking. He is perhaps best remembered today as Winston Churchill's greatest personal and political friend until Birkenhead's death aged 58 from pneumonia caused by cirrhosis of the liver.

== Early life and schooling ==
Smith was born at 38 Pilgrim Street, Birkenhead in Cheshire, the eldest son and second of five surviving children of Frederick Smith (1845–1888), a barrister, and Elizabeth (1842–1928), daughter of Edwin Taylor, a rate collector, of Birkenhead. His father had joined the family business as an estate agent, later becoming a barrister and local Tory politician. Frederick Smith senior died at the age of forty-three, only a month after being elected mayor of Birkenhead.

Smith was educated first at a dame school in Birkenhead, then at Sandringham School in Southport (where he announced, at the age of ten, his ambition to become lord chancellor), and then, having failed the entrance exam for Harrow School, at Birkenhead School (1887–1889).

== Oxford ==
Smith won a scholarship to University College, Liverpool, where he spent four terms (a fact he subsequently suppressed).

He won a scholarship to Wadham College, Oxford, in 1891. Smith made his name as an Oxford "swell", distinguishing himself by his dark good looks, his energy, his unashamed ambition and his scathing wit. He was the dominant figure of a group of Wadham contemporaries including the athlete C. B. Fry, the future Liberal politician John Simon, and the Liberal economist Francis Hirst. Between them they dominated both the rugby field and the Oxford Union Society.

Smith was already active in national politics as a Tory speaker in the July 1892 general election. Announced initially as his father's son, he spoke all over Lancashire, stirring up Orange opinion against the Liberal policy of Irish home rule.

He obtained a Second Class in Classical Mods before switching to Law. He often debated against Hilaire Belloc at the Oxford Union, where a bust of him now stands, and became President in Trinity term 1894. By massive last-minute cramming he graduated with a first class BA degree in law in 1895.

To his disappointment, he only obtained a Second in his Bachelor of Civil Law degree. In 1896 he won the Vinerian law scholarship and was elected a fellow of Merton College (1896–9), and also a lecturership at Oriel College. The F. E. Smith Memorial Mooting Prizes nowadays commemorate him at Merton. In later life his depth of legal learning often surprised critics.

Smith added to his Oxford reputation in May 1897, when he went to see the Prince of Wales open the new Oxford Town Hall. A detachment of the Metropolitan Police Mounted Branch had been drafted in to reinforce the small Oxford City Police force against a large demonstration of university undergraduates. The Metropolitan Police, who were unused to boisterous Oxford undergraduates, attacked them with batons, causing several serious injuries. The crowd unhorsed and trampled one policeman. Smith took no part in the disorder, but was arrested when he tried to rescue his college servant, who was being manhandled by the police. Smith became the first prisoner in the police station in the new Town Hall. Before being locked in, Smith raised his hands for silence and declared "I have great pleasure in declaring this cell open". He was tried for obstructing the police in the lawful execution of their duty, but was found not guilty after defending himself in court.

== Career as a barrister ==
Having eaten his dinners at Gray's Inn and passed his bar finals with distinction in the summer of 1899, Smith was called to the Bar and finally left Oxford, and quickly built up a brilliant and lucrative practice on the Northern Circuit, initially basing himself in Liverpool.

=== Formidable style and high-profile court cases ===
Smith rapidly acquired a reputation as a formidable advocate, first in Liverpool and then, after his election to Parliament in 1906, in London. He was junior counsel during the prosecution of John McKeever tried at Liverpool Assizes for the murder of the Protestant activist John Kensit. Although McKeever was acquitted, Smith kept the weapon, a file or chisel and a photograph of where the incident took place in his chambers.

In 1907 he was asked to give an opinion on a proposed libel action by the Lever Brothers against newspapers owned by Lord Northcliffe concerning the latter's allegations of a conspiracy to raise the price of soap by means of a 'soap trust'. He checked into the Savoy and, after working all night reading a pile of papers nearly four feet thick and consuming a bottle of champagne and two dozen oysters, Smith wrote a one-sentence opinion: "There is no answer to this action in libel, and the damages must be enormous". The newspapers subsequently paid Lever £50,000, more than four times the previous record for a defamation action or out-of-court published settlement in the country.

In February 1908, Smith was made a King's Counsel by Lord Loreburn, on the same day as his friend and rival from Wadham College, future Home Secretary Sir John Simon. At the Bar, he became one of the best known and most highly paid barristers in the country, making over £10,000 per year before the First World War. His spending was commensurate with this income even after he took less well-paid government positions in later years, something of which he would bitterly complain. Part of his income funded the purchase of a country house, The Cottage at Charlton, Northamptonshire, in 1907. The house was greatly enlarged in 1911–1912.

In one of the best-known cases in which Smith was involved he successfully defended Ethel le Neve, mistress of Hawley Harvey Crippen ("Dr. Crippen"), against a charge of murder. Le Neve was accused of killing Crippen's wife. Crippen was tried separately and convicted.

== Member of Parliament ==
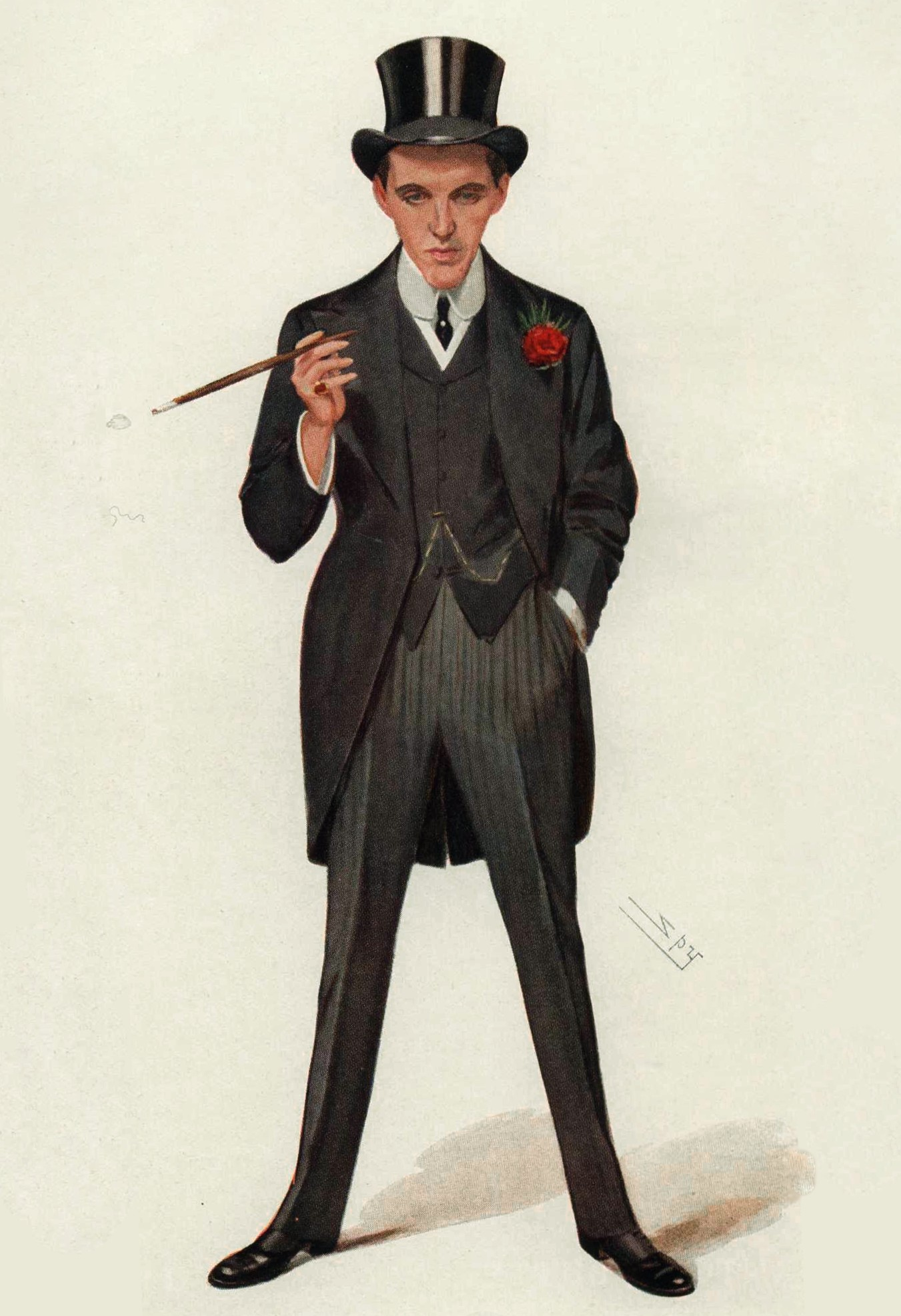
"A Successful First Speech ("Moab is my Washpot")" FE Smith MP depicted in Vanity Fair, January 1907

Ambitious to enter Parliament, Smith cultivated the local Tory boss Archibald Salvidge.

In 1903, Smith gave a dazzling speech in Liverpool in support of Joseph Chamberlain, who was campaigning for Tariff Reform. On the strength of this, he was selected three months later as candidate for the working-class constituency of Walton division. He campaigned as the champion of hard-drinking, patriotic working men (Liberals tended to favour temperance and more pacific foreign policy) and in the 1906 election he narrowly held the seat despite the national Liberal landslide. He held the seat until the redrawing of boundaries in 1918.

He attracted attention by a brilliant maiden speech, "I Warn the Government..." After this speech, Tim Healy, the Irish Nationalist, a master of parliamentary invective, sent Smith a note, "I am old, and you are young, but you have beaten me at my own game." In his maiden speech he argued that advocating tariffs had not hurt the Tories at the recent election. Smith also opposed the Trade Disputes Act 1906 arguing that intimidatory picketing should not be allowed. The Conservative leadership, unwilling to antagonise organised labour, did not oppose the Act very hard.

Smith did not support restriction on the powers of the House of Lords, fearing that tyranny could result from an unchecked unicameral parliament.

He was soon a prominent leader of the Unionist wing of the Conservative Party, especially in the planned Ulster resistance to Irish Home Rule. He attended the Blenheim Unionist rally on 27 July 1912, at which Bonar Law advocated forcible resistance. From the signing of the Ulster Covenant in September 1912 onwards, he was often at Edward Carson's side on horseback, hence the derisive nickname "Galloper Smith".

A vociferous opponent of the Disestablishment of the Welsh part of the Church of England, he called the Welsh Disestablishment Bill "a bill which has shocked the conscience of every Christian community in Europe". This prompted G. K. Chesterton to write a satirical poem, "Antichrist, Or the Reunion of Christendom: An Ode", which asked if Breton sailors, Russian peasants and Christians evicted by the Turks would know or care of what happened to the Anglican Church in Wales, and answered the question with the line "Chuck it, Smith". The bill was approved by Parliament under the provisions of the Parliament Act 1911, but was stalled by the outbreak of the First World War. When it was finally implemented in 1920, Smith was part of the Lloyd George coalition that did so.

== First World War ==
Smith had joined the Territorial Army by commission into the Queen's Own Oxfordshire Hussars, in which Churchill was already an officer, in 1913, and was a captain in the regiment before the outbreak of the First World War. On its outbreak he was placed in charge of the Government's Press Bureau, with rank of full colonel and responsibility for newspaper censorship. He was not very successful in this role, and in 1914–1915 served in France as a staff officer with the Indian Corps with ultimate temporary rank of lieutenant-colonel. He and his successor as 'recording officer' (a Colonel Merewether) later collaborated on an official history entitled The Indian Corps in France (published 1917).

In May 1915, he was appointed Solicitor General by H. H. Asquith and knighted. He soon after (in October 1915) succeeded his friend Sir Edward Carson as Attorney General, with the right to attend Cabinet. Early in 1916 he was briefly placed under military arrest for arriving at Boulogne without a pass, and had to be 'appeased' by a meeting with General Sir Douglas Haig.

As Attorney General, he took responsibility to lead the prosecution for the Crown in major cases such as the trial in 1916 of the Irish nationalist Sir Roger Casement for treason. Sir Roger had been captured after landing from a Kaiserliche Marine U-boat on Banna Strand in Tralee Bay in north County Kerry, south-west Ireland, just a few days before the Easter Rising in late April 1916. Leading the prosecution in 1916 of Casement and, again, in 1917 of Alice Wheeldon and her family contributed to Smith's reputation as a spectacular advocate at the time.

Smith was made a baronet in 1918. Following abolition of the Walton seat in constituency boundary changes, Smith was returned at the December 1918 general election for neighbouring West Derby Division, only to be elevated to the House of Lords two months later.

== Lord Chancellor in the postwar coalition ==
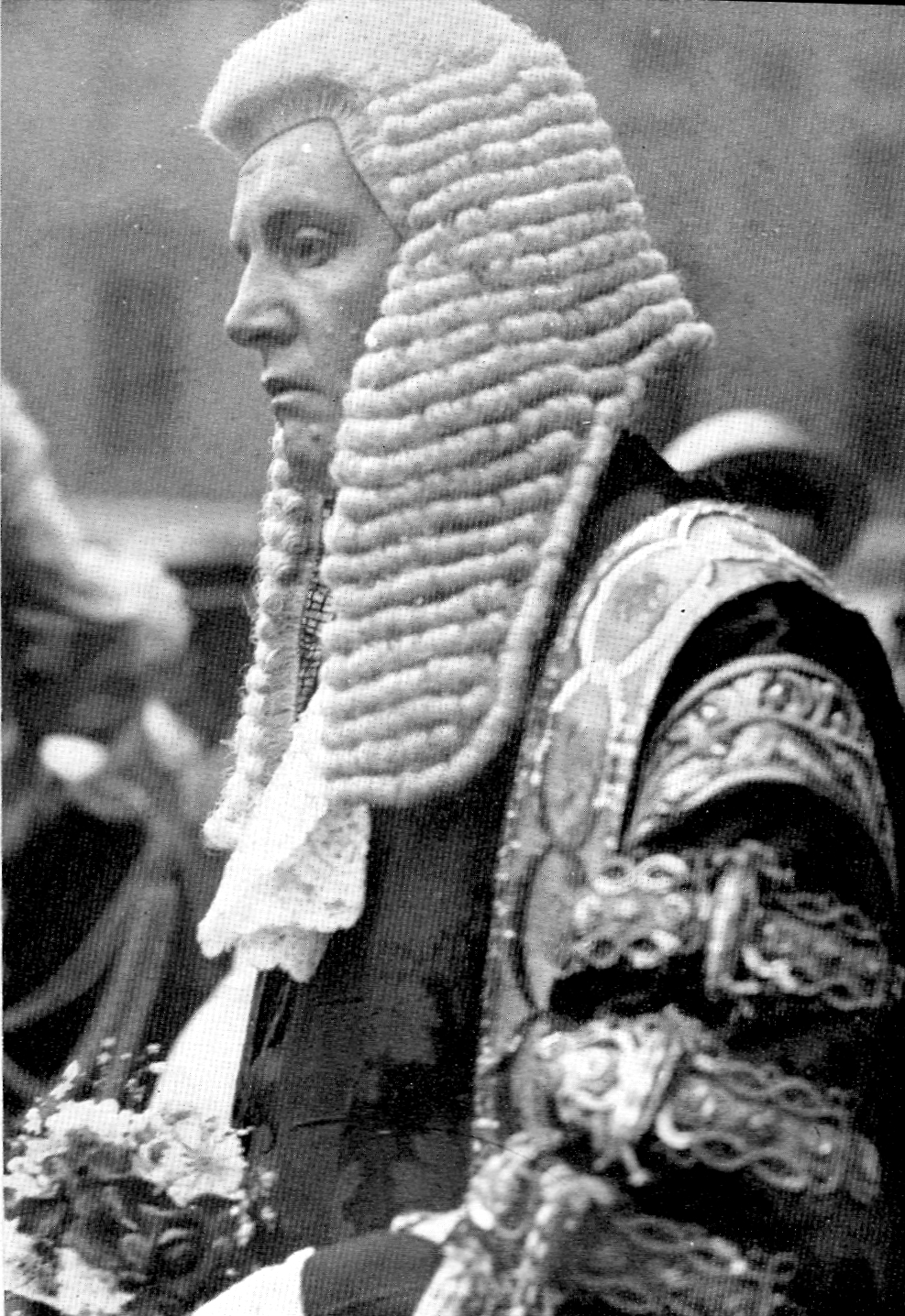
Sir F. E. Smith, newly created Lord Birkenhead, on his appointment as Lord Chancellor

In 1919, he was created Baron Birkenhead, of Birkenhead in the County of Chester following his appointment as Lord Chancellor by Lloyd George. At the age of 47, he was the youngest Lord Chancellor since Lord Cowper in 1707 and possibly since Judge Jeffreys (John Simon would have been younger had he accepted the post in 1915). The Morning Post commented that his appointment as Attorney-General had been amusing but that his further promotion was "carrying a joke beyond the limits of pleasantry", while the King urged Lloyd George to reconsider. Birkenhead proved an excellent Lord Chancellor, but tales of his drunkenness begin from this time, very likely as he grew bored with the job and as it dawned on him that he had probably ruled himself out from the premiership by accepting a peerage.

That year, in the House of Lords debate on the Amritsar Massacre, he courageously denounced Tories who declared General Dyer (the responsible officer) a hero. He played a key role in the passage of several key legal reforms, including the Law of Property Act 1922, which began the reform of English land law which was to come to fruition in the mid-1920s. He also unsuccessfully championed a reform of the divorce laws, which he judged caused great misery and which favoured the wealthy.

Despite his Unionist background, Smith played an important role in the negotiations that led to the signature of the Anglo-Irish Treaty in 1921, which led to the formation of the Irish Free State the following year. Much of the treaty was drafted by Smith. His support for this, and his warm relations with the Irish nationalist leaders Arthur Griffith and Michael Collins, angered some of his former Unionist associates, notably Sir Edward Carson. Upon signing the Treaty he remarked to Collins, "I may have just signed my political death warrant", to which Collins dryly and with prescient accuracy replied, "I have just signed my actual death warrant". Collins was killed by opponents of the treaty eight months after the signing, during the Irish Civil War.

Also in 1921, he was responsible for the House of Lords rejecting a proposal, put forward by Frederick Alexander Macquisten, MP for Argyllshire, to criminalise lesbianism. During the debate, Birkenhead argued that 999 women out of a thousand had "never even heard a whisper of these practices".

Smith was created Viscount Birkenhead, of Birkenhead in the County of Chester, in the 1921 Birthday Honours, then Viscount Furneaux, of Charlton in the County of Northampton, and Earl of Birkenhead in 1922. He chose as his armorial motto "Faber Meae Fortunae" ("I am the Smith of my own Fortune"). By 1922 Birkenhead and Churchill had become the leading figures of the Lloyd George Coalition. The Anglo-Irish Treaty, the attempt to go to war with Turkey over Chanak (which was later vetoed by the governments of the Dominions) and a general whiff of moral and financial corruption which had come to surround the Coalition were all hallmarks of his tenure in office.

A scandal erupted in 1922 when it became known that Lloyd George, through the agency of Maundy Gregory, had awarded honours and titles such as a baronetcy to rich businessmen in return for cash in the range of £10,000 and more. At an earlier meeting before Parliament broke up for the summer, and more famously at the Carlton Club meeting in October 1922, Birkenhead's hectoring of the junior ministers and backbenchers was one of the factors leading to the withdrawal of support from the Coalition.

== Out of office: 1922–24 ==
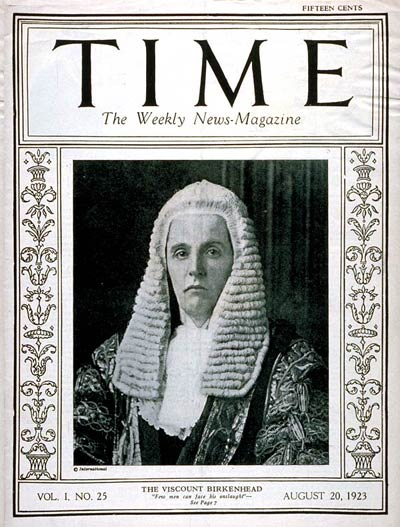
Time cover, 20 Aug 1923

Like many of the senior members of the Coalition, Birkenhead did not hold office in the Bonar Law and Baldwin governments of 1922–24. Unlike the others Birkenhead was rude and open in his contempt for the new governments. He bore no grudge against Bonar Law but criticised Leslie Wilson and Lord Curzon. He sneered that Wilson and Sir George Younger were "the cabin boys" who had taken over the ship, he referred to Lords Salisbury and Selborne as "the Dolly Sisters" after two starlets of the era and remarked that the new Cabinet was one of "second-class brains", to which came the reply from Lord Robert Cecil that this was better than "second-class characters". He remarked that he had lost the Woolsack but was still "captain of [his] own soul" to which a wag retorted that this was "a small command of which no-one will want to deprive him".

In the House of Lords, on 7 December 1922, he read out a letter dated 15 February 1922 in which the Greek leader Dimitrios Gounaris had begged the Foreign Secretary Lord Curzon (who had deserted the Coalition in its final hours and thus retained his office under Bonar Law) for British help in her war against Turkey. Since then, Gounaris had been executed as a scapegoat for the catastrophic Greek defeat. Birkenhead claimed that he had no knowledge of this letter, a claim which was soon echoed by Lloyd George and other leading coalitionists Austen Chamberlain, Robert Horne and Laming Worthington-Evans. The accusations, if true, might have forced Curzon's resignation and jeopardised the ongoing negotiation of the Treaty of Lausanne. Cabinet Secretary Maurice Hankey located the letter, and the reply urging Gounaris to "hold on", which Curzon had circulated to the Cabinet, and which Birkenhead had initialled as read. On 11 December Birkenhead was forced to offer an apology ("frigidly received" by the Lords, according to The Times). Lady Curzon retaliated by cutting him at a ball, but as she remarked to her husband in a letter, he was "too drunk to notice" the snub.

In May 1923, Stanley Baldwin succeeded Bonar Law as Prime Minister. He remarked to his new Cabinet, referring to Birkenhead's exclusion, that they were "a Cabinet of faithful husbands" – this referred to Birkenhead's general character rather than simply his marital infidelities.

Even a famous speech, the Rectorial Address to the University of Glasgow on 7 November 1923, in which Birkenhead told undergraduates that the world still offered "glittering prizes" to those with "stout hearts and sharp swords", now seemed out of kilter with the less aggressive and more self-consciously moral style of politics advocated by the new generation of Conservative politicians such as Stanley Baldwin and Edward Wood, the future Lord Halifax. Birkenhead regarded the League of Nations as idealistic nonsense, and thought that international relations should be guided by "self-interest", lest Britain decline like Imperial Spain. Rather, he believed that the power of nations would still be determined by their military strength.

By this time Birkenhead was regarded with distaste by much of the grassroots Conservative Party. J. C. C. Davidson reported back to Central Office (18 November 1923) on his recent re-adoption as candidate for Hemel Hempstead that many members were unwilling to support him without an assurance that he would not support Birkenhead's return to the Cabinet, lest this cost local votes at the upcoming election. He commented that this was proof that Puritanism was deep in the English blood, and not just in that of Nonconformist chapel-goers. Neville Chamberlain recorded in his diary (18 November 1923) that Birkenhead had "so often and so deeply shocked the moral sense of the country by his drunkenness and loose living character that our Govt which rests largely on public confidence in our character would be seriously tarnished by association with such a man".

After the December 1923 General Election, at which Baldwin lost his majority and a hung Parliament was returned, Birkenhead briefly intrigued for another Lloyd George coalition government. In order to discourage them from associating with Lloyd George, Baldwin quickly invited former coalitionists Austen Chamberlain, Birkenhead and Balfour to join the Shadow Cabinet. Birkenhead persuaded his friend Churchill to stand (unsuccessfully, as an independent "Constitutionalist") in the March 1924 Westminster Abbey by-election. This was part of Churchill's move back towards rejoining the Conservative Party.

A 1924 entry in Evelyn Waugh's diary states that an English High Court judge, presiding in a sodomy case, sought advice on sentencing from Lord Birkenhead. "Could you tell me," he asked, "what do you think one ought to give a man who allows himself to be buggered?" Birkenhead replied without hesitation, "Oh, thirty shillings or two pounds; whatever you happen to have on you."

== Personal life and affair ==
Smith married Margaret Eleanor Furneaux, daughter of classical scholar Henry Furneaux, in April 1901. They had three children:

- Lady Eleanor Furneaux Smith (born 7 August 1902, died 20 October 1945)
- Frederick Winston Furneaux Smith, 2nd Earl of Birkenhead (born 7 December 1907, died 10 June 1975)
- Lady Pamela Margaret Elizabeth Smith (born 16 May 1914, died 7 January 1982), married Michael Berry, Baron Hartwell.

In around 1919, Birkenhead began an affair with Mona Dunn, the then seventeen year old daughter of the Canadian financier James Hamet Dunn, a friend of Lord Beaverbrook's (it is unclear how much her father knew of the affair). Beaverbrook, in so far as can be discerned from the limited surviving evidence in letters, appears to have provided a cover for sexual liaisons between the two of them, and for womanising by others of their social circle. She appears to have been genuinely in love with Birkenhead, whereas he was mildly fond of her but regarded her as no more than a mistress. The affair attracted the fury of Birkenhead's daughter, a friend of Mona's, a state of affairs likened by John Campbell to the relations between Lloyd George, his mistress Frances Stevenson, and his daughter Megan.

In 1926 Arnold Bennett published a novel, Lord Raingo, about a self-made millionaire who becomes a peer and a cabinet minister (under a Prime Minister clearly based on Lloyd George), and who keeps a young mistress. The character was actually largely based on Lord Rhondda and Beaverbrook himself. Birkenhead gave an angry interview to the Daily Mail in which he criticised both the novel and the recent practice of Colonel Repington, Colonel House and Margot Asquith in publishing political secrets so close in time to the events. Bennett replied that the character was not based on any single person and anyway that it was not for Birkenhead, who had recently published a potboiler called Famous Trials, to criticise others for writing books to make money. The two men, who were both members of The Other Club, remained on friendly terms.

Mona Dunn had married "Bunny" Tattersall in February 1925. She had a daughter, then died in Paris aged 26 on 19 December 1928, officially of peritonitis. The original text (1983) of John Campbell's biography states that there is no evidence for the tales that she died of a failed abortion. However, later editions contain a footnote adding that it had since come to the author's attention that her husband had been paid off by Birkenhead to enter into a marriage of convenience with her as a cover for their continued affair, and that, the affair now over, she then fled to Paris with a third man, where she died of "appendicitis and drink" (inverted commas in the original). Birkenhead wrote a poem in her memory, which Beaverbrook declined to publish in the Daily Express at the time, but eventually published three decades later in his life of Sir James Dunn.

== Secretary of State for India: 1924–28 ==
Despite winning a large majority at the 1924 election, Baldwin formed a broad new (second) government by appointing former coalitionists such as Birkenhead, Austen Chamberlain and former Liberal Winston Churchill to senior Cabinet posts; this was to discourage them from associating with Lloyd George to revive the 1916-22 Coalition. Birkenhead and Chamberlain lobbied Baldwin to reappoint another former coalitionist, Robert Horne, to the Exchequer, but Baldwin refused and appointed Churchill instead.

From 1924 to 1928 Birkenhead served as Secretary of State for India. His views on pre-partition India's independence movement were gloomy. He thought India's Hindu–Muslim religious divide insurmountable and sought to block advances in native participation in provincial governments that had been granted by the 1919 Montagu–Chelmsford Reforms. His parliamentary private secretary recalled much time ostensibly on India Office business seemed to be spent playing golf. It was in his government role that in October 1927 he unveiled the Neuve-Chapelle Indian Memorial to Indian Army soldiers of no known grave killed on the Western Front in the 1914–18 War. Birkenhead wrote a series of articles (later republished in Last Essays: 1930) about "The peril to India", in which he criticised the Indian Nationalist leaders as "a collection ... of very inferior Kerenskis" and asserted that it was widely accepted that without British rule India would collapse into anarchy. He attacked the Irwin Declaration as "so ambiguous that it is impossible to select from it any clear and unambiguous proposal".

Birkenhead endorsed his old political opponent H. H. Asquith, rather than his Cabinet colleague Lord Cave, in the 1925 University of Oxford Chancellor election. He wrote to The Times on 19 May, describing Asquith as the "greatest living Oxonian", but his support may have done more harm than good, because of his association with the discredited Lloyd George Coalition, and because of his open scepticism both of religion and of the League of Nations. It was quipped that Asquith was "a warming-pan" for Birkenhead's views (a learned Oxford joke, referring to the legend that the Old Pretender had been an impostor baby rather than a rightful heir to the throne). Lord Cave was elected.

He was engaged outside the office in negotiating for the government with the Trades Union Congress to try to avert the 1926 General Strike and he strongly supported the 1927 Trades Disputes Act which required union members to contract into the political levies.

Baldwin remained suspicious of the activities of Birkenhead and the former coalitionists. Beatrice Webb recorded (diary 14 March 1928) him remarking "the future Coalition" when he saw Churchill, Lloyd George and Birkenhead chatting at the end of a state dinner. Lord Cave resigned as Lord Chancellor early in 1928. Birkenhead apparently did not want to return to his old job, but neither did Baldwin offer it to him. According to Neville Chamberlain's diary (28 March 1928), this was because "he might be seen drunk in the street" (Lord Hailsham was appointed instead). Birkenhead retired from the Cabinet in October 1928 to make money in business.

In 1928 he was appointed Knight Grand Commander of the Order of the Star of India.

== Later life and assessments ==
Birkenhead's increasingly pompous oratory caused David Low to caricature him in the 1920s as "Lord Burstinghead". After retiring from politics, he became Rector of the University of Aberdeen, a director of Tate & Lyle, a director of Imperial Chemical Industries, and High Steward of the University of Oxford. In a 1983 biography review, William Camp – who had written a 1960 biography of the man – opined that "F.E. was the quintessential male chauvinist who, almost with his dying breath, dragged himself to the Lords in July 1930 to attack the right of peeresses to take their seats."

In the opinion of Winston Churchill, who was a friend: "He had all the canine virtues in a remarkable degree – courage, fidelity, vigilance, love of chase." As for Margot Asquith, who was not a friend, she thought: "F. E. Smith is very clever, but sometimes his brains go to his head." Of Birkenhead's loyalty, Churchill added: "If he was with you on Monday, he would be the same on Tuesday. And on Thursday, when things looked blue, he would still be marching forward with strong reinforcements."

Gilbert Frankau recalled in his own autobiography Self Portrait, that in 1928 Sir Thomas Horder confided: "Birkenhead's pure eighteenth-century. He belongs to the days of Fox and Pitt. Physically, he has all the strength of our best yeoman stock. Mentally, he's a colossus. But he'll tear himself to pieces by the time he's sixty."

In 1930 he published his utopian The World in 2030 with airbrush illustrations by E. McKnight Kauffer. The book was the subject of considerable controversy as several passages were alleged to have been copied from earlier works by J. B. S. Haldane.

Birkenhead died in his house in Belgravia, London, on 29 September 1930, aged 58, from pneumonia caused by cirrhosis of the liver. After lying in state for three days in Gray's Inn chapel, his body was cremated at Golders Green Crematorium, after which his ashes were buried on 4 October in the parish churchyard at Charlton, Northamptonshire.

=== Screen portrayals ===
As "Lord Birkenhead", he is dramatised in the film Chariots of Fire, as an official of the British Olympic Committee. He is played by actor Nigel Davenport.

His role in the Anglo-Irish treaty negotiations was featured in the penultimate episode of the 1981 BBC Wales biographical series The Life and Times of David Lloyd George,where he was portrayed by Morris Perry.

== Works ==
- International Law in the Far East, 2nd ed. 1908.
- The Licensing Bill, 1908.
- International Law, 4th ed. 1911.
- Poems by Samuel Johnson, LLD.
- Toryism until 1832.
- Speeches, 1906–1909 (2nd ed.).
- The Destruction of Merchant Ships, 1917.
- My American Visit, 1918 (2nd edition).
- The Indian Corps in France (2nd edition).
- The Story of Newfoundland, 1920.
- Points of View, 1922.
- Contemporary Personalities, 1924.
- America Revisited, 1924.
- Fourteen English Judges, 1926.
- Famous Trials of History, 1926.
- Law, Life and Letters, 1927.
- More Famous Trials, 1928.
- The Speeches of Lord Birkenhead, 1929.
- The World in 2030, 1930.
- Turning Points in History, 1930.
- Last Essays, 1930.
- (Editor) The Five Hundred Best English Letters, 1931.
- Fifty Famous Fights in Fact and Fiction, 1932.

== Cases ==
=== As counsel ===
- R v Casement [1917] 1 KB 98, prosecution of Sir Roger Casement for high treason
- R v Wheeldon & Ors [1917], prosecution of Alice Wheeldon, Winnie Mason and Alf Mason for conspiracy to murder Lloyd George and Arthur Henderson

=== As judge ===
- Viscountess Rhondda's Claim [1922] 2 AC 339, right of peeresses to sit in the House of Lords
- R v Secretary of State for Home Affairs, ex p O'Brien [1923] AC 691, legality of British policy of internment in Ireland

== Arms ==
Coat of arms of F. E. Smith, 1st Earl of Birkenhead
Crest A cubit arm couped fessways vested Gules cuffed Argent the hand Proper grasping a sword erect also Argent pommel and hilt Or. Escutcheon Ermine on a pale Gules between four cross crosslets of the second a like cross Or. Supporters Dexter a griffin Or wings per fess Or and Sable, sinister a lion Azure charged on the shoulder with a crozier Or. Motto Faber Meæ Fortunæ

Parliament of the United Kingdom
Preceded by James Henry Stock	Member of Parliament for Liverpool Walton; 1906–1918	Succeeded by Harry Chilcott
Preceded by William Rutherford	Member of Parliament for Liverpool West Derby; 1918–1919	Succeeded by Sir Reginald Hall
Legal offices
Preceded by Sir Stanley Buckmaster	Solicitor General for England and Wales; 1915	Succeeded by Sir George Cave
Preceded by Sir Edward Carson	Attorney General for England and Wales; 1915–1919	Succeeded by Sir Gordon Hewart
Political offices
Preceded by The Lord Finlay	Lord High Chancellor of Great Britain; 1919–1922	Succeeded by The Viscount Cave
Preceded by The Lord Olivier	Secretary of State for India; 1924–1928	Succeeded by The Viscount Peel
Academic offices
Preceded by Bonar Law	Rector of the University of Glasgow; 1922–1925	Succeeded by Austen Chamberlain
Preceded by Viscount Cecil of Chelwood	Rector of the University of Aberdeen; 1927–1930	Succeeded by Arthur Keith
Peerage of the United Kingdom
New creation	Earl of Birkenhead and Viscount Furneaux; 1922–1930	Succeeded by Frederick Winston Furneaux Smith
New creation	Viscount Birkenhead; 1921–1930	Succeeded by Frederick Winston Furneaux Smith
New creation	Baron Birkenhead; 1919–1930	Succeeded by Frederick Winston Furneaux Smith
Baronetage of the United Kingdom
New creation	Baronet (of Hillbrook); 1911–1930	Succeeded by Frederick Winston Furneaux Smith
Awards and achievements
Preceded by Samuel George Blythe	Cover of Time magazine 20 August 1923	Succeeded by Frederick G. Banting
