= Prothero =

Prothero is a surname of Welsh origin (from ap Rhydderch) and may refer to:

- Ada Chesterton (1869–1962), British journalist who wrote under the pseudonym John Keith Prothero
- Donald Prothero (born 1954), American paleontologist and author
- George Walter Prothero (1848–1922), English writer and historian
- Lewis Prothero, fictional character from V for Vendetta
- Mark Prothero, American attorney
- Mr, Miss, and Mrs Prothero, fictional characters in A Child's Christmas in Wales by Dylan Thomas
- Rowland Prothero, 1st Baron Ernle (1851–1937), British agricultural expert, administrator, journalist, author, and Conservative politician
- Stephen Prothero, Boston University professor and author
- Thomas Prothero (1780–1853), Welsh lawyer (etc.)
- Brian Protheroe (born 1944), British musician and actor
- Cynbe ru Taren (a.k.a. Jeffrey Prothero), American computer programmer
- Mark Protheroe (born 1971), Australian rugby league player
