= George Prothero (cricketer) =

Welsh cricketer and clergyman

Personal information
- Full name: George Prothero
- Born: 18 March 1818; Newport, Monmouthshire, Wales
- Died: 16 November 1894 (aged 76); Whippingham, Isle of Wight, England
- Batting: Unknown
- Relatives: Rowland Prothero (son)

Domestic team information
- Years: Team
- 1862: Oxford University

Career statistics
Competition	First-class
Matches	1
Runs scored	3
Batting average	1.50
100s/50s	–/–
Top score	3
Catches/stumpings	–/–
- Source: Cricinfo, 18 March 2020

George Prothero (18 March 1818 – 16 November 1894) was a Welsh first-class cricketer and clergyman.

The son of Thomas Prothero, he was born in March 1818 at Newport. He was educated at Harrow School, matriculating at Wadham College, Oxford in 1838, and graduating B.A. in 1843. While studying at Oxford, he made a single appearance in first-class cricket for Oxford University against the Marylebone Cricket Club at Lord's in 1839. Batting twice in the match, he was dismissed for 3 runs by Henry Walker in the Oxford first-innings, while in their second-innings he was dismissed without scoring by John Bayley.

After graduating from Oxford, Prothero took holy orders in the Church of England. His first ecclesiastical post was as vicar of Clifton upon Teme in Worcestershire from 1847 to 1853, before moving to Whippingham on the Isle of Wight, where he was rector from 1857. He was made a Canon of Westminster in 1869 and was a Chaplain-in-Ordinary to Queen Victoria. Prothero died at Whippingham in November 1894. He had married Emma Money-Kyrle in June 1846, with the couple having five children. These included the politician and cricketer Rowland Prothero, the historian George Prothero, and the Royal Navy admiral Arthur William Edward Prothero.
