= Sir John Mowbray, 1st Baronet =

British Conservative politician

The Right Honourable Sir John Mowbray Bt
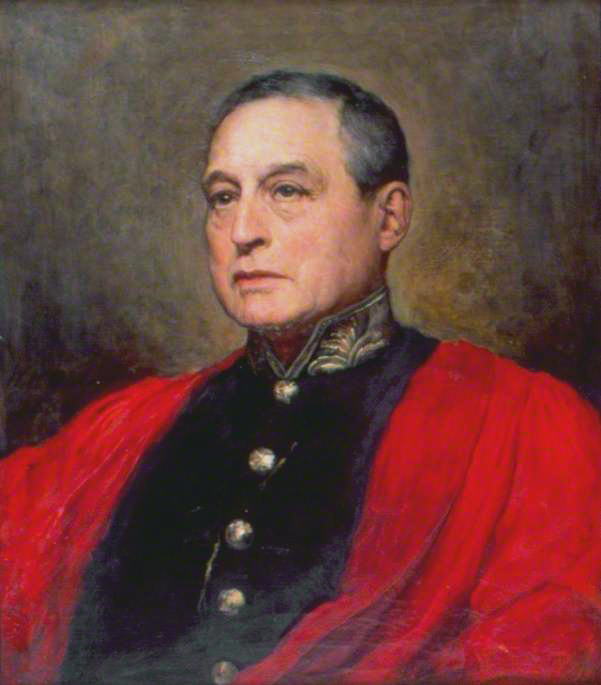
- John Robert Mowbray (Walter William Ouless, 1886)

Father of the House of Commons
- In office 1898–1899
- Preceded by: Charles Pelham Villiers
- Succeeded by: William Wither Bramston Beach

Personal details
- Born: John Robert Cornish; 3 June 1815
- Died: 22 April 1899 (aged 83)
- Occupation: Member of Parliament
- Known for: Father of the House

Sir John Robert Mowbray, 1st Baronet PC (3 June 1815 – 22 April 1899), known as John Cornish until 1847, was a British Conservative politician and long-serving Member of Parliament, eventually serving as Father of the House.

== Family and education ==
Mowbray was the son of Robert Stirling Cornish and was educated at Westminster School and Christ Church, Oxford.

In 1847 he married Elizabeth Mowbray, the sole heiress of George Isaac Mowbray of Bishopwearmouth. The same year he assumed by royal licence the surname Mowbray in lieu of his patronymic to reflect the large fortune into which he married. They had three sons, all of whom succeeded to their father's baronetcy, and two daughters:

- Annie Maud Mowbray (died 29 Oct 1926), who married the Rev. Charles Thomas Cruttwell, canon residentiary of Peterborough
- Edith Marian Mowbray (died 27 March 1933), unmarried
- Sir Robert Gray Cornish Mowbray, 2nd Baronet (21 May 1850 – 23 July 1916)
- Sir Reginald Ambrose Mowbray, 3rd Baronet (5 April 1852 – 30 December 1916)
- Rev. Sir Edmund George Lionel Mowbray, 4th Baronet (26 June 1859 – 2 February 1919)

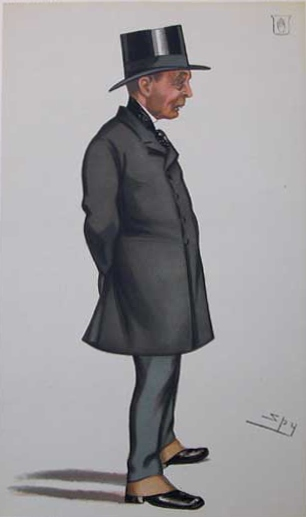
"Committee of Selection" Mowbray as caricatured by Spy (Leslie Ward) in Vanity Fair, April 1882

== Career ==
In 1853 Mowbray was elected to the House of Commons for Durham, a seat he held until 1868, and then represented Oxford University from 1868 until his death in 1899. In the House, he was chair of the Committee of Selection and of the Standing Orders Committee. He served as Judge Advocate General under the Earl of Derby from 1858 to 1859, and under Derby and later Benjamin Disraeli from 1866 to 1868. He was admitted to the Privy Council in 1858 and in 1880 he was created a baronet. From 1898 until his death the following year Mowbray was Father of the House of Commons.

A bronze bust was erected as a memorial in the House of Commons in 1900.

== Sources ==
- A. F. Pollard; rev. H. C. G. Matthew (2004). "Mowbray, Sir John Robert, first baronet (1815–1899)". Oxford Dictionary of National Biography (online ed.). Oxford University Press. doi:10.1093/ref:odnb/19456. (Subscription, Wikipedia Library access or UK public library membership required.)
- Pollard, Albert Frederick (1901). "Mowbray, John Robert" . In Lee, Sidney (ed.). Dictionary of National Biography (1st supplement). London: Smith, Elder & Co.

Parliament of the United Kingdom
Preceded by Sir William Atherton; Lord Adolphus Vane	Member of Parliament for Durham City; 1853–1868; With: Sir William Atherton 1853–1864; John Henderson 1864–1868	Succeeded by John Henderson; John Robert Davison
Preceded by Sir William Heathcote; Gathorne Hardy	Member of Parliament for Oxford University; 1868–1899; With: Gathorne Hardy 1868–1878; John Gilbert Talbot 1878–1899	Succeeded by Sir William Anson; Lord Hugh Cecil
Preceded by Charles Pelham Villiers	Father of the House of Commons; 1898–1899	Succeeded by Bramston Beach
Preceded by Charles Pelham Villiers	Oldest Member of Parliament; 1898–1899	Succeeded by Spencer Charrington?
Political offices
Preceded by Charles Pelham Villiers	Judge Advocate General; 1858–1859	Succeeded by Thomas Emerson Headlam
Preceded by Thomas Emerson Headlam	Judge Advocate General; 1866–1868	Succeeded by Sir Colman O'Loghlen
Church of England titles
Preceded by Henry Austin Bruce	Second Church Estates Commissioner; 1866–1868	Succeeded by Sir Thomas Dyke Acland
Preceded by Edward Howes	Third Church Estates Commissioner; 1871–1892	Succeeded by Sir Michael Hicks Beach
Baronetage of the United Kingdom
New creation	Baronet (of Warennes Wood); 1880–1899	Succeeded by Robert Mowbray
