= Dolben baronets =

Extinct baronetcy in the Baronetage of England

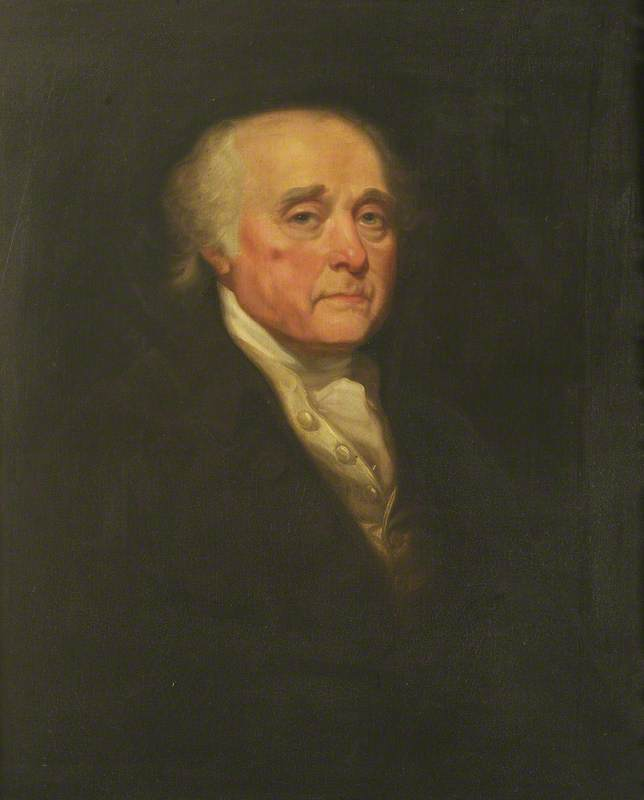
A c. 1802 portrait of Sir William Dolben, 3rd Baronet by Mather Brown

The Dolben Baronetcy, of Finedon in the County of Northamptonshire, was a title in the Baronetage of England. It was created on 1 April 1704 for Gilbert Dolben, son of John Dolben, Archbishop of York. Gilbert was judge of the Court of Common Pleas (Ireland) and MP for Ripon, Peterborough and Yarmouth, Isle of Wight. The 3rd Baronet was an MP for Oxford University and Northamptonshire, and was an avid campaigner for abolition of the slave trade. The title became extinct on the death of Sir John English Dolben, the 4th Baronet, in 1837. William Harcourt Isham Mackworth (1806–1872), a younger son of Sir Digby Mackworth, the 3rd Baronet, took the additional surname Dolben after he married Frances, the heiress of the 4th Baronet.

The family seat was Finedon Hall, in Finedon, Northamptonshire. It has now been converted into flats.

== Dolben baronets, of Finedon (1704) ==
Escutcheon of the Dolben Baronets of Findon

- Sir Gilbert Dolben, 1st Baronet (1658–1722)
- Sir John Dolben, 2nd Baronet (1684–1756)
- Sir William Dolben, 3rd Baronet (1727–1814)
- Sir John English Dolben, 4th Baronet (c. 1750–1837). Baronetcy extinct on his death, his son Colonel William Somerset Dolben having predeceased him without male issue.
