= George Talbot (judge) =

English barrister and High Court judge (1861–1938)

The Right Honourable Sir George Talbot
- Portrait by Walter Stoneman, 1926

Justice of the High Court
- In office 14 November 1923 – 1 June 1937

Personal details
- Born: 19 June 1861 London, England
- Died: 11 July 1938 (aged 77) Edenbridge, Kent, England

Sir George John Talbot, PC (19 June 1861 – 11 July 1938) was an English barrister and High Court judge.

== Early life and background ==
Talbot was born in London in 1861, the eldest son of John Gilbert Talbot, Conservative Member of Parliament for West Kent and for Oxford University, and of The Hon Meriel Sarah Talbot, née Lyttelton, eldest daughter of George Lyttelton, 4th Baron Lyttelton. Through his mother he was related to several prominent members of the Lyttelton family, such as Alfred Lyttelton, Arthur Lyttelton, and George William Spencer Lyttelton. Through his father he was the nephew of Edward Talbot, Bishop of Winchester.

Talbot's father was educated at Charterhouse, but his disapproval of the migration of that school to Godalming caused him in 1873 to send his son to Winchester College. In 1880 Talbot gained a junior studentship at Christ Church, Oxford, where he obtained first-class honours in classical moderations (1882) and in literae humaniores (1884). In 1886 was elected to a prize fellowship at All Souls College, Oxford.

A career in the Church or at the bar was obvious for Talbot. On his father's side he was sixth in descent from Lord Chancellor Talbot, while on his mother's side he was thirteenth in descent from Sir Thomas Littleton, judge of the Common Pleas, and ninth in descent from Lord Chancellor Bromley. His grandfather, John Chetwynd Talbot (a son of Charles Chetwynd-Talbot, 2nd Earl Talbot), whose law library he inherited, had a highly successful career at the parliamentary bar in its busiest days of railway promotions. As all these ancestors were members of the Inner Temple Talbot followed them, and was there called to the bar in 1887. He took silk in 1906, became a bencher of his Inn in 1914, and was its treasurer in 1936.

Until late in his career at the bar his busy practice was mainly before parliamentary committees, and in work of a like character, such as in the Railway and Canal Commission. He was also a learned ecclesiastical lawyer, and was eventually chancellor of six dioceses. He was counsel to the University of Oxford from 1915 to 1923. During the latter part of his career he increasingly appeared before the House of Lords and the Judicial Committee of the Privy Council. Among his prominent appearances were Bowman v Secular Society and Viscountess Rhondda's Claim in the Committee of Privileges of the House of Lords. Of the latter case, Lord Greene, future Master of the Rolls, thought that Talbot's argument, before a troublesome and divided tribunal, was the finest effort of advocacy which he ever heard.

In October 1916 Lord Buckmaster, considering Talbot for a vacant judgeship in the King's Bench Division, consulted the Prime Minister, H. H. Asquith, who dissuaded him (to Buckmaster's subsequent regret) on the ground that promotion from the parliamentary bar would not be popular with the profession, and Henry McCardie was appointed instead. In the opinion of Sir Frank Douglas MacKinnon If Talbot had been appointed then, his judicial career would probably have ended in the House of Lords.

== Judicial career ==
In November 1923, on the retirement of Mr Justice Darling, Lord Cave recommended Talbot's appointment as a Justice of the King's Bench Division of the High Court, and he was given the customary knighthood in 1924. On the bench he displayed every quality of the ideal judge. He had learning, dignity, industry, patience, and courtesy; his decisions were almost invariably right, and on most occasions were thought to be so by the Court of Appeal. And (although he tried at least one sensational murder case) his name was unknown to the readers of the popular newspapers. Following his appointment to sit in the Commercial Court, he started there with a protest against one with so little experience of that class of work being selected. That, however, was the fault of a very needless modesty—he did the work as well as he did everything else. In criminal trials on circuit, of which he had had little experience at the bar, he had no contemporary superior.

Towards the end of 1936 Talbot's powers, both physical and mental, began to fail. In June 1937 he resigned, and thereupon was sworn of the Privy Council. His resignation would probably have taken place earlier if he had not waited to be present at Winchester, on 29 May, when seven Wykehamist judges were received ad portas. Winchester College was, next to his wife and family, Talbot's greatest object of devotion. He was a fellow from 1930 until he resigned shortly before his death, and for a time was sub-warden. In 1935 he was elected an honorary student of Christ Church, and he served for thirty-five years on the council of Keble College, Oxford.

Talbot died on 11 July 1938 at Falconhurst, near Edenbridge, Kent, the pleasant estate created by his grandfather, and was buried at Markbeech near by. His wife survived him. Their elder son predeceased him in 1922; the younger son followed his father to the Inner Temple and the bar.

His legal publications included Modern Decisions on Ritual (1934) and Law and Practice of Licensing (1896 and 1905).
