= Thomas Prothero =

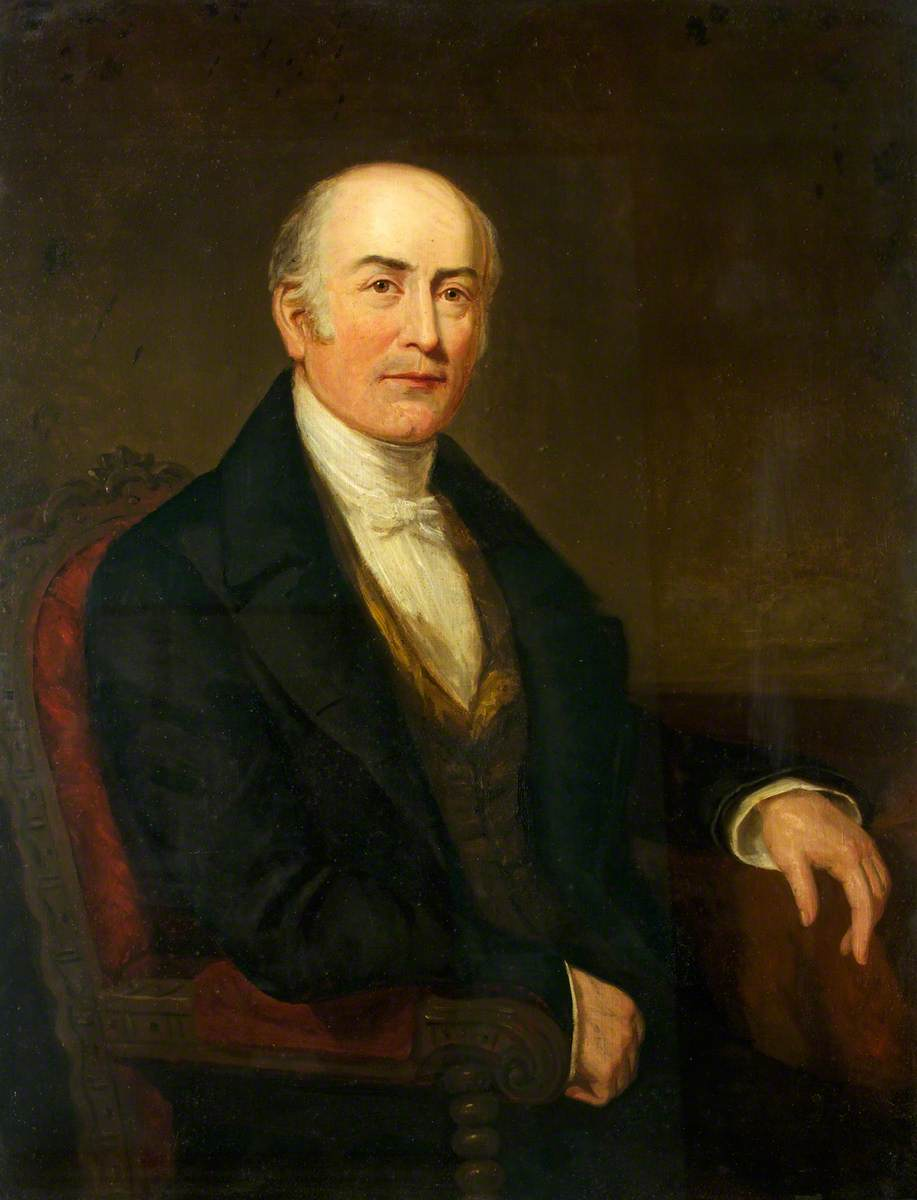
Prothero in later life. Date and author unknown.

Thomas Prothero (or Protheroe) (1780–1853) was a Welsh lawyer, mine owner and businessman, known as an opponent of John Frost.

== Life ==
He was born in Usk, the son of Thomas Prothero, a lawyer who was involved also in local politics in Usk and the Beaufort estate. The supposition that he was illegitimate, based on his birthplace in the 1851 census for Malpas being entered simply as "Monmouthshire", is doubtful, given that the enumerator completed all entries in the same way.

=== Law and local politics ===
The younger Thomas Prothero began life in the same directions as his father. He set up in business in Newport, Monmouthshire; and he became town clerk of Newport in 1807. He was later joined in his law firm by Thomas Phillips, who became another influential local figure; they were in partnership from 1824 to 1840. Prothero and his law firm were drawn into the electoral politics of the two local constituencies, Monmouthshire and Monmouth Boroughs.

=== Land and political agent ===
He worked as agent for Sir Charles Morgan, 2nd Baronet M.P., both in politics and in management of the Tredegar Estate. The two were related: a local comment was that the antipathy Morgan's son Charles Morgan Robinson Morgan felt for Prothero was unjustified, because the younger Morgan was intending to stand for Parliament at Brecon, and Prothero's rent-gathering tactics in Monmouthshire would not matter there.

Together Prothero, Sir Charles Morgan and allies got the 1826 Newport Improvement Act through Parliament. It set up the Newport Improvement Commission, which took on a number of local government functions until it was wound up in 1850; its effectiveness in the public health area was limited. Its successor was the Newport Board of Health.

=== Moderate reform politics ===
Prothero and Morgan parted company in 1831, Prothero modifying a largely conservative political position to support a measure of political reform in the run-up to the Great Reform Bill of 1832. He remained on good terms with William Addams Williams, Monmouthshire MP from 1831 to 1841, who was a reform candidate; and in Monmouth Boroughs Benjamin Hall was elected in 1831 with the backing of Phillips and Prothero.

=== Feud with Frost ===
A personal feud that developed between Prothero and tradesman John Frost coloured local affairs in Monmouthshire for two decades. As this conflict progressed, Prothero became an opponent of further reforms, and an opponent of Chartism. In the end he was an alarmist. His view that some Chartists in 1839 were intent on destroying the local gentry was, however, based on evidence of what some extremists were urging.

The roots of the conflict were in a family quarrel, and the consequences of the will of William Foster; Frost was left with a debt to pay, in his view unfairly. Legal action for libel against Prothero led to Frost spending time in jail from 1822. Subsequently, both Sir Charles Morgan and Prothero were attacked in pamphlets by Frost. As part of his campaign, Frost also petitioned Parliament at the time of the 1826 Newport Improvement Bill; it passed against Frost's attacks, with the Morgan and Beaufort influence behind it.

The feud flared up again after Frost became mayor of Newport in 1837. He accused Prothero of appropriating harbour dues; and again attacked Sir Charles Morgan. His stepson William Foster Geach was dragged into the conflict, accused by Prothero and Phillips of professional misconduct. Prothero gave evidence at the 1839 Monmouth treason trial, sworn under voir dire.

=== Malpas Court ===
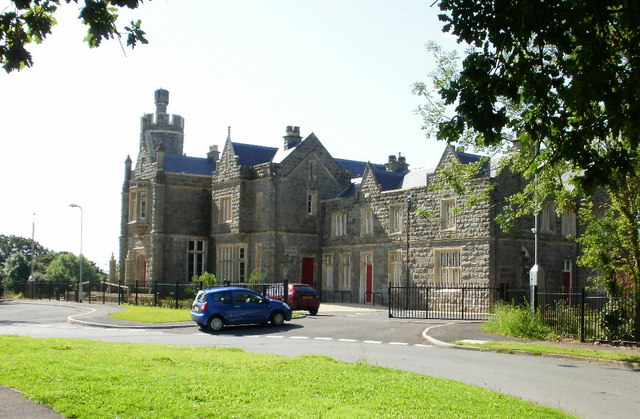
Malpas Court, Newport.

Prothero had built between 1835 and 1838 Malpas Court, a large house in grounds on the edge of Newport. The architect was Thomas Henry Wyatt. The house was in the Prothero family until 1916. It is now a Grade II listed building; it was in a poor state of repair for many years.

=== Mine owner ===
From the early 1820s Prothero developed business interests in the coal mining area of north-west Monmouthshire, on the eastern edge of the South Wales Coalfield. His holdings came to include Butter Hatch Colliery, Libanus Colliery, Church Farm Colliery, New Place Pig, Plas and Place collieries. By 1830 Prothero was announcing the use of a steam locomotive on the tramway run by the Monmouthshire Canal Company; there was a newspaper report of the delivery of a locomotive for Blancyffin Isha Colliery in June of that year. It was the Speedwell, built by Neath Abbey Foundry.

With Thomas Powell, Powell leased the coal under Plas Bedwellty in 1823, from John Hodder Moggridge. This area was to the west, on the Glamorgan side of the Rhymney Valley. As was the case for the unscrupulous Powell, Prothero trespassed in mining under the Tredegar estate, in his case from the Woodfield colliery. Powell and Prothero were involved together in a long series of deals in partnership, in which shares in pits often changed hands. In the 1830s Prothero was one of a small group trying to achieve a local cartel or "coal ring", the precise details differing in sources. According to one source, in 1837, with Powell and Joseph Latch, he helped set up the Newport Coal Company, an attempt to control coal prices in Monmouthshire. In another, it was in 1833 (Newport Coal Association), with John Latch.

Woodfield Colliery and Place Level Colliery were included in an 1842 report for the Children's Employment Commission by Robert Hugh Franks, detailing evidence of the use of child labour.

== Family ==
Prothero married Mary Collins, who died in 1835; they had nine children. His second marriage was to Sarah Pattman. Prothero's son George was father to George Walter Prothero, Arthur William Edward Prothero and Rowland Edmund Prothero.
