= Charles Oman =

British military historian (1860–1946)

Sir Charles Oman KBE, FBA
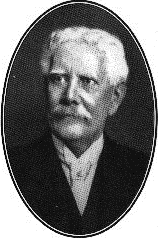
- Oman in 1940
- Born: 12 January 1860; Muzaffarpur district, India
- Died: 23 June 1946 (aged 86); Oxford, United Kingdom
- Education: New College, Oxford
- Occupation: Historian

Sir Charles William Chadwick Oman, KBE, FBA (12 January 1860 – 23 June 1946) was a British military historian. His reconstructions of medieval battles from the fragmentary and distorted accounts left by chroniclers were pioneering.

== Early life ==
Oman was born in Muzaffarpur district, in the Bihar Province of British India, the only child of a British planter, Charles Philip Austin Oman, and his wife Anne Chadwick. He was educated at Winchester College and New College, Oxford, where he studied under William Stubbs.

In 1884, he was invited to become a founding member of the Stubbs Society, which was under Stubbs's patronage.

== Career ==
In 1881, Oman was elected to a Prize Fellowship at All Souls College, where he remained for the rest of his academic career, later becoming also Librarian of his college. In October 1900, due to the increasing deafness of the Chichele Professor of Modern History at Oxford, Montagu Burrows, Oman was appointed as his Deputy, to take over the active duties of the role for a stipend of £500 a year. Burrows continued to hold the chair until his death in 1905, when Oman succeeded him. Oman was also elected a Fellow of the British Academy and later served as president of the Royal Historical Society (1917–1921), the Numismatic Society and the Royal Archaeological Institute.

Among his teaching activities at Oxford, with C. T. Atkinson of Exeter College he taught a special subject in military history focussing on the Peninsular War.

Oman's academic career was interrupted by the First World War, during which he was employed by the government's Press Bureau and the Foreign Office.

Oman was the Conservative Member of Parliament for the University of Oxford constituency from 1919 to 1935, and was knighted KBE in the 1920 civilian war honours list.

The parody history book 1066 and All That, published in 1930, includes the dedication "Absit Oman", a distortion of the Latin phrase "Absit omen". It can be translated as "may Oman be absent", reflecting the prominence of Oman among English historians at the time.

== Honours ==
He became an honorary fellow of New College in 1936, and received the honorary degrees of DCL (Oxford, 1926) and LL.D (Edinburgh, 1911 and Cambridge, 1927). He was awarded the Medal of the Royal Numismatic Society in 1928. He died at Oxford aged 86.

== Personal life ==
In 1892, Oman married Mary, a daughter of General Sir Robert Maclagan, Royal Engineers, and a niece of William Maclagan, Archbishop of York. They had one son and two daughters.

Two of Oman's children became authors. His daughter Carola Oman CBE was a writer of history, biography, and fiction for adults and children, including a retelling of the Robin Hood legend and biographies of Admiral Lord Nelson and Lieutenant-General Sir John Moore. His son Charles C. Oman wrote several volumes on British silver and other household objects and worked as a Keeper of the Department of Metalwork in the Victoria and Albert Museum. He was an active member of the Folklore Society and was the father of Julia Trevelyan Oman.

== Works ==
=== 1880s ===
- The Art of War in the Middle Ages (1885)
- "The Anglo-Norman and Angevin Administrative System (1100–1265)", in Essays Introductory to the Study of English Constitutional History (1887)
- A History of Greece From the Earliest Times to the Death of Alexander the Great (1888; 7th ed., 1900; 8th ed., rev., 1905)

=== 1890s ===
- Warwick the Kingmaker (1891)
- The Byzantine Empire (1892)
- The Dark Ages 476–918, Period I of Periods of European History (1893; 5th ed. 1905)
- A History of England (1895; 2nd ed. 1919)
- A History of the Art of War: the Middle Ages from the Fourth to the Fourteenth Century (1898)
- England and the Hundred Years War, 1327–1485 A.D. (1898), No. III of The Oxford Manuals of English History, Charles Oman, ed.
- "Alfred as a Warrior", in Alfred The Great, Alfred Bowker, ed. (1899)
- Reign of George VI, 1900-1925. A Forecast Written in the Year 1763 (preface and notes) (1763; republished 1899)

=== 1900s ===
- England in the Nineteenth Century (1900)
- A History of the Peninsular War, Vol. I: 1807–1809 (1902)
- Seven Roman Statesmen of the Later Roman Republic (1902)
- A History of the Peninsular War, Vol. II: Jan. 1809-Sep. 1809 (1903)
- "The Peninsular War, 1808–14", in The Cambridge Modern History, Vol. IX, Napoleon (1906)
- "The Hundred Days, 1815", in The Cambridge Modern History, Vol. IX, Napoleon (1906)
- "Inaugural lecture on the study of history" (1906), in Oxford Lectures on University Studies, 1906–1921 (1924)
- The Great Revolt of 1381 (1906) (See The Great Revolt of 1381.)
- The History of England from the Accession of Richard II. to the Death of Richard III. (1377–1485), Vol. IV of The Political History of England (1906), William Hunt & Reginald Poole, ed.
- A History of the Peninsular War, Vol. III: Sep. 1809 – Dec. 1810 (1908)

=== 1910s ===
- A History of England Before the Norman Conquest (1910; 8th ed. 1937), Vol. I of A History of England in Seven Volumes (1904–), Charles Oman, ed.
- A History of the Peninsular War, Vol. IV: Dec. 1810 – Dec. 1811 (1911)
- Wellington's Army, 1809–1814 (1912)
- A History of the Peninsular War, Vol. V: Oct. 1811 – Aug. 1812 (1914)
- The Outbreak of the War of 1914–18: A Narrative Based Mainly on British Official Documents (1919)

=== 1920s ===
- A History of the Peninsular War, Vol. VI: Sep. 1812 – Aug. 1813 (1922)
- The Unfortunate Colonel Despard & Other Studies (1922)
- A History of the Art of War in the Middle Ages, 2 vols: I: A.D. 378–1278; II: A.D. 1278–1485 (2nd ed. 1924) – much expanded from 1898 edition.
- Castles (1926)
- "The Duke of Wellington", in Political Principles of Some Notable Prime Ministers of the Nineteenth Century, Fossey John Cobb Hearnshaw, ed. (1926)
- Studies in the Napoleonic Wars (1929)

=== 1930s ===
- A History of the Peninsular War, Vol. VII: Aug. 1813 – Apr. 1814 (1930)
- The Coinage of England (1931)
- Things I Have Seen (1933)
- "The Necessity for the Reformation" (1933) (public lecture)
- A History of the Art of War in the Sixteenth Century (1937)
- The Sixteenth century (1937)
- On the Writing of History (1939)

=== 1940s ===
- Memories of Victorian Oxford and of Some Early Years (1941)
- The Lyons Mail (1945)

Parliament of the United Kingdom
Preceded by Lord Hugh Cecil; Rowland Prothero	Member of Parliament for Oxford University; 1919 – 1935; With: Lord Hugh Cecil	Succeeded by Lord Hugh Cecil; A. P. Herbert
Academic offices
Preceded by Charles Harding Firth	President of the Royal Historical Society; 1917–1921	Succeeded by John William Fortescue
