= 1878 Oxford University by-election =

UK Parliamentary by-election

The 1878 Oxford University by-election was fought on 13–17 May 1878. The by-election was fought due to the elevation to the peerage of the incumbent Conservative MP, Gathorne Hardy. It was won by the Conservative candidate John Gilbert Talbot.

1878 Oxford University by-election
Party	Candidate	Votes	%	±%
Conservative	John Gilbert Talbot	2,687	73.1	N/A
Liberal	Henry John Stephen Smith	989	26.9	New
Majority		1,698	46.2	N/A
Turnout		3,676	73.1	N/A
Registered electors		5,026		
Conservative hold		Swing	N/A	
