= Quarterly Review =

British literary and political periodical

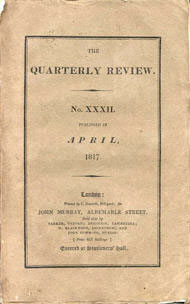
- First issue: March 1809
- Final issue: 1967
- Company: John Murray II
- Country: United Kingdom
- Language: English

The Quarterly Review was a literary and political periodical founded in March 1809 by London publishing house John Murray. It ceased publication in 1967. It was referred to as The London Quarterly Review, as reprinted by Leonard Scott, for an American edition.

== Early years ==
Initially, the Quarterly was set up primarily to counter the influence on public opinion of the Edinburgh Review. Its first editor, William Gifford, was appointed by George Canning, at the time Foreign Secretary, later Prime Minister.

Early contributors included Secretaries of the Admiralty John Wilson Croker and Sir John Barrow, Poet Laureate Robert Southey, poet-novelist Sir Walter Scott, Italian exile Ugo Foscolo, Gothic novelist Charles Robert Maturin, and the essayist Charles Lamb.

Under Gifford, the journal took the Canningite liberal-conservative position on matters of domestic and foreign policy, if only inconsistently. It opposed major political reforms, but it supported the gradual abolition of slavery, moderate law reform, humanitarian treatment of criminals and the insane, and the liberalizing of trade. In a series of articles in its pages, Southey advocated a progressive philosophy of social reform. Because two of his key writers, Scott and Southey, were opposed to Catholic emancipation, Gifford did not permit the journal to take a clear position on that issue.

Reflecting divisions in the Conservative party itself, under its third editor, John Gibson Lockhart, the Quarterly became less consistent in its political philosophy. While Croker continued to represent the Canningites and Peelites, the party's liberal wing, it also found a place for the more extremely conservative views of Lords Eldon and Wellington.

During its early years, reviews of new works were sometimes remarkably long. That of Henry Koster's Travels in Brazil (1816) ran to forty-three pages.

== Controversial reviews ==
Typical of early nineteenth-century journals, reviewing in the Quarterly was highly politicized and on occasion excessively dismissive. Writers and publishers known for their Unitarian or radical views were among the early journal's main targets. Prominent victims of scathing reviews included Irish novelist Lady Morgan (Sydney Owenson), English poet and essayist Walter Savage Landor, as well as English novelist Mary Wollstonecraft Shelley and her husband Percy Bysshe Shelley.

In an 1817 article, John Wilson Croker attacked John Keats in a review of Endymion for his association with Leigh Hunt and the so-called Cockney School of poetry. Shelley blamed Croker's article for bringing about the death of the seriously ill poet, 'snuffed out', in Byron's ironic phrase, 'by an article'.

In 1816, Sir Walter Scott reviewed his own, but anonymously published, Tales of My Landlord, partly to deflect suspicion that he was the author; he proved one of the book's harshest critics. Scott was also the author of a favourable review of Jane Austen's Emma.

== Nineteenth-century editors ==
- William Gifford (February 1809 – December 1824. Vol. 1, Number 1 – Vol. 31, Number 61)
- John Taylor Coleridge (March 1825 – December 1825. Vol. 31, Number 62 – Vol. 33, Number 65)
- John Gibson Lockhart (March 1826 – June 1853. Vol. 33, Number 66 – Vol. 93, Number 185)
- Whitwell Elwin (September 1853 – July 1860. Vol. 93, Number 186 – Vol. 108, Number 215)
- William Macpherson (October 1860 – January 1867. Vol. 108, Number 216 – Vol. 122, Number 243)
- William Smith (April 1867 – July 1893, Vol. 122, Number 244 – Vol. 177, Number 353)
- John Murray IV (October 1893 – January 1894. Vol. 177, Number 354 – Vol. 178, Number 355)
- Rowland Edmund Prothero (April 1894 – January 1899. Vol. 178, Number 356 – Vol. 189, Number 377)
- George Walter Prothero (April 1899 – October 1900. Vol. 189, Number 378 – Vol. 192, Number 384)
