= John Mylles =

English politician

John Mylles (c. 1604 – March 1676) was an English politician who sat in the House of Commons in 1659 and 1660.

Mylles was active in the parliamentary cause and was judge advocate for the army. Under the proceedings of the committee for the reformation of Oxford University, he was appointed prebendary of Christ Church, Oxford sometime between 1648 and 1650. He was removed from the position soon after as he had not taken engagement. He was re-instated as prebendary in or before 1659.

In 1659, Mylles was elected Member of Parliament for Oxford University in the Third Protectorate Parliament. He was re-elected MP for Oxford University in the Convention Parliament in 1660.

Parliament of England
Preceded by Nathaniel Fiennes	Member of Parliament for Oxford University; 1659; With: Matthew Hale	Succeeded by Not represented in restored Rump
