= Hughligans =

1900s faction of the UK Conservative Party

The Hughligans were a faction of the British Conservative Party in the early 20th century.

The name is a pun on the word hooligan and "Hugh", as in Lord Hugh Cecil (later Lord Quickswood), one of the faction's leaders. The Hughligans were a group of backbench Conservative MPs who were dissatisfied with the leadership of Arthur Balfour. Cecil was a younger son of Balfour's predecessor as Conservative Leader, the Marquess of Salisbury. Besides Cecil, other members were F.E. Smith, Earl Percy, Arthur Stanley, Ian Malcolm and Lord George Hamilton. Winston Churchill was also associated with the group before his departure from the Conservative Party in 1904.

In Randolph Churchill's biography of his father Winston, he commented: "Later they were on occasion to be outrageous in their Parliamentary manners and the critics dubbed them the Hughligans, or Hooligans."

After the fall of the Conservative government in 1905, the surviving Hughligans became bitter opponents of Balfour, whom they considered insufficiently militant in opposition to the Liberal government of H. H. Asquith. The Hughligans are best known for an incident in July 1911, during the conflict over reform of the House of Lords, when Cecil and Smith led an organised disruption of the House of Commons, preventing Asquith from speaking for half an hour while he stood in silence at the dispatch box. The incident deeply embarrassed Balfour, and hastened his retirement as party leader, which was Cecil's intention.
