= Oxford University (constituency) =

Parliamentary constituency in the United Kingdom, 1801–1950

- Former university constituency for the House of Commons

1603–1950
- Seats: 2

Oxford University was a university constituency electing two members to the English House of Commons from 1603 and from 1707 British House of Commons to 1950. The last two members to represent Oxford University when it was abolished were A. P. Herbert and Arthur Salter.

== Boundaries, electorate and electoral system ==
This university constituency was created by a Royal Charter of 1603. It was abolished in 1950 by the Representation of the People Act 1948.

The constituency was not a physical area. Its electorate consisted of the graduates of the University of Oxford. Before 1918 the franchise was restricted to male graduates with a Doctorate or MA degree. Namier and Brooke estimated the number of electors as about 500 in the 1754–1790 period; by 1910, it had risen to 6,500. Following the reforms of 1918, the franchise encompassed all graduates who paid a fee of £1 to join the register. This included around 400 women who had passed examinations which would have entitled them to a degree if they were male.

The constituency returned two Members of Parliament. From 1918, the MPs were elected by the single transferable vote method of proportional representation.

== History ==
The university strongly supported the old Tory cause in the 18th century. The original party system endured long after it had become meaningless in almost every other constituency.

After the Hanoverian succession to the British throne the Whigs became dominant in the politics of Cambridge University, the other university represented in Parliament, by using a royal prerogative power to confer doctorates. That power did not exist at Oxford, so the major part of the university electorate remained Tory (and in the first half of the 18th century sometimes Jacobite) in sympathy.

The university also valued its independence from government. In a rare contested general election in 1768 the two candidates with administration ties were defeated.

In the 19th century the university continued to support the right, almost always returning Tory, Conservative or Liberal Unionist candidates. The only exception was William Ewart Gladstone, formerly "the rising hope of the stern unbending Tories". He first represented the university as a Peelite, supporting a former member for the constituency – the sometime Conservative Prime Minister Sir Robert Peel. Gladstone retained his seat as a Liberal, for a time after 1859. Following Gladstone's defeat, in 1865, subsequent Liberal candidates were rare and they were never successful in winning a seat.

Even after the introduction of proportional representation, in 1918, both members continued to be Conservatives until 1935. Independent members were elected in the last phase of university elections to Parliament, before the constituency was abolished in 1950.

== Members of Parliament ==
Sir William Whitelock is named by Rayment as "Sir William Whitelocke" and by Sedgwick as "Sir William Whitlock".

The Roman numerals in brackets after the names of the two members called William Bromley (who were father and son) are included to distinguish them. It is not a method which would have been used by the men themselves.

- Constituency created (1603)

=== Parliament of England 1604–1707 ===
As there were sometimes significant gaps between Parliaments held in this period, the dates of first assembly and dissolution are given. Where the name of the member has not yet been ascertained, the entry unknown is entered in the table.

Elected	Assembled	Dissolved	First Member	Second Member
1604	19 March 1604	9 February 1611	Sir Thomas Crompton	Sir Daniel Donne or Dun
1614	5 April 1614	7 June 1614	Sir John Bennet	Sir Daniel Donne or Dun
1620 or 1621	16 January 1621	8 February 1622	Sir John Bennet	Sir Clement Edmondes
1623 or 1624	12 February 1624	27 March 1625	Sir Isaac Wake	Sir George Calvert
1625	17 May 1625	12 August 1625	Sir Thomas Edmonds	Sir John Danvers
1626	6 February 1626	15 June 1626	Sir Thomas Edmonds	Sir John Danvers
1628	17 March 1628	10 March 1629	Sir Henry Marten	Sir John Danvers
1640	13 April 1640	5 May 1640	Sir Francis Windebanke	Sir John Danvers
1640	3 November 1640	5 December 1648	John Selden	Sir Thomas Roe
1640	6 December 1648 ^{a}	20 April 1653 ^{b}	unknown	Sir Thomas Roe
1653 ^{c}	4 July 1653	12 December 1653	unrepresented in Barebones Parliament	
1654 ^{d}	3 September 1654	22 January 1655	Dr John Owen	
1656 ^{e}	17 September 1656	4 February 1658	Nathaniel Fiennes	
1658 or 1659	27 January 1659	22 April 1659	Matthew Hale	John Mylles
N/A ^{f}	7 May 1659	20 February 1660	unknown	unknown
N/A ^{f}	21 February 1660	16 March 1660	unknown	unknown
12 April 1660	25 April 1660	29 December 1660	Thomas Clayton	John Mylles
1 April 1661	8 May 1661	24 January 1679	Laurence Hyde	Sir Heneage Finch, Bt
16 January 1674	8 May 1661	24 January 1679	Laurence Hyde	Thomas Thynne
27 February 1679	6 March 1679	12 July 1679	Heneage Finch	John Eddisbury
19 August 1679	21 October 1680	18 January 1681	Sir Leoline Jenkins	Charles Perrot
1681	21 March 1681	28 March 1681	Sir Leoline Jenkins	Charles Perrot
1685	19 May 1685	2 June 1687	Sir Leoline Jenkins	Charles Perrot
23 November 1685	19 May 1685	2 June 1687	George Clarke	Charles Perrot
7 January 1689	22 January 1689	6 February 1690	Heneage Finch	Sir Thomas Clarges^{g}
1690	20 March 1690	11 October 1695	Heneage Finch	Sir Thomas Clarges^{g}
21 October 1695	22 November 1695	6 July 1698	Heneage Finch	Sir William Trumbull
23 July 1698	24 August 1698	19 December 1700	Sir Christopher Musgrave, Bt	Sir William Glynne, Bt
3 January 1701	6 February 1701	11 November 1701	Sir Christopher Musgrave, Bt	Heneage Finch
21 March 1701	6 February 1701	11 November 1701	William Bromley (I)	Heneage Finch
1701	30 December 1701	2 July 1702	William Bromley (I)	Heneage Finch
1702	20 August 1702	5 April 1705	William Bromley (I)	Heneage Finch
22 November 1703	20 August 1702	5 April 1705	William Bromley (I)	Sir William Whitelock
1705	14 June 1705	1707 ^{h}	William Bromley (I)	Sir William Whitelock

Notes:-

- ^{a} Date of Pride's Purge, which converted the Long Parliament into the Rump Parliament.
- ^{b} Date when Oliver Cromwell dissolved the Rump Parliament by force.
- ^{c} Date when the members of the nominated or Barebones Parliament were selected. The university was not represented in this body.
- ^{d} Date when the members of the First Protectorate Parliament were elected. The university was represented by one member in this body.
- ^{e} Date when the members of the Second Protectorate Parliament were elected. The university was represented by one member in this body.
- ^{f} The Rump Parliament was recalled and subsequently Pride's Purge was reversed, allowing the full Long Parliament to meet until it agreed to dissolve itself.
- ^{g} Clarges died on 4 October 1695, so the seat was vacant at the dissolution of 11 October 1695.
- ^{h} The MPs of the last Parliament of England and 45 members co-opted from the former Parliament of Scotland, became the House of Commons of the 1st Parliament of Great Britain which assembled on 23 October 1707 (see below for the members in that Parliament).

=== Parliaments of Great Britain 1707–1800 and of the United Kingdom 1801–1950 ===
Year	First member	First party	Second member	Second party
1707	Sir William Whitelock	Tory	William Bromley ^{1}	Tory
1717	George Clarke	Tory	William Bromley ^{1}	Tory
1732	George Clarke	Tory	Viscount Cornbury	Tory
1737	William Bromley (II)	Tory	Viscount Cornbury	Tory
1737	Edward Butler	Tory	Viscount Cornbury	Tory
1745	Peregrine Palmer	Tory	Viscount Cornbury	Tory
1751	Peregrine Palmer	Tory	Sir Roger Newdigate, Bt	Tory
1762	Sir Walter Bagot, Bt	Tory	Sir Roger Newdigate, Bt	Tory
1768	Sir William Dolben, Bt	Tory	Sir Roger Newdigate, Bt	Tory
1768	Francis Page	Tory	Sir Roger Newdigate, Bt	Tory
1780	Francis Page	Tory	Sir William Dolben, Bt	Tory
1801	Sir William Scott	Tory	Sir William Dolben, Bt	Tory
1806	Sir William Scott	Tory	Charles Abbot ^{2}	Tory
1817	Sir William Scott	Tory	Robert Peel	Tory
1821	Richard Heber	Tory	Robert Peel	Tory
1826	Thomas Grimston Estcourt ^{3}	Tory	Robert Peel	Tory
1829	Thomas Grimston Estcourt ^{3}	Tory	Sir Robert Inglis, Bt ^{3}	Tory
1834	Thomas Grimston Estcourt ^{3}	Conservative	Sir Robert Inglis, Bt ^{3}	Conservative
1847	William Ewart Gladstone ^{4}	Peelite	Sir Robert Inglis, Bt ^{3}	Conservative
1854	William Ewart Gladstone ^{4}	Peelite	Sir William Heathcote, Bt	Conservative
1859	William Ewart Gladstone ^{4}	Liberal	Sir William Heathcote, Bt	Conservative
1865	Gathorne Hardy	Conservative	Sir William Heathcote, Bt	Conservative
1868	Gathorne Hardy	Conservative	Sir John Mowbray, Bt	Conservative
1878	John Gilbert Talbot	Conservative	Sir John Mowbray, Bt	Conservative
1899	John Gilbert Talbot	Conservative	Sir William Anson ^{5}	Liberal Unionist
1910	Lord Hugh Cecil ^{6}	Conservative	Sir William Anson ^{5}	Liberal Unionist
1912	Lord Hugh Cecil ^{6}	Conservative	Sir William Anson ^{5}	Conservative
1914	Lord Hugh Cecil ^{6}	Conservative	Rowland Prothero	Conservative
1918	Lord Hugh Cecil ^{6}	Coalition Conservative	Rowland Prothero	Coalition Conservative
1919	Lord Hugh Cecil ^{6}	Coalition Conservative	Sir Charles Oman	Coalition Conservative
1922	Lord Hugh Cecil ^{6}	Conservative	Sir Charles Oman	Conservative
1935	Lord Hugh Cecil ^{6}	Conservative	Sir A. P. Herbert	Independent
1937	Sir Arthur Salter	Independent	Sir A. P. Herbert	Independent

- Constituency abolished (1950)

Notes:-

- ^{1} Bromley had represented the university since a by-election in March 1701. He was Speaker of the House of Commons 1710–1713.
- ^{2} Abbot was Speaker of the House of Commons 1802–1817.
- ^{3} Estcourt and Inglis are regarded as Conservative MPs from 1835, as this was the approximate date when the Tory Party became known as the Conservative Party.
- ^{4} Gladstone accepted office in a Liberal ministry in 1859, thus vacating the seat he had held (as a Peelite MP – more formally a Liberal Conservative). He was re-elected as a Liberal candidate.
- ^{5} Anson became a Conservative MP when the Liberal Unionists formally merged with the Conservatives in 1912.
- ^{6} Cecil joined the non-Coalition wing of his party at some point during the 1918–1922 Parliament.

== Elections ==
1710s – 1720s – 1730s – 1740s – 1750s – 1760s – 1770s – 1780s – 1790s – 1800s – 1810s – 1820s – 1830s – 1840s – 1850s – 1860s – 1870s – 1880s – 1890s – 1900s – 1910s – 1920s – 1930s – 1940s

=== Elections in the 1710s ===
General election 24 January 1715: Oxford University (2 seats)
Party	Candidate	Votes	%	±%
Tory	William Whitelock	Unopposed	N/A	N/A
Tory	William Bromley (I)	Unopposed	N/A	N/A

- Note (1715): Bromley had been Speaker of the House of Commons 1710-1713.
- Death of Whitelock

By-Election 4 December 1717: Oxford University
Party	Candidate	Votes	%	±%
Tory	George Clarke	Unopposed	N/A	N/A
Tory hold		Swing	N/A	

=== Elections in the 1720s ===
General election 22 March 1722: Oxford University (2 seats)
Party	Candidate	Votes	%	±%
Tory	William Bromley (I)	337	43.54	N/A
Tory	George Clarke	278	35.92	N/A
Tory	William King	159	20.54	N/A
Turnout		774	N/A	N/A

- Note (1722): Stooks Smith records the votes as Bromley 278, Clarke 213 and King 142.

General election 18 August 1727: Oxford University (2 seats)
Party	Candidate	Votes	%	±%
Tory	William Bromley (I)	Unopposed	N/A	N/A
Tory	George Clarke	Unopposed	N/A	N/A

=== Elections in the 1730s ===
- Death of Bromley

By-Election 26 February 1732: Oxford University
Party	Candidate	Votes	%	±%
Tory	Henry Hyde	Unopposed	N/A	N/A
Tory hold		Swing	N/A	

General election 26 April 1734: Oxford University (2 seats)
Party	Candidate	Votes	%	±%
Tory	Henry Hyde	Unopposed	N/A	N/A
Tory	George Clarke	Unopposed	N/A	N/A

- Death of Clarke

By-Election 9 February 1737: Oxford University
Party	Candidate	Votes	%	±%
Tory	William Bromley (II)	329	73.11	N/A
Whig	Robert Trevor	121	26.89	N/A
Majority		208	46.22	N/A
Turnout		450	N/A	N/A
Tory hold		Swing	N/A	

- Death of Bromley

By-Election 31 March 1737: Oxford University
Party	Candidate	Votes	%	±%
Tory	Edward Butler	214	76.98	N/A
Tory	Peregrine Palmer	64	23.02	N/A
Majority		150	53.96	+7.74
Turnout		278	N/A	N/A
Tory hold		Swing	N/A	

=== Elections in the 1740s ===
General election 26 April 1741: Oxford University (2 seats)
Party	Candidate	Votes	%	±%
Tory	Viscount Cornbury	Unopposed	N/A	N/A
Tory	Edward Butler	Unopposed	N/A	N/A

- Death of Butler

By-Election 12 November 1745: Oxford University
Party	Candidate	Votes	%	±%
Tory	Peregrine Palmer	Unopposed	N/A	N/A
Tory hold		Swing	N/A	

General election 27 June 1747: Oxford University (2 seats)
Party	Candidate	Votes	%	±%
Tory	Viscount Cornbury	Unopposed	N/A	N/A
Tory	Peregrine Palmer	Unopposed	N/A	N/A

=== Elections in the 1750s ===
- Summons to the House of Lords of Cornbury, by writ in acceleration for his father's subsidiary title of Lord Hyde

By-Election 31 January 1751: Oxford University
Party	Candidate	Votes	%	±%
Tory	Roger Newdigate	184	48.81	N/A
Tory	Robert Harley	126	33.42	N/A
Tory	Edward Turner	67	17.77	N/A
Majority		58	15.38	N/A
Turnout		377	N/A	N/A
Tory hold		Swing	N/A	

- Note (1751): Stooks Smith records Turner's vote as 47.

General election 15 April 1754: Oxford University (2 seats)
Party	Candidate	Votes	%	±%
Tory	Roger Newdigate	Unopposed	N/A	N/A
Tory	Peregrine Palmer	Unopposed	N/A	N/A

=== Elections in the 1760s ===
General election 27 March 1761: Oxford University (2 seats)
Party	Candidate	Votes	%	±%
Tory	Roger Newdigate	Unopposed	N/A	N/A
Tory	Peregrine Palmer	Unopposed	N/A	N/A

- Death of Palmer

By-Election 16 December 1762: Oxford University
Party	Candidate	Votes	%	±%
Tory	Walter Bagot	Unopposed	N/A	N/A
Tory hold		Swing	N/A	

- Death of Bagot

By-Election 3 February 1768: Oxford University
Party	Candidate	Votes	%	±%
Tory	William Dolben	Unopposed	N/A	N/A
Tory hold		Swing	N/A	

General election 23 March 1768: Oxford University (2 seats)
Party	Candidate	Votes	%	±%
Tory	Roger Newdigate	352	38.77	N/A
Tory	Francis Page	296	32.80	N/A
Nonpartisan	Charles Jenkinson	198	21.81	N/A
Nonpartisan	George Hay	62	6.83	N/A
Turnout		908 (493 voted)	N/A	N/A

=== Elections in the 1770s ===
General election 11 October 1774: Oxford University (2 seats)
Party	Candidate	Votes	%	±%
Tory	Roger Newdigate	Unopposed	N/A	N/A
Tory	Francis Page	Unopposed	N/A	N/A

=== Elections in the 1780s ===
General election 11 September 1780: Oxford University (2 seats)
Party	Candidate	Votes	%	±%
Tory	William Dolben	Unopposed	N/A	N/A
Tory	Francis Page	Unopposed	N/A	N/A

General election 1 April 1784: Oxford University (2 seats)
Party	Candidate	Votes	%	±%
Tory	William Dolben	Unopposed	N/A	N/A
Tory	Francis Page	Unopposed	N/A	N/A

=== Elections in the 1790s ===
General election 1790: Oxford University (2 seats)
Party	Candidate	Votes	%	±%
Tory	William Dolben	Unopposed	N/A	N/A
Tory	Francis Page	Unopposed	N/A	N/A

General election 1796: Oxford University (2 seats)
Party	Candidate	Votes	%	±%
Tory	William Dolben	Unopposed	N/A	N/A
Tory	Francis Page	Unopposed	N/A	N/A

=== Elections in the 1800s ===
- Resignation of Page

By-Election March 1801: Oxford University
Party	Candidate	Votes	%	±%
Tory	William Scott	Unopposed	N/A	N/A
Tory hold				

General election 1802: Oxford University (2 seats)
Party	Candidate	Votes	%	±%
Tory	William Dolben	Unopposed	N/A	N/A
Tory	William Scott	Unopposed	N/A	N/A

General election 1806: Oxford University (2 seats)
Party	Candidate	Votes	%	±%
Tory	William Scott	651	48.95	N/A
Tory	Charles Abbot	404	30.38	N/A
Tory	Richard Heber	275	20.68	N/A
Turnout		1,330	N/A	N/A

General election 1807: Oxford University (2 seats)
Party	Candidate	Votes	%	±%
Tory	William Scott	Unopposed	N/A	N/A
Tory	Charles Abbot	Unopposed	N/A	N/A

=== Elections in the 1810s ===
General election 1812: Oxford University (2 seats)
Party	Candidate	Votes	%	±%
Tory	William Scott	Unopposed	N/A	N/A
Tory	Charles Abbot	Unopposed	N/A	N/A

- Creation of Abbot as the 1st Lord Colchester

By-Election June 1817: Oxford University
Party	Candidate	Votes	%	±%
Tory	Robert Peel	Unopposed	N/A	N/A
Tory hold				

General election 1818: Oxford University (2 seats)
Party	Candidate	Votes	%	±%
Tory	William Scott	Unopposed	N/A	N/A
Tory	Robert Peel	Unopposed	N/A	N/A

=== Elections in the 1820s ===
General election 1820: Oxford University (2 seats)
Party	Candidate	Votes	%	±%
Tory	William Scott	Unopposed	N/A	N/A
Tory	Robert Peel	Unopposed	N/A	N/A

- Creation of Scott as the 1st Lord Stowell

By-Election August 1821: Oxford University
Party	Candidate	Votes	%	±%
Tory	Richard Heber	612	54.11	N/A
Tory	J. Nicholl	519	45.89	N/A
Majority		93	8.22	N/A
Turnout		1,131		N/A
Tory hold		Swing	N/A	

- Seat vacated on the appointment of Peel as Secretary of State for the Home Department

By-Election February 1822: Oxford University
Party	Candidate	Votes	%	±%
Tory	Robert Peel	Unopposed	N/A	N/A
Tory hold				

- Resignation of Heber

By-Election February 1826: Oxford University
Party	Candidate	Votes	%	±%
Tory	Thomas Grimston Estcourt	Unopposed	N/A	N/A
Tory hold				

General election 1826: Oxford University (2 seats)
Party	Candidate	Votes	%	±%
Tory	Robert Peel	Unopposed	N/A	N/A
Tory	Thomas Grimston Estcourt	Unopposed	N/A	N/A

- Seat vacated on the appointment of Peel as Secretary of State for the Home Department

By-Election February 1828: Oxford University
Party	Candidate	Votes	%	±%
Tory	Robert Peel	Unopposed	N/A	N/A
Tory hold				

- Resignation of Peel

By-Election February 1829: Oxford University
Party	Candidate	Votes	%	±%
Tory	Robert Inglis	755	55.35	N/A
Tory	Robert Peel	609	44.65	N/A
Majority		146	10.70	N/A
Turnout		1,354		N/A
Tory hold		Swing	N/A	

- Note (1829): Stooks Smith records that the polls were open for three days. Inglis was a candidate promoted by the Ultra-Tories in opposition to Catholic emancipation.

=== Elections in the 1830s ===
General election 1830: Oxford University (2 seats)
Party	Candidate	Votes	%
Tory	Thomas Grimston Estcourt	Unopposed	
Tory	Robert Inglis	Unopposed	
Tory hold			
Tory hold			

General election 1831: Oxford University (2 seats)
Party	Candidate	Votes	%
Tory	Thomas Grimston Estcourt	Unopposed	
Tory	Robert Inglis	Unopposed	
Registered electors		2,524	
Tory hold			
Tory hold			

General election 12 December 1832: Oxford University (2 seats)
Party	Candidate	Votes	%
Tory	Thomas Grimston Estcourt	Unopposed	
Tory	Robert Inglis	Unopposed	
Registered electors		2,496	
Tory hold			
Tory hold			

General election 8 January 1835: Oxford University (2 seats)
Party	Candidate	Votes	%
Conservative	Thomas Grimston Estcourt	Unopposed	
Conservative	Robert Inglis	Unopposed	
Registered electors		2,496	
Conservative hold			
Conservative hold			

General election 25 July 1837: Oxford University (2 seats)
Party	Candidate	Votes	%
Conservative	Thomas Grimston Estcourt	Unopposed	
Conservative	Robert Inglis	Unopposed	
Registered electors		2,496	
Conservative hold			
Conservative hold			

=== Elections in the 1840s ===
General election 29 June 1841: Oxford University (2 seats)
Party	Candidate	Votes	%	±%
Conservative	Thomas Grimston Estcourt	Unopposed		
Conservative	Robert Inglis	Unopposed		
Registered electors		2,496		
Conservative hold				
Conservative hold				

- Note (1841): McCalmont classifies Inglis as a Peelite candidate, at this election.

General election August 1847: Oxford University (2 seats)
Party	Candidate	Votes	%	±%
Conservative	Robert Inglis	1,700	48.3	N/A
Peelite	William Ewart Gladstone	997	28.3	N/A
Conservative	Charles Gray Round	824	23.4	N/A
Turnout		1,851	56.1	N/A
Registered electors		3,300		
Majority		703	20.0	N/A
Conservative hold		Swing	N/A	
Majority		173	4.9	N/A
Peelite gain from Conservative		Swing	N/A	

- Note (1847): Poll 5 days. (Source for this note and the number of voters: Stooks Smith). McCalmont classifies Inglis as a Peelite and Gladstone as a Liberal Conservative candidate, at this election.

=== Elections in the 1850s ===
General election July 1852: Oxford University (2 seats)
Party	Candidate	Votes	%	±%
Conservative	Robert Inglis	1,369	42.3	−6.0
Peelite	William Ewart Gladstone	1,108	34.3	+6.0
Conservative	Robert Bullock Marsham	758	23.4	—
Turnout		1,618 (est)	46.6 (est)	−9.5
Registered electors		3,474		
Majority		261	8.0	−12.0
Conservative hold		Swing	−6.0	
Majority		350	10.9	+6.0
Peelite hold		Swing	+6.0	

- Note (1852): Minimum possible turnout estimated by dividing votes by 2. To the extent that electors did not use both their votes, the figure will be an underestimate. McCalmont classifies Gladstone as a Liberal Conservative candidate, at this election.
- Seat vacated on the appointment of Gladstone as Chancellor of the Exchequer

By-election, 20 January 1853: Oxford University
Party	Candidate	Votes	%	±%
Peelite	William Ewart Gladstone	1,022	53.2	+18.9
Conservative	Dudley Montagu Perceval	898	46.8	−18.9
Majority		124	6.4	−4.5
Turnout		1,920	57.2	+10.6
Registered electors		3,357		
Peelite hold		Swing	+18.9	

- Resignation of Inglis.

By-election, 7 February 1854: Oxford University
Party	Candidate	Votes	%	±%
Conservative	Sir William Heathcote	Unopposed		
Conservative hold				

General election 27 March 1857: Oxford University (2 seats)
Party	Candidate	Votes	%	±%
Peelite	William Ewart Gladstone	Unopposed		
Conservative	Sir William Heathcote	Unopposed		
Registered electors		3,538		
Peelite hold				
Conservative hold				

- Seat vacated on the appointment of Gladstone as Lord High Commissioner to the Ionian Islands. McCalmont classifies Gladstone as a Liberal Conservative candidate, at this election.

By-election, 12 February 1859: Oxford University
Party	Candidate	Votes	%	±%
Peelite	William Ewart Gladstone	Unopposed		
Peelite hold				

General election 29 April 1859: Oxford University (2 seats)
Party	Candidate	Votes	%	±%
Liberal	William Ewart Gladstone	Unopposed		
Conservative	Sir William Heathcote	Unopposed		
Registered electors		3,623		
Liberal hold				
Conservative hold				

- Seat vacated on the appointment of Gladstone as Chancellor of the Exchequer. McCalmont classifies Gladstone as a Liberal candidate, at this election.

By-Election 1 July 1859: Oxford University
Party	Candidate	Votes	%	±%
Liberal	William Ewart Gladstone	1,050	55.0	N/A
Conservative	Marquess of Chandos	859	45.0	N/A
Majority		191	10.0	N/A
Turnout		1,909	52.7	N/A
Registered electors		3,623		
Liberal hold		Swing	N/A	

=== Elections in the 1860s ===
General election 18 July 1865: Oxford University (2 seats)
Party	Candidate	Votes	%	±%
Conservative	Sir William Heathcote	3,236	47.1	N/A
Conservative	Gathorne Hardy	1,904	27.7	N/A
Liberal	William Ewart Gladstone	1,724	25.1	N/A
Majority		180	2.6	N/A
Turnout		3,432 (est)	91.4 (est)	N/A
Registered electors		3,755		
Conservative hold		Swing	N/A	
Conservative hold		Swing	N/A	

- Note (1865): Turnout estimated in the same way as for the 1852 election.
- Seat vacated on the appointment of Hardy as President of the Poor Law Board

By-Election 12 July 1866: Oxford University
Party	Candidate	Votes	%	±%
Conservative	Gathorne Hardy	Unopposed		
Conservative hold				

- Seat vacated on the appointment of Hardy as Secretary of State for the Home Department

By-Election 20 May 1867: Oxford University
Party	Candidate	Votes	%	±%
Conservative	Gathorne Hardy	Unopposed		
Conservative hold				

General election 18 November 1868: Oxford University (2 seats)
Party	Candidate	Votes	%	±%
Conservative	Gathorne Hardy	Unopposed		
Conservative	'John Mowbray'	Unopposed		
Registered electors		4,190		
Conservative hold				
Conservative hold				

=== Elections in the 1870s ===
General election 31 January 1874: Oxford University (2 seats)
Party	Candidate	Votes	%	±%
Conservative	Gathorne Hardy	Unopposed		
Conservative	John Mowbray	Unopposed		
Registered electors		4,659		
Conservative hold				
Conservative hold				

- Seat vacated on the appointment of Hardy as Secretary of State for War

By-Election 14 March 1874: Oxford University
Party	Candidate	Votes	%	±%
Conservative	Gathorne Hardy	Unopposed		
Conservative hold				

- Creation of Hardy as the 1st Viscount Cranbrook

1878 Oxford University by-election
Party	Candidate	Votes	%	±%
Conservative	John Gilbert Talbot	2,687	73.1	N/A
Liberal	Henry John Stephen Smith	989	26.9	New
Majority		1,698	46.2	N/A
Turnout		3,676	73.1	N/A
Registered electors		5,026		
Conservative hold		Swing	N/A	

=== Elections in the 1880s ===
General election April 1880: Oxford University (2 seats)
Party	Candidate	Votes	%	±%
Conservative	John Mowbray	Unopposed		
Conservative	John Gilbert Talbot	Unopposed		
Registered electors		5,033		
Conservative hold				
Conservative hold				

General election 24 November 1885: Oxford University (2 seats)
Party	Candidate	Votes	%	±%
Conservative	John Mowbray	Unopposed		
Conservative	John Gilbert Talbot	Unopposed		
Conservative hold				
Conservative hold				

General election 2 July 1886: Oxford University (2 seats)
Party	Candidate	Votes	%	±%
Conservative	John Mowbray	Unopposed		
Conservative	John Gilbert Talbot	Unopposed		
Conservative hold				
Conservative hold				

=== Elections in the 1890s ===
General election July 1892: Oxford University (2 seats)
Party	Candidate	Votes	%	±%
Conservative	John Mowbray	Unopposed		
Conservative	John Gilbert Talbot	Unopposed		
Conservative hold				
Conservative hold				

General election 13 July 1895: Oxford University (2 seats)
Party	Candidate	Votes	%	±%
Conservative	John Mowbray	Unopposed		
Conservative	John Gilbert Talbot	Unopposed		
Conservative hold				
Conservative hold				

- Death of Mowbray

By-Election 11 May 1899: Oxford University
Party	Candidate	Votes	%	±%
Liberal Unionist	Sir William Anson	Unopposed		
Liberal Unionist hold				

=== Elections in the 1900s ===
General election 1 October 1900: Oxford University (2 seats)
Party	Candidate	Votes	%	±%
Conservative	John Gilbert Talbot	Unopposed		
Liberal Unionist	Sir William Anson	Unopposed		
Conservative hold				
Liberal Unionist hold				

General election 13 January 1906: Oxford University (2 seats)
Party	Candidate	Votes	%	±%
Conservative	John Gilbert Talbot	Unopposed		
Liberal Unionist	Sir William Anson	Unopposed		
Conservative hold				
Liberal Unionist hold				

=== Elections in the 1910s ===
General election 15 January 1910: Oxford University (2 seats)
Party	Candidate	Votes	%	±%
Liberal Unionist	Sir William Anson	Unopposed		
Conservative	Lord Hugh Cecil	Unopposed		
Liberal Unionist hold				
Conservative hold				

General election December 1910: Oxford University (2 seats)
Party	Candidate	Votes	%	±%
Liberal Unionist	Sir William Anson	Unopposed		
Conservative	Lord Hugh Cecil	Unopposed		
Liberal Unionist hold				
Conservative hold				

- Anson became a Conservative MP in 1912 when the Liberal Unionist Party formally merged with the Conservative Party.
- Death of Anson

By-Election 30 June 1914: Oxford University
Party	Candidate	Votes	%	±%
Unionist	Rowland Prothero	Unopposed		
Unionist hold				

- Electorate expanded and elections using the bloc vote replaced by those using the single transferable vote, by the Representation of the People Act 1918, from the 1918 United Kingdom general election.

General Election 1918: Oxford University (2 seats)
Party		Candidate	FPv%	Count	
Party		Candidate	FPv%	1	2
C	Unionist	Lord Hugh Cecil	49.80	2,771	
C	Unionist	Rowland Prothero	30.84	1,716	2,546
	Liberal	Gilbert Murray	13.34	742	812
	Labour	Henry Sanderson Furniss	6.02	335	351
Electorate: 7,907 Valid: 5,564 Quota: 1,855 Turnout: 70.37%
C indicates candidate endorsed by the coalition government.

- Creation of Prothero as 1st Lord Ernle

By-Election 19–24 March 1919: Oxford University
Party		Candidate	Votes	%	±%
C	Unionist	Charles Oman	2,613	52.52	−28.08
	Liberal	Gilbert Murray	1,330	26.73	+13.39
	Independent	J. Athelstan L. Riley	1,032	20.74	New
Majority			1,283	25.79	−41.47
Turnout			4,975	62.92	−7.35
Registered electors			7,907		
	Unionist hold		Swing		
C indicates candidate endorsed by the coalition government.

=== Elections in the 1920s ===
General Election 1922: Oxford University (2 seats)
Party	Candidate	FPv%	Count	
Party	Candidate	FPv%	1	2
Unionist	Lord Hugh Cecil	56.40	3,185	
Unionist	Charles Oman	18.03	1,018	2,170
Liberal	Gilbert Murray	25.57	1,444	1,594
Electorate: 9,374 Valid: 5,647 Quota: 1,883 Turnout: 60.24%

General Election 1923: Oxford University (2 seats)
Party	Candidate	FPv%	Count	
Party	Candidate	FPv%	1	2
Unionist	Lord Hugh Cecil	43.77	3,560	
Unionist	Charles Oman	27.12	2,206	2,950
Liberal	Gilbert Murray	29.11	2,368	2,472
Electorate: 10,814 Valid: 8,134 Quota: 2,712 Turnout: 75.22%

General Election 1924: Oxford University (2 seats) (Note: Gilbert Murray, who usually stood as a Liberal candidate in this election, instead stood as an independent in 1924.)
Party	Candidate	FPv%	Count	
Party	Candidate	FPv%	1	2
Unionist	Lord Hugh Cecil	49.65	4,320	
Unionist	Charles Oman	19.97	1,738	2,968
Independent	Gilbert Murray	30.38	2,643	2,832
Electorate: 10,773 Valid: 8,701 Quota: 2,901 Turnout: 80.77%

General Election 1929: Oxford University (2 seats)
Party	Candidate	FPv%	Count	
Party	Candidate	FPv%	1	2
Unionist	Lord Hugh Cecil	52.45	6,012	
Unionist	Charles Oman	18.97	2,174	4,112
Liberal	Gilbert Murray	28.59	3,277	3,529
Electorate: 15,770 Valid: 11,463 Quota: 3,822 Turnout: 72.69%

=== Elections in the 1930s ===
General election 1931: Oxford University (2 seats)
Party	Candidate	Votes	%	±%
Conservative	Lord Hugh Cecil	Unopposed	N/A	N/A
Conservative	Charles Oman	Unopposed	N/A	N/A

General Election 1935: Oxford University (2 seats)
Party	Candidate	FPv%	Count		
Party	Candidate	FPv%	1	2	3
Conservative	Lord Hugh Cecil	48.32	7,365		
Independent	A. P. Herbert	22.24	3,390	3,864	5,206
Conservative	C. R. M. F. Cruttwell	11.83	1,803	3,520	3,697
Labour	J. L. Stocks	17.60	2,683	2,776	eliminated
Electorate: 22,413 Valid: 15,241 Quota: 5,081 Turnout: 68.00%

- Resignation of Cecil

By-Election 23≠27 February 1937: Oxford University
Party	Candidate	Votes	%	±%
Independent	Arthur Salter	7,580	50.18	N/A
Conservative	Farquhar Buzzard	3,917	25.93	−34.22
Ind. Conservative	Frederick Lindemann	3,608	23.89	New
Majority		3,663	24.25	N/A
Turnout		15,105	62.68	N/A
Registered electors		24,021		
Independent gain from Conservative		Swing		

=== Elections in the 1940s ===
General election 1945: Oxford University (2 seats)
Party	Candidate	Votes	%	±%
Independent	Arthur Salter	6,771	44.19	N/A
Independent	A. P. Herbert	5,136	33.52	+11.28
Labour	G. D. H. Cole	3,414	22.28	+4.68
Majority		1,722	11.24	
Turnout		15,321	53.08	−14.92
Registered electors		28,865		
Quota		5,108		
Independent hold		Swing		
Independent hold		Swing		

- As two candidates achieved the quota only one count was necessary
- Constituency abolished (1950)

== Bibliography ==
- Boundaries of Parliamentary Constituencies 1885–1972, compiled and edited by F. W. S. Craig (Parliamentary Reference Publications 1972)
- British Parliamentary Election Results 1832–1885, compiled and edited by F. W. S. Craig (Macmillan Press 1977)
- British Parliamentary Election Results 1885–1918, compiled and edited by F. W. S. Craig (Macmillan Press 1974)
- British Parliamentary Election Results 1918–1949, compiled and edited by F. W. S. Craig (Macmillan Press, revised edition 1977)
- McCalmont's Parliamentary Poll Book: British Election Results 1832–1918 (8th edition, The Harvester Press 1971)
- The House of Commons 1715–1754, by Romney Sedgwick (HMSO 1970)
- The House of Commons 1754–1790, by Sir Lewis Namier and John Brooke (HMSO 1964)
- The Parliaments of England by Henry Stooks Smith (1st edition published in three volumes 1844–50), second edition edited (in one volume) by F. W. S. Craig (Political Reference Publications 1973))
- Who's Who of British Members of Parliament: Volume I 1832–1885, edited by M. Stenton (The Harvester Press 1976)
- Who's Who of British Members of Parliament, Volume II 1886–1918, edited by M. Stenton and S. Lees (Harvester Press 1978)
- Who's Who of British Members of Parliament, Volume III 1919–1945, edited by M. Stenton and S. Lees (Harvester Press 1979)
- Who's Who of British Members of Parliament, Volume IV 1945–1979, edited by M. Stenton and S. Lees (Harvester Press 1981)
- Leigh Rayment's Historical List of MPs – Constituencies beginning with "O"
