= 1937 Oxford University by-election =

UK Parliamentary by-election

The 1937 Oxford University by-election was held on 27 February 1937. The by-election was held due to the appointment as provost of Eton College of the incumbent Conservative MP, Lord Hugh Cecil. It was won by the Independent candidate Arthur Salter.

By-Election 23–27 February 1937: Oxford University
Party	Candidate	Votes	%	±%
Independent	Arthur Salter	7,580	50.18	N/A
Conservative	Farquhar Buzzard	3,917	25.93	−34.22
Ind. Conservative	Frederick Lindemann	3,608	23.89	New
Majority		3,663	24.25	N/A
Turnout		15,105	62.68	N/A
Registered electors		24,021		
Independent gain from Conservative		Swing		
