= 1874 Oxford University by-election =

UK Parliamentary by-election

The 1874 Oxford University by-election was fought on 14 March 1874. The by-election was fought due to the incumbent Conservative MP, Gathorne Hardy, becoming Secretary of State for War. It was retained by the incumbent.
