= Sir William Anson, 3rd Baronet =

19th/20th-century British politician

The Right Honourable Sir William Anson Bt, FBA
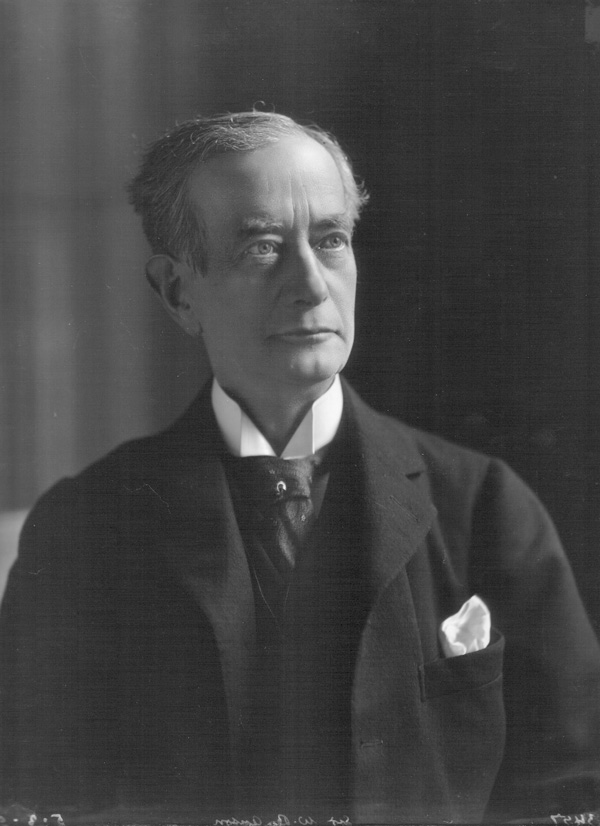
- Anson in 1906

Parliamentary Secretary to the Board of Education
- In office 11 August 1902 – 4 December 1905
- Monarch: Edward VII
- Prime Minister: Arthur Balfour
- Preceded by: New office
- Succeeded by: Thomas Lough

Personal details
- Born: 14 November 1843 Walberton, Sussex
- Died: 4 June 1914 (aged 70)
- Party: Liberal Unionist (before 1912); Conservative (after 1912)
- Education: Balliol College, Oxford

Sir William Reynell Anson, 3rd Baronet, PC, FBA (14 November 1843 – 4 June 1914) was a British jurist and Liberal Unionist turned Conservative politician from the Anson family.

== Background and education ==
Anson was born at Walberton, Sussex, the eldest son of Sir John William Hamilton Anson, 2nd Baronet, and his wife Elizabeth Catherine (née Pack). Educated at Eton, 1857–62, and Balliol College, Oxford, 1862–66, he took a first class in both Classical Moderations, 1863, and Literae Humaniores ('Greats', a combination of philosophy and ancient history), 1866. He was elected to a fellowship of All Souls in the following year.

== Legal and political career ==
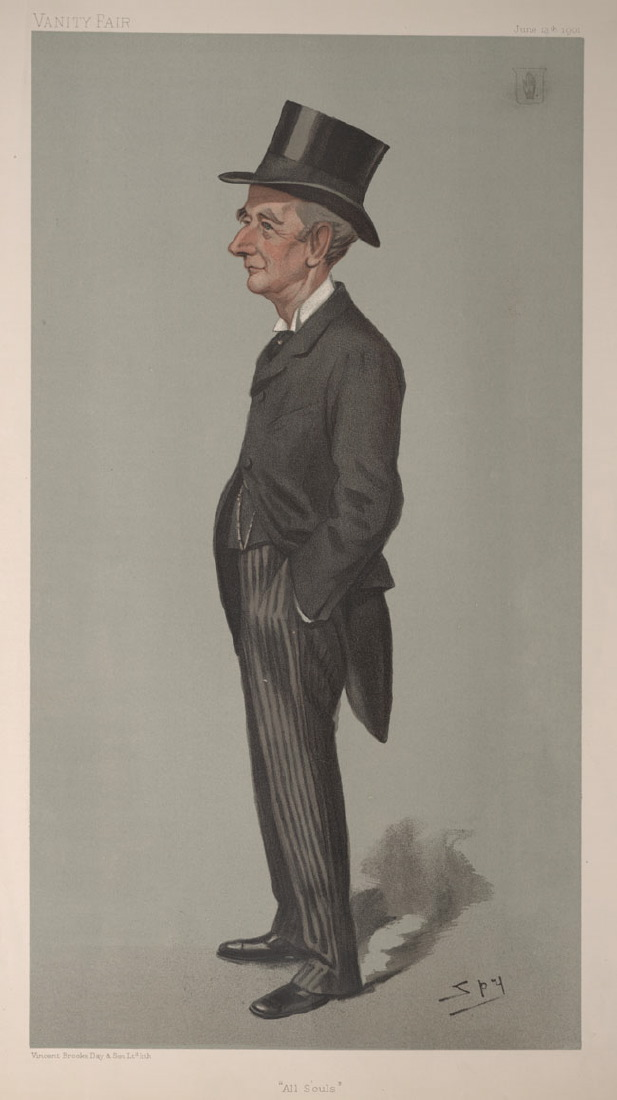
"All Souls". Caricature by Spy published in Vanity Fair in 1901.

In 1869, he was called to the Bar, and went on the home circuit until 1873, when he succeeded to the baronetcy. In 1874, he became Vinerian reader in English law at Oxford, a post attached to a Fellowship of All Souls College, which he held until he became, in 1881, Warden of All Souls.

Anson identified himself both with local and university interests; he became an alderman of the city of Oxford in 1892, chairman of quarter sessions for the county in 1894, was Vice-Chancellor of Oxford University in 1898–1899, and Chancellor of the Diocese of Oxford in 1899. In that year he was returned, without opposition, as Member of Parliament (MP) for Oxford University in the Liberal Unionist interest, and consequently resigned the vice-chancellorship.

In Parliament, Anson preserved an active interest in education, being a member of the newly created consultative committee of the Board of Education in 1900, and in August 1902 he became the first Parliamentary Secretary to the Board of Education, a post he held until 1905. He was made a Privy Counsellor in 1911.

Anson took an active part in the foundation of a school of law at Oxford, and taught law to undergraduates of Trinity College, Oxford, from 1886 to 1898. His volumes on The Principles of the English Law of Contract (1884, 11th ed. 1906), and on The Law and Custom of the Constitution in two parts, "The Parliament" and "The Crown" (1886–1892, 3rd ed. 1907, pt. 1 .vol. ii.), became standard works.

He received the honorary degree Doctor of Laws (LL.D.) from the Victoria University of Manchester in February 1902, in connection with the 50th jubilee celebrations of the establishment of the university.

He was on the governing body of Abingdon School from 1900 until his death in 1914.

== Personal life ==
Anson died in June 1914, aged 70. He never married and was succeeded in the baronetcy by his nephew, Denis.

== See also ==
- Oxford Dictionary of National Biography
- English contract law

Academic offices
Preceded by Francis Knyvett Leighton	Warden of All Souls College, Oxford; 1881–1914	Succeeded by Francis William Pember
Preceded by John Richard Magrath	Vice-Chancellor of Oxford University; 1898–1899	Succeeded by Thomas Fowler
Parliament of the United Kingdom
Preceded by John Gilbert Talbot; Sir John Mowbray, Bt	Member of Parliament for Oxford University; John Gilbert Talbot, 1899–January 1910; Lord Hugh Cecil, January 1910–1914; 1899–1914	Succeeded by Rowland Prothero; Lord Hugh Cecil
Political offices
New office	Parliamentary Secretary to the Board of Education; 1902–1905	Succeeded by Thomas Lough
Baronetage of the United Kingdom
Preceded by John William Hamilton Anson	Baronet (of Hatch Beauchamp); 1873–1914	Succeeded by Denis George William Anson
