= Malpas Court =

Country house in Newport

Coordinates: 51°36′59″N 3°00′51″W

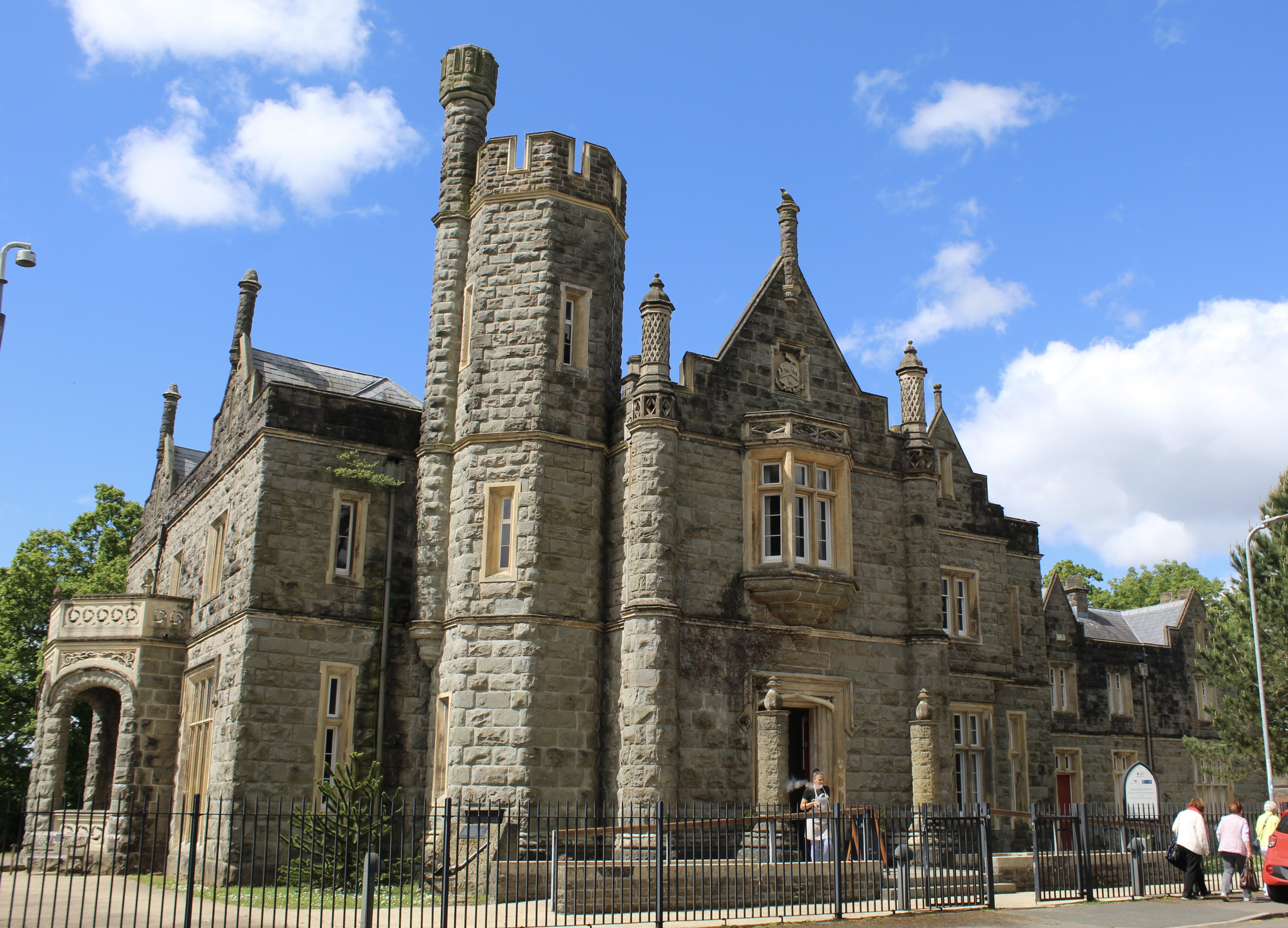
- "the first completely new mansion designed by T. H. Wyatt"
- Interactive map of the Malpas Court area

General information
- Type: Country house
- Architectural style: Tudor Revival
- Location: Malpas, in Newport, Wales
- Completed: c.1838
- Client: Thomas Prothero

Listed Building – Grade II
- Official name: Malpas Court
- Designated: 21 March 1997; 29 years ago
- Reference no.: 18285

Malpas Court is a Grade II listed, 19th-century country house in the community of Malpas, in Newport, Wales.

== History ==
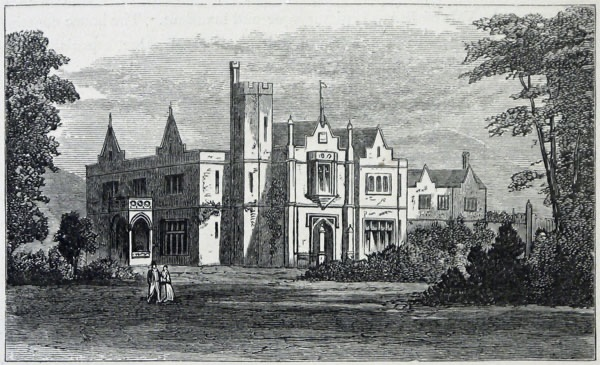
Malpas Court c.1870s

Malpas Court was built between 1834 and 1838 by T. H. Wyatt for Thomas Prothero, a local businessman and agent to Sir Charles Morgan's Tredegar Estate. Prothero was an opposer of John Frost and Chartism, for which Frost publicly reprimanded him on numerous occasions. In c.1849, Prothero offered £500 towards the rebuilding of the nearby Church of St. Mary, Malpas, on the condition that it was rebuilt closer to Malpas Court; when his offer was rejected, he reduced his contribution to £250. Thomas Prothero died in 1853. The Prothero family resided at the house until 1916 when it was sold to L. W. Llewelyn (1874–1924), a director of mining companies. Llewelyn sold the house in 1924 on moving to Llanfrechfa Grange, from which point it seems to have been vacant until 1939, when a Kelly's Directory gives it as being occupied by George Workman, a caretaker.

During the Second World War, the house was used by American military personnel and around 100 Nissen huts were erected in the grounds. In 1947, the property was bought by Newport Borough Council following which the grounds were developed into a housing estate and the house itself into a social club. In the 1980s, the house was used as a betting shop and was in a state of disrepair. In 1997, the house was designated as a Grade II listed building and in the 21st-century was restored aided by grants of £2.7m from the European Regional Development Fund and £750,000 from the National Lottery Heritage Fund. As of 2026, the house is leased by the council for conferences.

== Architecture ==
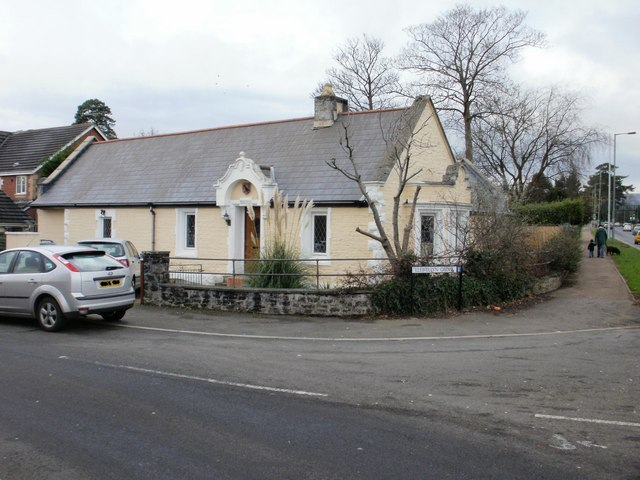
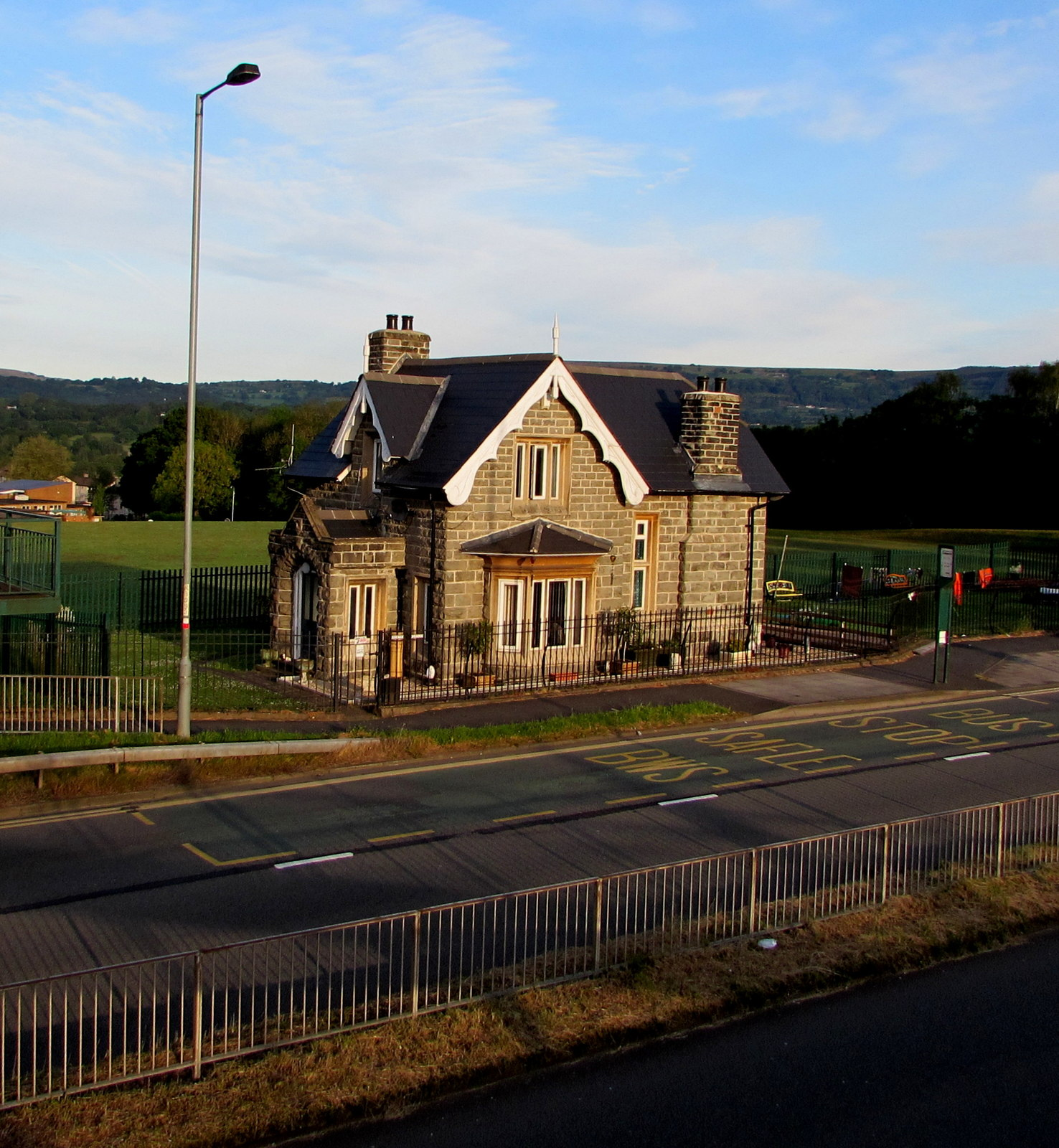
South Lodge (left) and North Lodge (right) on Malpas Road, built to serve the Malpas Court Estate. Now in private ownership.

Malpas Court was built between 1834 and 1838 of brown rock-faced stone in the Tudor Revival style. (Note: In his Gwent/Monmouthshire volume in the Pevsner Buildings of Wales series, John Newman narrows the date down to 1836 to 1838.) Cadw suggests that Wyatt may have been inspired by the nearby Llantarnam Abbey in his design. In his Gwent/Monmouthshire volume in the Pevsner Buildings of Wales series, John Newman states that Malpas Court was "the first completely new mansion designed by T. H. Wyatt". To the left of the main entrance is a polygonal castellated tower. Malpas Court was designated as a Grade II listed building on 21 March 1997 as "a substantial early C19 house in the Tudor style, by a well-known architect of regional importance".
