= Lucy Knightley =

British politician

Lucy Knightley (1742–1791) was a British politician who sat in the House of Commons between 1763 and 1784.

== Early life ==
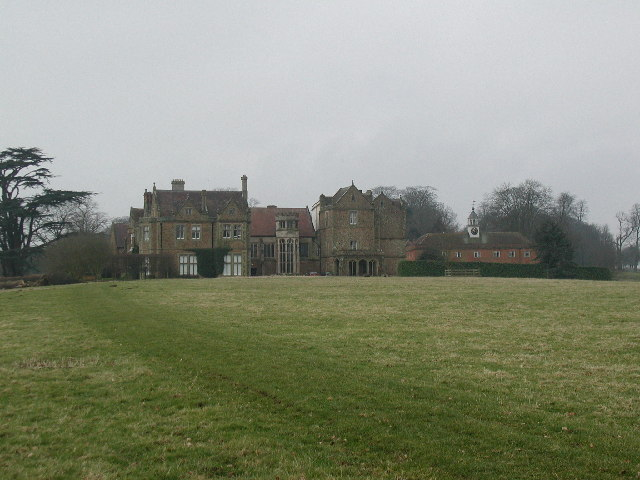
Fawsley Hall

Knightley was the son of Valentine Knightley of Fawsley, Northamptonshire and his wife Elizabeth Dummer, daughter of Edward Dummer of Swaythling, Hampshire and was born on 23 February 1742.

He was educated at Rugby School in 1748 and at Eton College from 1755 to 1759. In 1760, he matriculated at Brasenose College, Oxford on 26 January aged 17. On the death of his father on 2 May 1754, he had succeeded to Fawsley Hall, which he developed in the 1760s by employing Capability Brown on his gardens.

== Career ==
He was High Sheriff of Northamptonshire in 1770–71.

Knightley was returned for Member of Parliament for Northampton at a by-election on 21 November 1763 on the Compton interest. During this period he is only known to have voted once in 1767. He did not stand at the 1768 general election. He is generally described in parliamentary lists as ‘country gentleman’ or ‘Tory’. In a by-election on 14 January 1773 he was returned unopposed as MP for Northamptonshire. His voting record shows him to have been very independent. He was returned for Northamptonshire unopposed in 1774 and 1780. At the 1784 general election he declined to stand owing to ill-health. He does not appear to have spoken in the House.

== Personal life ==
He married Catherine Dashwood, daughter of Sir James Dashwood, 2nd Baronet on 14 April 1764.

Knightley died on 28 January 1791. He and his wife Catherine had no children.

Parliament of Great Britain
Preceded by Spencer Compton; Frederick Montagu	Member of Parliament for Northampton; 1763–1768; With: Frederick Montagu	Succeeded by Vice-Admiral Sir George Brydges Rodney; Sir George Osborn, Bt.
Preceded by Sir Edmund Isham, Bt; Sir William Dolben, Bt	Member of Parliament for Northamptonshire; 1773–1784; With: Sir William Dolben, Bt; Thomas Powys	Succeeded by Sir James Langham, Bt; Thomas Powys
