= Rhydderch =

Rhydderch or Riderch is a Welsh male given name being a compound of the elements "rhi" (ruler) and "derch" (exalted). Earliest mentions of the name are:

- Riderch I of Alt Clut (Rhydderch Hael) (fl. 580; died c. 614)
- Riderch II of Alt Clut (fl. early 9th century)
- Rhydderch ap Dyfnwal (fl. 971)
- Rhydderch ap Iestyn (died 1033)

== See also ==
- Llanddewi Rhydderch, Monmouthshire
- White Book of Rhydderch, a Welsh manuscript compiled for Rhydderch ab Ieuan Llwyd (c. 1325–1400)
- Prothero
