= 1914 Oxford University by-election =

UK Parliamentary by-election

The 1914 Oxford University by-election was held on 30 June 1914. The by-election was held due to the death of the incumbent Conservative MP, Sir William Anson. It was won by the Conservative candidate Rowland Prothero, who was elected unopposed.
