= John Gilbert Talbot =

British Conservative Party politician (1835–1910)

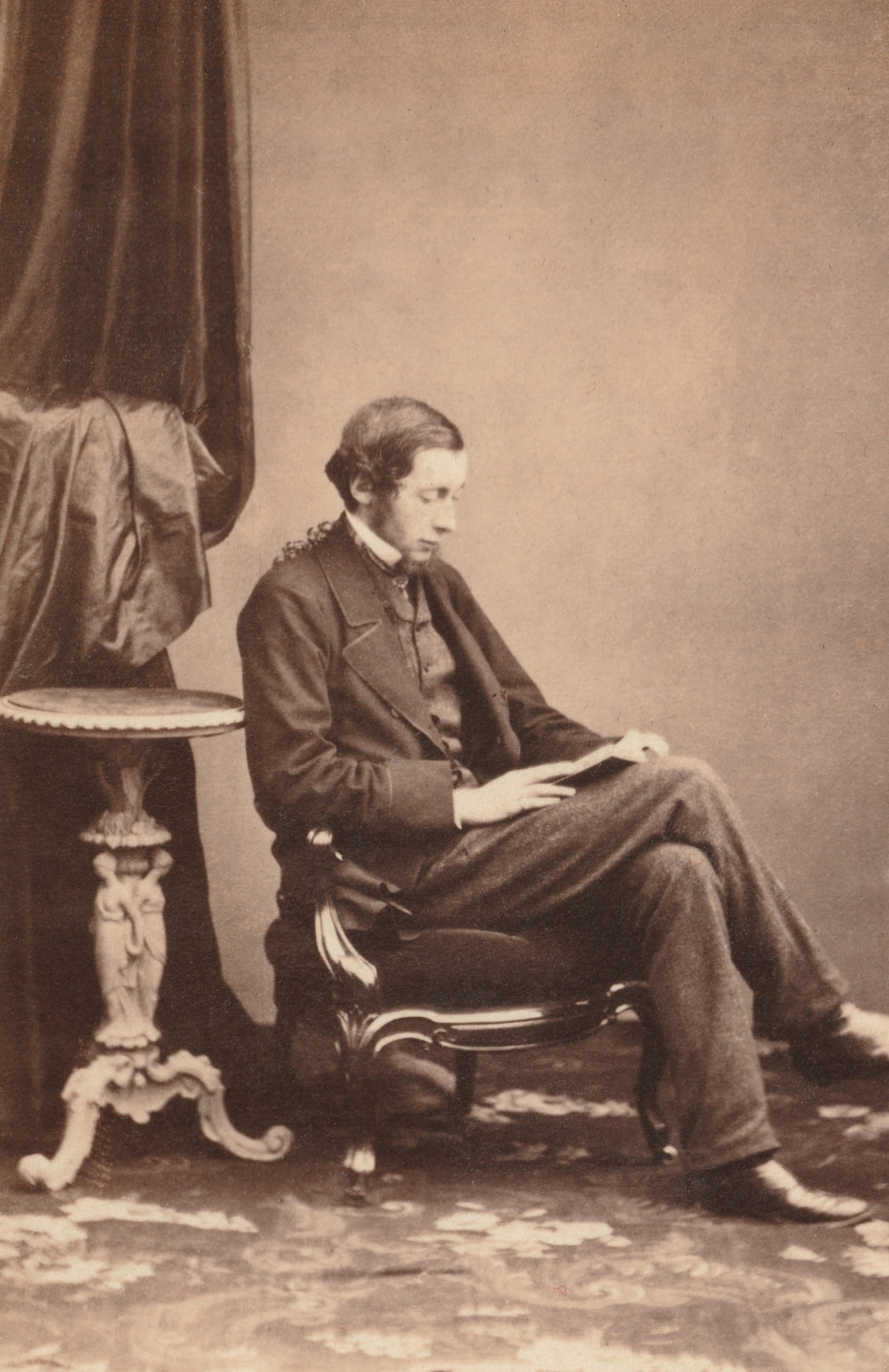
London studio photograph

John Gilbert Talbot PC (24 February 1835 – 1 February 1910), was a British Conservative Party politician.

== Background ==
Talbot was the son of the Honourable John Chetwynd-Talbot, the fourth son of Charles Chetwynd-Talbot, 2nd Earl Talbot. His mother was the Honourable Caroline Jane, daughter of James Stuart-Wortley-Mackenzie, 1st Baron Wharncliffe, grandson of Prime Minister John Stuart, 3rd Earl of Bute. The Right Reverend Edward Talbot, Bishop of Winchester, was his younger brother and Henry Chetwynd-Talbot, 18th Earl of Shrewsbury, his uncle.

== Political career ==
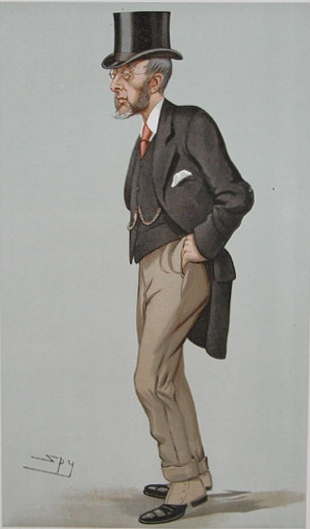
Talbot as caricatured by Spy in Vanity Fair, July 1897

Talbot entered Parliament at the 1868 general election for Kent West, a seat he held until 1878, when he resigned to fight a by-election in the Oxford University constituency. He won the by-election, and held that seat until he stepped down at the January 1910 general election. He served under Benjamin Disraeli as Parliamentary Secretary to the Board of Trade from 1878 to 1880 and was sworn of the Privy Council in 1897.

== Family ==
Talbot married in 1860 the Honourable Meriel Sarah Lyttelton, daughter of George Lyttelton, 4th Baron Lyttelton, and sister of the Honourable Alfred Lyttelton. They had four sons and six daughters:

- Sir George Talbot (1861–1938) was a Judge of the High Court of Justice.
- Mary Talbot (d.1897); married in 1896 Rt. Rev. Winfrid Oldfield Burrows (1858–1929), later Bishop of Chichester; and left a daughter.
- Bertram Chetwyn Talbot (1865–1936); married on 21 February 1903 the Dowager Marchioness of Lothian, née Lady Victoria Alexandria Montague Douglas Scott (1844–1938), daughter of 5th Duke of Buccleuch and widow of Schomberg Kerr, 9th Marquess of Lothian.
- Dame Meriel Lucy Talbot (1866–1956) became a public servant and women's welfare worker.
- Caroline Agnes Talbot (d.1930); married in 1891 Talbot Baines (d.1927).
- John Edward Talbot (1870–1937); married 1898 Mabel Balfour (1866–1949), daughter of Archibald Balfour, and left children.
- Eustace Talbot (1873–1905)
- Evelyn Talbot (1873–1962)
- Gwendolen Talbot (1877–1960); who married in 1905 Sir Guy Stephenson (1865–1930), and left children.
- Margaret Isabel Talbot (1878–1974); who married Randal McDonnell, 7th Earl of Antrim (1878–1933), and left children.

Talbot died in February 1910, aged 74. His wife survived him by fifteen years and died in April 1925.

== See also ==
- Earl Talbot
- Earl of Shrewsbury

== Notes ==
Parliament of the United Kingdom
Preceded by Viscount Holmesdale; William Hart Dyke	Member of Parliament for Kent West; 1868–1878; With: Charles Mills	Succeeded by Charles Mills; Viscount Lewisham
Preceded by Gathorne Hardy; John Mowbray	Member of Parliament for Oxford University; 1878 – January 1910; With: John Mowbray 1878–1899; Sir William Anson, Bt 1878–1910	Succeeded by: Sir William Anson, Bt; Lord Hugh Cecil
Political offices
Preceded by Edward Stanhope	Parliamentary Secretary to the Board of Trade; 1878–1880	Succeeded by Evelyn Ashley
