= 1919 Oxford University by-election =

UK Parliamentary by-election

- 19–24 March 1919
- Registered: 7,907
- Turnout: 62.9%

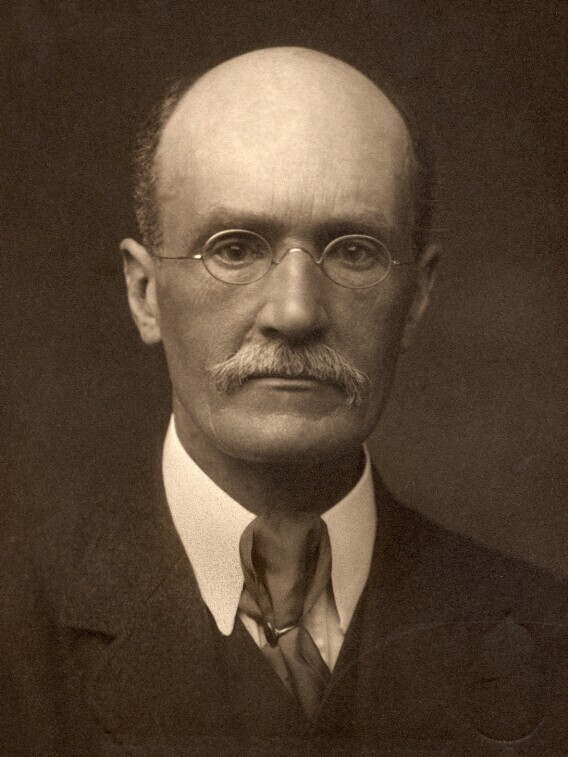
			Ind
Candidate	Charles Oman	Gilbert Murray	Athelstan Riley
Party	Unionist	Liberal	Independent
Alliance	Coalition
Popular vote	2,613	1,330	1,032
Percentage	52.5%	26.7%	20.7%
Swing	▼28.1%	▲13.4%	New
MP before election
Rowland Prothero
Unionist
Subsequent MP
Charles Oman
Unionist

The 1919 Oxford University by-election was held on 19–24 March 1919 after the incumbent Coalition Conservative MP, Rowland Prothero was created as the first Lord Ernle. It was retained by the Conservative candidate Prof. Charles Oman.

== Result ==
By-Election 19–24 March 1919: Oxford University
Party		Candidate	Votes	%	±%
C	Unionist	Charles Oman	2,613	52.5	–28.1
	Liberal	Gilbert Murray	1,330	26.7	+13.4
	Independent	J. Athelstan L. Riley	1,032	20.7	New
Majority			1,283	25.8	–41.5
Turnout			4,975	62.92	−7.5
Registered electors			7,907		
	Unionist hold		Swing		
C indicates candidate endorsed by the coalition government.
