= Sir William Dolben, 3rd Baronet =

British politician and abolitionist (1727–1814)

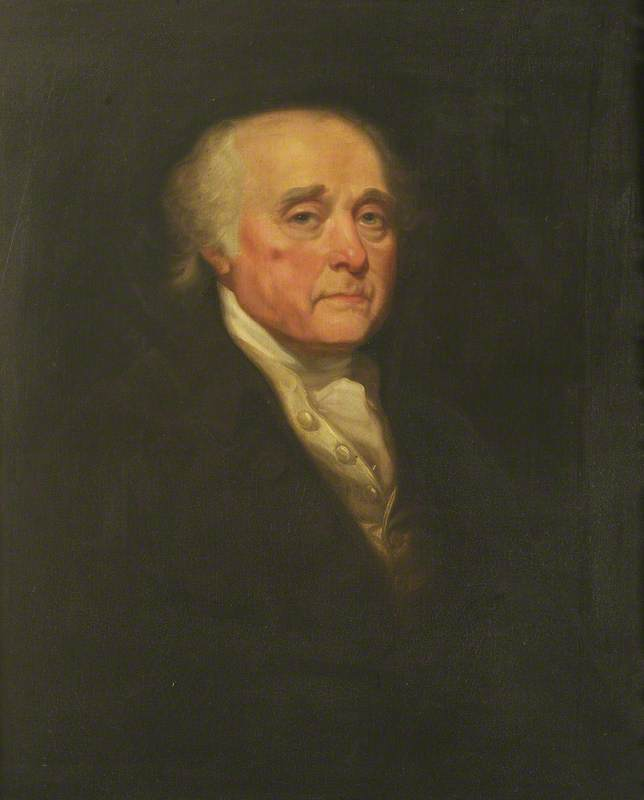
c. 1802 portrait of Dolben by Mather Brown

Sir William Dolben, 3rd Baronet (12 January 1727 – 20 March 1814) was a British Tory politician and abolitionist.

He was born in Finedon, Northamptonshire, the only surviving son of Sir John Dolben, 2nd Baronet and his wife Elizabeth Digby (died 1730), daughter of William Digby, 5th Baron Digby and Lady Jane Noel. He was educated at Westminster School and Christ Church, Oxford, matriculating in 1744. After leaving Oxford he married in 1748 Judith, daughter of Somerset English, heiress to a considerable fortune. In 1756 he inherited the baronetcy on the death of his father.

He was appointed High Sheriff of Northamptonshire for 1760 and in 1766 a verderer of Rockingham Forest. After a short period in early 1768 as a stopgap MP for Oxford University, he was returned at the general election in March 1768 as MP for Northamptonshire from 1768 to 1774. In 1780 he was re-adopted by the university and represented them again from 1780 until 1806.

During the French Revolutionary War he was appointed as a Captain in the Northamptonshire Provisional Cavalry in 1797. The provisional cavalry was short-lived, but the following year he was commissioned into the Northamptonshire Supplementary Militia, in which his grandson William Somerset Dolben also served. When war was resumed in 1803 he raised and commanded the Finedon Volunteers as Captain-Commandant with his son John English Dolben as his Lieutenant.

During his long parliamentary career as an independent MP, he was a fervent advocate of parliamentary reform and the abolition of slavery. He took up the abolitionist cause after he chanced to visit a slave ship docked in the port of London; the conditions he found on the ship so horrified him that he resolved at once to work for abolition.

The slave ship he documented, the Brookes, became infamous for the depictions that were drawn by William Elford and later published by Thomas Clarkson to support the anti-slavery movement.With the support of other abolitionists like William Pitt, Dolben put forward a bill (Dolben's Bill) in 1788 to regulate conditions on board slave ships; it passed as the Slave Trade Act 1788 (Dolben's Act) by a large majority.

After the death of his first wife in 1771, he married in 1789 a second cousin, Charlotte Scotchmer, née Affleck. He died in Bury St Edmunds in 1814, aged eighty-seven, and was buried at Finedon church. He was succeeded in the title and estates by John English Dolben, his only surviving son from his first marriage.

Parliament of Great Britain
Preceded by Sir Walter Bagot, Bt; Sir Roger Newdigate, Bt	Member of Parliament for Oxford University; February 1768–March 1768; With: Sir Roger Newdigate, Bt	Succeeded by Francis Page; Sir Roger Newdigate, Bt
Preceded by Sir Edmund Isham, Bt; William Cartwright	Member of Parliament for Northamptonshire; March 1768–1774; With: Sir Edmund Isham, Bt to 1773; Lucy Knightley from 1773	Succeeded by Lucy Knightley; Thomas Powys
Preceded by Francis Page; Sir Roger Newdigate, Bt	Member of Parliament for Oxford University; 1780–1800; With: Francis Page	Succeeded by Parliament of the United Kingdom
Parliament of the United Kingdom
Preceded by Parliament of Great Britain	Member of Parliament for Oxford University; 1801–1806; With: Francis Page to 1801; William Scott from March 1801	Succeeded by William Scott; Charles Abbot, 1st Baron Colchester
Baronetage of England
Preceded by John Dolben	Baronet (of Findon); 1756–1814	Succeeded by John Dolben
