= Francis Page (died 1803) =

British politician

Francis Page (né Bourne) (c. 1726–1803) was a British politician who sat in the House of Commons for 33 years from 1768 to 1801.

Page was born Francis Bourne, the son of Richard Bourne of Ombersley, Worcestershire and his wife Isabella Smith, niece of judge Sir Francis Page. He succeeded to the estates of his uncle Sir Francis Page and took name of Page in 1741, as a condition of his inheritance. He matriculated at New College, Oxford on 29 April 1743, aged 16 and was created MA on 1 August 1747 and DCL on 14 April 1749. He was High Sheriff of Oxfordshire for 1752–1753. He embellished and consolidated the estate he inherited at Middle Aston.

Page had no great political or intellectual attainments, but was devoted to the Church and University. He was elected as Member of Parliament for Oxford University in 1768 after a contest, and held his seat unopposed for 33 years. By 1790 he was secure in his seat for as long as he wished to hold it but he was politically negligible apart from his attachment to Tory principles in church and state. Early in 1793 he was so ill that there was a canvass for his seat, and on 10 December 1795 he took leave of absence for two weeks to recover his health. In April 1796 he decided to offer himself for re-election in the 1796 general election. Having come into the 1st United Kingdom Parliament in 1801, he resigned his seat within the first quarter of 1801.

Page died on 24 August 1803 in his 78th year. He left his estate to his nephew William Sturges who took the additional name of Bourne and subsequently sold Middle Aston for £13,166 to Sir Clement Cottrell Dormer.

== Sources ==
Parliament of Great Britain
Preceded by Sir William Dolben, Bt; Sir Roger Newdigate, Bt	Member of Parliament for Oxford University; 1768–1801; With: Sir Roger Newdigate, Bt 1768-1780; Sir William Dolben, Bt 1780-1801	Succeeded by Sir William Scott; Sir William Dolben, Bt
