= Hugh Cecil, 1st Baron Quickswood =

British politician

The Right Honourable The Lord Quickswood PC
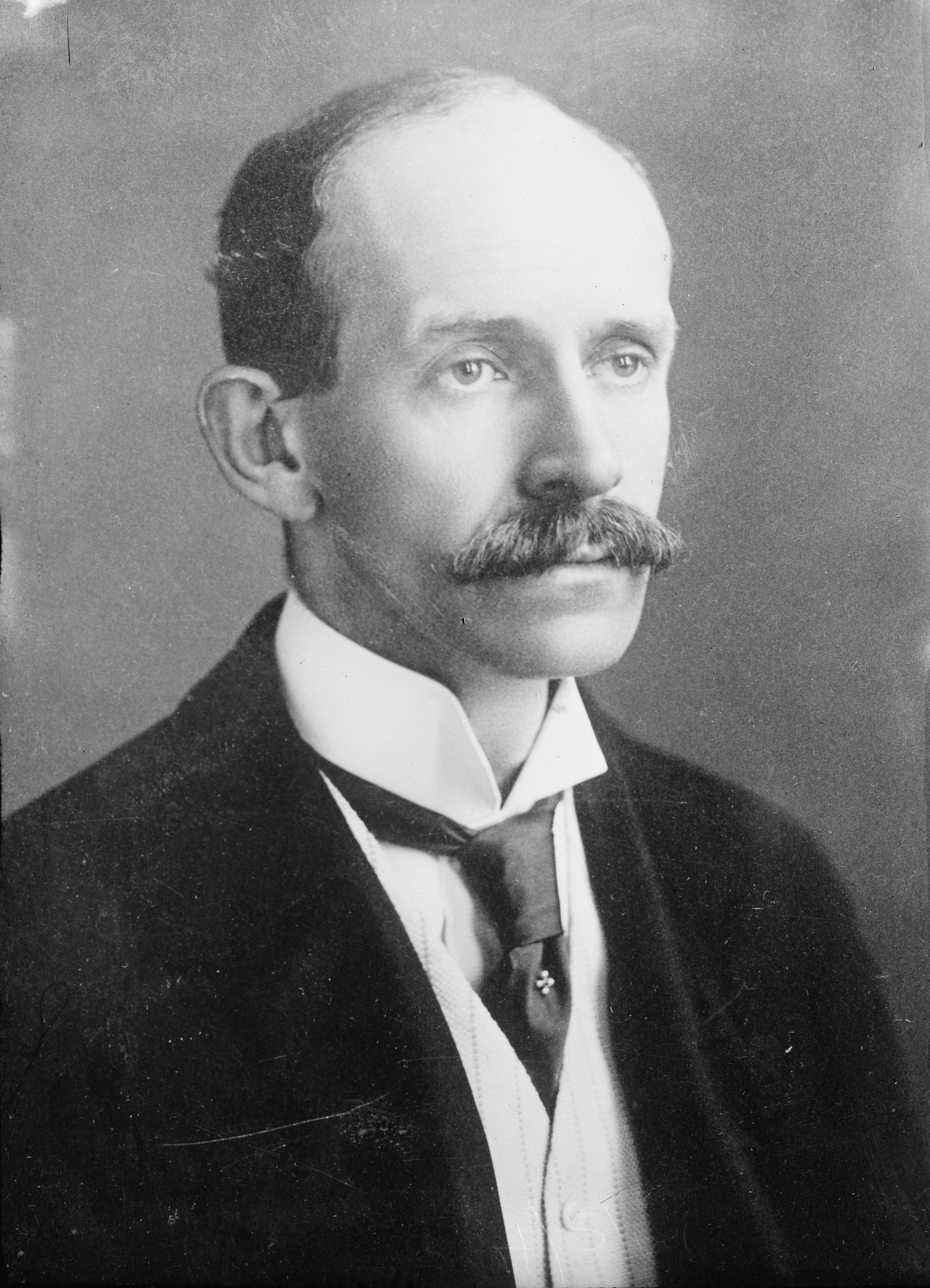
- Lord Hugh Cecil, circa 1914

Member of the House of Lords Lord Temporal
- In office 25 January 1941 – 10 December 1956; Hereditary peerage
- Preceded by: Peerage created
- Succeeded by: Peerage extinct

Member of Parliament for Oxford University
- In office 15 January 1910 – 23 February 1937
- Preceded by: John Gilbert Talbot
- Succeeded by: Arthur Salter

Member of Parliament for Greenwich
- In office 13 July 1895 – 8 February 1906
- Preceded by: Thomas Boord
- Succeeded by: Richard Jackson

Personal details
- Born: Hugh Richard Heathcote Gascoyne-Cecil; 14 October 1869 Hertfordshire, England
- Died: 10 December 1956 (aged 87) Sussex, England
- Party: Conservative
- Parent(s): Robert Gascoyne-Cecil, 3rd Marquess of Salisbury; Georgina Alderson
- Education: University College, Oxford

Hugh Richard Heathcote Gascoyne-Cecil, 1st Baron Quickswood PC (14 October 1869 – 10 December 1956), styled Lord Hugh Cecil until 1941, was a British Conservative Party politician.

== Background and education ==
Cecil was the eighth and youngest child of Robert Gascoyne-Cecil, 3rd Marquess of Salisbury, three times Prime Minister of the United Kingdom, and Georgina Alderson, daughter of Sir Edward Hall Alderson. He was the brother of James Gascoyne-Cecil, 4th Marquess of Salisbury, Lord William Cecil, Lord Cecil of Chelwood and Lord Edward Cecil and a first cousin of Prime Minister Arthur Balfour. He was educated at Eton and University College, Oxford. He graduated with first-class honours in Modern History in 1891 and was a fellow of Hertford College, Oxford, from 1891 until 1936, when he considered that he could not be Provost of Eton College and simultaneously a Fellow of Hertford.

== Political career ==
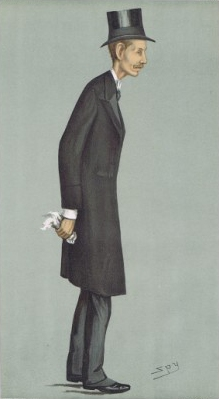
"Greenwich". Cecil as caricatured by Spy (Leslie Ward) in Vanity Fair, October 1900

After his graduation as BA in 1891, Cecil went to work in parliament. From 1891 to 1892 he was Assistant Private Secretary to his father, who was Foreign Secretary. Having paid his subscription he was elevated to MA in 1894, and entered the Commons as Conservative Member of Parliament (MP) for Greenwich in 1895. He took a keen interest in ecclesiastical questions and became an active member of the Church party, resisting attempts by nonconformists and secularists to take the discipline of the Church out of the hands of the archbishops and bishops, and to remove the bishops from their seats in the House of Lords. In a speech on the second reading of Balfour's Education Bill of 1902, he maintained that for the final settlement of the religious difficulty there must be cooperation between the Church of England and nonconformity, which was the Church's natural ally; and that the only possible basis of agreement was that every child should be brought up in the belief of its parents. The ideal to be aimed at in education was the improvement of the national character. In the later stages of the bill's progress, he strongly resented an amendment approved by the House and taken over by the Government giving the school managers (governors, in modern parlance), instead of the local vicar, control of religious education in voluntary, i.e. church, schools. (Note: Sometimes known at the time as 'non-provided schools' as they had not been set up by the state under the Elementary Education Act 1870.) This was not the only point on which he showed considerable independence of the government of which Balfour, his cousin, was the head.

During the early 20th century, Cecil (known to his friends as "Linky") was the eponymous leader of the Hughligans, a group of privileged young Tory Members of Parliament critical of their own party's leadership. Modelled after Lord Randolph Churchill's Fourth Party, the Hughligans included Cecil, F. E. Smith, Arthur Stanley, Ian Malcolm and, until 1904, Winston Churchill. Cecil was the best man at Churchill's wedding in 1908 and the latter greatly admired his eloquence in the House of Commons. As Churchill declared to a contemporary, Llewellyn Atherley-Jones,"How I wish I had his powers; speech is a painful effort to me." Cecil dissented from the beginning from Joseph Chamberlain's policy of tariff reform, pleading in Parliament against any devaluation of the idea of empire to a "gigantic profit-sharing business". He took a prominent position among the "Free Food Unionists"; consequently he was attacked by the tariff reformers, and lost his seat at Greenwich in 1906.

In 1910 Cecil became an MP for Oxford University, which he represented for the next 27 years. He immediately threw himself with passion into the struggle against the Ministerial Veto Resolutions, comparing the Asquith government to "thimble riggers". In the next year, he was active in the resistance to the Parliament Bill, treating Asquith as a "traitor" for his advice to the Crown to swamp the Conservative majority in the Lords by creating hundreds of Liberal peers, and taking a prominent part in the disturbance which prevented the Prime Minister from being heard on 24 July 1911. But he never quite regained the authority which he had possessed in the House in the early years of the century. He strongly opposed the Welsh Church Bill, and he denounced the 1914 Home Rule Bill as reducing Ireland from the status of a wife to that of a mistress — she was to be kept by John Bull, not united to him. In 1916 Cecil was part of the Mesopotamia Commission of Inquiry. He was sworn of the Privy Council on 16 January 1918.

Apart from his political career Cecil served as a Lieutenant in the Royal Flying Corps during the First World War. In that capacity, in debate in 1918, he severely censured the treatment of General Trenchard by the government.

Lord Hugh was a committed Anglican, and a member of House of Laity in the Church Assembly from 1919. He was awarded a Doctorate of Civil Law by Oxford University in 1924. He pleaded for lenient treatment of conscientious objectors, and endeavoured unsuccessfully to relieve them of disability. He left the House of Commons in 1937 because the previous year he had been appointed Provost of Eton College, a post he retained until 1944.

On 25 January 1941 he was raised to the peerage as Baron Quickswood, of Clothall in the County of Hertford. He was a Trustee of the London Library, and an honorary Doctor of Civil Law at Durham University. He was also honorary Doctor of Laws at the University of Edinburgh in 1910, and at Cambridge in 1933. From 1944 until his death he had an honorary association with New College, Oxford.

== Personal life ==
Lord Quickswood never married. He died on 10 December 1956, aged 87, at which time the barony became extinct.

== Arms ==
Coat of arms of Hugh Cecil, 1st Baron Quickswood
Escutcheon Quarterly: 1st & 4th barry of ten Argent and Azure over all six escutcheons three two and one Sable each charged with a lion rampant of the first (Cecil); 2nd & 3rd Argent on a pale Sable a conger’s head erased and erect Or charged with an ermine spot (Gascoyne); an annulet for difference. Motto Sero Sed Serio.

== Publications ==
- "Presidential Address." In Political Socialism, a Remonstrance, edited by Mark H. Judge, London: P.S. King, 1908.
- Liberty and Authority, London: Edward Arnold, 1910.
- Conservatism, London: Williams and Norgate, 1912.
- "Second Chambers in the British Dominions and in Foreign Countries." In Rights of Citizenship, Chap. VII. London: Frederick Warne & Co., 1912.
- "The Position of the Incumbent in the Parochial Church Council." In Church and State, Society for Promoting Christian Knowledge, 1916.
- "The Irish Question Again," The Living Age, Vol. XIV, No. 301, 31 May 1919
- Nationalism and Catholicism, Macmillan & Co., Limited, 1919.
- "National Instinct, the Basis of Social Institutions," Burnett House Papers, No. 9, Oxford University Press, 1926.
- The Communion Service As It Might Be, together with an Introduction and Notes. London: Humphrey Milford, 1935 (digitized by Richard Mammana).

== Sources ==
- Annan, Noel (1955). H. Plumb (ed.). "The Intellectual Aristocracy". Studies in Social History: A Tribute to G. M. Trevelyan. London: Longmans, Green & Co.
- Gardiner, A. G. (1913). "Hugh Cecil". Pillars of Society. James Nisbet & Co., Limited.
- Griffith-Boscawen, A. S. T. (1907). "Fourteen Years in Parliament". London: John Murray.
- Lucy, Henry (1917). "Lord Hugh Cecil". The Nation. CIV (2705).
- Quigley, Carroll (1981). "The Cecil Bloc: The Anglo-American Establishment: From Rhodes to Cliveden" (PDF). New York: Books in Focus.
- Rempel, Richard (May 1972). "Lord Hugh Cecil's Parliamentary Career Promise Unfulfilled". Journal of British Studies. XI.
- Rose, Kenneth (1975). The Later Cecils. London: Macmillan.

Parliament of the United Kingdom
Preceded by Sir Thomas Boord	Member of Parliament for Greenwich; 1895 – 1906	Succeeded by Richard Jackson
Preceded by Sir William Anson, Bt; John Gilbert Talbot	Member of Parliament for Oxford University; Jan. 1910 – 1937; With: Sir William Anson, Bt 1910–1914; Rowland Prothero 1914–1919; Sir Charles Oman 1919–1935; Sir A. P. Herbert 1935–1937	Succeeded by Sir A. P. Herbert; Sir Arthur Salter
Academic offices
Preceded by M. R. James	Provost of Eton; 1936–1944	Succeeded by Henry Marten
