= Peregrine Palmer =

English politician

Peregrine Palmer (6 June 1605 – 9 June 1684) was an English politician who sat as MP for Bridgwater on 7 December 1669.

He was the second son of Sir Thomas Palmer and Dorothy (nee Malet). He was educated at Christ's College, Cambridge in 1619 and Gray's Inn in 1625. He married Anne, the daughter of Nathaniel Stephens on 20 April 1654 and had three sons and three daughters, one of his sons predeceased him.

He was commissioned as a captain under the Earl of Essex in the Bishops' Wars and fought on the Royalist side under his half-brother Edward Grey in the English Civil War. In 1669, he was elected MP for Bridgwater after a disputed by-election.
