= Arthur William Edward Prothero =

Royal Navy Admiral (1850–1931)

Admiral Arthur Prothero
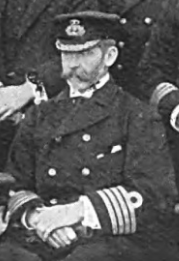
- Prothero while captain of HMS Flora, 1898
- Born: 18 April 1850; Worcester
- Died: 1 January 1931 (aged 80); Ringwood, Hampshire
- Spouse: Helen Ellicombe (m. 1894)
- Relatives: Rowland Prothero, 1st Baron Ernle (brother); Sir George Prothero (brother); Reginald Prothero (cousin)
- Military career
- Allegiance: United Kingdom
- Branch: Royal Navy
- Service years: 1863–1905
- Rank: Admiral
- Nickname: Prothero the Good
- Commands: HMS Barossa; HMS Boscawen; HMS Pearl; HMS Thames; HMS Flora; HMS Intrepid; HMS Venus; HMS Retribution; HMS Forte; HMS Arrogant; HMS Royal Oak; HMS Indus

Admiral Arthur William Edward Prothero (18 April 1850 – 1 January 1931) was an officer in the Royal Navy.

== Life ==
Born in Worcester, he was brother to Rowland and George and cousin to Vice-Admiral Reginald Charles. He joined the forces as a midshipman on 8 September 1863, gaining promotion to lieutenant just under ten years later.

Prothero was posted to HMS Superb for gunnery duties in December 1883 but at the end of the following March was transferred to HMS Carysfort to transport him to garrison duty with HMS Cygnet at Port Said. There he remained until requesting to leave Cygnet on 27 August 1885. His promotion remained slow, with commander coming on 30 June 1886 and captain on 1 January 1893.

Prothero was transferred to the shore establishment HMS Vivid to command the Devonport Fleet Reserve and be Flag Captain, Plymouth Station on 11 July 1902, a command he exercised from HMS Temeraire from 16 July that year. Promotion to rear-admiral arrived on 20 February 1905, but on 11 July that year he moved to the retired list at his own request. Whilst still on the retired list he rose to vice-admiral on 2 December 1908 and his final rank of admiral on 20 March 1913.

== Commands ==
- 21 July to 6 September 1892 - HMS Barossa
- 7 September to 31 December 1892 - HMS Boscawen
- 18 July to 22 August 1894 - HMS Pearl
- 24 July to 28 August 1895 - HMS Thames
- 12 December 1895 to 4 February 1896 - HMS Flora
- 28 April 1896 to 1 March 1897 - HMS Intrepid
- 15 June to 30 July 1897 - HMS Venus
- 14 February to 18 April 1898 - HMS Retribution
- 30 March to 15 December 1898 - HMS Forte
- 18 January 1899 to 17 January 1901 - HMS Arrogant
- 18 January 1901 to 6 June 1902 - HMS Royal Oak
- 16 July 1902 to 23 February 1905 - HMS Indus
