= George Prothero =

British historian (1848–1922)

Sir George Prothero KBE FBA
- Born: George Walter Prothero; 14 October 1848; Wiltshire, England
- Died: 10 July 1922 (aged 73)
- Writing career
- Subjects: History; biography

Sir George Walter Prothero KBE FBA (14 October 1848 – 10 July 1922) was an English historian, writer, and academic who served as president of the Royal Historical Society from 1901 to 1905.

== Life and writings ==
Prothero was born in Wiltshire to George Prothero, and was educated at Eton, studying classics at King's College, Cambridge, and at the University of Bonn. He went on to become a Fellow of King's College, working as a history lecturer there from 1876. In 1894, he became the first Professor of Modern History at the University of Edinburgh. During his time in Edinburgh he spent a year as a Council member of the local influential conservationist body, the Cockburn Association.

After five years as Professor of Modern History in Edinburgh, Prothero moved to London to take the place of his brother, Lord Ernle, as the editor of the Quarterly Review, a political periodical. He also acted as editor of the Cambridge Historical Series, a set of historical books detailing the history of several European nations and other parts of the world which were published by Cambridge University Press from 1894 onwards. With A. W. Ward and Stanley Mordaunt Leathes he edited the Cambridge Modern History between 1901 and 1912.

In 1903 he was invited to give the Rede Lecture, on which occasion he spoke on the topic of Napoleon III and the Second French Empire. In 1904–1906 he was a member of the Royal Commission for Ecclesiastical Discipline. Following the outbreak of World War I, Prothero worked as Historical Advisor to the Foreign Office, and in this capacity attended the Paris Peace Conference of 1919. For his services to the war effort, he was created Knight Commander of the Order of the British Empire in the 1920 New Year Honours.

He was married to Fanny (née Butcher), one of the 12 members of the Cambridge Ladies Dining Society.

He died in 1922.

== Selected publications ==
- The Life of Simon de Montfort, Earl of Leicester (1877)
- A Memoir of Henry Bradshaw (1888)
- Select Statutes and other Documents Illustrative of the Reigns of Elizabeth and James I (1894); 2nd edition, 1898
- The British History Reader (1898)
- Cambridge Modern History (1902–1912), co-editor
- Peace handbooks (published c. 1920), Briefing books on countries, territorial and economic questions, prepared on behalf of the Foreign Office for British negotiators at the Paris Peace Conference of 1919

== Notes ==
Academic offices
Preceded by Adolphus William Ward	President of the Royal Historical Society; 1901–1905	Succeeded by William Hunt
