= Rowland Prothero, 1st Baron Ernle =

Englishman (1851–1937) of various occupations

The Right Honourable The Lord Ernle MVO PC
- Prothero in 1920

President of the Board of Agriculture
- In office 10 December 1916 – 15 August 1919
- Monarch: George V
- Prime Minister: David Lloyd George
- Preceded by: The Earl of Crawford
- Succeeded by: The Lord Lee of Fareham

Member of Parliament for Oxford University
- In office 30 June 1914 – 11 January 1919
- Preceded by: Sir William Anson
- Succeeded by: Charles Oman

Personal details
- Born: Rowland Edmund Prothero; 6 September 1851 Clifton upon Teme, Worcestershire, England
- Died: 1 July 1937 (aged 85) West Hendred, Berkshire, England
- Resting place: Wantage, Oxfordshire, England; 51.5887°N 1.4285°W
- Party: Liberal Unionist Party (1910); Unionist (from 1914)
- Spouses: Mary Bailward (m. 1891; died 1899) Barbara Hamley (m. 1902; died 1930)
- Children: 2
- Relatives: Arthur Prothero (brother); George Prothero (brother)
- Education: Balliol College, Oxford
- Occupation: Administrator; author; barrister; journalist; politician
- Cricket career

Cricket information
- Batting: Right-handed
- Bowling: Right-arm medium

Domestic team information
- Years: Team
- 1875–1883: Hampshire

Career statistics
Competition	First-class
Matches	6
Runs scored	190
Batting average	31.66
100s/50s	1/0
Top score	110
Balls bowled	416
Wickets	10
Bowling average	18.10
5 wickets in innings	1
10 wickets in match	0
Best bowling	5/34
Catches/stumpings	7/–
- Source: Rowland Prothero at Cricinfo

Rowland Edmund Prothero, 1st Baron Ernle MVO PC (6 September 1851 — 1 July 1937) was an English agriculturalist, author, barrister, cricketer, cricket administrator, journalist, and Unionist politician. Following a brief career as a barrister after his graduation from the University of Oxford, Prothero became an author who published several works on agriculture, amongst other publication genres. His literary career largely came to an end in 1898, when he became land agent for the 11th Duke of Bedford. Prothero then moved into politics, where he represented the Conservative Party. After unsuccessfully contesting Biggleswade in the January 1910 general election, he successfully entered the House of Commons when elected unopposed as the second Member of Parliament for Oxford University in June 1914. His interest and expertise in agriculture led to him being appointed by Prime Minister David Lloyd George as President of the Board of Agriculture in December 1916, and with it a seat in the cabinet. His efforts to introduce a guaranteed price for wheat and the successful implementation of his "plough campaign" during the First World War helped to sustain the United Kingdom for the remainder of the conflict. In January 1919 he was raised to the peerage as Baron Ernle, and subsequently resigned his parliamentary seat, followed by his presidency of the Board of Agriculture in May 1919. Prothero served as president of the Marylebone Cricket Club in 1924 and 1925, having previously played first-class cricket in his youth for the Gentlemen of England and Hampshire.

== Background and education ==
Prothero was the son of the Reverend Canon George Prothero, Rector of St. Mildred's Church, Whippingham on the Isle of Wight, and his wife, Emma, only daughter of the Reverend William Money-Kyrle, of Homme House in Herefordshire. He was born on 6 September 1851 in Clifton upon Teme, Worcestershire. Amongst his four siblings were the historian Sir George Prothero and the Royal Navy admiral Arthur William Edward Prothero. Prothero was first educated at home by his mother, before proceeding at the age of 10 to board at Temple Grove School in East Sheen. However, his education at Temple Grove was interrupted by his affliction with a prolonged illness, and by the time he had fully recovered he was ready to attend Marlborough College. There it was noted by The Times that he distinguished himself more as a cricketer than he did academically, having played for the college in 1870 and 1871. From Marlborough, he matriculated to Balliol College, Oxford, where he gained a First–Class Honours degree in Modern History in 1875. Shortly after his graduation in 1875, he was elected a Fellow of All Souls' College, Oxford.

His reputation as a good cricketer followed him to Balliol, with Prothero captaining the college cricket team. Whilst he was not afforded the opportunity to play first-class cricket for Oxford University, he did make his debut in first-class cricket whilst studying at Oxford, when he appeared for the Gentlemen of England against the university at the Magdalen Ground in June 1872. He met with success in the match, taking 5 wickets for 34 runs with his medium pace bowling in Oxford's first innings, whilst in their second innings he took 3 for 44, contributing to the Gentlemen's victory by 9 wickets. During the year of his graduation, he played a first-class match for Hampshire against Sussex at Winchester, making scores of 1 not out and 24.

== Academic, legal and literary careers ==
Following his studies at Oxford, Prothero spent a year in Darmstadt in Germany to better his proficiency in German. A student of the Middle Temple, he was called to the Bar in 1878 and became a member of the Oxford Circuit. After a four-year gap, he returned to play first-class cricket in 1879 for the Gentlemen of England against Oxford University; the match would be a notable one for Prothero, with him scoring his only first-class century with 110 runs in the Gentlemen's second innings. His brief legal career came to an end in 1881, when his declining eyesight led him to give up practising law. Despite his increasingly poor eyesight, he continued to play first-class cricket for Hampshire between 1881 and 1883, making three appearances. He attempted to improve his eyesight by taking up walking, travelling the length and breadth of France on foot.

Upon his return to England, Prothero was elected Proctor of the University of Oxford in 1883, serving in that capacity under the Vice-Chancellorship of Benjamin Jowett until 1884; the pair became close friends during this time. With his eyesight having improved, he embarked on a writing career shortly after the end of his proctorship. This pursuit enabled him to control his working hours. Initially he wrote prolifically under a pseudonym, contributing articles to the Quarterly Review and the Edinburgh Review. He had a longstanding interest in agriculture, fostered by knowledge gained from farmland attached to the rectory at Whippingham. He subsequently wrote extensively on the subject, beginning in 1888 when he published The Pioneers and Progress of English Farming. He was appointed assistant editor of the literary magazine The Nineteenth Century in 1889 at the behest of its editor James Knowles, and in 1893 he became editor of the periodical Quarterly Review. He established his literary reputation in 1893, when he published the Life and Correspondence of Arthur Penrhyn Stanley, with Prothero subsequently producing a steady flow of works. In 1896, he published the previously unpublished Letters of Edward Gibbon and between 1898 and 1901 he published six volumes of the Letters and Journals of Lord Byron. He was commissioned by Queen Victoria to produce a private circulation of the Life of Prince Henry of Battenberg, which was presented to her on 24 February 1897.

However, in 1898 Prothero's literary career largely came to an end when he accepted a "handsome offer" by the 11th Duke of Bedford to become chief agent on his estate, though he continued to dedicate a few hours each day to reading and writing. In the 1901 Birthday Honours, he was appointed a Member of the Royal Victorian Order (MVO) at the discretion of Victoria; His 1888 work The Pioneers and Progress of English Farming would evolve to become English Farming Past and Present, which was hailed as a "classic" upon its publication in 1912. His autobiography, entitled From Whippingham to Westminster, would be published posthumously by the publishing house John Murray in 1938.

== Political career ==
Prothero's move into public life began in 1903, when he became chairman of the Higher Education Committee of Bedfordshire County Council, where he helped to enact the Education Act 1902. He unsuccessfully contested Biggleswade for the Liberal Unionist Party in the January 1910 general election, being defeated by the Liberal incumbent Arthur Black. Following the death of incumbent Member of Parliament (MP) for Oxford University Sir William Anson in June 1914, who was one of two MPs returned for the constituency, Prothero was stood unopposed for the Unionists as his replacement in the subsequent by-election on 30 June. His time as an MP coincided with the First World War, which began a month after his election. He on served two agricultural committees during the early years of the war, headed by Viscount Milner and the 2nd Earl of Selborne; his experiences on these committees led to the Prime Minister David Lloyd George appointing him President of the Board of Agriculture on 10 December 1916, with a seat in the cabinet and by extension being sworn to the Privy Council.

Prothero's appointment coincided with the German policy of unrestricted submarine warfare, which placed food supplies under severe threat and necessitated the need to expand agricultural production at home. He began a "plough campaign" to promote the expansion of grain and potato production on suitable grasslands, but he had to overcome several obstacles to realise this, not least convincing the public and farmers of the need for such drastic measures. He was a proponent of introducing a guaranteed price for wheat, outlining this in a letter to The Times in November 1916. Prothero was ultimately successful in bringing about its implementation via the Corn Production Act in 1917, while the "plough campaign" was successful in adding nearly 3,000,000 acres (12,000 km^{2}) of arable farmland; both are considered important achievements in helping to sustain the United Kingdom for the remainder of the war. The subsequent abandonment of Prothero's policies by the government following the war is considered one of the primary contributors toward the agricultural problems that would beset the country in the 1920s. With the resultant loss of government protections and subsidies for farmers, small farms failed, agricultural yields decreased and rural poverty increased.

In the December 1918 general election which followed a month after the cessation of hostilities, Prothero retained his Oxford University seat when he and fellow Unionist Hugh Cecil defeated the Liberal Gilbert Murray and Labour candidate Henry Sanderson Furniss. The following month on 11 January he was raised to the peerage as Baron Ernle, of Chelsea in the County of London, a title chosen in reflection of his pride in his own matrilineal descent from the Ernle family, one of the historic landed families of Wiltshire. With his elevation to the House of Lords, Prothero resigned his Oxford University seat. He remained as President of the Board of Agriculture following his appointment to the peerage. During a speech in Maidstone on 29 May 1919, he announced his resignation from the presidency, and was subsequently succeeded by The Lord Lee of Fareham.

== Later life, death and legacy ==
After his elevation to the peerage, Prothero served on the 1920–1922 Royal Commission on the Universities of Oxford and Cambridge, headed by Asquith. The purpose of the commission was to review and reform both universities in accordance with the Education Act 1918. In 1921 and 1922, he served as president of the English Association, which aimed to further the study and enjoyment of English language and literature. Prothero was elected president of the Marylebone Cricket Club in 1924, succeeding The Viscount Ullswater. His one-year term came to an end in 1925, and he was succeeded by Sir John de Robeck. He additionally held the vice-presidencies of both the Royal Literary Fund and the Land Agents' Society. His poor eyesight, which he had battled throughout his life, progressively worsened during the final years. He lived out the end of his life at Ginge Manor near West Hendred in Berkshire, where he died on 1 July 1937. His funeral took place at the Church of St Peter and St Paul in Wantage. Dame Meriel Talbot, writing in tribute to Prothero in The Times following his death, made note of his "vision and courage" during the war whilst he was president of the Board of Agriculture. Many of the agricultural measures that he introduced during the First World War to meet food demands were reintroduced during the Second World War.

== Family ==
Prothero was twice-married. He married firstly Mary Beatrice, daughter of John Bailward, in 1891. They had one son, Rowland John Prothero, and one daughter. After her death in May 1899, he married secondly Barbara Jane, daughter of Colonel Charles O. Hamley, in 1902. They had no children; she died in November 1930. His son, who served in the First World War as a lieutenant with the 7th Hussars, was killed in action during the Mesopotamian campaign. Thus, upon his own death, the barony became extinct.

== Works cited ==
- Arnold-Baker, Charles (2001). The Companion to British History (PDF) (2 ed.). London: Routledge. ISBN 978-0-415-18583-7.
- Foster, Joseph (1885). Men-at-the-bar . London: Reeves and Turner. OCLC 652330141 – via Wikisource.
- Foster, Joseph (1888–1891). Alumni Oxonienses: The Members of the University of Oxford, 1715-1886 . London: Reeves and Turner. OCLC 1088110 – via Wikisource.
- Marlborough College Register from 1843 to 1904 (5 ed.). Oxford: H. Hart. 1905. OCLC 18234600 – via Internet Archive.
- Hazlehurst, Cameron (1996). A Guide to the Papers of British Cabinet Ministers, 1900-1964. Cambridge University Press. ISBN 9780521587433 – via Internet Archive.
- Hesilrige, Arthur G. M., ed. (1939). Burke's Genealogical and Heraldic History of the Peerage, Baronetage and Knightage, Privy Council, and Order of Precedence (97 ed.). London: Burke's Peerage. OCLC 56832495.

Parliament of the United Kingdom
Preceded by Sir William Anson, Bt; Lord Hugh Cecil	Member of Parliament for Oxford University; 1914–1919; With: Lord Hugh Cecil	Succeeded by Lord Hugh Cecil; Sir Charles Oman
Political offices
Preceded by The Earl of Crawford	President of the Board of Agriculture; 1916–1919	Succeeded by The Lord Lee of Fareham as Minister of Agriculture and Fisheries
Peerage of the United Kingdom
New creation	Baron Ernle; 1919–1937	Extinct
