= Newdigate (surname) =

Newdigate (also spelled Newdegate) is a surname of English origin.

Notable people with the name Newdigate include:

- John Newdigate (1600–1642), English politician
- Roger Newdigate (1719–1806), English politician and collector of antiquities
- Sir Richard Newdigate, 1st Baronet (1602–1678), MP for Tamworth, 1660
- Sir Richard Newdigate, 2nd Baronet (1644–1710), MP for Warwickshire, 1681–85 and 1689–90
- Richard Newdigate (1679–1745), MP for Newark-on-Trent, 1710–15
- Sebastian Newdigate (1500–1535), Carthusian monk

Notable people with the name Newdegate include:

- Charles Newdigate Newdegate (1816–1887), British politician
- Edward Newdegate (1825–1902), British general
- Francis Newdegate (1862–1936), British Conservative politician, Governor of Tasmania and Western Australia
- Francis FitzRoy Newdegate, 3rd Viscount Daventry (1921–2000), British peer

== See also ==
- Newdigate baronets
- Newdegate (disambiguation)
