= Richard Newdigate =

Richard Newdigate may refer to:

- Sir Richard Newdigate, 1st Baronet (1602–1678), MP for Tamworth 1660
- Sir Richard Newdigate, 2nd Baronet (1644–1710), MP for Warwickshire 1681–85, 1689–90
- Richard Newdigate (1679–1745), MP for Newark 1710–15

== See also ==
- Newdigate (surname)
- Newdigate, a village in Surrey
