= John Tunstall (usher) =

Usher of Queen Anne of Denmark

John Tunstall or Tonstal (died 1651) was a servant and gentleman-usher to Anne of Denmark, wife of James VI and I in England, and Henrietta Maria, wife of Charles I.

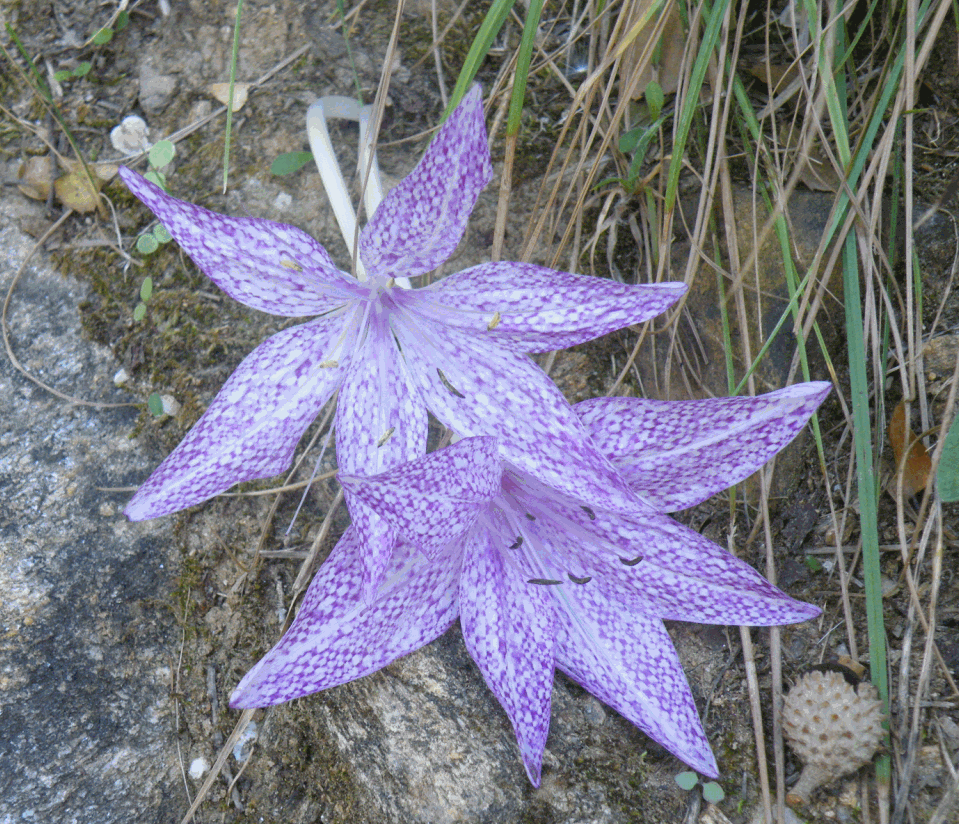
John Tunstall grew Colchicum variegatum in his Croydon garden

== Career ==
As an usher, Tunstall's duties including preparing royal lodgings and making ready court spaces for ceremonies and entertainments. In the summer of 1614, with eight helpers, he prepared rooms at Somerset House for the performance of plays. The occasion is thought to have been the visit of Christian IV, brother of Anne of Denmark.

In the summer of 1615 Anne of Denmark visited Bath twice for her health to bathe in the warm spring water. John Tunstall was later paid £105-10s-9d for fitting up her lodging in Bath and some expenses of her journeys.

In February 1618, Tunstall was sent to the Lady Elizabeth, Electress Palatine in Heidelberg. He carried a gift of £100 for her nurses and midwives, following the birth of Charles Louis.

Tunstal was knighted on 13 July 1619 at Theobalds. His main residence was then at Carshalton. He served as an usher to Henrietta Maria, as did Francis Constable and Timothy Pinkney, two of the quarter waiter ushers who had served Anne of Denmark.

Tunstall helped organise the performance of a masque Gargantua and Gargamella at Somerset House, then known as Denmark House, to celebrate the birthday of Henrietta Maria, on 16 November 1626. In the performance, the court dwarf Jeffrey Hudson fenced with a giant, the Welsh porter William Evans.

Tunstall had a house at Edgcome or Edgecombe (later Addiscombe) by Croydon, and the flowers he grew for Henrietta Maria, including Colchicum variegatum and Myosotis arvensis were mentioned and illustrated by the botanists John Gerard and John Parkinson. His gardener sent supplies to John Newdigate, who had a house at Croydon and a portrait of Tunstall. In the 1630s he objected to commissioners taking saltpetre from his pigeon-house or dovecote for making gunpowder and had it demolished.

== Tunstall and the Newdigate family ==
John Tunstall married Penelope Leveson (died 1652), a daughter of Walter Leveson of Lilleshall in Shropshire. and a sister of the vice-admiral Richard Leveson (died 1605). Penelope Leveson was a cousin of the Fittons and Newdigate families. Their children included a son, Henry Tunstall, and a daughter, Diana Tunstall, who was baptised at Croydon on 14 February 1624. A son John died in 1623, and a daughter Penelope died in 1637.

Tunstall was a godparent to the children of Anne Newdigate, and may have arranged an invitation for her and daughter Mary Newdigate (1598-1643), to attend a masque at court in January 1617, probably The Vision of Delight. Mary Newdigate later married Edmund Bolton, whose sister may have been the Elizabeth Bolton who took part in Robert White's Masque of Cupid's Banishment at Ladies Hall, Deptford. One of Anne Newdigate's daughters, Lettice Newdigate (1604-1625), attended the Ladies Hall school in 1620 (or a school in Deptford). Her portrait, aged 2, at Arbury Hall, includes one of the earliest depictions of an English knot garden.

Tuntall was a godfather to Lettice or Anne Bolton, daughters of Edward Bolton and Mary Newdigate. In May 1621 he was a witness to the marriage settlement of Susan Lulls, the daughter of a court goldsmith Arnold Lulls to John Newdigate (1600-1643). Tunstall may have made an introduction between the apparently wealthy goldsmith and a gentry family in some financial difficulty.
