= Arbury Canals =

Canals in Warwickshire, England

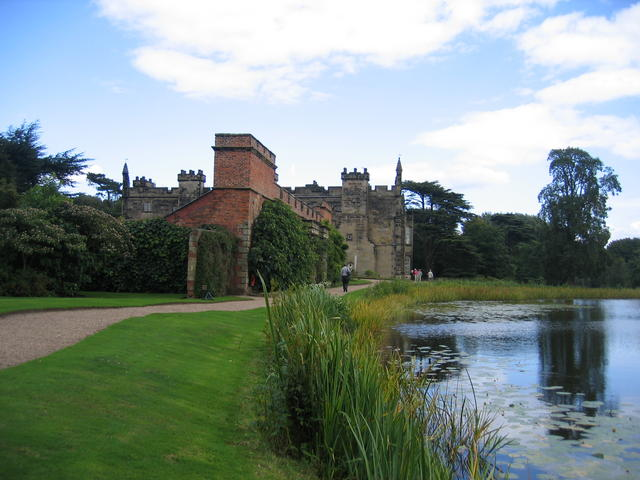
- Arbury Hall, with the Hall Pool in the foreground

Specifications
- Locks: 13
- Status: defunct

History
- Principal engineer: William Bean
- Date of first use: 1764
- Date completed: 1795
- Date closed: 1819 and 1962

Geography
- Start point: Seeswood Pool
- Connects to: Coventry Canal

The Arbury Canals were a system of private canals, in the Arbury Estate, between Nuneaton and Bedworth in Warwickshire, England. They connected with the Coventry Canal. They were built by Sir Roger Newdigate between 1764 and 1795, and ceased to be used soon after his death in 1806. The Griff Hollows Canal was separate to the main system, and carried coal until its closure in 1961.

== Geography ==
The Arbury Canals consisted of seven sections of canal, which were individually named. The Griff Hollows Canal, which was not physically connected to the other six, linked the colliery at Griff to the Coventry Canal.

About one mile to the south, the main system of canals connected the Coventry Canal to the Arbury Estate, and were used to transport coal and carry produce around the estate. Both canals gained water from Seaswood Pool, just northeast of the village of Astley.

There were several branches from the main line including the Seeswood Canal which linked to Seeswood Pool, and a short branch to Hall Pool, one of the pools on the estate where water was stored.

The entire system was approximately 6 miles (9.7 km) long, and included thirteen locks, each 40 by 6 feet (12.2 by 1.8 metres). One unusual feature was the Triple Lock, which had a Y-shaped chamber, with two separate entrances from above, leading to different branches.

== History ==
Coal was found on the Arbury estate, owned by the Newdigate family, at the beginning of the eighteenth century. Sir Richard Newdigate, the 3rd Baronet, was keen to exploit these resources. He was responsible for the introduction of Newcomen atmospheric engines, which were used to drain the mines, the first being installed in 1716. Its success was put down to luck by Desaguliers, writing in 1744, who stated that the use of condensation water had been discovered by accident, and that the valve gear, which made the machine self-acting, had been built from catches and strings by Humphrey Potter, a young lad whose job was to mind it. Whether this account was true is unknown, but it was self-acting in 1817, when Henry Beighton studied it and published a detailed engraving of the engine.

Sir Richard also constructed three "boatways" between 1700 and 1711, which were small canals used to convey coal from the outlying pits. His son, Sir Roger Newdigate, the 5th baronet, would incorporate these into a larger system. Sir Roger, who was a Member of Parliament and became the owner of Arbury Hall on the early death of his brother, was a canal enthusiast. His interest may have stemmed from his involvement with the Bridgewater Canal, where he acted as counsel for their bill to authorise an extension to the River Mersey. He started constructing canals on his estate in 1764, and by 1795 there were about 5.5 miles (8.9 km) of waterways. William Bean from Derbyshire acted as engineer, assisted by the mason and bricklayer from the Arbury estate, John Morris.

The Communication Canal was constructed to link a wharf near a worsted factory to the Coventry Canal. The channel and junction were excavated in 1771, although the canal was not finished until 1773. It was 1,078 yards (986 m) long, and included a stop lock close to the junction with the Coventry Canal. This was eventually connected to the Arbury Lower Canal or Griff Canal, most of which was in use by 1771. A new branch was built to connect the Griff Canal to the road running from Arbury to the main turnpike road in 1793. The wharf at its terminus was also served by a tramway connecting it to coal pits. The connection between the two canals was made in 1794, when a staircase of four locks and another of two were completed. The branch to the wharf crossed the locks on an aqueduct, to maintain a link to the worsted factory. The canal was 1,540 yards (1,410 m) long, and had a feeder running from Kenilworth Pool.

The next section was called the Coventry Wood Canal, and was operational by 1771. Locks to connect it to the Griff Canal and the Arbury High Level Canal were completed in 1772, and it was 528 yards (483 m) long. The next section, the Arbury High Level Canal, was the earliest, as it was used for boating in 1764, and was surveyed in that year, to establish how it could be incorporated into a larger system. It was linked to the Garden Pool in 1773 by a lock, and boats could reach Hall Pool two years later, when a staircase of two locks and a single lock were built. This canal was 2,505 yards (2,291 m) long.

Water for the canals was originally supplied by a feeder from Seeswood Lake, but in 1777, this was enlarged to make it navigable, and in 1784 another lock was built to give access from the canal into the lake. When completed, the Seeswood Canal was 1,980 yards (1,810 m) long. The final part of the estate canals was the Coton Lawn Canal, which ran for 2,112 yards (1,931 m) from the Arbury High Level Canal to a wharf on North Walk, passing through Spring Kidden Wood on its way. It was completed in 1795.

Sir Roger also built tramways on his estate. The first connected some pits to the old wharf, but was largely redundant once the Collycroft locks were constructed. The second connected the new wharf on the main canal system to Griff Hollows wharf on the Griff Hollows Canal. It was opened on 29 July 1787, but was superseded by a double-track tramway on a slightly different route in 1793. Few other details have survived, and it is likely that they ceased operation at the same time as the canals did.

=== Decline ===
After Newdigate's death in 1806, at the age of 88, the estate system continued to be used until 1812, but then it gradually became disused, and by 1819 the upper levels were no longer navigable. From that date the locks were replaced by weirs, and only the Communication Canal linking directly with the Coventry Canal remained navigable. Despite the decline, the canals and reservoirs were inspected by the canal engineer Benjamin Bevan in 1815 and 1817, and informed his suggestion that the unfinished Grand Western Canal could be linked to Taunton by a narrow canal, which he made in 1818. The following year he assisted Newdigate's successor after claims were made that too much water was flowing from the canals into the Coventry Communication Canal.

Today a few remains of the canal remain visible within the Arbury Estate. A number of original plans of the system are held by the Warwickshire County Record Office. Arbury Mill, which had an undershot wheel and was fed from the canal, is a grade II listed building, and may have been the inspiration for George Eliot's The Mill on the Floss.

=== Griff Hollows Canal ===
The Griff Hollows Canal was quite separate to the main system. Designed to carry coal to the Coventry Canal from the Griff Hollows wharf, which was connected to collieries by a tramroad, construction began in 1785, and it was opened on 29 July 1787. It was 1,320 yards (1,210 m) long, and was all on one level. It remained in commercial use until the colliery closed in 1961. It continued to be navigable until 1973, when it was severed by the construction of the A444 road. The entrance can still be seen, and it still supplies water to the Coventry Canal.

Griff Hollows was the inspiration for George Eliot's "Red Deeps" in The Mill on the Floss, while the canal was probably the inspiration for her Brown Canal in the autobiographical sonnet Brother and Sister.

The wide-arched bridge, the scented elder-flowers,
The wondrous watery rings that died too soon,
The echoes of the quarry, the still hours
With white robe sweeping-on the shadeless noon,
Were but my growing self, are part of me,
My present Past, my root of piety.

The route of the canal is owned by Nuneaton and Bedworth Borough Council. It has been infilled, and acts as a green corridor through an area of housing, industrial warehousing, and commercial buildings. The basin at the far end is still in water, and is known as Bermuda Lake. After a suggestion by a local boater called Alan Baxter in 2018, the council formed a Griff Arm Canal Review Working Group, to review the future of the canal, and whether it could be returned to use. Although it is crossed by the A444 road, there is sufficient room for the canal to pass beneath the road, so restoration is at least feasible.

== Points of interest ==
Point	Coordinates (Links to map resources)	OS Grid Ref	Notes
Seeswood Pool	52.5129°N 1.5192°W	SP327906	
Seeswood Canal	52.5077°N 1.5159°W	SP329900	
Triple lock	52.5021°N 1.5096°W	SP333894	
Hall Pool	52.4993°N 1.5087°W	SP334891	
Coton Lawn Canal terminus	52.5094°N 1.5083°W	SP334902	
Coton Lawn Canal	52.5022°N 1.5023°W	SP338894	
Coventry Wood lock	52.4939°N 1.4944°W	SP344885	
Arbury Low Level canal	52.4926°N 1.4853°W	SP350884	
Bedworth locks	52.4913°N 1.4767°W	SP356882	
Coventry Communication Canal	52.4915°N 1.4698°W	SP360883	
Jn with Coventry Canal	52.4908°N 1.4639°W	SP364882	
Griff Hollows Canal	52.5025°N 1.4630°W	SP365895	Jn with Coventry Canal
Griff Hollows Wharf	52.5031°N 1.4766°W	SP356895	
