= Sir Richard Newdigate, 3rd Baronet =

English landowner (1668–1727)

Sir Richard Newdigate, 3rd Baronet (29 April 1668 – 22 July 1727) was an English landowner.

== Early life ==
Newdigate was born on 29 April 1668. He was the eldest of two sons and seven daughters born to Sir Richard Newdigate, 2nd Baronet and Mary Bagot. His father, a Gentleman of the Privy Chamber, served as MP for Warwickshire.

His paternal grandparents were Sir Richard Newdigate, 1st Baronet and Juliana Leigh (daughter of Sir Francis Leigh of King's Newnham). His maternal grandparents were Sir Edward Bagot, 2nd Baronet of Blithefield and Mary (née Lambard) Crawley (widow of John Crawley of Someries, Bedfordshire and daughter of William Lambard of Buckingham).

He was educated at Christ Church, Oxford, matriculating in November 1685.

== Career ==
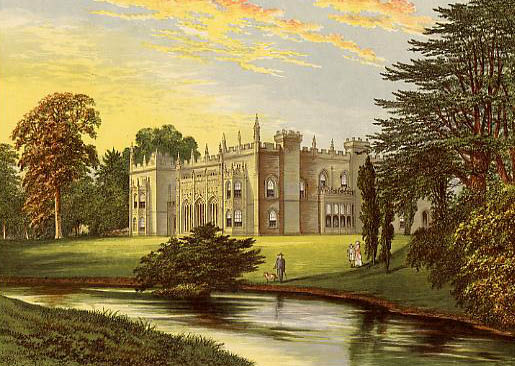
Painting of Arbury Hall, 1879

Upon the death of his father on 4 January 1710, with whom he was said to have a terrible relationship (his father described him in his will as "my most inveterate and implacable enemy"), he succeeded as the 3rd Baronet Newdigate, of Arbury. He inherited the estates of Arbury and of Harefield in Middlesex together all of his father's considerable debts. Coal was found on the Arbury estate in the early 1700s and he introduced Newcomen atmospheric engines in 1716. His son, the 5th Baronet, later expanded the production greatly.

In 1712 he was appointed a trustee of Rugby School.

== Personal life ==
On 17 June 1704 Newdigate was married to Elizabeth Twisden (1681–1765) at East Malling, Kent. Elizabeth was a daughter of Sir Roger Twisden, 2nd Baronet, MP for Rochester, and Margaret Marsham (a daughter of Sir John Marsham). Together, they were the parents of at least eleven children, including:

- Elizabeth Newdigate (1703–1769), who married Hon. John Chichester, second son of Arthur Chichester, 3rd Earl of Donegall and Lady Catherine Forbes (a daughter of the 1st Earl of Granard), in 1726.
- Richard Newdigate (1705–1706), who died young.
- John Newdigate (1707–1709), who died young.
- Mary Newdigate (1709–1744), who married Charles Palmer of Ladbroke Hall in 1733.
- Juliana Newdigate (1711–1780), who married John Bracebridge Ludford of Ansley Hall, in 1733.
- Sir Edward Newdigate, 4th Baronet (1716–1732), who was educated at Westminster School and University College, Oxford before his unexpected death.
- Sir Roger Newdigate, 5th Baronet (1719–1806), who married Sophia Conyers, daughter of Edward Conyers, in 1743. After her death, he married Hesther Margaret Munday, a daughter Edward Mundy of Shipley Hall and sister to Edward Miller Mundy, in 1776.

Sir Richard died at Arbury on 22 July 1727 and was buried at St Mary the Virgin Church, Harefield, of which his family was patron. He was succeeded by his eldest surviving son, Edward. As Edward died without issue in 1732, the baronetcy passed to Richard's second son, Roger, who also died without issue in 1806 at which time the baronetcy became extinct. Arbury Hall and Harefield passed to Francis Parker of Kirk Hallam, Derbyshire, a distant cousin of the 5th Baronet, who then adopted the additional name of Newdigate. Francis moved into Arbury Hall and married Lady Barbara Maria Legge (a daughter of the 3rd Earl of Dartmouth), in 1820.

=== Descendants ===
Through his daughter Juliana, he was a grandfather of John Newdigate Ludford, who married Elizabeth Boswell (parents of Elizabeth Juliana Bracebridge Ludford, wife of Sir John Newdigate-Ludford-Chetwode, 5th Baronet).

Through his daughter Elizabeth, he was a grandfather of Arthur Chichester, 5th Earl of Donegall (created 1st Marquess of Donegall in the Peerage of Ireland in 1791), who married Lady Anne Hamilton (a daughter of the 5th Duke of Hamilton).

== Bibliography ==
- Howard, Joseph Jackson; Crisp, Frederick Arthur, eds. (1899). Visitation of England and Wales. Vol. 7. London: Priv. printed. p. 53.

Baronetage of England
Preceded by Richard Newdigate	Baronet (of Arbury); 1710–1727	Succeeded by Edward Newdigate
