= Anne Newdigate (1574–1618) =

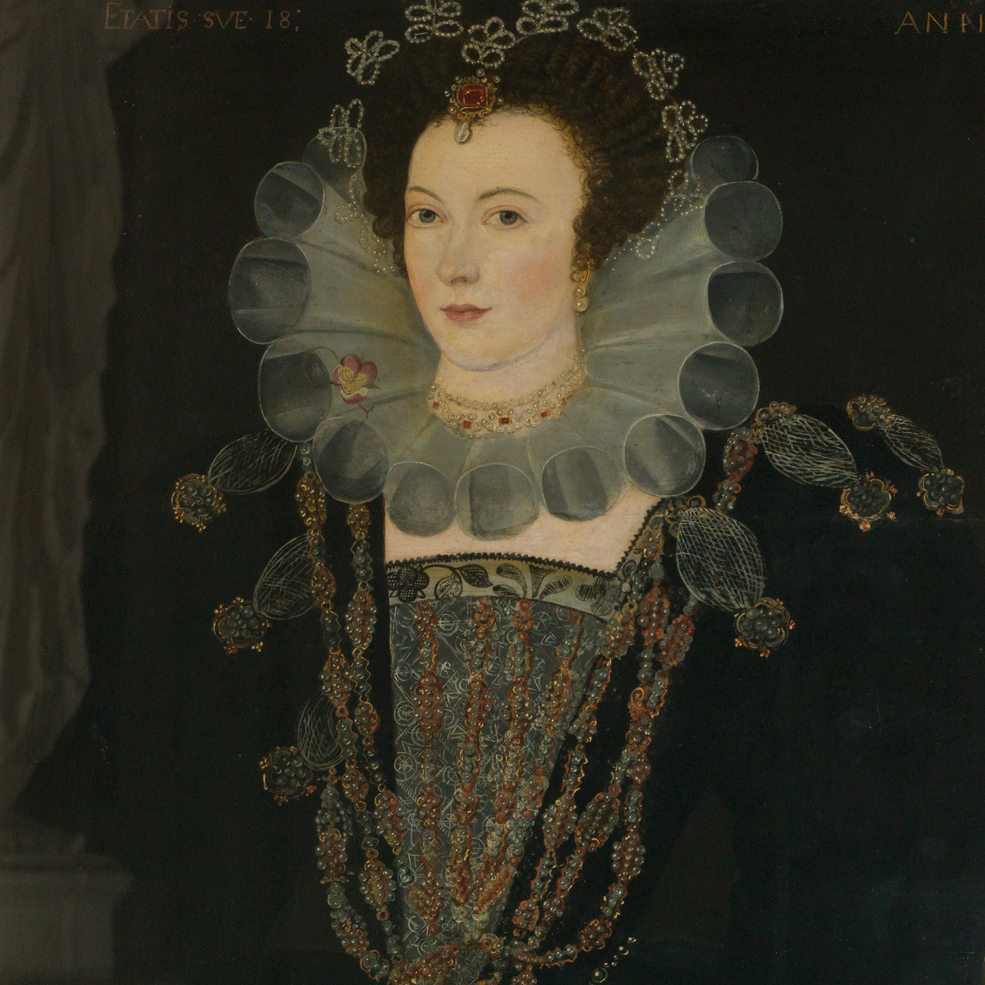
- Anne Newdigate in 1592
- Born: 1574
- Died: 1618 (aged 43–44)
- Known for: Correspondence
- Children: 5

Anne Newdigate (née Fitton; 1574 – 1618) was a gentlewoman and letter writer. Many of her letters have survived including those concerning her scandalous sister Mary Fitton which help to explain whether Mary was Shakespeare's "Dark Lady".

== Life ==
Anne Fitton was the daughter of Lady Alice and Sir Edward Fitton. She learnt how to write and she married John Newdigate when he was sixteen and she was twelve. This was before he went to Brasenose College. They had impressive relatives but their finances were never up to their ambitions. Anne is credited with keeping their finances solvent.

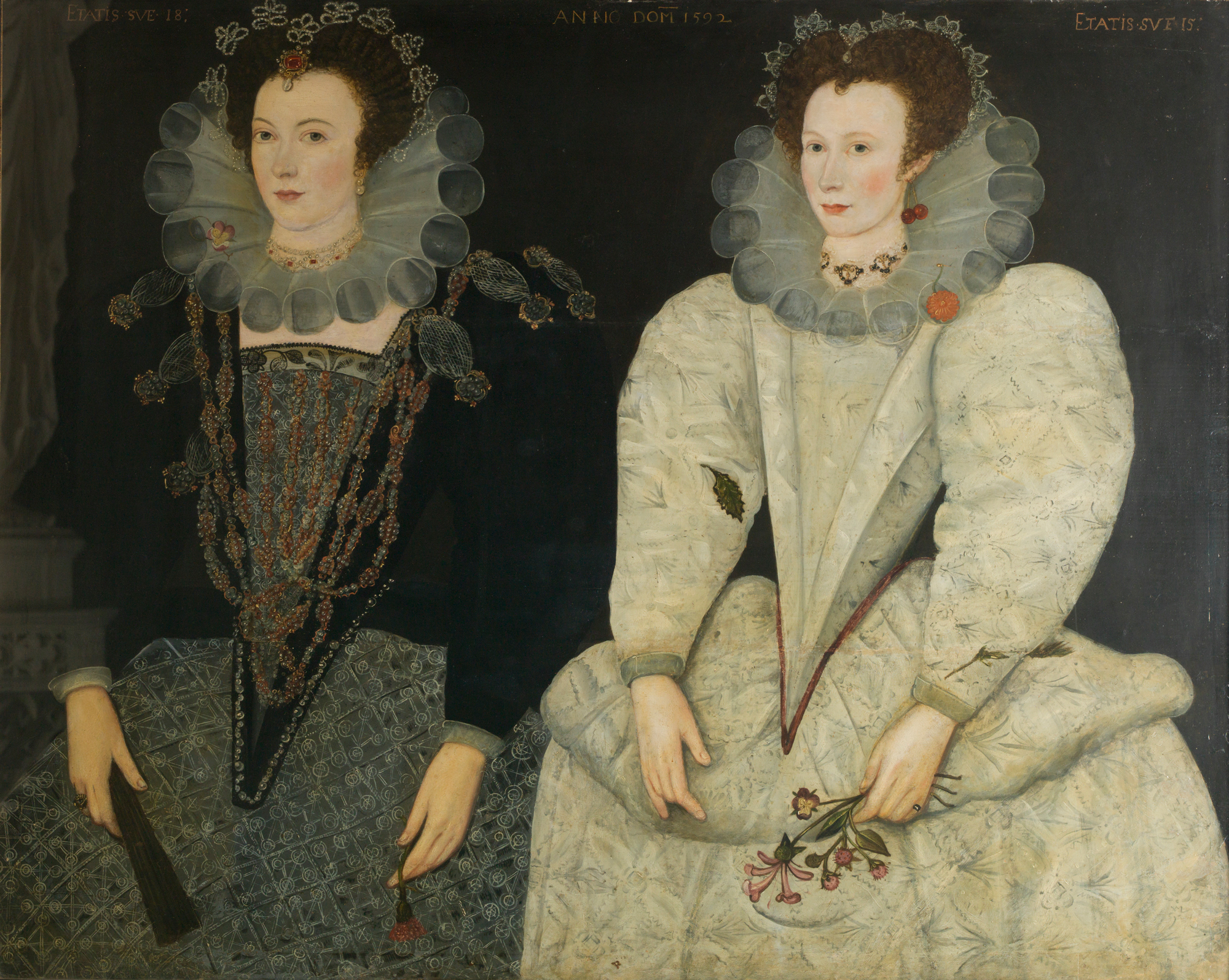
Double portrait by unknown artist of Anne Newdigate and Mary Fitton in 1592

For many years they lived on her father's money, especially whilst her husband was at college where she lived at her parents house. In 1592 she and her sister Mary Fitton sat for an oil painting together. In 1595 the couple moved to a house that her father in law had bought in the 1580s. They lived at Arbury Hall near Nuneaton with an income of 300 to 400 pounds a year.

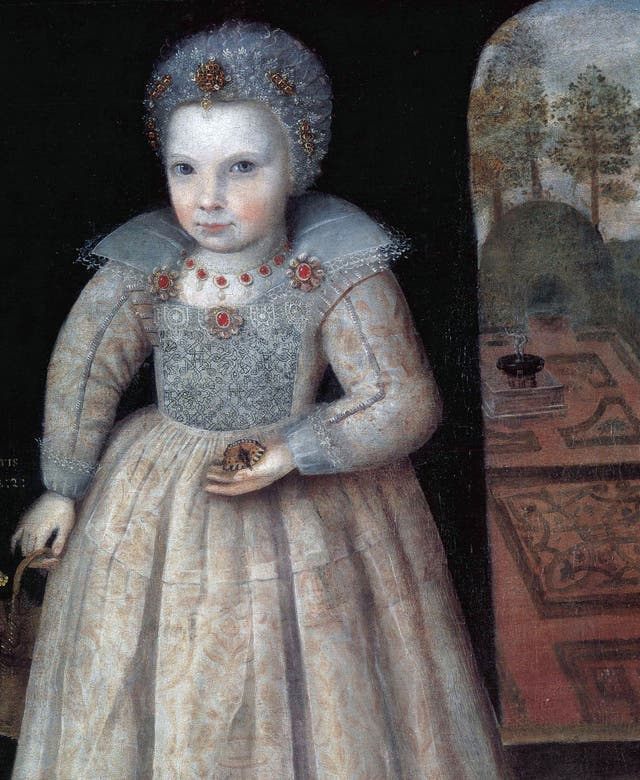
Lettice Newdigate aged two with Knot garden design on her bodice and to the right.

Anne Newdigate had five children of which the eldest was Mary (1598–1643). The eldest son John Newdigate (1600–1642) was his father's heir, the next Richard Newdigate (1602–1678). The last two were daughters - Lettice (1604–1625), and Anne (1607–1637). Lettice attended the Ladies Hall school at Deptford from July 1617. Her portrait, aged 2, now at Arbury Hall, includes one of the earliest depictions of an English knot garden. Anne could have been excluded from society after moving to Arbury but she was a keen correspondent. Her family connections included: Sir William Knollys who was the Earl of Bedford and the Lord Chamberlain of the Household), Vice Admiral Sir Richard Leveson; Sir John Tonstal who was an usher to Anne of Denmark; Lettice, Lady Paget; and Elizabeth, Lady Grey. All of these were godparents to her children.

At the Union of Crowns in 1603, James VI and I and Anne of Denmark travelled to London, and aristocrats and gentry were keen to meet them on the way. Anne Newdigate noted that they would come to Coventry and Althorp. Francis Fitton wrote to her mentioning a delay to the queen's journey, caused by a miscarriage, "the Queene hathe had lately some myshapp, which is not to be spoken". It is not known if Anne Newdigate travelled to meet the queen, or went to London when her husband was knighted in July 1603.

William Knollys was godparent to her daughter who was named Mary. Knollys was besotted with Anne's sister Mary and he wrote several letters to Anne explaining his interest. Knollys was not only married but he had agreed to serve as a protector to Anne when she went to court and he broke that trust.

Anne's account books and the letters she wrote reveal her role as the financial manager and the respect that she was given by her peers. Francis Beaumont of Bedworth noted her skills as a correspondent and she exchanged news and views with Lady Lucy Percy; Sir Fulke Greville, Lady Margaret Hoby; Lady Grey; and Elizabeth and Lady Ashburnham. Her sister Mary was at the centre of court gossip in her unwanted attentions of Knollys and her sister's lover Sir Richard Leveson and another of Anne's children's godparent's manoeuvred on Anne's behalf. He tried unsuccessfully to get Anne the position of Royal wet-nurse to Princess Mary.

Anne became a widow in 1610 and his will made ample provisions for his children but at the risk of leaving his wife and estate without an income. There was even a possibility that she might lose the custody of her children but her letter writing saved her son. Sir Robert Cecil who was the master of the wards commented that her letter was "passionate and moving" and she saw off competitive claims from the Harringtons of Coombe Abbey. She increased her income from her estate aided by William Whitehall who had worked for them since he was at college with her husband. She rejected proposals for her own second marriage and directed her efforts at arranging the marriages of her daughter Mary and her son John. She reached out for advice and support from influential and family contacts. Sir John Tunstall, another of chosen god parents, was to arrange for Anne and her daughter Mary to attend a Royal masque, probably The Vision of Delight, in January 1617. She became ill and returned later that year to Warwickshire where she died in the following June. William Whitehall continued his service to the family.

Her son John Newdigate gained his majority in 1621 and married Susannah Lulls (1597-1654), daughter of the court jeweller Arnold Lulls. There was a court case about the payment of her dowry.
