= Newdigate (disambiguation) =

Newdigate is a village and civil parish in Surrey, England.

Newdigate or Newdegate may also refer to:

- Newdigate (surname), for people with that name (both spellings)
- Newdigate Prize, a prize for English verse awarded to University of Oxford students
- Newdigate baronets, a Baronetage of England
- Newdegate, Western Australia, a town
- Electoral division of Newdegate, an electoral division in the Tasmanian Legislative Council of Australia

== See also ==
- Newdigate-Reed House, near Maysville, Kentucky
