= Arthur Chichester, 3rd Earl of Donegall =

English Army officer and peer

The Right Honourable The Earl of Donegall
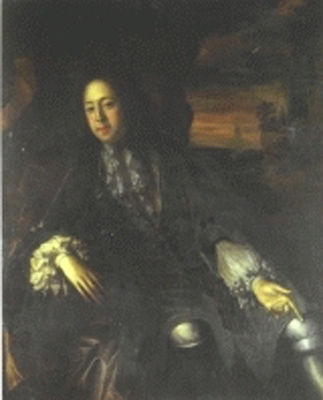
- c. 1690 portrait of Donegall by Garret Morphy

Colonel of the Earl of Donegall's Regiment of Foot
- In office 1701–1706
- Preceded by: Office created
- Succeeded by: Richard Gorges

Personal details
- Born: Arthur Chichester; 1666
- Died: 10 April 1706 (aged 39–40) Montjuich, Spain
- Spouse(s): Lady Barbara Boyle (died 1682); Lady Catherine Forbes
- Children: 8
- Parent(s): Arthur Chichester, 2nd Earl of Donegall; Jane Itchingham

Plaque in Donegal Place Belfast - Arthur Chichester, Royal Sussex Regiment

Major-General Arthur Chichester, 3rd Earl of Donegall (1666 – 10 April 1706), was an English Army officer and peer.

== Early life ==
He was the eldest son of Arthur Chichester, 2nd Earl of Donegall, and Jane Itchingham (c. 1645–1712). Among his siblings were Lady Jane Chichester (wife of Dacre Barrett) and Lady Mary Chichester (wife of Sir Robert Newcomen, 6th Baronet). His father served as Custos Rotulorum for County Antrim and Governor of Carrickfergus for twelve years before dying in Ireland in 1678. After his father's death, his mother married Richard Rooth of Epsom, son of Sir Richard Rooth, with whom she had two more daughters. (Note: After his mother's death in 1712, Rooth married Mary Grey, Countess of Tankerville (née Lady Mary Berkeley), the daughter of George Berkeley, 1st Earl of Berkeley, and widow of Ford Grey, 1st Earl of Tankerville.)

His father was the eldest son of Lady Mary Jones and Lt.Col. John Chichester, who was MP for Dungannon and fought in the English Civil War. After his grandfather's death, his grandmother married Col. Christopher Copley of Wadworth. His maternal grandparents were Sarah (née Loftus) Itchingham and John Itchingham of Dunbrody, County Wexford.

== Career ==
Having succeeded his father as Earl of Donegall in 1678, (Note: His father, the 2nd Earl, had succeeded to the titles in 1675 under the special remainder granted with it to the male heirs of his grandfather, Edward Chichester, 1st Viscount Chichester.) he refused to attend the Irish Parliament called by James II in May 1689, but later sat in the Parliament called by William III in October 1692.

=== Military career ===
Having made a career in the English Army, Lord Donegall founded the 35th Regiment of Foot in Belfast in 1701, becoming its first Colonel. In 1704 he accompanied the regiment to fight in the War of the Spanish Succession in Spain, and was appointed major general of Spanish forces. He was killed in action in 1706 at Fort Montjuich near Barcelona, and was buried in that city.

== Personal life ==
Sometime before 1682, he married Lady Barbara Boyle, a daughter of Roger Boyle, 1st Earl of Orrery, and Lady Margaret Howard (a daughter of the 2nd Earl of Suffolk). Lady Donegall died on 16 November 1682 without surviving issue.

After her death, he married Lady Catherine Forbes (d. 1743), daughter of Arthur Forbes, 1st Earl of Granard, and Catherine Newcomen (a daughter of Sir Robert Newcomen), on 27 July 1685. Together, they were the parents of:

- Arthur Chichester, 4th Earl of Donegall (1695–1757), who married Lady Lucy Ridgeway, daughter of Robert Ridgeway, 4th Earl of Londonderry, in 1716.
- Hon. John Chichester (1700–1746), who married Elizabeth Newdigate, daughter of Sir Richard Newdigate, 3rd Baronet, in 1726.
- Lady Anne Chichester (d. 1753), who married Lt.-Gen. James Barry, 4th Earl of Barrymore, son of Richard Barry, 2nd Earl of Barrymore, in 1716.
- Lady Katherine Chichester (d. 1749), who married Clotworthy Skeffington, 4th Viscount Massereene, son of Clotworthy Skeffington, 3rd Viscount Massereene, in 1713.
- Lady Jane Chichester, who died in a fire at her father's house.
- Lady Frances Chichester, who also died in a fire at her father's house.
- Lady Henrietta Chichester, who also died in a fire at her father's house.
- Lady Mary Chichester, who died unmarried.

Lord Donegall died on 10 April 1706 and was succeeded by his eldest son, Arthur. His widow, the dowager Lady Donegall, died on 15 June 1743. After the 4th Earl died without issue in 1757, the title passed to his nephew (the 3rd Earl's grandson), Arthur, who was created Baron Fisherwick in the Peerage of Great Britain in 1790 and Marquess of Donegall in the Peerage of Ireland on 4 July 1791.

Military offices
New regiment	Colonel of the Earl of Donegall's; Regiment of Foot; 1701–1706	Succeeded by Richard Gorges
Peerage of Ireland
Preceded by Arthur Chichester	Earl of Donegall; 1678–1706	Succeeded by Arthur Chichester
Preceded by Arthur Chichester	Viscount Chichester; 1678–1706	Succeeded by Arthur Chichester
Preceded by Arthur Chichester	Baron Chichester; 2nd creation 1678–1706	Succeeded by Arthur Chichester
