= Muriel FitzRoy, 1st Viscountess Daventry =

British aristocrat (1869–1962)

Muriel FitzRoy, 1st Viscountess Daventry CBE (8 August 1869 – 8 July 1962) was a British aristocrat and the wife of Edward FitzRoy, who was Speaker of the House of Commons from 1928 until his death in 1943.

== Biography ==
Lady Daventry was born Muriel Douglas-Pennant, elder daughter of Lt Col Hon Archibald Charles Henry Douglas-Pennant, second son of Edward Douglas-Pennant, 1st Baron Penrhyn.

On 6 May 1943, just over two months after the death of her husband, she was created Viscountess Daventry, of Daventry in the County of Northampton, a viscountcy being the customary retirement honour for Speakers. To date, she was the last peeress to be granted an hereditary peerage.

Edward Fitzroy and Lady Daventry had four children:

- Robert Oliver Fitzroy, 2nd Viscount Daventry (born 10 January 1893, died 7 May 1976)
- The Hon. Nancy Jean Fitzroy (born 31 May 1894, died Feb 1984)
- Captain Michael Algernon Fitzroy (born 27 June 1895, killed in action 15 April 1915)
- Commander the Hon. John Maurice FitzRoy Newdegate (born 20 March 1897, died 1976), father of Francis FitzRoy Newdegate, 3rd Viscount Daventry

Coat of arms of Muriel FitzRoy, 1st Viscountess Daventry
Escutcheon Quarterly 1st & 4th per bend sinister Ermine and Ermines a lion rampant Or a canton sable for distinction (Pennant), 2nd & 3rd grand quarters quarterly 1st & 4th Argent a man’s heart Gules ensigned with an Imperial crown Proper on a chief Azure three mullets of the field 2nd & 3rd Argent three piles Gules on the two outer ones a mullet of the field (Douglas)

Peerage of the United Kingdom
New creation	Viscountess Daventry; 1943–1962	Succeeded by Robert Oliver FitzRoy
