= Ralph de Sudeley =

English baron in Gloucestershire (1133–1192)

Sir Ralph de Sudeley of Sudeley Castle
- Born: 1133; Sudeley Castle, Winchcombe, Gloucestershire, England
- Died: 1192 (aged 58–59); Griff Manor, Griff, Warwickshire, England
- Resting place: Winchcombe Abbey, Winchcombe, Gloucestershire
- Spouse: Emma de Beauchamp
- Children: Otuel de Sudeley; Ralph de Sudeley
- Parents: John de Sudeley; Grace de Tracy

Ralph de Sudeley (1133–1192) was an English baron in Gloucestershire. He was a benefactor of the Knights Templar as well as religious establishments. He was succeeded by his son Otuel. From 1185 the family was based at Griff, Warwickshire, near land at Chilvers Coton given to Arbury Priory and the Templars.

== Biography ==
Born in 1133 at Sudeley Castle in Gloucestershire, England, Ralph de Sudeley died at Griff, Warwickshire, England in 1192.

Ralph De Sudeley was the son of Baron John de Sudeley (1090-1140) and Grace de Traci (c. 1100-?). His younger brother was the more famous William de Tracy, one of the three conspirators of the murder of Thomas Becket, Archbishop of Canterbury.

“When the Knights Templar order was founded in France in the early 1100s, its members were French Cistercian monks who vowed to fight for Christianity in the Holy Land. Within fifty years, however, men from other European countries such as Germany and England joined the ranks, and many of these were far from being monks. Most were either professional soldiers or simply adventurers whose motives were a combination of glory and greed. (Rich pickings were to be had from plundering the Moslem population of the Middle East.) Although the Knights Templar order still considered itself to be an army of holy warriors, by the 1180s it was more like an early version of the Foreign Legion: an international militia under French control that made up its numbers with mercenaries and adventurers. One such adventurer was Ralph de Sudeley, the leader of the Templars who apparently found the treasure at Jebel Madhbah in the 1180s. He was a wealthy English knight who joined the Templars in the Holy Land in 1182, and in 1189 he returned to his home at Herdewyke (now called Temple Herdewyke) in the county of Warwickshire in central England, only ten miles from what would later be Shakespeare's birthplace of Stratford-upon-Avon.

On his arrival home, de Sudeley immediately bought a large estate in the area and founded a Templar preceptory to train new recruits for a fresh Crusade planned by the English king Richard I. During this period, there was no such thing as a full-time, professional army in England, and in wartime troops were supplied by landlords who raised the required number of men from among their tenants. Most of these were sent into battle with little or no training. The exception, however, could be found in warrior orders such as the Knights Templar. A Templar preceptory was therefore a combined monastery and military base. While they were there, the monks lived a monastic life in one part of the camp, while the laymen lived in traditional barracks in another part of the base.

The local Feet of Fines, contemporary records of land and property holdings, show that de Sudeley's preceptory possessed expensive holy relics brought back from the Middle East. An entry for the year 1192 included mention of certain objets sacrés—"sacred artifacts"—that were housed in the chapel of the Herdewyke preceptory. As official documents in the twelfth century were frequently written in Norman French, the term objets sacrés was the usual way of describing holy relics returned from the Crusades, often precious objects thought to have been associated with the Bible. Unfortunately, no specific details are given, other than the fact that pilgrims donated large sums of money to the preceptory when they visited the chapel to see these items. Nevertheless, the chances are that these could well have been the same items discovered in the cave at Jebel Madhbah.”

It has been claimed that Sudeley was a leader of the Knights Templar c. 1180. In a novel The Essene Conspiracy he is mentioned as a crusader in 1190.

Graham Phillips claimed Ralph de Sudeley may have found the Ark of the Covenant when he discovered the Maccabean treasure at Jebel al Madhbah. Because Sudeley returned to Britain, it is theorised that he may have taken the Ark to Great Britain with him.
