= Arthur Chichester, 1st Marquess of Donegall =

English nobleman and politician

The Most Honourable The Marquess of Donegall
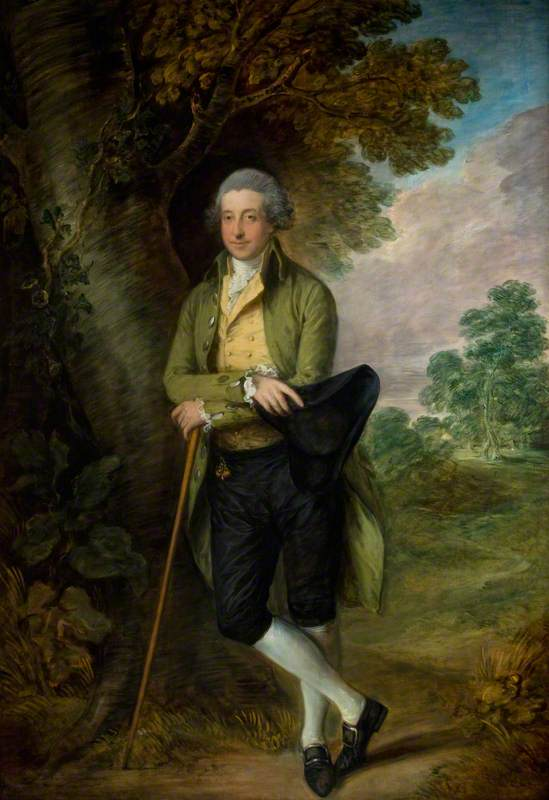
- Portrait of Lord Donegall by Thomas Gainsborough, c. 1780

Member of Parliament for Malmesbury
- In office 1768–1774 Serving with Thomas Howard
- Preceded by: Thomas Conolly; The Earl Tylney
- Succeeded by: Charles Fox; William Strahan

Member of the House of Lords (Note: As Baron Fisherwick.)
- Lord Temporal
- In office 3 July 1790 – 5 January 1799
- Preceded by: Peerage created
- Succeeded by: The 2nd Marquess of Donegall

Personal details
- Born: 13 June 1739
- Died: 5 January 1799 (aged 59)
- Spouse(s): Lady Anne Hamilton (m. 1761; died 1780) Charlotte Spencer Moore (m. 1788; died 1789) Barbara Godfrey (m. 1790–1799)
- Children: 7
- Parent(s): Hon. John Chichester; Elizabeth Newdigate
- Relatives: Sir Richard Newdigate, 3rd Baronet (grandfather)
- Education: Trinity College, Oxford
- Other titles: 5th Earl of Donegall; 6th Viscount Chichester; 6th Baron Chichester; 1st Baron Fisherwick

Arthur Chichester, 1st Marquess of Donegall (13 June 1739 – 5 January 1799), known as Arthur Chichester until 1757 and as The Earl of Donegall between 1757 and 1791, was an English nobleman and politician in Ireland.

== Early life ==
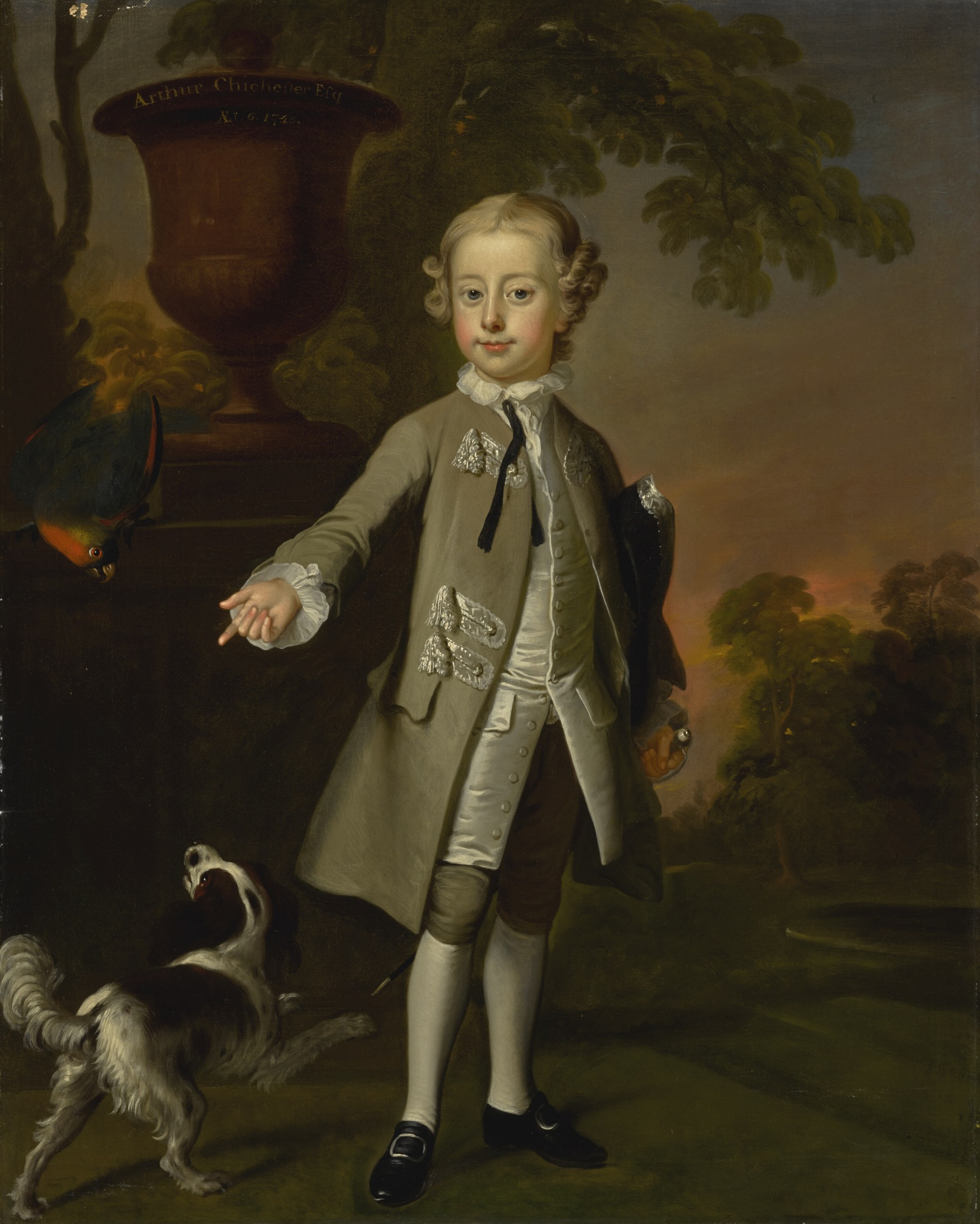
Portrait of Arthur Chichester by Thomas Hudson, 1745

Chichester was born on 13 June 1739. He was the son of Hon. John Chichester and Elizabeth Newdigate (1703–1769), eldest daughter of Sir Richard Newdigate, 3rd Baronet. His paternal grandparents were Arthur Chichester, 3rd Earl of Donegall, and Lady Catherine Forbes (a daughter of the 1st Earl of Granard), in 1726.

He was educated at Westminster School in 1748 and Trinity College, Oxford, matriculating in 1757, before succeeding his uncle in 1757 as fifth Earl of Donegall.

== Career ==
After taking his seat in the Irish House of Lords in 1765, Donegall served at Westminster as Member of Parliament for Malmesbury (1768–1774) by his friend Lord Suffolk, first following Suffolk and the Grenville group. Reportedly, he never spoke in the House, and did not stand for reelection in 1774.

As a means of securing his support for the Government in the Irish House of Commons, he was in 1790 created Baron Fisherwick, of Fisherwick in the County of Stafford, in the Peerage of Great Britain. The following year he was also created Earl of Belfast and Marquess of Donegall in the Peerage of Ireland.

== Personal life ==
Lord Donegall married three times. On 11 September 1761, he married Lady Anne Hamilton, daughter of James Hamilton, 5th Duke of Hamilton. Before her death on 11 November 1780, they had seven children:

- Lady Charlotte Anne Chichester (b. 1762), who died in infancy.
- Lady Henrietta Chichester (b. 1765), who died in infancy.
- George Chichester, 2nd Marquess of Donegall (1769–1844), who married Anna May, daughter of Sir Edward May, 2nd Baronet, in 1795.
- Hon. Arthur Chichester (1771–1788), who died young.
- Lord Spencer Stanley Chichester (1775–1819), MP for Belfast and Carrickfergus who married Lady Anne Harriet Stewart, daughter of John Stewart, 7th Earl of Galloway, in 1795.
- Lady Elizabeth Juliana Chichester (d. 1787)
- Lady Amelia Chichester, who died in infancy.

On 24 October 1788 he married Charlotte Moore (née Spencer), daughter of Conway Spencer, and widow of Thomas Moore. She died, without issue, on 19 September 1789.

In October 1790, he married Barbara Godfrey, daughter of the Rev. Dr. Luke Godfrey, Rector of Midleton, County Cork.

Lord Donegall held on lease a country residence at Butley Priory, Suffolk. He died on 5 January 1799, aged 59, at his London home in St James's Square, Westminster. His widow, the dowager Marchioness of Donegall, died on 28 December 1829.

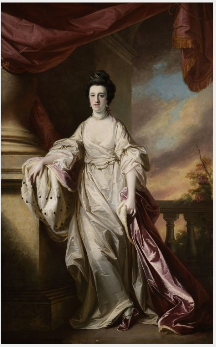
Portrait of his first wife, Lady Anne Hamilton, Countess of Donegall, by Francis Cotes, 1766

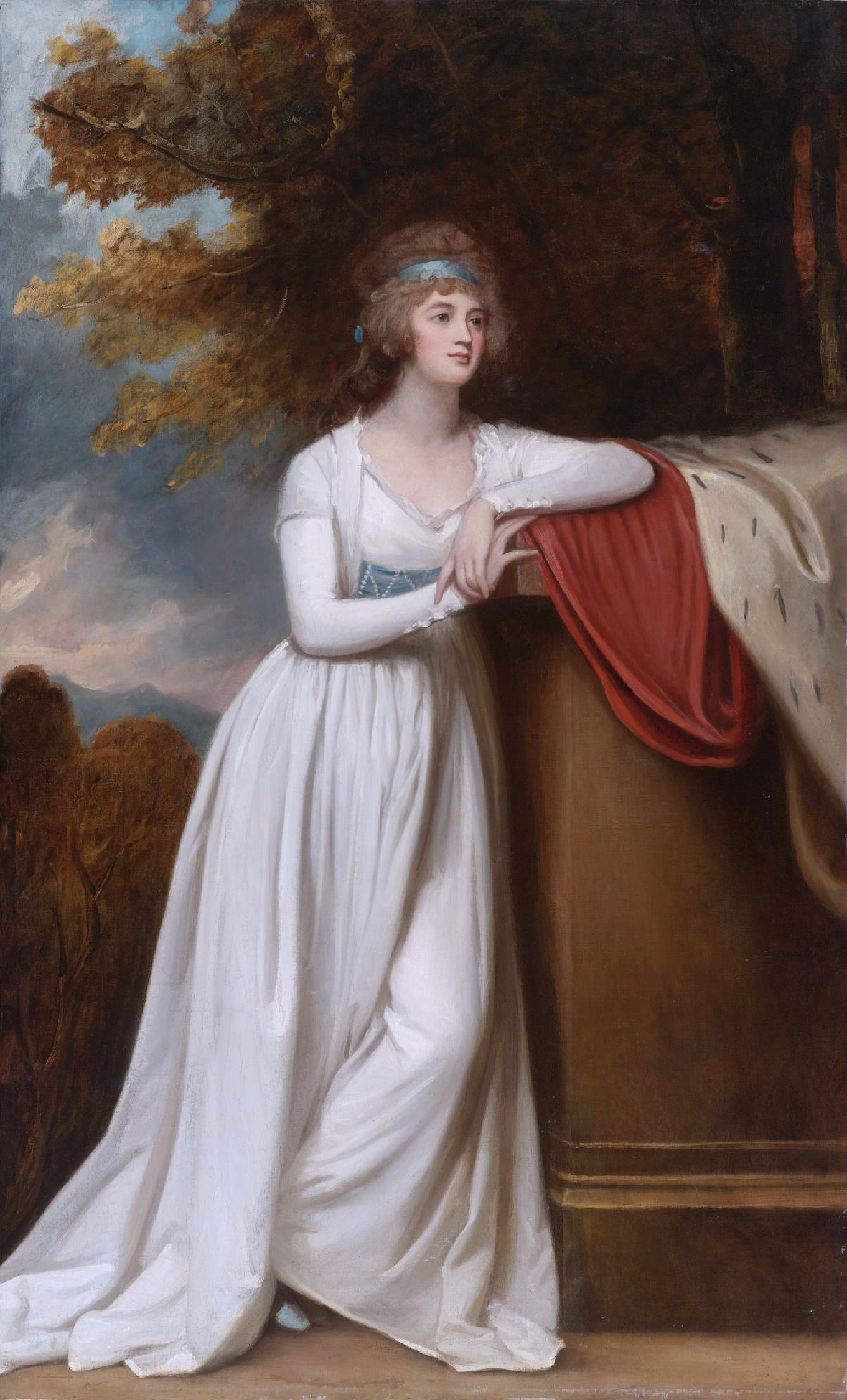
Portrait of his third wife, Barbara, Marchioness of Donegall, by George Romney, 1793

== Arms ==
Coat of arms of Arthur Chichester, 1st Marquess of Donegall
Coronet That of a marquess. Crest A stork, proper, wings expanded, holding in its beak an eel, argent, head or. Escutcheon Quarterly: 1st and 4th, chequy, or and gule, a chief vair (Chichester); 2nd and 3rd, azure fretty argent (Etchingham). Supporters Two wolves gules, ducally gorged and chained or. Motto Invitum sequitur honor (Honour follows, though unsought for).

== Notes ==
Parliament of Great Britain
Preceded by Thomas Conolly; The Earl Tylney	Member of Parliament for Malmesbury; 1768–1774; With: Thomas Howard	Succeeded by Charles Fox; William Strahan
Peerage of Ireland
New creation	Marquess of Donegall; 1791–1799	Succeeded by George Chichester
Preceded by Arthur Chichester	Earl of Donegall; 1757–1799	Succeeded by George Chichester
Preceded by Arthur Chichester	Viscount Chichester; 1757–1799	Succeeded by George Chichester
Preceded by Arthur Chichester	Baron Chichester; 2nd creation 1757–1799	Succeeded by George Chichester
Peerage of Great Britain
New creation	Baron Fisherwick; 1790–1799; Member of the House of Lords (1790–1799)	Succeeded by George Chichester
