= 1943 Daventry by-election =

UK by-election

The 1943 Daventry by-election was a parliamentary by-election for the British House of Commons constituency of Daventry, Northamptonshire, on 20 April 1943.

== Vacancy ==
The by-election was caused by the death of the sitting MP and Speaker, Edward FitzRoy on 3 March 1943. He had been MP here since winning the seat as a Conservative when the seat was created in 1918.

== Election history ==
The result at the last general election was as follows:

1935 general election: Daventry
Party	Candidate	Votes	%	±%
Speaker	Edward FitzRoy	18,934	63.75	N/A
Labour	TE Barnes	10,767	36.25	New
Majority		8,167	27.50	N/A
Turnout		29,701	76.00	N/A
Speaker hold		Swing	N/A	

== Candidates ==
The local Conservatives selected 38-year-old Reginald Manningham-Buller. The Labour Party had selected Paul Williams. At the outbreak of war, the Conservative, Liberal and Labour parties had agreed an electoral truce which meant that when a by-election occurred, the party that was defending the seat would not be opposed by an official candidate from the other two parties. When the Labour and Liberal parties joined the Coalition government, it was agreed that any by-election candidate defending a government seat would receive a letter of endorsement jointly signed by all the party leaders.

Dennis Webb was Chairman of the Common Wealth Party's Northampton branch. and came forward as a candidate. Liberal Party member William Dyer decided to break the electoral truce and stand as an Independent Liberal.

== Campaign ==
Polling day was set for 20 April 1943, 48 days after the death of Fitzroy, allowing for a long campaign. When nominations closed, it was to reveal a three horse race.

Manningham-Buller received a joint letter of endorsement from all the leaders of the parties in the coalition.

Manningham-Buller addressing a campaign meeting said "Three countries will be pleased if I am defeated - Germany, Italy and Japan."

== Result ==
Daventry by-election, 1943
Party	Candidate	Votes	%	±%
Conservative	Reginald Manningham-Buller	9,043	45.8	−18.0
Common Wealth	Dennis Webb	6,391	33.4	New
Independent Liberal	William George Ernest Dyer	4,093	20.8	New
Majority		2,652	12.4	−15.1
Turnout		19,527	48.8	−27.2
Conservative gain from Speaker		Swing	N/A	

== Aftermath ==
Paul Williams, who had been Labour's prospective candidate at the start of the war, ran Manningham-Buller close. Dyer, now standing officially as the Liberal Party candidate. The result at the following General election;

General election 1945: Daventry
Party	Candidate	Votes	%	±%
Conservative	Reginald Manningham-Buller	14,863	42.8	N/A
Labour	Paul Williams	13,693	39.5	+3.2
Liberal	William George Ernest Dyer	6,130	17.7	N/A
Majority		1,170	3.4	−24.1
Turnout		34,686	75.0	−1.0
Conservative hold		Swing		

== See also ==
- List of United Kingdom by-elections
- United Kingdom by-election records
