= Edward FitzRoy =

British politician (1869–1943)

The Right Honourable Edward FitzRoy JP DL
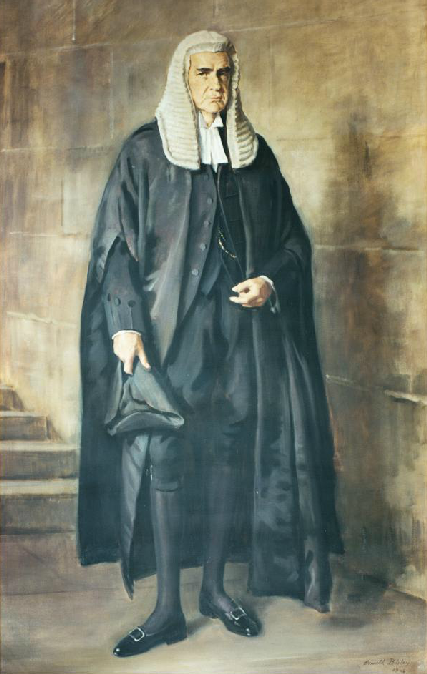

Speaker of the House of Commons of the United Kingdom
- In office 20 June 1928 – 3 March 1943
- Monarchs: George V Edward VIII; George VI
- Prime Minister: Stanley Baldwin; Ramsay MacDonald; Neville Chamberlain; Winston Churchill
- Preceded by: John Henry Whitley
- Succeeded by: Douglas Clifton Brown

Deputy Chairman of Ways and Means
- In office 9 December 1924 – 20 June 1928
- Speaker: John Henry Whitley
- Preceded by: Cyril Entwistle
- Succeeded by: Dennis Herbert

Member of Parliament for Daventry South Northamptonshire (1906–1918)
- In office 15 January 1910 – 3 March 1943
- Preceded by: Archibald Grove
- Succeeded by: Reginald Manningham-Buller
- In office 24 October 1900 – 12 January 1906
- Preceded by: Edward Douglas-Pennant
- Succeeded by: Archibald Grove

Personal details
- Born: Edward Algernon FitzRoy; 24 July 1869 London, England
- Died: 3 March 1943 (aged 73) Westminster, London, England
- Party: Conservative
- Spouse: Muriel FitzRoy (m. 1891)
- Children: 4, including Maurice

Edward Algernon FitzRoy JP DL (24 July 1869 – 3 March 1943) was a British Conservative politician who served as Speaker of the House of Commons from 1928 until his death in 1943.

== Early life ==
FitzRoy was the second son of the 3rd Baron Southampton and his second wife, Ismania Catherine Nugent, a granddaughter of Sir Charles Jenkinson, 10th Baronet. He came from a family with a long line of public service and was a descendant of Charles II's illegitimate son Henry FitzRoy, 1st Duke of Grafton. Through ancestor Anne Warren, the daughter of Admiral Peter Warren, he was a descendant of the Schuyler family, the Van Cortlandt family, and the Delancey family, all from British North America.

His mother was Lady of the Bedchamber to Queen Victoria and young FitzRoy was a Page of Honour to the Queen.

== Political career ==
A member of Northamptonshire County Council from 1896 to 1921, FitzRoy first entered Parliament in 1900 general election as Member of Parliament (MP) for Northamptonshire South. He was appointed a deputy lieutenant of Northamptonshire in 1901. He was re-elected during the January 1910 general election for Northamptonshire South. He held the seat in the December 1910 general election.

During World War I, whilst still an MP, he served in the British Army as a captain of the 1st Regiment of Life Guards, was wounded at the First Battle of Ypres and commanded the mounted troops of the Guards Division from 1915–16.

In the 1918 general election, he was elected for the seat of Daventry. He held the seat in the 1922, 1923, 1924, 1929, 1931 and 1935 general elections.

He served as deputy chair of the Committee of Ways and Means from 1924 to 1928. He was made a Privy Councillor in February 1924. He was elected Speaker of the House of Commons on 20 June 1928. In 1931, he was awarded a Doctor of Laws degree from the University of Cambridge and an honorary Doctor of Civil Law degree from the University of Oxford in 1934. In 1935, there was considerable controversy when the Labour Party decided to stand a candidate against him in the general election. According to The Times' obituary, "In addition to his former party Mr. Lloyd George and the Liberal leaders came out strongly in defence of his position. Even on the lowest ground of party interest Labour made a grave mistake, for Captain FitzRoy was returned by a resounding majority."

Fitzroy died in office, aged 73 in Westminster in 1943. He was succeeded by Douglas Clifton-Brown. In 1983, Labour MP and then Father of the House John Parker paid a humorous tribute to him: "I remember the first Speaker in my time, Captain Fitzroy. He was definitely a bit of a tartar. He disliked new young Members. When he was in the Chair, if someone spoke for too long he banged his hand on the side of his Chair. The longer the Member continued to speak, the more vigorously he hit the Chair. Everyone saw that except, unfortunately, the Member who was speaking, who was not deterred. Captain Fitzroy took a firm revenge and did not call that Member for a long time." Parker also reported, "Captain Fitzroy once told me that, as a descendant of Nell Gwyn and Charles II, the most embarrassing thing that he had had to do in the House was to announce the abdication of Edward VIII. He found that awkward and embarrassing". (Note: Here Parker makes an error, as Fitzroy was descended from Barbara Villiers, not Nell Gwyn.)

== Personal life ==
FitzRoy married Muriel Douglas-Pennant on 19 November 1891. She was appointed a CBE in 1918. Upon his death she was given a Viscountcy, the customary retirement honour for Speakers, as Viscountess Daventry.

Fitzroy and Lady Daventry had four children:

- Robert Oliver Fitzroy, 2nd Viscount Daventry (10 January 1893 – 1986)
- Hon. Nancy Jean Fitzroy BEM (31 May 1894 – 23 November 1983)
- Captain Michael Algernon Fitzroy (27 June 1895 † 15 April 1915)
- Commander Hon. John Maurice FitzRoy Newdegate (20 March 1897 – 7 May 1976), father of Francis FitzRoy Newdegate, 3rd Viscount Daventry

== Arms ==
Fitzroy's arms, as displayed in Speaker's House were the same as those of the Dukes of Grafton.

Coat of arms of Edward FitzRoy
Escutcheon The Royal Arms of Charles II, viz. Quarterly: 1st and 4th, France and England quarterly; 2nd, Scotland; 3rd, Ireland; the whole debruised by a Baton sinister compony of six pieces Argent and Azure.

== Notes ==
Court offices
Preceded by George Byng	Page of Honour; 1883–1886	Succeeded by Cyril Stopford
Parliament of the United Kingdom
Preceded by Hon. Edward Douglas-Pennant	Member of Parliament for Northamptonshire South; 1900–1906	Succeeded by Archibald Grove
Preceded by Archibald Grove	Member of Parliament for Northamptonshire South; 1910–1918	Constituency abolished
New constituency	Member of Parliament for Daventry; 1918–1943	Succeeded by Reginald Manningham-Buller
Preceded by Cyril Entwistle	Deputy Chairman of Ways and Means; 1924–1928	Succeeded by Dennis Herbert
Preceded by John Henry Whitley	Speaker of the House of Commons; 1928–1943	Succeeded by Douglas Clifton Brown
