= Newdigate baronets =

Extinct baronetcy in the Baronetage of England

The Newdigate baronetcy, of Arbury, Warwickshire, was created on 24 July 1677 in the Baronetage of England for Richard Newdigate of Arbury Hall. It became extinct on the death of the 5th Baronet on 2 December 1806.

== Baronets of Arbury (1677) ==
Escutcheon of the Newdigate baronets of Arbury

- Sir Richard Newdigate, 1st Baronet (1602–1678)
- Sir Richard Newdigate, 2nd Baronet (1644–1709)
- Sir Richard Newdigate, 3rd Baronet (1668–1727)
- Sir Edward Newdigate, 4th Baronet (1716–1732)
- Sir Roger Newdigate, 5th Baronet (1719–1806)

== Tree of notable family members ==
- John Newdigate of Newdigate (temp. Edward III)
  - William Newdigate (died 1377), MP for Surrey in 1372
    - John Newdigate (died 1388), MP for Surrey in 1386
  - Sir John Newdigate of Harefield
    - John Newdigate
      - William Newdigate (died 1465)
        - John Newdigate
          - John Newdigate (died 1528), serjeant-at-law
            - John Newdigate (1494–1545)
              - John Newdigate (1514–1565), MP for Middlesex
                - John Newdigate of Arbury (died 1592), MP for Middlesex
                  - Sir John Newdigate (1570–1610), married to Anne Fitton (1574–1618)
                    - John Newdigate (1600–1642), MP for Liverpool
                    - Sir Richard Newdigate, 1st Baronet (1602–1678), MP for Tamworth and Lord Chief Justice
                      - Sir Richard Newdigate, 2nd Baronet (1644–1710), MP for Warwickshire
                        - Sir Richard Newdigate, 3rd Baronet (1668–1727)
                          - Sir Edward Newdigate, 4th Baronet (1716–1732)
                          - Sir Roger Newdigate, 5th Baronet (1719–1806), MP for Middlesex and Oxford University; namesake of the Newdigate Prize
                          - Juliana Newdigate, married to John Ludford of Ansley Hall (1707–1775)
                            - John Newdigate Ludford (died 1822)
                              - Elizabeth Juliana Newdigate Ludford (died 1859), married to Sir John Newdigate-Ludford-Chetwode, 5th Baronet (1788–1873)
                        - Francis Newdigate of Kirk Hallam
                          - Millicent Newdigate, married to William Parker of Salford Priors
                            - Francis Parker Newdigate of Kirk Hallam and West Hallam (died 1755)
                              - Francis Parker Newdigate (1774–1862)
                                - Lieutenant-Colonel Francis William Newdigate (1822–1893)
                                  - Sir Francis Alexander Newdigate Newdegate (1862–1936), MP for Nuneaton and Tamworth; Governor of Tasmania and Western Australia
                                    - Lucia Newdigate Newdegate (died 1982), married to Maurice FitzRoy (1897–1976), who adopted the name Newdegate
                                      - Francis FitzRoy Newdegate, 3rd Viscount Daventry (1921–2000)
                                - Lieutenant-General Sir Edward Newdigate Newdegate (1825–1902)
                                - Alfred Newdigate (born 1829)
                                  - Bernard Henry Newdigate (1869–1944), author
                                - Lieutenant-General Sir Henry Richard Legge Newdigate (1832–1908)
                            - Charles Parker of Harefield (died 1795)
                              - Charles Parker Newdigate Newdegate (died 1833)
                                - Charles Newdigate Newdegate (1816–1887), MP for North Warwickshire
                      - Thomas Newdigate of Hawton (died 1723), purchased the Newdigate House in Nottingham
                        - Richard Newdigate (1679–1745), MP for Newark
              - Francis Newdigate (1519–1582), MP for Great Bedwyn, Chippenham and Middlesex
              - Nicholas Newdigate (born 1520), MP for Westminster
              - Robert Newdigate (1528–1584), MP for Buckingham and Berwick-upon-Tweed
                - Robert Newdigate (died 1613), MP for Grampound and Buckingham
            - William Newdigate (1495–1530), MP for Great Bedwyn
            - Sebastian Newdigate (1500–1535), Carthusian monk

== See also ==
- Viscount Daventry
