= Viscount Daventry =

Viscountcy in the Peerage of the United Kingdom

Viscountcy of Daventry
- Quarterly: 1st and 4th, Gules three Lion's Gambs two and one Argent (Newdegate); 2nd and 3rd, the Royal Arms of King Charles II debruised by a Baton Sinister compony Argent and Azure (FitzRoy)
- Creation date: 6 May 1943
- Created by: King George VI
- Peerage: Peerage of the United Kingdom
- First holder: Muriel FitzRoy, 1st Viscountess Daventry
- Present holder: James Edward FitzRoy Newdegate, 4th Viscount Daventry
- Heir apparent: the Hon. Humphrey John FitzRoy Newdegate
- Status: Extant
- Seat: Arbury Hall

Viscount Daventry, of Daventry in the County of Northampton, is a title in the Peerage of the United Kingdom. It was created on 6 May 1943 for Muriel FitzRoy (née Douglas-Pennant), in honour of her late husband, the Hon. Edward FitzRoy, Speaker of the House of Commons from 1928 until his death in 1943. The first Viscountess was the sister of Frank Douglas-Pennant, 5th Baron Penrhyn, whilst Edward FitzRoy was the second son of Charles FitzRoy, 3rd Baron Southampton, and a male-line descendant of Charles FitzRoy, 2nd Duke of Grafton. Lady Daventry was succeeded by her eldest son, the second Viscount. He was a captain in the Royal Navy. He was succeeded by his nephew, the third Viscount. His father had assumed the additional surname of Newdegate, which was that of his father-in-law. As of 2017 the title is held by his son, the fourth Viscount, who succeeded in 2000. As a male-line descendant of both the third Baron Southampton and the second Duke of Grafton, he is also in remainder to those peerages.

The family seat is Arbury Hall, near Nuneaton, Warwickshire.

== Viscounts Daventry (1943) ==
- Muriel FitzRoy, 1st Viscountess Daventry (1869–1962)
- Robert Oliver FitzRoy, 2nd Viscount Daventry (1893–1986)
- Francis Humphrey Maurice FitzRoy Newdegate, 3rd Viscount Daventry (1921–2000)
- James Edward FitzRoy Newdegate, 4th Viscount Daventry (b. 1960)

The heir apparent is the present holder's son the Hon. Humphrey John FitzRoy Newdegate (b. 1995).

=== Line of succession ===
- Francis Humphrey Maurice Fitzroy Newdegate, 3rd Viscount Daventry (1921 - 2000)
  - James Edward Fitzroy Newdegate, 4th Viscount Daventry (born 1960)
    - (1) Hon. Humphrey John Fitzroy Newdegate (b. 1995)

== See also ==
- Baron Penrhyn
- Newdigate baronets
