= Daventry (constituency) =

UK Parliament constituency (since 1974)

Coordinates: 52.30°N 1.08°W

- County constituency for the House of Commons
- Interactive map of boundaries from 2024
- Location within the East Midlands
- County: Northamptonshire
- Electorate: 76,539 (March 2020)
- Major settlements: Daventry, Earls Barton, Brixworth

Current constituency
- Created: 1974
- Member of Parliament: Stuart Andrew (Conservative)
- Seats: One
- Created from: South Northamptonshire

1918–1950
- Created from: South Northamptonshire and Mid Northamptonshire
- Replaced by: South Northamptonshire

Daventry is a constituency (Note: A county constituency (for the purposes of election expenses and type of returning officer)) in Northamptonshire represented in the House of Commons of the UK Parliament since 2024 by Stuart Andrew of the Conservative Party.

== Constituency profile ==
The Daventry constituency is located in Northamptonshire and covers a large rural area to the north of the county town of Northampton. The constituency is named after its largest settlement, the town of Daventry, which has a population of around 28,000. The constituency contains many smaller villages, including Woodford Halse, Long Buckby, Brixworth, Moulton and Earls Barton. Daventry was traditionally a small market town which grew rapidly in the 1960s as a planned community to accommodate overspill from Birmingham. The town has average levels of wealth whilst the rural areas, particularly around Brixworth and Moulton, are generally affluent.

Compared to the rest of the country, residents of the constituency are older, wealthier and have a higher rate of professional employment. House prices are higher than the rest of the East Midlands. At the 2021 census, White people made up 94% of the population. At the local council level, Daventry and Moulton are represented by Reform UK whilst the rural areas of the constituency elected Conservative and Liberal Democrat councillors. An estimated 58% of voters in the constituency supported leaving the European Union in the 2016 referendum, above the nationwide figure of 52%.

== History ==
The seat, one of many created in 1918, was a narrower form of the oldest creation of South Northamptonshire and lasted 32 years until it reverted into "South Northamptonshire". Finally today's seat was recreated mostly from the north of the South Northants seat (Note: South Northamptonshire was revived in 2010 and it covers the area to the south including Towcester and Brackley) in 1974. Since its recreation and during its first existence, it has been served by Conservative MPs. As the 1997 and 2024 majorities were also not marginal, it has been to date an archetypal safe seat.

== Boundaries ==
The constituency covers the west of Northamptonshire and is named for the market town of Daventry.

=== Historic ===
Map of boundaries 2010–2024

1918–1950: The Boroughs of Daventry and Brackley, the Rural Districts of Brackley, Crick, Daventry, Hardingstone, Middleton Cheney, Potterspury, and Towcester, and part of the Rural District of Northampton.

1974–1983: The Boroughs of Brackley and Daventry, and the Rural Districts of Brackley, Brixworth, Daventry, Northampton, and Towcester.

1983–1997: The District of Daventry wards of Abbey North, Abbey South, Badby, Barby, Brampton, Braunston, Byfield, Crick and West Haddon, Drayton, Everdon, Flore, Guilsborough, Hill, Kilsby, Long Buckby, Ravensthorpe, Spratton, Weedon, Welford, Woodford, and Yelvertoft, and the District of South Northamptonshire wards of Astwell, Blakesley, Brackley East, Brackley West, Cosgrove, Danvers, Deanshanger, Forest, Grafton, Greatworth, King's Sutton, Kingthorn, Middleton Cheney, Potterspury, Rainsborough, Slapton, Tove, Towcester, and Wardoun.

1997–2010: The District of Daventry wards of Abbey North, Abbey South, Badby, Barby, Brampton, Braunston, Byfield, Crick and West Haddon, Drayton, Everdon, Flore, Hill, Kilsby, Long Buckby, Ravensthorpe, Weedon, Woodford, and Yelvertoft, and the District of South Northamptonshire wards of Astwell, Blakesley, Blisworth, Brackley East, Brackley West, Bugbrooke, Cosgrove, Danvers, Deanshanger, Forest, Gayton, Grafton, Greatworth, Heyford, King's Sutton, Kingthorn, Middleton Cheney, Potterspury, Rainsborough, Slapton, Tove, Towcester, and Wardoun.

2010–2021: The District of Daventry, the District of South Northamptonshire wards of Cote, Downs, Grange, Harpole, and Heyford, and the Borough of Wellingborough wards of Earls Barton and West.

2021–2024: With effect from 1 April 2021, the second tier authorities in Northamptonshire were abolished and absorbed into the two new unitary authorities of North Northamptonshire and West Northamptonshire. From that date, the constituency comprised the District of North Northamptonshire ward of Earls Barton (part); and the District of West Northamptonshire wards of Braunston and Crick, Brixworth, Bugbrooke (part), Daventry East, Daventry West, Long Buckby, Moulton, and Woodford and Weedon.

=== Current ===
Further to the 2023 Periodic Review of Westminster constituencies, which came into effect for the 2024 general election, the composition of the constituency was defined as follows (as they existed on 1 April 2021):

- The District of North Northamptonshire ward of Earls Barton
- The District of West Northamptonshire wards of Braunston and Crick; Brixworth; Daventry East; Daventry West; Long Buckby; Moulton; Silverstone (polling districts SAG, SAP, SAQ, SBJ and SCL); Woodford and Weedon.

The part of the Bugbrooke ward was transferred to South Northamptonshire, offset by the addition of the remainder of the Earls Barton ward from Wellingborough and the part of Silverstone ward from South Northamptonshire.

Further to local government boundary reviews which came into effect in May 2025, the constituency now comprises the following:

- The District of North Northamptonshire wards of Earls Barton; Hatton Park (small part); Irchester (small part).
- The District of West Northamptonshire wards of Braunston and Crick; Brixworth; Campion (small part); Daventry North East; Daventry North West; Daventry South; Kingsthorpe South (small part); Long Buckby; Moulton (most); Naseby; Rural North East; Rural South Northamptonshire (small part); Woodford and Weedon.

== Members of Parliament ==
=== MPs 1918–1950 ===
South Northamptonshire and Mid Northamptonshire prior to 1918

| Election | Member | Party |
|---|---|---|
| 1918 | Edward FitzRoy | Conservative |
| 1928 | Edward FitzRoy | Speaker |
| 1943 by-election | Reginald Manningham-Buller | Conservative |
| 1950 | Constituency abolished | |

=== MPs since Feb 1974 ===
South Northamptonshire prior to 1974

| Election | Member | Party |
|---|---|---|
| Feb 1974 | Arthur Jones | Conservative |
| 1979 | Reg Prentice | Conservative |
| 1987 | Tim Boswell | Conservative |
| 2010 | Chris Heaton-Harris | Conservative |
| 2024 | Stuart Andrew | Conservative |

== Elections ==
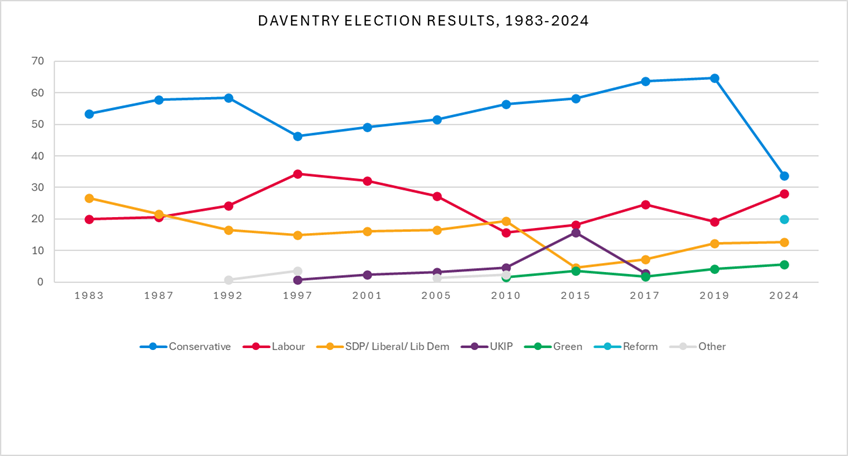
Daventry election results 1983–2024

=== Elections in the 2020s ===
General election 2024: Daventry
| Party | Candidate | Votes | % | ±% |
|---|---|---|---|---|
| Conservative | Stuart Andrew | 17,872 | 33.7 | −30.8 |
| Labour | Marianne Kimani | 14,860 | 28.0 | +10.2 |
| Reform | Scott Cameron | 10,636 | 20.0 | New |
| Liberal Democrats | Jonathan Harris | 6,755 | 12.7 | −0.4 |
| Green | Clare Slater | 2,959 | 5.6 | +1.0 |
| Majority | | 3,012 | 5.7 | −39.8 |
| Turnout | | 53,082 | 65.9 | −8.2 |
| Registered electors | | 80,879 | | |
| Conservative hold | | Swing | −19.9 | |

=== Elections in the 2010s ===
General election 2019: Daventry
| Party | Candidate | Votes | % | ±% |
|---|---|---|---|---|
| Conservative | Chris Heaton-Harris | 37,055 | 64.6 | +0.9 |
| Labour | Paul Joyce | 10,975 | 19.1 | −5.6 |
| Liberal Democrats | Andrew Simpson | 7,032 | 12.3 | +5.1 |
| Green | Clare Slater | 2,341 | 4.1 | +2.4 |
| Majority | | 26,080 | 45.5 | +6.5 |
| Turnout | | 57,403 | 74.1 | +0.1 |
| Conservative hold | | Swing | +3.2 | |

General election 2017: Daventry
| Party | Candidate | Votes | % | ±% |
|---|---|---|---|---|
| Conservative | Chris Heaton-Harris | 35,464 | 63.7 | +5.5 |
| Labour | Aiden Ramsey | 13,730 | 24.7 | +6.6 |
| Liberal Democrats | Andrew Simpson | 4,015 | 7.2 | +2.7 |
| UKIP | Ian Gibbins | 1,497 | 2.7 | −13.1 |
| Green | Jamie Wildman | 957 | 1.7 | −1.8 |
| Majority | | 21,734 | 39.0 | −1.1 |
| Turnout | | 55,663 | 74.0 | +1.8 |
| Conservative hold | | Swing | −0.55 | |

General election 2015: Daventry
| Party | Candidate | Votes | % | ±% |
|---|---|---|---|---|
| Conservative | Chris Heaton-Harris | 30,550 | 58.2 | +1.7 |
| Labour | Abigail Campbell | 9,491 | 18.1 | +2.3 |
| UKIP | Michael Gerard | 8,296 | 15.8 | +11.3 |
| Liberal Democrats | Callum Delhoy | 2,352 | 4.5 | −14.9 |
| Green | Steve Whiffen | 1,829 | 3.5 | +2.0 |
| Majority | | 21,059 | 40.1 | +3.0 |
| Turnout | | 52,518 | 72.2 | −0.3 |
| Conservative hold | | Swing | | |

UKIP originally selected Nigel Wickens, who was also selected for Mid Bedfordshire.

General election 2010: Daventry
| Party | Candidate | Votes | % | ±% |
|---|---|---|---|---|
| Conservative | Chris Heaton-Harris | 29,252 | 56.5 | +3.5 |
| Liberal Democrats | Christopher McGlynn | 10,064 | 19.4 | +4.9 |
| Labour | Paul Corazzo | 8,168 | 15.8 | −12.1 |
| UKIP | Jim Broomfield | 2,333 | 4.5 | +1.6 |
| English Democrat | Alan Bennett-Spencer | 1,187 | 2.3 | New |
| Green | Steve Whiffen | 770 | 1.5 | New |
| Majority | | 19,188 | 37.1 | +12.8 |
| Turnout | | 51,774 | 72.5 | +4.6 |
| Conservative hold | | Swing | −0.7 | |

After the 2005 general election, Daventry incurred massive boundary changes following the creation of the new South Northamptonshire seat. The results of the 2010 general election are based on the notional results for the new boundaries.

=== Elections in the 2000s ===
General election 2005: Daventry
| Party | Candidate | Votes | % | ±% |
|---|---|---|---|---|
| Conservative | Tim Boswell | 31,206 | 51.6 | +2.4 |
| Labour | Andrew Hammond | 16,520 | 27.3 | −4.9 |
| Liberal Democrats | Hannah Saul | 9,964 | 16.5 | +0.4 |
| UKIP | Barry Mahoney | 1,927 | 3.2 | +0.8 |
| Veritas | Barrie Wilkins | 822 | 1.4 | New |
| Majority | | 14,686 | 24.3 | +7.3 |
| Turnout | | 60,439 | 68.1 | +2.6 |
| Conservative hold | | Swing | +3.6 | |

General election 2001: Daventry
| Party | Candidate | Votes | % | ±% |
|---|---|---|---|---|
| Conservative | Tim Boswell | 27,911 | 49.2 | +2.9 |
| Labour | Kevin Quigley | 18,262 | 32.2 | −2.2 |
| Liberal Democrats | Jamie Calder | 9,130 | 16.1 | +1.1 |
| UKIP | Peter Baden | 1,381 | 2.4 | +1.7 |
| Majority | | 9,649 | 17.0 | +5.1 |
| Turnout | | 56,684 | 65.5 | −11.5 |
| Conservative hold | | Swing | +2.6 | |

=== Elections in the 1990s ===
General election 1997: Daventry
| Party | Candidate | Votes | % | ±% |
|---|---|---|---|---|
| Conservative | Tim Boswell | 28,615 | 46.3 | −11.4 |
| Labour | Ken Ritchie | 21,237 | 34.4 | +10.5 |
| Liberal Democrats | John Gordon | 9,233 | 15.0 | −2.7 |
| Referendum | Barbara Russocki | 2,018 | 3.3 | New |
| UKIP | B.J. Mahoney | 443 | 0.7 | New |
| Natural Law | Russell B. France | 204 | 0.3 | −0.4 |
| Majority | | 7,378 | 11.9 | −21.9 |
| Turnout | | 61,750 | 77.0 | |
| Conservative hold | | Swing | −11.1 | |

General election 1992: Daventry
| Party | Candidate | Votes | % | ±% |
|---|---|---|---|---|
| Conservative | Tim Boswell | 34,734 | 58.4 | +0.5 |
| Labour | Lesley Koumi | 14,460 | 24.3 | +3.7 |
| Liberal Democrats | Anthony S. Rounthwaite | 9,820 | 16.5 | −5.0 |
| Natural Law | Russell B. France | 422 | 0.7 | New |
| Majority | | 20,274 | 34.1 | −2.2 |
| Turnout | | 59,436 | 82.7 | +4.5 |
| Conservative hold | | Swing | −1.6 | |

=== Elections in the 1980s ===
General election 1987: Daventry
| Party | Candidate | Votes | % | ±% |
|---|---|---|---|---|
| Conservative | Tim Boswell | 31,353 | 57.9 | +4.6 |
| Liberal | Ian Miller | 11,663 | 21.6 | −5.1 |
| Labour | Lesley Koumi | 11,097 | 20.5 | +0.6 |
| Majority | | 19,690 | 36.3 | +9.7 |
| Turnout | | 54,113 | 78.2 | +1.4 |
| Conservative hold | | Swing | +4.8 | |

General election 1983: Daventry
| Party | Candidate | Votes | % | ±% |
|---|---|---|---|---|
| Conservative | Reg Prentice | 26,357 | 53.3 | −3.3 |
| SDP | David Collins | 13,221 | 26.7 | N/A |
| Labour | David Middleton | 9,840 | 19.9 | −7.4 |
| Majority | | 13,136 | 26.6 | −2.8 |
| Turnout | | 49,418 | 76.8 | −3.7 |
| Conservative hold | | Swing | | |

=== Elections in the 1970s ===
General election 1979: Daventry
| Party | Candidate | Votes | % | ±% |
|---|---|---|---|---|
| Conservative | Reg Prentice | 41,422 | 56.61 | |
| Labour | JL Rawlings | 19,939 | 27.25 | |
| Liberal | R Woodside | 11,286 | 15.42 | |
| National Front | G Younger | 522 | 0.71 | New |
| Majority | | 21,483 | 29.36 | |
| Turnout | | 73,169 | 80.50 | |
| Conservative hold | | Swing | | |

General election October 1974: Daventry
| Party | Candidate | Votes | % | ±% |
|---|---|---|---|---|
| Conservative | Arthur Jones | 29,801 | 46.43 | |
| Labour | D Forwood | 20,739 | 32.31 | |
| Liberal | D Cassidy | 13,640 | 21.25 | |
| Majority | | 9,062 | 14.12 | |
| Turnout | | 64,180 | 77.09 | |
| Conservative hold | | Swing | | |

General election February 1974: Daventry
| Party | Candidate | Votes | % | ±% |
|---|---|---|---|---|
| Conservative | Arthur Jones | 31,273 | 44.93 | |
| Labour | P Jones | 21,524 | 30.93 | |
| Liberal | P Smout | 16,802 | 24.14 | |
| Majority | | 9,749 | 14.00 | |
| Turnout | | 69,599 | 84.33 | |
| Conservative win (new seat) | | | | |

=== Elections in the 1940s ===
General election 1945: Daventry
| Party | Candidate | Votes | % | ±% |
|---|---|---|---|---|
| Conservative | Reginald Manningham-Buller | 14,863 | 42.8 | New |
| Labour | Paul F Williams | 13,693 | 39.5 | +3.2 |
| Liberal | William George Ernest Dyer | 6,130 | 17.7 | N/A |
| Majority | | 1,170 | 3.3 | −24.1 |
| Turnout | | 34,686 | 75.0 | −1.0 |
| Conservative hold | | Swing | | |

1943 Daventry by-election
| Party | Candidate | Votes | % | ±% |
|---|---|---|---|---|
| Conservative | Reginald Manningham-Buller | 9,043 | 45.9 | −17.8 |
| Common Wealth | Dennis G Webb | 6,591 | 33.4 | New |
| Independent Liberal | William George Ernest Dyer | 4,093 | 20.7 | New |
| Majority | | 2,452 | 12.5 | −14.9 |
| Turnout | | 19,727 | 48.7 | −27.3 |
| Conservative hold | | Swing | N/A | |

General Election 1939–40:

Another General Election was required to take place before the end of 1940. The political parties had been making preparations for an election to take place from 1939 and by the end of this year, the following candidates had been selected;

- Speaker: Edward FitzRoy
- Labour: Paul F Williams

=== Elections in the 1930s ===
General election 1935: Daventry
| Party | Candidate | Votes | % | ±% |
|---|---|---|---|---|
| Speaker | Edward FitzRoy | 18,934 | 63.7 | N/A |
| Labour | TE Barnes | 10,767 | 36.3 | New |
| Majority | | 8,167 | 27.4 | N/A |
| Turnout | | 29,701 | 76.0 | N/A |
| Speaker hold | | Swing | N/A | |

General election 1931: Daventry
| Party | Candidate | Votes | % | ±% |
|---|---|---|---|---|
| Speaker | Edward FitzRoy | Unopposed | N/A | N/A |
| Speaker hold | | | | |

=== Elections in the 1920s ===
General election 1929: Daventry
| Party | Candidate | Votes | % | ±% |
|---|---|---|---|---|
| Speaker | Edward FitzRoy | Unopposed | N/A | N/A |
| Speaker hold | | | | |

General election 1924: Daventry
| Party | Candidate | Votes | % | ±% |
|---|---|---|---|---|
| Unionist | Edward FitzRoy | 12,683 | 50.4 | +5.7 |
| Liberal | Charles Kerr | 12,483 | 49.6 | +11.8 |
| Majority | | 200 | 0.8 | −6.1 |
| Turnout | | 25,166 | 79.7 | +3.6 |
| Unionist hold | | Swing | -3.1 | |

General election 1923: Daventry
| Party | Candidate | Votes | % | ±% |
|---|---|---|---|---|
| Unionist | Edward FitzRoy | 10,514 | 44.7 | −14.9 |
| Liberal | Charles Kerr | 8,914 | 37.8 | New |
| Labour | Len Smith | 4,127 | 17.5 | −22.9 |
| Majority | | 1,600 | 6.9 | −12.3 |
| Turnout | | 23,555 | 76.1 | +4.0 |
| Unionist hold | | Swing | | |

General election 1922: Daventry
| Party | Candidate | Votes | % | ±% |
|---|---|---|---|---|
| Unionist | Edward FitzRoy | 13,055 | 59.6 | +0.8 |
| Labour | Will Rogers | 8,850 | 40.4 | −0.8 |
| Majority | | 4,205 | 19.2 | +1.6 |
| Turnout | | 21,905 | 72.1 | +9.4 |
| Unionist hold | | Swing | +0.8 | |

=== Elections in the 1910s ===
General election 1918: Daventry
| Party | | Candidate | Votes | % | ±% |
|---|---|---|---|---|---|
| C | Unionist | Edward FitzRoy | 11,176 | 58.8 | |
| | Labour | Will Rogers | 7,824 | 41.2 | |
| Majority | | | 3,352 | 17.6 | |
| Turnout | | | 19,000 | 62.7 | |
| | Unionist win (new seat) | | | | |
C indicates candidate endorsed by the coalition government.

== See also ==
- List of parliamentary constituencies in Northamptonshire

== Notes ==
Parliament of the United Kingdom
| Preceded by Halifax | Constituency represented by the speaker 1928–1943 | Succeeded by Hexham |
