= Arbury Priory =

Augustinian priory in Warwickshire, England

Coordinates: 52.50021°N 1.50749°W

- Interactive map of Arbury Priory

Monastery information
- Full name: Arbury Priory of the Blessed Virgin Mary
- Order: Augustinian Canons Regular
- Established: 1154
- Disestablished: 1536

People
- Founder: Ralph de Sudeley

Site
- Location: Chilvers Coton, Warwickshire, England

Arbury Priory was an Augustinian priory in the parish of Chilvers Coton, Warwickshire, England.

The priory was founded early in the reign of Henry II (c.1154) by Ralph de Sudley and dedicated to the Blessed Virgin. The original endowment consisted of the churches of Chilvers Coton and Dassett, together with associated land and the rights to timber, wood for fuel, and pannage. It was later given the church of Weston under Wetherley by an unknown donor. In succeeding centuries more land was either donated or purchased.

In 1235 an enquiry commissioned by the Pope discovered that the priors were living a dissolute life as part of the Arroasian order. He ordered the Bishop of Coventry to convert them to the rule of St Augustine, which he did by transferring suitable monks to Arbury from other establishments to encourage their conversion.

At the time of the Dissolution of the Monasteries in 1536 the community consisted of a prior and six brothers, plus a number of servants. Arbury was granted to Charles Brandon, 1st Duke of Suffolk, a favourite of the king, whose heiress sold it to Sir Edmund Anderson, Chief Justice of the Common Pleas. He demolished the priory and used the materials to build Arbury Hall.
