= Sir Richard Newdigate, 2nd Baronet =

English landowner and mining entrepreneur (1644 – 1710)

- Predecessor: Sir Richard Newdigate, 1st Baronet
- Successor: Sir Richard Newdigate, 3rd Baronet
- Born: May 5, 1644
- Died: January 4, 1710 (aged 65)
- Spouses: Mary Bagot; (?-1692, her death); Henrietta Wigginton; (1704-1710, his death)
- Children: 11
- Father: Sir Richard Newdigate, 1st Baronet
- Mother: Juliana Leigh

Sir Richard Newdigate, 2nd Baronet (5 May 1644 – 4 January 1710) was an English landowner, entrepreneur, engineer, and politician who held the title of Commissioner for Assessment for Warwickshire, and served on the Warwickshire Commission of the Peace, as well as Member of Parliament for Warwickshire for two separate terms. He also became well known for investing his estate’s wealth into expansions and mining ventures, and for large infrastructure projects.

== Family ==
Richard Newdigate, 2nd Baronet was the eighth child and third (but only surviving) son born to Richard Newdigate, 1st Baronet (1602-1678) of Arbury Hall, Chilvers Coton, Warwickshire, and his wife Juliana Leigh (1610-1685) sister of Sir Francis Leigh of Dunsmore (1595-1653). He was the grandson of Sir John Newdigate (1571-1610), and had five sisters, who he stayed on good terms with for his entire life. His first marriage was to Mary (1646-1692), the daughter of Sir Edward Bagot of Blithfield Hall, Staffordshire (1616-1660), with whom he had seven surviving daughters and four sons. After relations with his family deteriorated in the final decade of his life, he married again to Henrietta (1685-1739), daughter of Thomas Wigginton (1644-1723) in 1704. There were no surviving children from this marriage. His son Sir Richard, 3rd Baronet was the father of Sir Roger Newdigate.

== Early life ==
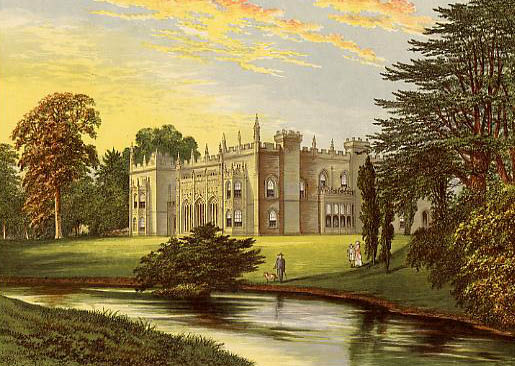
Arbury Hall in 1880

Newdigate was born on 5 May 1644. He was entered as a scholar at the age of ten at Gray's Inn, as it was within walking distance of his childhood home at Holborn, and his father was appointed as a sergeant there. He learned basic knowledge in Latin and the basic tenets of the law. At the age of seventeen, he enrolled at Christ Church, Oxford, but did not take a degree. He would however maintain lasting links with the University, particularly through his communication with the Dean of Christ Church, John Fell (1625-1686).

Almost a year after his twenty-first birthday, his father passed on all of his Warwickshire lands to him and enabled him to live at the estate in Arbury, which allowed him to collect rents over much of his father's vast land holdings. After the family had settled at Arbury Hall, Newdigate began acting as a broker for Birmingham gunsmiths and drew up a proposal for a canal between the Severn and the Avon. He also undertook a makeover to his estate, adding on a private chapel, stables, and gardens. He was particularly confident in his love of mines and mining, and he strove to construct a waterway from Arbury to Nuneaton by pioneering the use of mining methods in modern construction, a project that was abandoned after his death.

== Politics ==
While Newdigate declined an invitation to stand for the parliamentary seat of Lichfield following a vacancy due to death in 1678, he was appointed to the Warwickshire Commission of the Peace, which he was an active member in. However he soon began to show that his goals outweighed his position when he abortively proposed to raise a regiment of men and horses for the War with France, this request was denied and his behaviour during the process led to him being charged with levying men without a warrant, a charge that he was able to have cleared.

He lost contesting general elections in 1679, finishing at the bottom of the polls twice. In November of that year, he was dismissed from the magistrate chamber and from his position as gentleman of the privy chamber, however this was brief as he regained his position and was even pressured to accept a peerage. He was elected to the Oxford Parliament of 1681 as knight of the shire for Warwickshire but saw his entire armoury disposed after his implication in the assassination attempt colloquially known as the Rye House Plot. Following the Glorious Revolution, he was restored to the bench and elected to represent Warwickshire in the 1689 Convention Parliament. He was defeated at the general election in 1690 and would never again serve in Parliament.

== Later life ==
Following his departure from government, Newdigate’s debts increased as did his quarrels with his own family. He had a particularly poor relationship with his older son, whom he described in his own will as "my most inveterate and implacable enemy" His children petitioned in 1701 and again in 1703 to have him declared as insane but were defeated in court, Newdigate’s outrage at this turn of events was embodied into a pamphlet that he put out that while attention-grabbing, did a poor job of turning public opinion in his favour. He remarried in 1703 to the chagrin of his family, to Henrietta Wiggington, but was not able to produce any more surviving offspring. Newdigate died on 4 January 1710 in London and was put to rest in his ancestral burial grounds at Harefield, passing all of his debts onto his eldest son.

== Footnotes ==
Baronetage of England
Preceded by Richard Newdigate	Baronet (of Arbury); 1678–1710	Succeeded by Richard Newdigate
