= Ladies Hall =

Girls school in London

Information
- Established: 1615
- Founder: Robert White
- Gender: Girls
- Language: English

Ladies Hall in Deptford, London is thought to have been the first girls' school in England. Founded in approximately 1615 by Robert White, the school was for aristocratic girls connected with the royal court, and they performed before Queen Anne in May 1617. The school taught basic reading and writing in English, and it is likely they covered other skills a lady was encouraged to acquire, in music, dance, and needlework. Archival evidence for the school and its pupils beyond the published text of Robert White's masque is sparse.

One of Anne Newdigate's daughters, Lettice Newdigate (1604-1625), attended the Ladies Hall or a school in Deptford in July 1617. Her portrait, aged 2, at Arbury Hall, is one of the earliest depictions of an English knot garden.

I. A. Shapiro doubted the existence of Ladies' Hall as a school, believing that it may simply have been where the young gentlewomen attending Anne of Denmark's ladies-in-waiting were housed, and that the ladies there had joined together to perform a play.

== Cupid's Banishment ==
A masque was produced by the young women of Ladies Hall at Greenwich Palace in 1617, during the absence of James VI and I in Scotland. The published text mentions that a Mistress Ann Watkins acted and spoke as Fortune. The queen's god-daughters presented her with embroideries, representing acorns for "A" and rosemary for "R", the initials of "Anna Regina".

One of the young women who danced in Robert White's Masque of Cupid's Banishment at Deptford in May 1617 was Anne Sandilands, thought to be a daughter of the Scottish courtier Sir James Sandilands of Slamannan Mure.

It has been suggested that it was subversive of the king's authority, after he refused to make Anna of Denmark regent in his absence.
