= Tim Boswell =

British politician (1942–2025)

The Right Honourable The Lord Boswell of Aynho DL FSA
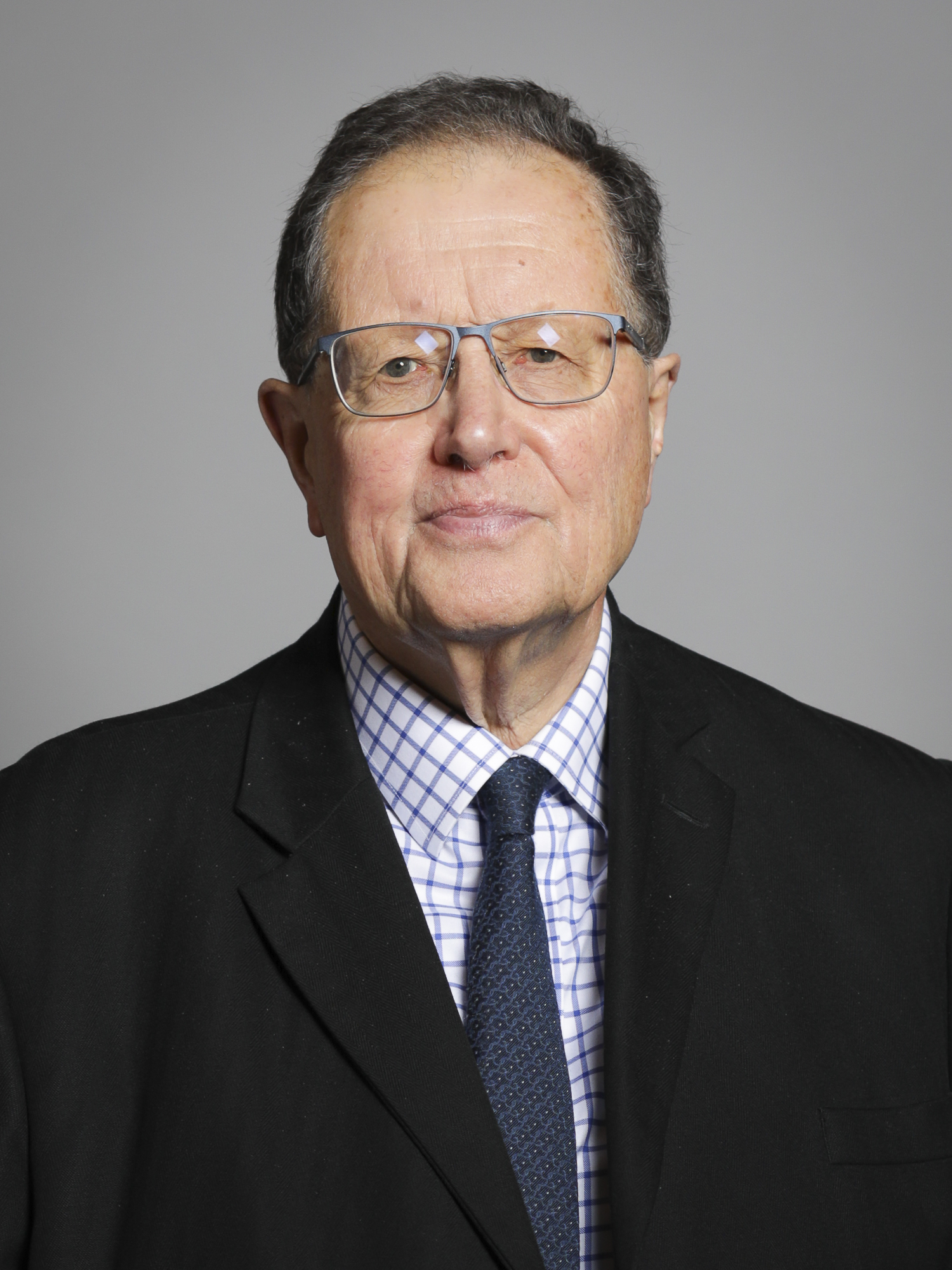
- Official portrait, 2019

Parliamentary Secretary to the Ministry of Agriculture, Fisheries and Food
- In office 5 July 1995 – 1 May 1997
- Prime Minister: John Major
- Preceded by: The Earl Howe
- Succeeded by: The Lord Donoughue

Parliamentary Under-Secretary of State for Education
- In office 19 December 1992 – 6 July 1995
- Prime Minister: John Major
- Preceded by: Nigel Forman
- Succeeded by: Robin Squire

Lord Commissioner of the Treasury
- In office 14 April 1992 – 11 December 1992
- Prime Minister: John Major
- Preceded by: Sydney Chapman
- Succeeded by: Timothy Kirkhope

Member of the House of Lords
- Lord Temporal
- Life peerage 8 July 2010 – 24 July 2025

Member of Parliament for Daventry
- In office 11 June 1987 – 12 April 2010
- Preceded by: Reg Prentice
- Succeeded by: Chris Heaton-Harris

Personal details
- Born: 2 December 1942 Brentwood, Essex, England
- Died: 30 August 2025 (aged 82)
- Party: Conservative
- Spouse: Helen Delahay Rees
- Children: 3, including Victoria Prentis
- Education: Marlborough College
- Alma mater: New College, Oxford
- Profession: Farmer and politician

Timothy Eric Boswell, Baron Boswell of Aynho DL (2 December 1942 – 30 August 2025) was a British politician who was the Conservative MP for Daventry from 1987 until he stood down at the 2010 general election, after which he was appointed to the House of Lords as a life peer.

== Background ==
The son of a farmer, Tim Boswell was educated at Marlborough College and New College, Oxford, where he obtained a degree in Classics and a diploma in agricultural economics.

Boswell was married to Helen Delahay Boswell, née Rees, for 50 years until her death in 2019. They had three daughters together including the former Conservative Member of Parliament Victoria Prentis.

Boswell died on 30 August 2025, at the age of 82.

== Political career ==
=== Conservative Party ===
Boswell joined the Conservative Research Department in 1966, becoming head of the economics section in 1974. He stood for Parliament at the February 1974 general election in Rugby but lost by 6,154 votes to Labour's William Price.

He was elected as the Treasurer of the Daventry Conservative Association in 1976 and subsequently its Chairman from 1979 to 1983. He became a political advisor to the Minister of Agriculture, Fisheries and Food Michael Jopling for two years from 1984.

=== House of Commons ===
Boswell was chosen to contest the Daventry constituency after the sitting Conservative MP Reg Prentice announced his retirement. He was elected as the Conservative MP for Daventry at the 1987 general election with a majority of 19,690 and held the safe seat comfortably until his retirement from the House of Commons.

Tim Boswell's Westminster career began unsurprisingly as a Member of the Agriculture Select committee in 1987. He became the Parliamentary Private Secretary to the Financial Secretary to the Treasury Peter Lilley in 1989. Tim Boswell entered John Major's government in 1990 as an Assistant Government Whip, following the 1992 general election he was promoted within the Whip's Office and became a Lord Commissioner to the Treasury.

In December 1992, Tim Boswell was appointed Parliamentary Under Secretary of State at the Department of Education and moved in the same position at the Ministry of Agriculture, Fisheries and Food until the Major government fell at the 1997 general election.

In opposition Boswell was a spokesman on the Treasury in the immediate aftermath of the 1997 election defeat and became a spokesman on Trade and Industry under William Hague, before speaking on Education and Employment in 1999 until after the 2001 general election. He became the spokesman for Work and Pensions under the leadership of Iain Duncan Smith, moving briefly to speak on Constitutional Affairs in 2003 under Michael Howard and back to Work and Pensions in 2004, where he remained following the 2005 general election.

On 31 March 2006, Boswell announced his intention not to contest the subsequent general election, provided it did not take place unexpectedly soon. The Daventry seat was split in two at the 2010 general election, with the northern portion becoming part of a new Daventry constituency and the southern part becoming part of a South Northamptonshire constituency.

In May 2009, he was listed by The Telegraph as one of the "Saints" (MPs who spent less money) in the expenses scandal.

After his retirement from the House of Commons the seat remained Conservative under Chris Heaton-Harris.

=== House of Lords ===
Boswell was raised to the House of Lords as a Conservative Life peer being created Baron Boswell of Aynho, of Aynho in the County of Northamptonshire on 8 July 2010. In May 2012, he resigned the Conservative whip after being made Principal Deputy Chairman of Committees in the House. He also became Chairman of the European Union Committee. He retired from the Lords on 24 July 2025.

== Honours ==
On 10 March 2016, Boswell was elected a Fellow of the Society of Antiquaries of London (FSA). He was appointed a deputy lieutenant of Northamptonshire in 2010.

Coat of arms of Tim Boswell
Crest In front of a demi South Devon bull Proper unguled and resting its dexter hoof on a seax point downwards Or a cornucopia Azure replenished with apricots Or. Escutcheon Or on a fess Gules between three owls affronty Azure each perched on a sprig of oak fesswise Vert three garbs Or banded Azure. Supporters On either side a South Devon Bull Proper armed and unguled Or. Motto Cresco Dum Disco (I Grow As I Learn)

Parliament of the United Kingdom
Preceded by Reg Prentice	Member of Parliament for Daventry; 1987–2010	Succeeded by Chris Heaton-Harris
