= Tomocomo =

Indigenous American holy man

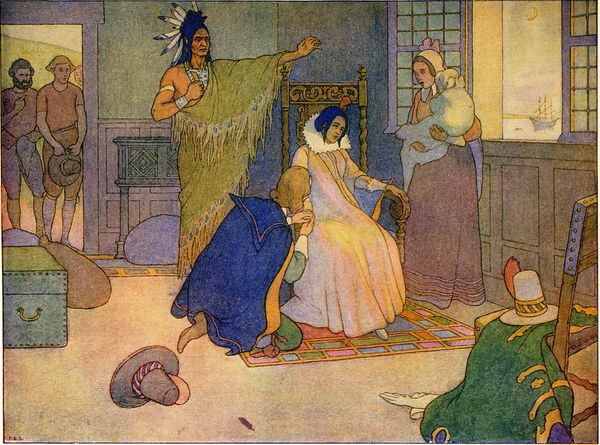
Tomocomo represented with Pocahontas in 1906 by Elmer Boyd Smith

Uttamatomakkin (known as Tomocomo for short) was a Powhatan holy man who accompanied Pocahontas when she was taken to London in 1616.

Little is known about Tomocomo's life before his visit to London. He appears to have met Captain John Smith during Smith's time in Virginia, since Smith says that in London they "renewed their acquaintance". His wife, Matachanna, was Pocahontas's half-sister.

Tomocomo must have been trusted by Chief Powhatan, as Powhatan requested him to accompany Pocahontas in order to count the number of people in England. Arriving at Plymouth, Tomocomo picked up a stick on which to mark notches to keep a tally, but soon grew "weary of that task". Powhatan also asked him to discover whether Smith was still alive. This was because they were told he was dead, but Pocahontas had told Smith that "your countrymen lie too much."

Samuel Purchas, a compiler of travel narratives, met Tomocomo at the home of "my good friend Doctor Goldstone, where he was a frequent guest, and where I have both seen him sing and dance his diabolical measures, and heard him discourse of his country and religion." Purchas believed that the Powhatan people were devil-worshippers and tried to persuade Tomocomo to take up Christianity, but Tomocomo said he was too old to learn new ways.

Pocahontas and Tomocomo were never given a formal audience before King James. However, on January 5, 1617 they were brought before the King at the Banqueting House in Whitehall Palace, at a performance of Ben Jonson's masque The Vision of Delight. According to Smith, both Pocahontas and Tomocomo did not realize whom they had met until it was explained to them afterward. Tomocomo was disappointed that the King did not offer a present, saying to Smith "You gave Powhatan a white dog, which Powhatan fed as himself, but your King gave me nothing, and I am better than your white dog."

When Tomocomo returned to Virginia with Samuel Argall and Rolfe in March 1617, he reportedly uttered diatribes "against England, English people" and against Thomas Dale, governor of Jamestown. The colonists rebutted his claims in front of the Powhatan leaders, and Tomocomo apparently was disgraced. However, Chief Powhatan died the next year, and his successor, Opechancanough, began planning a massive attack on the settlers. Nothing more is known of Tomocomo's life.

== Media ==
Paul O'Connor voiced him in the Animated Hero Classics 1994 episode Pocahontas. O'Connor also voiced Japazaws who lured the princess with a copper kettle to her abduction by Argall.

He was voiced by Brad Garrett in Disney's 1998 direct-to-video film Pocahontas II: Journey to a New World. At the end, he remained in London with John Rolfe's maid, Mrs. Jenkins.

In New Line Cinema's 2005 film The New World, Tomocomo is played by Raoul Trujillo. However, in the film's depiction of Pocahontas sailing on her trip to England, she is accompanied by her uncle Opechancanough rather than Tomocomo.
