= Maurice FitzRoy =

English cricketer (1897–1976)

Maurice Fitzroy
Personal information
- Full name: John Maurice FitzRoy
- Born: 20 March 1897; Chelsea, London, England
- Died: 7 May 1976 (aged 79); Nuneaton, Warwickshire, England
- Batting: Right-handed
- Relatives: Edward FitzRoy (father); Francis FitzRoy Newdegate, 3rd Viscount Daventry (son)

Domestic team information
- Years: Team
- 1925 to 1927: Northamptonshire

Career statistics
Competition	First-class
Matches	56
Runs scored	1373
Batting average	14.45
100s/50s	0/1
Top score	50
Balls bowled	143
Wickets	6
Bowling average	13.66
5 wickets in innings	0
10 wickets in match	0
Best bowling	4/14
Catches/stumpings	47/0
- Source: Cricinfo, 30 July 2015

John Maurice Fitzroy (20 March 1897 – 7 May 1976) was an English cricketer who played for Northamptonshire from 1925 to 1927.

He appeared in 56 first-class matches, all as Northamptonshire's captain. He was an attacking lower-order batsman who scored 1,373 runs with a highest score of 50 and took six wickets with a best performance of four for 14. He was also noted for his fielding.

Fitzroy was the youngest son of Edward FitzRoy, Speaker of the House of Commons from 1928 to his death in 1943. Maurice changed his surname to Fitzroy Newdegate in 1936. His wife Lucia, the daughter of Francis Newdegate, had inherited the Arbury Hall estate from her father, and changing the surname was part of the deal. Their son was Francis FitzRoy Newdegate, 3rd Viscount Daventry, who inherited from Maurice Fitzroy's oldest brother the viscountcy that had been granted in 1943 to Speaker FitzRoy's widow.
