= Francis FitzRoy Newdegate, 3rd Viscount Daventry =

British peer (1921–2000)

Francis Humphrey Maurice FitzRoy Newdegate, 3rd Viscount Daventry (17 December 1921 – 15 February 2000), was a British peer who was High Sheriff of Warwickshire during 1970 and Lord Lieutenant of Warwickshire from 1990 to 1997.

== Biography ==
Lord Daventry was the son of Commander Hon John Maurice FitzRoy Newdegate, youngest son of Edward FitzRoy and Muriel FitzRoy, 1st Viscountess Daventry. His mother was Lucia Charlotte Susan Newdigate Newdegate, heiress of Sir Francis Newdegate, of Arbury Hall, Warwickshire. His father took the additional surname of Newdegate and inherited the Arbury estates on the death of his father-in-law in 1936.

Lord Daventry came into the Arbury estates on the death of his father in 1976. He was High Sheriff of Warwickshire for 1970 and Lord Lieutenant of Warwickshire from 1990 to 1996. In 1986 he succeeded to the viscountcy on the death of his uncle, Oliver FitzRoy, 2nd Viscount Daventry.

In 1959 Lord Daventry married Hon. Rosemary Norrie, the daughter of Lt-Gen Lord Norrie. They had three children:

- James Edward FitzRoy Newdegate, 4th Viscount Daventry (born 27 July 1960)
- Hon Hugh Francis FitzRoy Newdegate (born 4 October 1962)
- Hon Joanna FitzRoy Newdegate (born 8 February 1964)

Lord Daventry died in 2000 and was succeeded in the peerage by his elder son.

== See also ==
- Newdigate baronets

Honorary titles
Preceded by Hugh Kenrick	High Sheriff of Warwickshire; 1970–1971	Succeeded by Sir William Dugdale, Bt
Preceded by Sir Charles Smith-Ryland	Lord Lieutenant of Warwickshire; 1990–1997	Succeeded by Martin Dunne
Peerage of the United Kingdom
Preceded by Oliver FitzRoy	Viscount Daventry; 1986–2000	Succeeded by James FitzRoy Newdegate
