= John Newdigate =

English politician (1600–1642)

John Newdigate (1600 – 29 November 1642) was an English politician and poet who sat in the House of Commons from 1628 to 1629.

== Life ==
Newdigate was the second child and eldest son of Sir John Newdigate of Arbury Hall, Chilvers Coton, Warwickshire and his wife Anne Fitton, eldest daughter of Sir Edward Fitton, 1st Baronet of Gawsworth in Cheshire. He was the brother of Sir Richard Newdigate, 1st Baronet. and succeeded his father in 1610, inheriting Arley Hall, which his financially embarrassed grandfather had accepted in exchange for the family seat at Harefield, Middlesex. He matriculated at Trinity College, Oxford on 6 November 1618, aged 18. He was a student of Gray's Inn and of the Inner Temple in 1620.

He was appointed High Sheriff of Warwickshire for 1625–26 and was a justice of the peace for the county from 1630 to 1636. In 1628, he was elected member of parliament for Liverpool and sat until 1629 when King Charles decided to rule without parliament for eleven years.

John Newdigate married Susanna, the daughter of Arnold Lulls a London goldsmith in 1621. The courtier Sir John Tonstal was a witness to the marriage settlement. Tonstal may have made an introduction between the apparently wealthy goldsmith and a gentry family in some financial difficulty. There were difficulties with the payment of the dowry to Newdigate, and a court case, suggesting that Lulls at this time was in financial difficulty himself. The couple lived at Ashtead, Arbury Hall, and after 1633 rented a house at Croydon. They were both friends of Gilbert Sheldon, who later became Archbishop of Canterbury.

Newdigate was very keen on drama and poetry and he write poetry himself. Some of his "strong lines" were written in praise of the ability of Jane Burdett of Foremark.

Newdigate died at the age of about 42 and was buried at Harefield. Newdigate had no surviving children and left the mortgaged Arbury estate to his brother Richard, who subsequently prospered to the degree that he was able to buy back the family's Harefield seat.

Parliament of England
Preceded by Edward Bridgeman; Thomas Stanley	Member of Parliament for Liverpool; 1628–1629; With: Henry Jermyn	Parliament suspended until 1640
