= The Vision of Delight =

Play

The Vision of Delight was a Jacobean era masque written by Ben Jonson. It was most likely performed on Twelfth Night, 6 January 1617 in the Banqueting House at Whitehall Palace, and repeated on 19 January that year.

The Vision of Delight was first published in the second folio collection of Jonson's works in 1641.

== Design ==
Scholarly consensus favors the view that the masque was designed by Inigo Jones, though there is no firm historical evidence.

The masque's music, composed by Nicholas Lanier, has unfortunately not survived, except for a setting for the final song.

== Newmarket ==
Prince Charles is said to have taken part in rehearsals for the masque at Newmarket Palace in November. Records show that the Newmarket rehearsals took place over 50 days.

John Chamberlain wrote that the dancers included the Marquises of Buckingham and Hamilton, the Earl of Montgomery, and other lords, with Sir Gilbert Hoghton, Abercromby, Auchmouty, Hodges, Palmer, and other dancing companions.

== Pocahontas ==
The masque's first performance on 6 January 1617 was attended by the Native Americans Pocahontas and Tomocomo, two months before Pocahontas's untimely death. Lady Anne Clifford, Lady Ruthin, the Countess of Pembroke and the Countess of Arundel watched the masque together from a box.

== Buckingham ==
The masque was connected with George Villiers, 1st Duke of Buckingham, the favorite of King James I. The Vision of Delight was performed on the day Villiers received his title as Earl (later Duke) of Buckingham. Buckingham had sponsored Jonson's masque The Gypsies Metamorphosed (1621); he had also danced in Pleasure Reconciled to Virtue (1618).

== The show ==
The Vision of Delight has been regarded as almost a prototypical or quintessential example of the masque; it features the mythological figures and personifications of abstractions that are standard for the form. The work opens with personifications of Delight, Harmony, Grace, Love, Laughter, Revel, Sport, and Wonder; they are later joined by the ancient Greek deities Zephyrus and Aurora. Jonson's verse, heralding the coming of Spring, is lush and vibrant; the nineteenth-century critic and editor William Gifford called the masque "one of the most beautiful of Jonson's little pieces, light, airy, harmonious, and poetical in no common degree. It stands without parallel among performances of this kind...." Two anti-masques feature comical figures of "pantaloons" and "phantasms," followed by the more serious portion of the work in which the aristocratic masquers descend from a Bower of Spring to dance their dances. The effect is one of "glowing idealism."

Orazio Busino, chaplain of the Venetian ambassador Piero Contarini, gave a description of the jewels and costume of aristocratic women and ladies in waiting in the audience;

every box was filled notably with most noble and richly arrayed ladies, in number some 600 and more according to the general estimate; the dresses being of such variety in cut and colour as to be indescribable; the most delicate plumes over their heads, springing from their foreheads or in their hands serving as fans; strings of jewels on their necks and bosoms and in their girdles and apparel in such quantity that they looked like so many queens, so that at the beginning, with but little light, such as that of the dawn or of the evening twilight, the splendour of their diamonds and other jewels was so brilliant that they looked like so many stars ... The dress peculiar to these ladies is very handsome ... behind it hangs wellnigh from the neck down to the ground, with long, close sleeves and waist ... The farthingale also plays its part. The plump and buxom display their bosoms very liberally, and those who are lean go muffled up to the throat. All wear men's shoes or at least very low slippers. They consider the mask as indispensable for their face as bread at table, but they lay it aside willingly at these public entertainments".

One passage in Jonson's text has been cited by critics as influencing John Milton's poem Il Penseroso.

== Sources ==
Despite its evanescent surface appearance (one commentator has called the work "a masque about masques"), Jonson's text is not without intellectual weight; Jonson based his masque on traditional dream theory, relying most likely on the Commentarii in Somnium Scipionis, Macrobius's study of the Dream of Scipio by Cicero. Jonson treats the audience of the performance as an assemblage of dreamers, and through his masque illustrates Macrobius's categories of dreams.
