= Griff, Warwickshire =

Hamlet in Warwickshire, England

Coordinates: 52.49775°N 1.47704°W

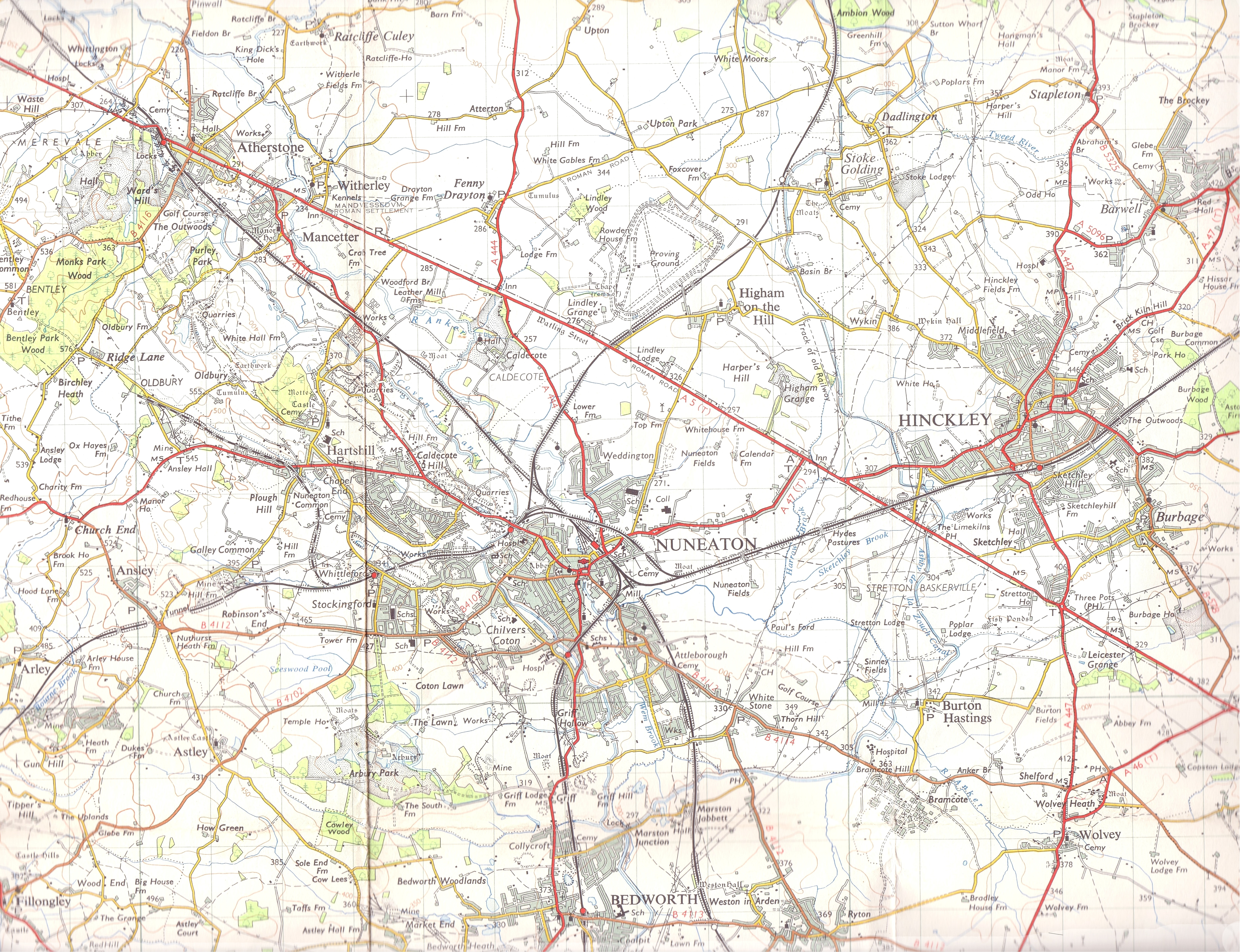
A 1961 1 inch = 1 mile series map, covering Hinckley, Nuneaton, part of Bedworth, Atherstone, Ansley, Burton Hastings, Hartshill and Wolvey

Griff is a hamlet in the Nuneaton and Bedworth district of Warwickshire, England. The hamlet lies between the towns of Nuneaton and Bedworth on the B4113 road, formerly the A444 until bypassed.

Formerly a coal mining area there is evidence that coal was obtained from Griff from as early as the twelfth century. Griff Quarry produces 260,000 tonnes (290,000 tons) of aggregate annually.

Mary Ann Evans (George Eliot) was brought up at Griff House, now a hotel. Griff is likely represented in Eliot's novel Middlemarch as "Frick", which is described as "[Mr Solomon's] side of Lowick was the most remote from the village, and the houses of the labouring people were either lone cottages or were collected in a hamlet called Frick, where a water-mill and some stone-pits made a little centre of slow, heavy-shouldered industry."
