= Sir Richard Newdigate, 1st Baronet =

Member of the Parliament of England

Sir Richard Newdigate, 1st Baronet (17 September 1602 – 14 October 1678) was an English judge, landowner and politician who sat in the House of Commons from 1660.

== Family ==
Richard Newdigate was a younger son of Sir John Newdigate (5 March 1571 – 28 March 1610) of Arbury Hall, Chilvers Coton, Warwickshire, and his wife, Anne Fitton, the elder daughter of Sir Edward Fitton, baronet, of Gawsworth, Cheshire, by Alice Holcroft (d.1627). He was the grandson of John Newdigate (1541 – 22 February 1592), esquire, of Harefield, Middlesex, and Martha Cave (24 February 1546 – 22 November 1575), the daughter and co-heir of Anthony Cave.

== Career ==
Matriculating at Trinity College, Oxford, on 6 November 1618, he left the university without a degree, and entered in 1620 Gray's Inn, where he was called to the bar in 1628, elected an ancient in 1645, and a bencher in 1649. He was High Steward of the Royal Town of Sutton Coldfield from 1646 until his death.

Newdigate was counsel with William Prynne and John Bradshaw on behalf of the state in the proceedings taken against Connor Maguire, 2nd Baron of Enniskillen, and other Irish rebels in 1644–5. He was also one of the counsel for the eleven members impeached by Thomas Fairfax in June 1647.

On 9 February 1653–54, he was called to the degree of serjeant-at-law, and on 31 May following was made a justice of the upper bench, in which capacity he was placed on the special commission for the trial of the Yorkshire insurgents on 5 April 1655. He declined to serve, on the ground that levying war against the Lord Protector Oliver Cromwell was not within the statute of treason; and in consequence was removed from his place (3 May), and resumed practice at the bar. He was, however, reinstated before 26 June 1657, when he attended, as justice of the upper bench, the ceremony of the reinvestiture of the Protector in Westminster Hall.

Newdigate was continued in office during Richard Cromwell's protectorate; and after his abdication, on 17 January 1660 was advanced to be Lord Chief Justice. Anticipating his dismissal on the Restoration, he had himself to return to the Convention parliament. On 5 April 1660 he was among the "old serjeants remade" and was, briefly, in 1660, MP for Tamworth, Staffordshire.

1675 added the Warwickshire manor of Arbury to his holdings. He had succeeded in 1642, on the death of his elder brother, to that of Harefield, Middlesex, the ancient seat of his family, which had been alienated in the preceding century by his grandfather, a debtor, in a deal for Arbury with Edmund Anderson. On 24 July 1677, a baronetcy was conferred on him by Charles II without payment of the ordinary fees.

Newdigate died at Harefield Manor on 14 October 1678, and was buried in Harefield parish church, where a monument was raised to his memory. The monument was designed and created by William Stanton.

== Family ==
Newdigate married, in 1631, Juliana, daughter of Sir Francis Leigh, K.B., of King's Newnham, Warwickshire, and had issue six sons and five daughters. He was succeeded by his eldest surviving son, Sir Richard Newdigate, 2nd Baronet (d. 1710), whose son, Sir Richard, third baronet, was father of Sir Roger Newdigate.

== Footnotes ==
Parliament of England
Preceded by Tobias Bridge; Edward Keeling	Member of Parliament for Tamworth; 1660–1661; With: Thomas Fox	Succeeded by Amos Walrond; John Swinfen
Legal offices
Preceded by Sir John Glynne	Lord Chief Justice; 1660	Succeeded by Sir Robert Foster
Honorary titles
Preceded by The Earl of Essex	High Steward of Sutton Coldfield; 1646–1678	Succeeded by Thomas Thynne
Baronetage of England
New title	Baronet (of Arbury); 1677–1678	Succeeded by Richard Newdigate
