= Roger Newdigate =

English politician

Sir Roger Newdigate Bt
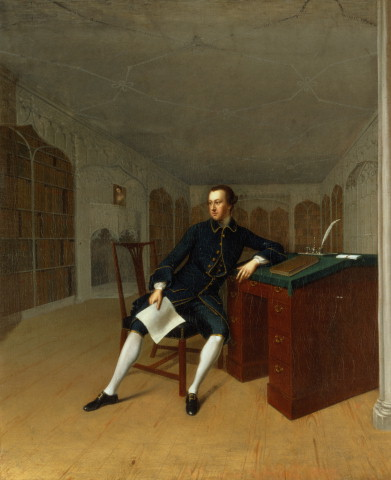
- Sir Roger Newdigate in the Library at Arbury by Arthur Devis

Member of Parliament for Oxford University
- In office 1751–1780
- Preceded by: Henry Hyde
- Succeeded by: William Dolben

Member of Parliament for Middlesex
- In office 1742–1747
- Preceded by: William Pulteney
- Succeeded by: William Beauchamp-Proctor

Personal details
- Born: Roger Newdigate; 30 May 1719 Arbury, Warwickshire, England
- Died: 23 November 1806 (aged 87) Arbury, Warwickshire, England
- Party: Tory
- Spouses: Sophia Conyers (m. 1743; died 1774) Hester Mundy (m. 1776; died 1800)
- Education: University College, Oxford
- Profession: Politician, architect

Sir Roger Newdigate, 5th Baronet (30 May 1719 – 23 November 1806) was an English politician who sat in the House of Commons between 1742 and 1780. He was a collector of antiquities.

== Early life ==
Newdigate was born in Arbury, Warwickshire, the son of Sir Richard Newdigate, 3rd Baronet (who died in 1727) and inherited the title 5th Baronet and the estates of Arbury and of Harefield in Middlesex on the early death of his brother in 1734. He was educated at Westminster School and University College, Oxford, where he matriculated in 1736, and graduated M.A. in 1738; he contributed greatly to the university throughout the remainder of his life. He is best remembered as the founder of the Newdigate Prize on his death and as a collector of antiques, a number of which he donated to the university. The prize for poetry helped make the names of many illustrious writers.

== Political career ==
From 1742 until 1747, he served as Member of Parliament (MP) for Middlesex, and in 1751, he began a 30-year tenure as an MP for Oxford University.

In 1759 he was commissioned as Major of the Warwickshire Militia and served with the regiment during its embodiment for home defence during the Seven Years' War, keeping a diary of his service.

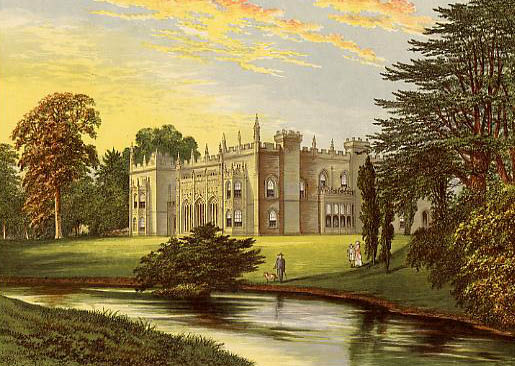
Arbury Hall c. 1880

He lavished attention on the Elizabethan Arbury Hall which he rebuilt over a period of thirty years in splendid Gothic Renaissance style, engaging the services of the architect Henry Couchman.

== Private life ==
He married, firstly Sophia Conyers in 1743, and secondly Hesther Margaret Munday in 1776. Both marriages were childless and on his death in 1806 the baronetcy became extinct. Arbury Hall and Harefield passed to Francis Parker (1774–1862) of Kirk Hallam, Derbyshire, a distant cousin of the 5th Baronet, who then adopted the additional name of Newdigate. Francis Parker moved into Arbury Hall and married Lady Barbara Maria Legge, daughter of George Legge, 3rd Earl of Dartmouth, in 1820.

== Legacy ==
Sir Roger was immortalised in fiction in George Eliot's Scenes of Clerical Life, where he appears as Sir Christopher Cheverel in Mr Gilfil's Love Story.

Parliament of Great Britain
Preceded by William Pulteney; Sir Hugh Smithson, Bt	Member of Parliament for Middlesex; 1742–1747; With: Sir Hugh Smithson, Bt	Succeeded by Sir Hugh Smithson, Bt; Sir William Beauchamp-Proctor, Bt
Preceded by Viscount Cornbury; Peregrine Palmer	Member of Parliament for Oxford University; 1751–1780; With: Peregrine Palmer 1751–1762; Sir Walter Bagot, Bt 1762–1768; Sir William Dolben, Bt 1768; Francis Page 1768–1780	Succeeded by Francis Page; Sir William Dolben, Bt
Baronetage of England
Preceded by Edward Newdigate	Baronet (of Arbury); 1734–1806	Extinct
