= Arbury Hall =

Country house & estate in England

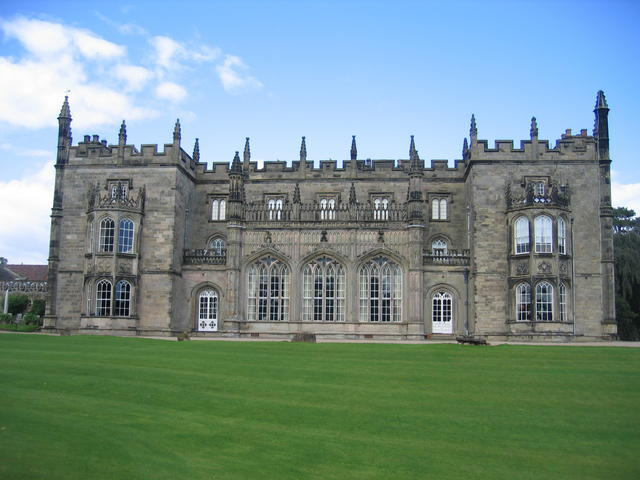
- South front of Arbury Hall
- Interactive map of Arbury Hall
- 52.50029°N 1.50754°W
- Location: Nuneaton, Warwickshire, England
- OS grid reference: SP335893

Listed Building – Grade I
- Official name: Arbury Hall
- Designated: 6 December 1947
- Reference no.: 1185222

Listed Building – Grade I
- Official name: Stables at Arbury Hall and attached wall and gate pier to left
- Designated: 1 January 1956
- Reference no.: 1299708

Listed Building – Grade II*
- Official name: North Lodge, Arbury Hall
- Designated: 6 December 1947
- Reference no.: 1034973

Listed Building – Grade II*
- Official name: The Tea House
- Designated: 11 February 1988
- Reference no.: 1299615

Listed Building – Grade II
- Official name: Coach house and attached walls at Arbury Hall
- Designated: 11 February 1988
- Reference no.: 1365022

National Register of Historic Parks and Gardens
- Official name: Arbury Hall
- Type: Grade II*
- Designated: 1 February 1986
- Reference no.: 1001185

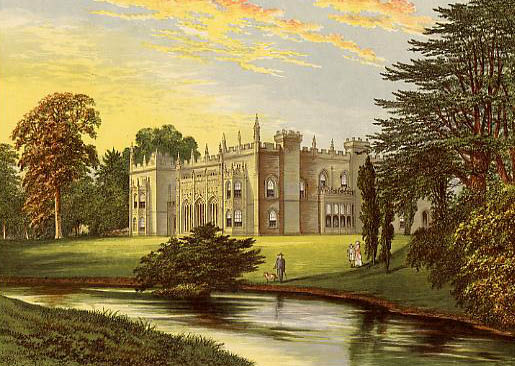
Arbury Hall circa 1880

Arbury Hall is a Grade I listed country house in Nuneaton, Warwickshire, England, and the ancestral home of the Newdigate family, later the Newdigate-Newdegate and Fitzroy-Newdegate (Viscount Daventry) families.

== History ==
The hall is built on the site of the former Arbury Priory in a mixture of Tudor and 18th-century Gothic Revival architecture, the latter being the work of Sir Roger Newdigate from designs by Henry Keene.

The 19th-century author George Eliot (Mary Anne Evans) was born on one of the estate farms in 1819, the daughter of the estate's land agent.

In 1911, Sir Francis Alexander Newdigate Newdegate erected, at Arbury Hall, a monument to the memory of George Eliot.

== Description ==
The hall is set in 300 acres (121 ha) of parkland.

== In the arts ==
George Eliot immortalised Arbury Hall as "Cheverel Manor" in Scenes of Clerical Life, where it is the setting for "Mr Gilfil's Love Story".

The film Angels & Insects (1995) was shot entirely at Arbury Hall and within the grounds.

Arbury Hall was also used as the fictional Hoxley Manor in the BBC TV series Land Girls (2009).

== Ownership ==
- Edmund Anderson (1530–1605), who demolished the priory and built Arbury Hall.

Custodians of Arbury Hall include:

- Sir Edmund Anderson (1567–1586)
- John Newdegate (1586–1587)
- Sir John Newdegate (1587–1610)
- John Newdigate (1610–1642)
- Sir Richard Newdigate, 1st Baronet (1642–1665)
- Sir Richard Newdigate, 2nd Baronet (1665–1710)
- Sir Richard Newdigate, 3rd Baronet (1710–1727)
- Sir Edward Newdigate, 4th Baronet (1727–1734)
- Sir Roger Newdigate, 5th Baronet (1734–1806)
- Francis Parker Newdigate (1806–1835)
- Charles Newdigate Newdegate (1835–1887)
- Lt Gen. Sir Edward Newdigate-Newdegate (1887–1902)
- Sir Francis Alexander Newdigate-Newdegate (1902–1936)
- The Hon. Mrs Lucia FitzRoy-Newdegate (1936–1950)
- Francis Humphrey Maurice FitzRoy Newdegate, 3rd Viscount Daventry (1950–2000)
- James Edward FitzRoy Newdegate, 4th Viscount Daventry (2000–)

== See also ==
- Arbury Canals
- Arbury Park, South Australia, named after Arbury Hall
