= Profumo =

Profumo may refer to

== People ==
- Albert Profumo (1879–1940), English barrister
- Alessandro Profumo (born 1957), Italian banker, CEO of Gruppo Unicredit
- David Profumo (born 1955), English novelist
- Francesco Profumo (born 1953), Dean of the Engineering Faculty of the Politecnico di Torino
- John Profumo (1915–2006), British politician
- Stefano Profumo (born 1978), Italian-American Physicist

== Titles ==
- Baron Profumo of the Kingdom of Sardinia

== Other ==
- Profumo (album), an album released by Italian singer Gianna Nannini in 1986.
