= Albert Profumo =

English barrister (1879–1940)

Captain Baron Albert Profumo KC FRAM(Hon) OCI 4th Baron Profumo of the Kingdom of Sardinia
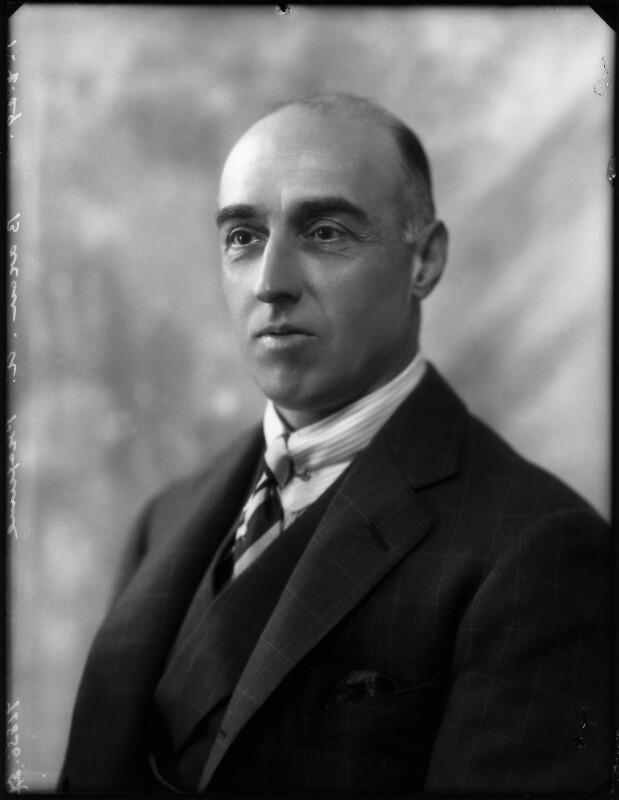
- Albert Profumo in 1929
- Born: Alberto Pier Antonio Profumo; 20 April 1879; Lambeth, London, England
- Died: 27 March 1940 (aged 60); Avon Dassett, Warwickshire, England
- Resting place: Golders Green Crematorium, London; 51°34′38″N 000°11′37″W
- Education: Magdalen College, Oxford
- Occupations: Barrister; philanthropist
- Organizations: Middle Temple; Inner Temple
- Title: Baron
- Political party: Conservative
- Board member of: Italian Hospital, London; Royal Academy of Music
- Spouse: Martha Thom Kennedy Walker (m. 1906)
- Children: 5, including John, 5th Baron Profumo
- Parents: Joseph Profumo (father); Annie Lewis Mills (mother)
- Relatives: Antonio Profumo, 1st Baron Profumo (great-great-grandfather); Harold Balfour, 1st Baron Balfour of Inchrye (son-in-law); David Profumo, 6th Baron Profumo (grandson)
- Family: Profumo

Don Albert Peter Anthony Profumo, 4th Baron Profumo of the Kingdom of Sardinia (born Alberto Pier Antonio Profumo; 20 April 1879 – 27 March 1940) was an English barrister and philanthropist. He was the father of John Profumo, former British minister and the key subject of the Profumo affair.

== Early life and education ==
Profumo was born in the London suburb of Lambeth in 1879 to Italian-born father Joseph Profumo and his wife Annie Lewis Mills. Profumo was educated at the City of London School from 1893 to 1895, before continuing his education overseas.

== Legal education and career ==
Between 1899 and 1901, Profumo undertook his legal education exams in a range of subjects including Roman Law, Constitutional and Legal History, supervised by the Council of Legal Education. Following the completion of his legal education in 1901, Profumo was called to the Bar as a practicing Barrister by the Inner Temple. In April 1919, Profumo was appointed by George V as a King's Counsel (also known as "taking silk"), an honour giving him certain rights and privileges in the courts.

During the Great War, Profumo served in the 1st Battalion of the County of London Volunteer Regiment with the rank of Captain.

== Politics ==
In the 1906 general election, Profumo unsuccessfully contested the High Peak constituency for the Conservative Party receiving 46% of the vote, narrowly missing out to incumbent Liberal Member of Parliament, Oswald Partington. In 1909, when Partington was appointed as a Junior Lord of the Treasury, Parliamentary rules required that he seek re-election; therefore the High Peak by-election was held on 22 July 1909, with Profumo receiving just over 48% of the vote, again narrowly losing to the Partington.

== Memberships and philanthropy ==
Profumo was involved in many causes, groups and organisations throughout his life, making considerable donations to these causes. In 1919, Profumo donated £5,000 each to Gray's Inn and the Inner Temple, two of the four Inns of Court in England, for purposes of legal education.In 1924, on the establishment of the University of Birmingham's Faculty of Law, Profumo donated funds to establish the Law Library, and in 1926, he provided funding for the Council of Legal Education to provide voice production and elocution lessons for students who had passed their legal examinations.

Profumo served as a member of the Italian Hospital's Committee of Management and Financial Committee, making a number of donations during his tenure. Profumo received his Order of the Crown of Italy for his services to the hospital. On his death, his place on the Committee of Management was taken by his son, John Profumo.

Profumo was also considered a generous benefactor and patron to the "Art of Music". He was appointed a Director of the Royal Academy of Music in 1937, and also an Honorary Fellow of the Royal Academy of Music (FRAM(Hon)). Shortly before his death, Profumo established the Baron Albert Profumo Fund, as a permanent memorial providing scholarships to Academy students.

Profumo was a Freemason, belonging to the United Grand Lodge of England. He was also President of the Horton General Hospital.

== Personal life and family ==
Profumo's family originated from Genoa in the Kingdom of Sardinia (present-day Italy). His great-great-grandfather, Antonio Profumo, was the first Mayor of Genoa, a Senator in the Sardinian Subalpine Senate, and later made the 1st Baron Profumo of the Kingdom of Sardinia, a title Albert would inherit from his father.

His father, Joseph Profumo (born Giuseppe Profumo, 1849–1911), emigrated from Italy to England, where he was managing director of the Provident Association of London, a London-based life insurance and pensions company.

Profumo died in March 1940 in his home at Avon Dassett in Warwickshire at the age of 60, and his memorial and cremation took place on 30 March 1940, with his ashes interred at a memorial in the Golders Green Cemetery.

Profumo and his wife, Martha, had five children:

- Elizabeth Josephine Profumo (1910–1986);
- Baroness Mary Ainslie Balfour (1911–1999);
- Peter Alexander Kennedy Profumo (1912–1913);
- John Dennis Profumo (1915–2006) – a notable Conservative politician and key figure in the Profumo affair, whose son David is a prominent author;
- Major Philip Profumo (1919–1986).

== Barony and honours ==
=== Barony ===
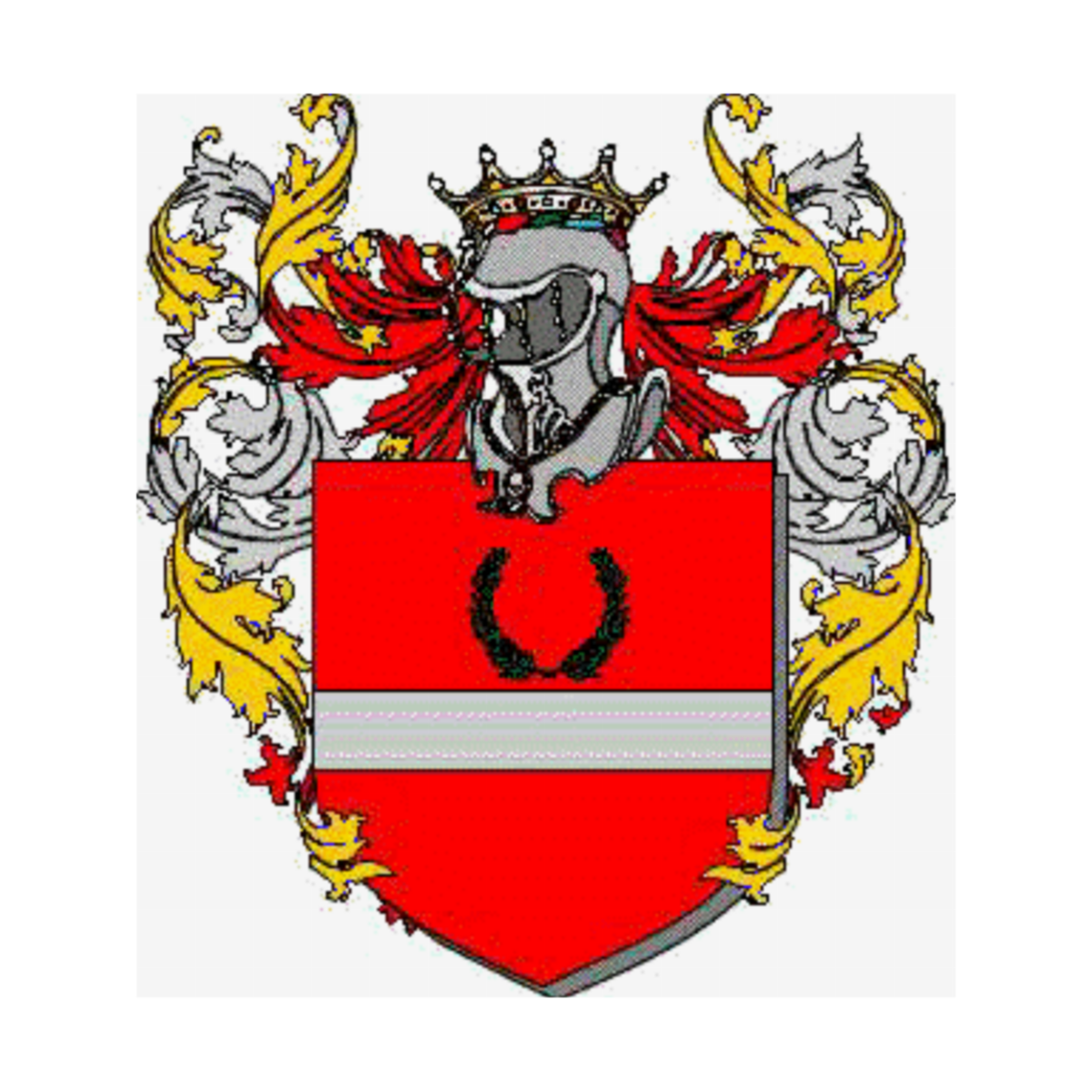
Arms of the Barony Profumo of the Kingdom of Sardinia

In 1843, a Barony was granted to the Profumo family; and in 1911, on the death of his father, Profumo inherited the Profumo Barony, with the style, 4th Baron Profumo of the Kingdom of Sardinia. Upon his death in 1852, his son Pietro Profumo became the 2nd Baron Profumo.

- 4th Baron Profumo of the Kingdom of Sardinia (4° Barone Profumo del Regno di Sardegna) (1911)

=== National honours ===
In 1937, for his services to the Italian Hospital in London, Profumo was appointed by the King of Italy, Victor Emmanuel III, as a Commander of the Order of the Crown of Italy.

- Commander of the Order of the Crown of Italy (Commendatore dell'Ordine della Corona d'Italia) (1937)

== See also ==
- Baron Profumo
- John Profumo
- Profumo affair
- Antonio Profumo
