= Antonio Profumo =

Italian politician (1788–1852)

Baron Antonio Profumo 1st Baron Profumo of the Kingdom of Sardinia

Senator of the Kingdom of Sardinia
- In office 19 December 1849 – 20 October 1852
- Monarch: Victor Emmanuel II

1st Mayor of Genoa
- In office 15 March 1849 – 22 December 1851

President of the Commercial Court of Genoa
- In office 1843–1846

Judge of the Commercial Court of Genoa
- In office 1840–1846

Personal details
- Born: 10 September 1788 Genoa, Republic of Genoa
- Died: October 20, 1852 (aged 64) Genoa, Kingdom of Sardinia
- Party: Historical Right
- Spouse: Teresa Boccardo
- Relations: John Profumo (3rd Great-grandson)
- Children: Pietro Profumo, 2nd Baron Profumo
- Parents: Peter Francis Profumo (father); Rose (mother)
- Profession: Merchant, politician, judicial officer

Don Antonio Profumo, 1st Baron Profumo of the Kingdom of Sardinia (10 September 1788 - 20 October 1852), was an Italian politician, judicial officer and merchant, who served as the first Mayor of Genoa and a Senator in the Kingdom of Sardinia's Subalpine Senate.

== Biography ==
Antonio Profumo was born in Genoa in the Republic of Genoa to Rose and Peter Profumo.

Profumo's early career was as a merchant in Genoa, later being appointed as a judge of the Genoa Commercial Court in 1840, and the President of the Court between 1843 and 1846; during which he introduced important reforms and reduced the backlog of cases, benefiting other merchants and state treasury funds. In March 1849, Profumo was elected as the first Mayor of Genoa (Sindaco di Genova), serving until 1851. In later life, Profumo was a member and President of the Chamber of Commerce of Genoa and President of the Administrative Commission of the Monte di Pietà of the same city.

Later in December 1849, Profumo was appointed by Victor Emmanuel II, the King of Sardinia as a Senator in the Kingdom's Subalpine Senate for "eminent services" to the Fatherland, and as a person who had paid "three thousand lire in direct taxation". Profumo remained a Senator until his death in 1852.

In 1851, Profumo bought Castello di Castelguelfo, and following his death, his son Pietro Profumo inherited the castle. The castle remained in the family until 1866, when it was repossessed by expropriation by the Parma Court after Pietro fled Italy for England, following a charge and sentencing to death for poisoning a colleague in 1858.

Antonio Profumo is the Great-great-great grandfather of British politician John Profumo, famous for the Profumo affair.

== Barony and honours ==
=== Barony ===
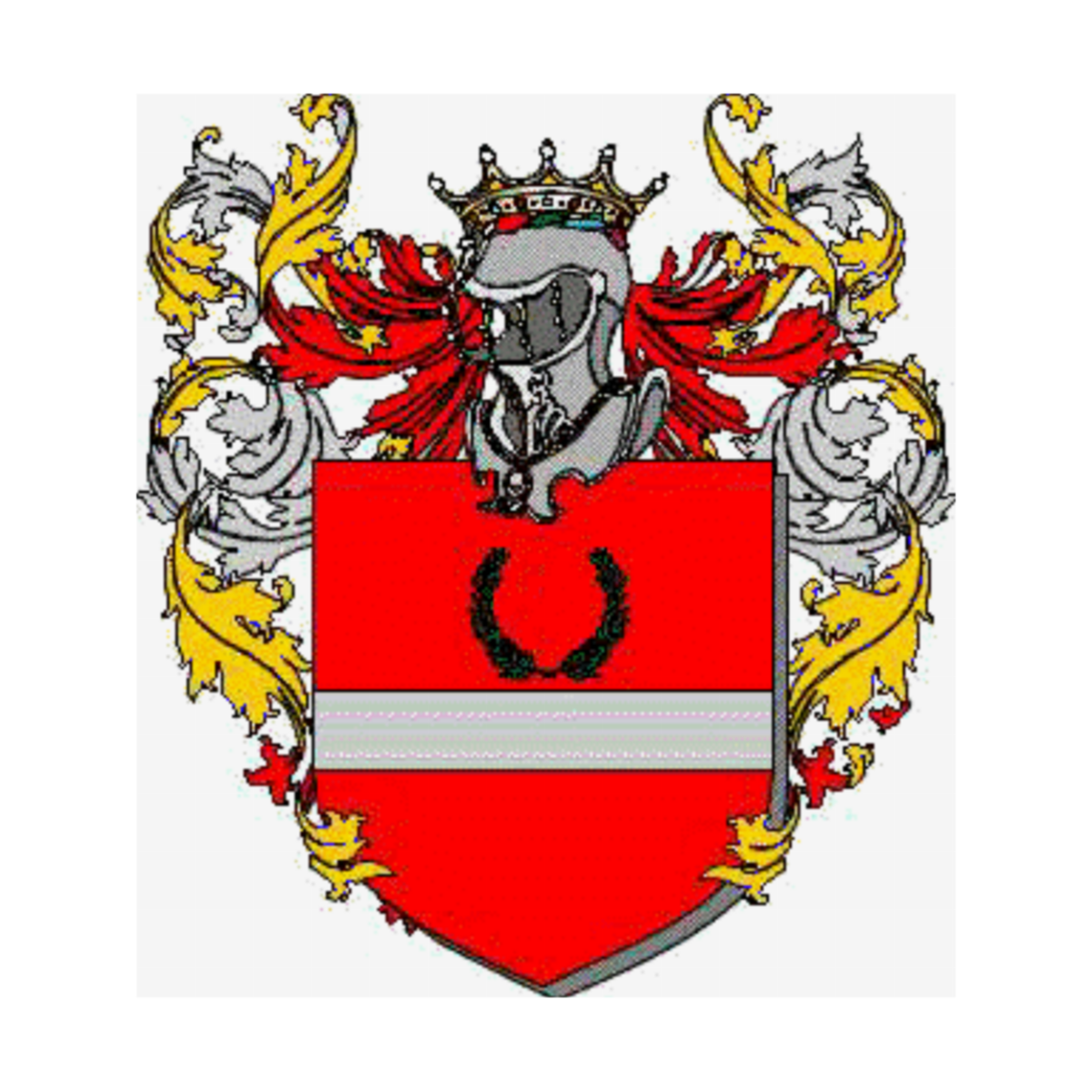
Arms of the Barony Profumo of the Kingdom of Sardinia

In 1843, Charles Albert, the King of Sardinia appointed Profumo as a Baron of the Kingdom of Sardinia (Barone del Regno di Sardegna), with the titular name of Antonio, 1st Baron Profumo of the Kingdom of Sardinia. Upon his death in 1852, his son Pietro Profumo became the 2nd Baron Profumo.

Baron of the Kingdom of Sardinia - ribbon for ordinary uniform

Baron of the Kingdom of Sardinia
— 3 November 1843

=== National honours ===
In addition to his ennoblement as a Baron, Profumo was appointed a Knight of the Order of Saints Maurice and Lazarus and a Commander of the Order in 1849.

Knight of the Order of Saints Maurice and Lazarus - ribbon for ordinary uniform

Knight of the Order of Saints Maurice and Lazarus
— 1824

Commander Order of Saints Maurice and Lazarus - ribbon for ordinary uniform

Commander Order of Saints Maurice and Lazarus
— 3 August 1849

== See also ==
- Baron Profumo
- Mayor of Genoa
- John Profumo
