= Baron Profumo =

Title of nobility in Sardinia and Italy

Baron Profumo of the Kingdom of Sardinia
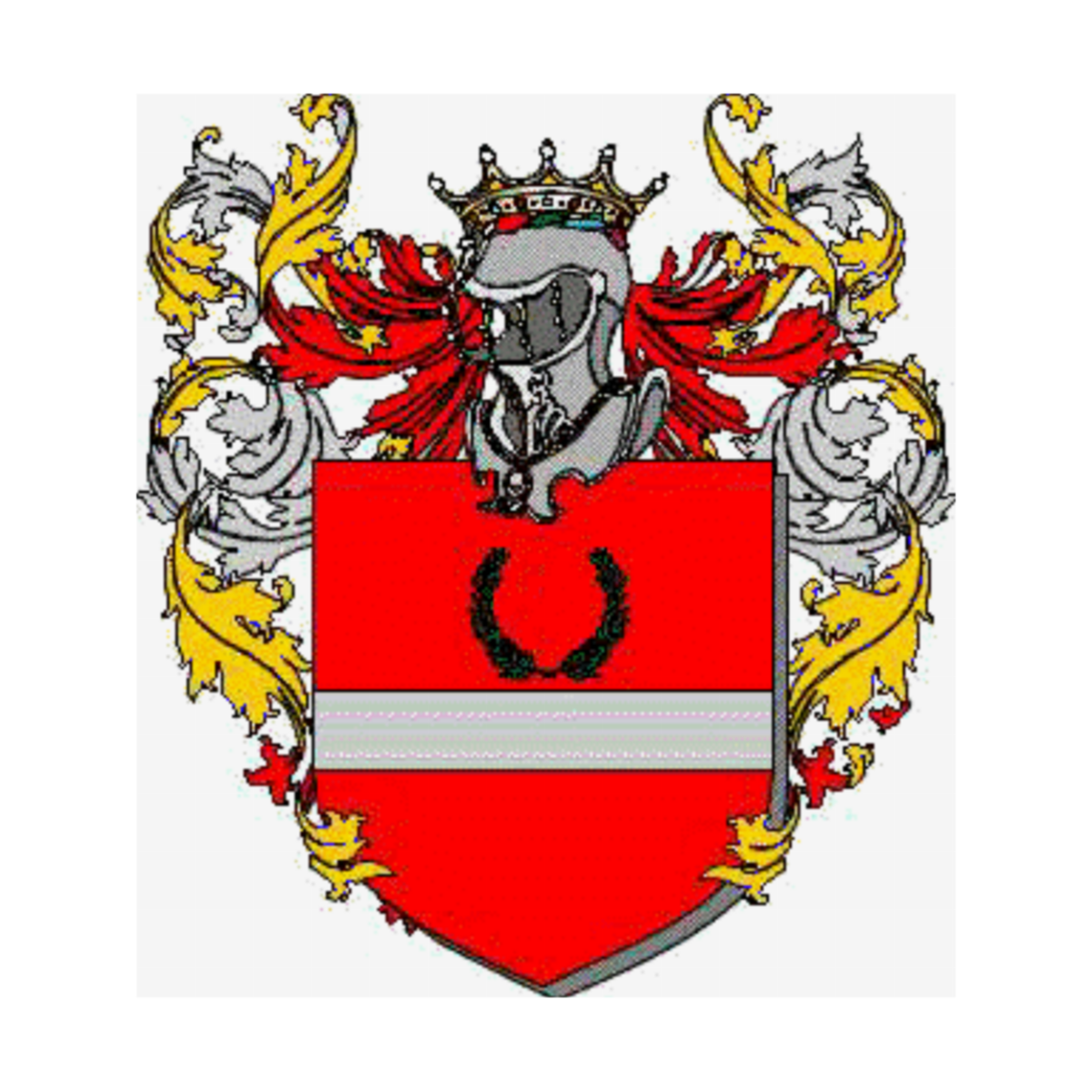
- Crest of the Barony Profumo of the Kingdom of Sardinia
- Creation date: 30 November 1843
- Created by: Charles Albert
- Peerage: Kingdom of Sardinia; Kingdom of Italy
- First holder: Antonio Profumo
- Present holder: David John Profumo
- Heir apparent: Alexander James Profumo
- Remainder to: the 1st Baron's male heirs of the body lawfully begotten
- Status: Extant
- Former seat: Castello di Castelguelfo (1851-1866)

Baron Profumo of the Kingdom of Sardinia was a title in the nobility of the Kingdom of Sardinia and later the Kingdom of Italy. It was created by Charles Albert, King of Sardinia, on 30 November 1843 for Antonio Profumo, a Genoese merchant and politician who was President of the Tribunal of Commerce in Genoa.

The best known Baron Profumo was the British politician John Profumo, who inherited the title from his father in 1940, but did not use the title after the Speaker of the House of Commons would not recognise the title. In addition, Italian noble titles were no longer recognised in Italy after 1948.

The Profumo family home Castello di Castelguelfo, was bought by Antoni Profumo in 1851, and following his death, his son Pietro Profumo inherited the castle. The castle remained in the family until 1866, when it was repossessed by expropriation by the Parma Court after Pietro fled Italy for England, following a charge and sentencing to death for poisoning a colleague in 1858.

== Barons Profumo ==
=== Antonio Profumo, 1st Baron Profumo ===
- Antonio Profumo, 1st Baron Profumo (1788–1852), was an Italian politician, judicial officer and merchant, who served as the first Mayor of Genoa and a Senator in the Kingdom of Sardinia’s Subalpine Senate.

=== Pietro Profumo, 2nd Baron Profumo ===
- Pietro Profumo, 2nd Baron Profumo (also known as Louis Profumo, 1815-1867), was an Italian financier and noble. Profumo fled to London in 1858 after he was charged and sentenced to death for poisoning a colleague. He died at his London home in 1867 at the age of 52.

=== Joseph Profumo, 3rd Baron Profumo ===
- Joseph Alexander Profumo, 3rd Baron Profumo (born Giuseppe Alessandro Profumo, 1849–1911) was an Italian-British financier and businessman, who was naturalised a British subject in 1885. He married Annie Lewis Mills in 1875 and divorced in 1885. He married a second time, to Rose Adams, in 1890. Joseph died at the Le Grand Hotel in Paris in 1911.

=== Albert Profumo, 4th Baron Profumo ===
- Alberto Pier Anthony Profumo KC FRAM(Hon) OCI, 4th Baron Profumo (born Albert Pier Antonio Profumo, 1879–1940) was an English barrister and philanthropist.

=== John Profumo, 5th Baron Profumo ===
- John Dennis Profumo, 5th Baron Profumo (1915-2006), was a British politician whose career ended in 1963 after a sexual relationship with the 19-year-old model Christine Keeler in 1961. The scandal, which became known as the Profumo affair, led to his resignation from the Conservative government of Harold Macmillan.

=== David Profumo, 6th Baron Profumo ===
- David John Profumo FRSL, 6th Baron Profumo (born 20 October 1955), is an English novelist.

=== Alexander Profumo, Heir apparent ===
The current heir apparent Alexander James Profumo, Noble of the Barons of Profumo (Nobile dei Baroni di Profumo) (born 1983), the eldest son of the incumbent Baron, David Profumo.

== Coat of arms ==
The Profumo coat of arms is a gules with a silver band charged on the head with a crown (wreath) of laurel (Di rosso alla fascia d'argento caricato in capo da una corona (ghirlanda) di alloro).

== See also ==
- Nobility of Italy
- Italian honorifics
