= Bolte =

Bolte is an American surname. Notable people with the surname include:

- Audrey Bolte (born 1989), American beauty pageant
- August Bolte (1854–1920), American politician
- Brent Bolte (born 1977), American college football coach
- Charles L. Bolte (1895–1989), U.S. Army general and World War I and World War II veteran
- Edith Bolte MacCracken (1869–1946), American club woman and civic leader
- Henry Bolte GCMG (1908–1990), Australian politician, Premier of Victoria
- Henry Bolte (baseball) (born 2003), American professional baseball outfielder
- Jill Bolte Taylor (born 1959), American neuroanatomist specializing in postmortem investigation of the human brain
- Johannes Bolte (1858–1937), German folklorist and prolific writer
- Michael Bolte, professor

== See also ==
- Bolte Bridge, a large twin Cantilever bridge in Melbourne, Victoria, Australia
