= Michael Dine =

American theoretical physicist

- Born: 12 August 1953 (age 73); Cincinnati, Ohio
- Education: Johns Hopkins University; Yale University
- Known for: Sakurai Prize (2018)
- Scientific career
- Workplaces: Santa Cruz Institute for Particle Physics
- Thesis: Interactions of Heavy Quarks in Quantum Chromodynamics (1978)
- Doctoral advisor: Thomas Appelquist

Michael Dine (born 12 August 1953) is an American theoretical physicist, specializing in elementary particle physics, supersymmetry, string theory, and physics beyond the Standard Model.

== Education and career ==
Dine received in 1974 a bachelor's degree from Johns Hopkins University and in 1978 a Ph.D. under Thomas Appelquist from Yale University with thesis Interactions of Heavy Quarks in Quantum Chromodynamics. He did research at SLAC and was for a number of years at the Institute for Advanced Study and the Henry Semat Professor at City College of New York. He is currently a professor at Santa Cruz Institute for Particle Physics (SCIPP) of the University of California, Santa Cruz.

Dine was a Guggenheim Fellow for the academic year 2006–2007 and Sloan Fellow in 1986. He is a fellow of American Physical Society and in 2010 he was elected a fellow of the American Academy of Arts and Sciences. He is a recipient of the 2018 Sakurai Prize. He was elected a member of the National Academy of Sciences in April 2019.

== Research ==
Dine works on the "phenomenology" (i.e. experimentally testable models for low energy) of supersymmetric extensions of the Standard Model and of superstring theory. In particular, he does research on supersymmetry breaking. Dine investigated in the 1980s modifications of quantum chromodynamics with dynamical supersymmetry breaking (DSB), partly with Ian Affleck and Nathan Seiberg. With Willy Fischler and Mark Srednicki, Dine published in 1981 a theory of supersymmetric technicolor, using gauge bosons and their superpartners, that provided a model of gauge-mediated supersymmetry breaking. Dine with Affleck and Seiberg developed a general theory of dynamical supersymmetry breaking in four-dimensional spacetime and with Ann Nelson, Yuri Shirman, and Yosef Nir developed new models of gauge-mediated dynamical supersymmetry breaking.

With Fischler and Srednicki he developed an "Invisible Axion" model known as the DFSZ (Dine–Fischler–Srednicki–Zhitnisky) model. Later Dine with Fischler also elaborated this theory and its cosmological implications (the axion is a candidate for a dark matter particle). To explain the matter/antimatter imbalance in the universe, Dine and Ian Affeck proposed the Affleck–Dine mechanism. The Affleck–Dine mechanism might provide a candidate for a dark matter particle, namely a particular type of Q-ball.

Dine investigated with Ryan Rohm, Nathan Seiberg and Edward Witten gluino condensation in string theory, with Witten and Seiberg the implications of Fayet–Iliopoulos D-terms for vacuum destabilization, and with X. G. Wen, Seiberg and Witten the non-perturbative effects (instantons) on the worldsheet of strings.

He has done extensive research on applications of superstring theory to cosmology.

== Selected publications ==
as author:

- Supersymmetry and string theory: beyond the standard model. Cambridge, UK: Cambridge University Press. 2007. ISBN 978-1-139-46244-0. Dine, Michael (2015). 2nd edition. Cambridge University Press. ISBN 978-1-107-04838-6.

as editor:

- String theory in four dimensions. Amsterdam: North Holland. 1988.
- with Thomas Banks & Subir Sachdev: String theory and its applications: TASI 2010, from meV to the Planck scale: Proceedings of the 2010 Theoretical Advanced Study Institute in Elementary Particle Physics (Boulder, Colorado). Singapore: World Scientific. 2011.
