= Santa Cruz Institute for Particle Physics =

- Established: 1981
- Research type: Astrophysics; Particle physics
- Field of research: Physics
- Director: Steven Ritz
- Faculty: Anthony Aguirre; Tom Banks; George R. Blumenthal; Michael Dine; Howard E. Haber; Piero Madau; Joel Primack; Constance Rockosi
- Location: Santa Cruz, California, United States
- Affiliations: UC Santa Cruz

The Santa Cruz Institute for Particle Physics (SCIPP) is an organized research unit within the University of California system focused on theoretical and experimental high-energy physics and astrophysics.

== Research ==
SCIPP's scientific and technical staff are and have been involved in several cutting edge research projects for more than 45 years, in both theory and experiment. The primary focus is particle physics and particle astrophysics, including the development of technologies needed to advance that research. SCIPP is also pursuing the application of those technologies to other scientific fields such as neuroscience and biomedicine. The Institute is recognized as a leader in the development of custom readout electronics and silicon micro-strip sensors for state-of-the-art particle detection systems. This department has several faculty associated with the Stanford Linear Accelerator Center (SLAC) or the ATLAS project at CERN.

There are many experiments being performed at any time within SCIPP but many center on Silicone Strip Particle Detectors and their properties before and after radioactive exposure. Also many of the faculty work on monte carlo simulations and tracking particles within particle colliders. Their most prominent project in recent history has been the development of the Gamma-ray Large Area Space Telescope (GLAST) which searches the sky for Gamma Ray Bursts.

== Members ==
Notable faculty include:

- Anthony Aguirre, theoretical cosmologist
- Tom Banks, c-discoverer of M(atrix) theory in string theory
- George R. Blumenthal, astronomer, chancellor of UCSC
- Michael Dine, high-energy theorist, recipient of Sakurai prize, physics department chair
- Howard Haber, theoretical particle physicist, recipient of Sakurai prize
- Piero Madau, recipient of Dannie Heineman Prize for Astrophysics
- Joel Primack, quantum field theorist and cosmologist, director of AstroComputing Center
- Stefano Profumo, theoretical particle physicist and cosmologist, Deputy Director for Theory
- Constance Rockosi, chair of astronomy department
- Terry Schalk
