= David Profumo =

English novelist

Baron David Profumo FRSL 6th Baron Profumo of the Kingdom of Sardinia
- Born: David John Profumo; October 20, 1955 (age 70); Marylebone, London, UK
- Education: Magdalen College, Oxford
- Occupations: Novelist, lecturer, journalist
- Title: Baron
- Spouse: Helen Fraser
- Children: 3
- Parents: John Profumo (father); Valerie Hobson (mother)
- Relatives: Antonio Profumo
- Family: Profumo

Don David John Profumo, 6th Baron Profumo of the Kingdom of Sardinia, FRSL (born 20 October 1955), is an English novelist and son of former British government minister and key subject of the Profumo affair, John Profumo.

== Early life and education ==
Profumo was born in Marylebone, London, the only child to former British government minister John Profumo, and actress Valerie Hobson.

From 1968 to 1973, Profumo undertook his secondary education at Eton College, before attending Magdalen College at the University of Oxford, where he graduated with a Bachelor of Arts and a Master of Arts in English, with honours, in 1977.

== Career ==
Following the completion of his studies, Profumo turned to teaching, and between 1978 and 1979, he worked as the Assistant Master of English at his former secondary school, Eton and Assistant Master of English and drama at Shrewsbury School. In 1981, Profumo became a part-time Lecturer of English at King's College London, a role he remained in until 1983.

From 1982 to 1984, Profumo was Deputy Editor of The Fiction Magazine, before undertaking a number of freelance writing and columnist roles, including for The Daily Telegraph from 1987 to 1995.

In 1988, Profumo published his first book, the non-fiction title The Magic Wheel: an anthology of fishing in literature. His first non-fiction novel, Sea Music was published in 1989.

In 1989, Profumo was appointed a judge for the Booker Prize competition. Profumo was also elected a Fellow of the Royal Society of Literature in 1995, an honour awarded to authors who have published at least two works of literary merit.

In addition to his regular written works, in 2006 Profumo published a family memoir, Bringing the House Down, which covered the scandal brought about by his father's affair with Christine Keeler.

== Personal life ==
Profumo married BBC Television producer, Helen Fraser, daughter of Alasdair Fraser, former Consultant Gynaecologist at St Mary's Hospital, on 22 March 1979 at St Marylebone Parish Church, Marylebone, London. They have three children.

== Bibliography ==
Profumo has written a number of fiction and non-fiction texts over his career, including:

=== Books ===
==== Novels ====
- "Sea Music", London, Secker and Warburg, 1988.
- "A River Runs through it and other stories", Pan Books, London, 1993.
- "The Weather in Iceland", Picador, London, 1993.

==== Non-fiction ====
- "In Praise of Trout", London, Viking, 1989.
- "The Magic Wheel: An Anthology of Fishing Literature", London, Picador, 1985.
- "Bringing the House Down: A Family Memoir", Isis, Oxford 2006.
- "The Lightning Thread: Fishological Moments and The Pursuit of Paradise", Simon & Schuster, London, 2021.

=== Short fiction ===
- Profumo, David (1985). "The blind man eats many flies". In Julian Evans (ed.). Foreign exchange, Sphere, London.

=== Essays and reporting ===
- Profumo, David (10 September 2014). "The little drummer bird". Country Life. 208 (37): 126–127..
- Various Country Life articles.
