= Joel Primack =

American physicist (1945–2025)

Joel R. Primack
- Born: Joel Robert Primack; July 14, 1945; Santa Barbara, California, U.S.
- Died: November 13, 2025 (aged 80); Palo Alto, California, U.S.
- Education: Princeton University (BA); Stanford University (PhD)
- Occupation: Physicist
- Spouse: Nancy Ellen Abrams
- Children: 1 daughter
- Awards: Alexander von Humboldt Foundation Senior Award, 1997
- Scientific career
- Fields: Physics
- Workplaces: University of California, Santa Cruz; University of California High-Performance AstroComputing Center
- Website: primack.sites.ucsc.edu

Joel Robert Primack (July 14, 1945 – November 13, 2025) was an American physicist. He was a professor of physics and astrophysics at the University of California, Santa Cruz, and was a member of the Santa Cruz Institute for Particle Physics.

== Life and career ==
Primack received his A.B. from Princeton University in 1966 and his Ph.D. from Stanford University in 1970. His fields of study were relativistic quantum field theory, cosmology, and particle astrophysics. He was also involved in supercomputer simulations of dark matter models. He directed the University of California High-Performance AstroComputing Center (UC-HiPACC). Primack is best known for his co-authorship with George R. Blumenthal, Sandra Moore Faber, and Martin Rees of the theory of cold dark matter (CDM) in 1984. He co-authored two books with Nancy Abrams, The View from the Center of the Universe (2006) and The New Universe and the Human Future (2011). He played main roles in starting the Congressional Science and Technology Fellowship program, the Forum on Physics and Society of the American Physical Society, and the Science and Human Rights program of the American Association for the Advancement of Science in 1970–1973. He was a fellow of the American Physical Society and the American Association for the Advancement of Science.

Joel Primack also wrote a book with his wife Nancy Abrams for the general audience. It is called The View from the Center of the Universe. It attempts to merge the story of the cosmos and spirituality using story and religious symbols from several cultures throughout time. It follows in the footsteps of authors like Brian Swimme who are actively attempting to give people a way to view the universe as sacred, bringing science and spirituality together without diluting the science. This project is called The Great Story and was started by Thomas Berry.

In 2024, Primack was awarded the AAAS Philip Hauge Abelson Prize, for his lifelong work in bringing science and scientists into policy discussions pertaining to societal issues. A news report on this award quoted Primack saying, on receiving the award:

As a young scientist, I was often advised that spending time on social and political issues would be career suicide, and that I should focus solely on research. But I take seriously the social responsibility of scientists, and I deeply appreciate being recognized both for my scientific contributions and for my efforts to broaden the opportunities for scientists and scientific societies to help solve the challenges facing our world.

Primack died in Palo Alto, California, on November 13, 2025, at the age of 80.
