= High Performance Computing Center =

A high performance computing center is the name given to the location of several super computers around the world:

- High-Performance Computing Centre at the University of Calabria
- High Performance Computing Centre at the Swiss Institute of Bioinformatics
- High Performance Computing Center at Michigan State University
- High Performance Computing Center North (HPC2N) at the Umeå Institute of Technology
- High Performance Computing Center in Stuttgart, Germany at
- Massachusetts Green High Performance Computing Center
- Maui High Performance Computing Center (MHPCC)
- National High Performance Computing Center at Istanbul Technical University
- University of California High-Performance AstroComputing Center
