= 1909 High Peak by-election =

UK parliamentary by-election

← 1906	22 July 1909	Jan. 1910 →

Candidate	Partington	Profumo
Party	Liberal	Conservative
Popular vote	5,619	5,272
Percentage	51.5%	48.4%
MP before election
Oswald Partington
Liberal
Subsequent MP
Oswald Partington
Liberal

The 1909 High Peak by-election was a Parliamentary by-election held on 22 July 1909. The constituency returned one Member of Parliament (MP) to the House of Commons of the United Kingdom, elected by the first past the post voting system.

== Vacancy ==
Oswald Partington had been Liberal MP for the seat of High Peak since the 1900 general election. On 5 July 1909, he was appointed as a Junior Lord of the Treasury, which meant, in accordance with the times, that he was required to resign his seat and seek re-election to parliament.

== Electoral history ==
The seat had been Liberal since Partington gained it from the Conservatives in 1900. He easily held the seat at the last election, with an increased majority;

Partington

General election January 1906
Party	Candidate	Votes	%	±%
Liberal	Oswald Partington	5,450	53.9	+3.0
Conservative	Albert Profumo	4,662	46.1	−3.0
Majority		788	7.8	+6.0
Turnout		10,112	90.7	+4.1
Liberal hold		Swing	+3.0	

== Candidates ==
The local Liberal Association re-selected 37-year-old Oswald Partington to defend the seat. The Conservatives retained 30-year-old barrister Albert Profumo as their candidate. He had unsuccessfully tried to re-gain the seat from Partington at the last election.

== Campaign ==
The Manager of the local Kinder Print Works shown with car depicting a Conservative 'Vote Profumo' poster

Polling Day was fixed for 22 July, allowing for a short 17-day campaign.

On 9 July the Liberals retained a by-election in Cleveland, Yorkshire. On 15 July, the Liberals retained a by-election in nearby Mid Derbyshire. On 20 July, the Liberals retained a by-election in Dumfries Burghs.

The major incident of the campaign was Partington's challenge to fight a reporter of the Sheffield Daily Telegraph. The presses of that paper had been used to print the High Peak Elector, a campaign newspaper published by the Conservatives, which Partington claimed had slighted his wife, Clara.

== Result ==
The Liberals held the seat and managed a slightly reduced majority;

High Peak by-election, 1909
Party	Candidate	Votes	%	±%
Liberal	Oswald Partington	5,619	51.6	−2.3
Conservative	Albert Profumo	5,272	48.4	+2.3
Majority		347	3.2	−4.6
Turnout		10,891	91.1	+0.4
Liberal hold		Swing	-2.3	

== Aftermath ==
Partington retained the seat at the following General Election;

General election January 1910: High Peak
Party	Candidate	Votes	%	±%
Liberal	Oswald Partington	5,912	50.5	−1.1
Conservative	Samuel Hill-Wood	5,806	49.5	+1.1
Majority		106	1.0	−2.2
Turnout		11,718	94.4	+3.3
Liberal hold		Swing	-1.1	
