= Constance M. Rockosi =

Astronomer

- Born: 1972 (age 53–54)
- Education: Princeton University (BSE); University of Chicago (PhD)
- Scientific career
- Fields: Astronomy
- Institutions: University of Washington; University of California, Santa Cruz
- Thesis: Detection and analysis of the tidal tails around the globular cluster Palomar 5 in the SDSS commissioning data (2001)
- Doctoral advisor: Donald G. York

Constance "Connie" Mary Rockosi (born c. 1972) is a professor and former department chair in the Astronomy and Astrophysics Department at the University of California, Santa Cruz. She earned her PhD in 2001 and helped design the camera for the telescope that was used as part of the initial Sloan Digital Sky Survey (SDSS). She also was in charge of the SDSS-III domain for the Sloan Extension for Galactic Understanding and Exploration (SEGUE) project and is the primary investigator on SEGUE-2. Her focuses involve the study of the Milky Way galaxy, with a focus on the evolution that it took to reach its current state.

== Early life and education ==
Rockosi completed her undergraduate studies at Princeton University, earning a BSE. in electrical engineering. During her degree, she worked with James Gunn on the camera for SDSS-I/II.

She received a PhD in astronomy and astrophysics at the University of Chicago in 2001. Part of her graduate research work was developing the imaging camera for the SDSS, which she still helps to maintain.

== Career and research ==
After graduating, Rockosi was a Hubble postdoctoral fellow at the University of Washington in Seattle until 2004 when she became an assistant professor at the University of California, Santa Cruz (UCSC).

Rockosi is currently a professor of astronomy and astrophysics at the UCSC and astronomer at University of California Observatories (UCO)/Lick Observatory. She became a full professor in 2012. She is Technical Laboratories associate director at UCSC and has previously been chair of the Astronomy and Astrophysics department. She is commissioning scientist and calibration scientist on the Dark Energy Spectroscopic Instrument (DESI). She served as the interim director of UCO from the retirement of Claire Max in July 2021 until the appointment of Bruce Macintosh in September 2022.

Rockosi was a lead on the SDSS-III area of the Sloan Extension for Galactic Understanding and Exploration (SEGUE) project which used light spectra from over 200,000 stars in the Milky Way to map out the galaxy. She was also a principal investigator on SEGUE-2.

Rockosi is heavily involved in detector design and calibration. She works or has worked on detectors for the SDSS, the Keck Cosmic Reionization Mapper, the Low Resolution Imaging Spectrometer, the DESI and the Keck Planet Finder.

She believes that through the study of our own galaxy, and the way that it formed - sometimes called "galactic archeology", we can understand the formation of other galaxies during the redshift phase of their creation. Her work uses the position, motion, and chemical composition of ancient stars to better inform our understanding of the Milky Way's evolution and properties. Rockosi is interested in furthering understanding of dark energy throughout the universe through her leadership on the DESI project.

Her research has continued to help her and her students understand the reasons why spiral galaxies form and exist as they do today. One focus of her research is to explore the effects of major accretion events in the formation of the Milky Way. In particular, her interests include studying the metal content of stars and the distribution of metal within the galaxy.

In 2010, Rockosi appeared in a documentary film called "The Joy of Stats".
