= Tesla Jeltema =

Tesla Profumo
- Born: March 19, 1977 (age 49)
- Education: PhD, Massachusetts Institute of Technology, 2004 BS, The College of William and Mary, 1999
- Spouse: Stefano Profumo
- Scientific career
- Workplaces: UC Santa Cruz & Vera C. Rubin Observatory Science Collaboration Coordinator

Tesla Jeltema is a full professor in the Physics Department at the University of California, Santa Cruz and the Associate Director of the Santa Cruz Institute of Particle Physics. She is an astrophysicist whose research broadly focuses on observational probes of the nature of dark matter and dark energy. She currently serves as the Science Collaborations Coordinator for the Vera C. Rubin Observatory Legacy Survey of Space and Time (LSST).

Jeltema won the American Physical Society's Meenakshi Narain Mentoring Award in 2020. She is also the Director of the Cal-Bridge Doctoral Program.

== Education ==
She earned her B.S. degree in physics from the College of William and Mary and the winner of the Thomas Jefferson Prize in Natural Philosophy, awarded for excellence in science, for her graduating class. She earned her PhD in physics from the Massachusetts Institute of Technology.

== Swimming ==
Tesla, who races under Tesla Profumo, is an accomplished open water swimmer. She has won long distance national championships in her age group, swum the Strait of Gibraltar, The Au'au channel in Hawaii, and from Anacapa Island to mainland California. She has won the international El Cruce Cancun twice overall for women. In the pool, she was the 2026 National Champion in the long course 1500m in her age group and twice ranked in the world top ten.
