= Affleck–Dine mechanism =

The Affleck–Dine mechanism (AD mechanism) is a postulated mechanism for explaining baryogenesis during the primordial Universe immediately following the Big Bang. Thus, the AD mechanism may explain the asymmetry between matter and antimatter in the current Universe. It was proposed in 1985 by Ian Affleck and Michael Dine of Princeton University.

In the supersymmetry theory of particle physics, ordinary quarks and leptons have scalar partners that carry baryon and lepton numbers. As the latter decay into fermions during the early Universe, the net baryon number that they carry can then form the currently observed excess of ordinary baryons. This occurs due to interactions of the scalars with the inflaton field, resulting in CP violations.

The AD mechanism must have occurred during or after the reheating event that followed cosmic inflation. This may explain why the net mass of normal matter and dark matter are apparently so close to each other, rather than being widely different.

== See also ==
- Physical cosmology
- Q-ball
