= Chamber of Deputies (Kingdom of Sardinia) =

Lower house of the Sardinian parliament

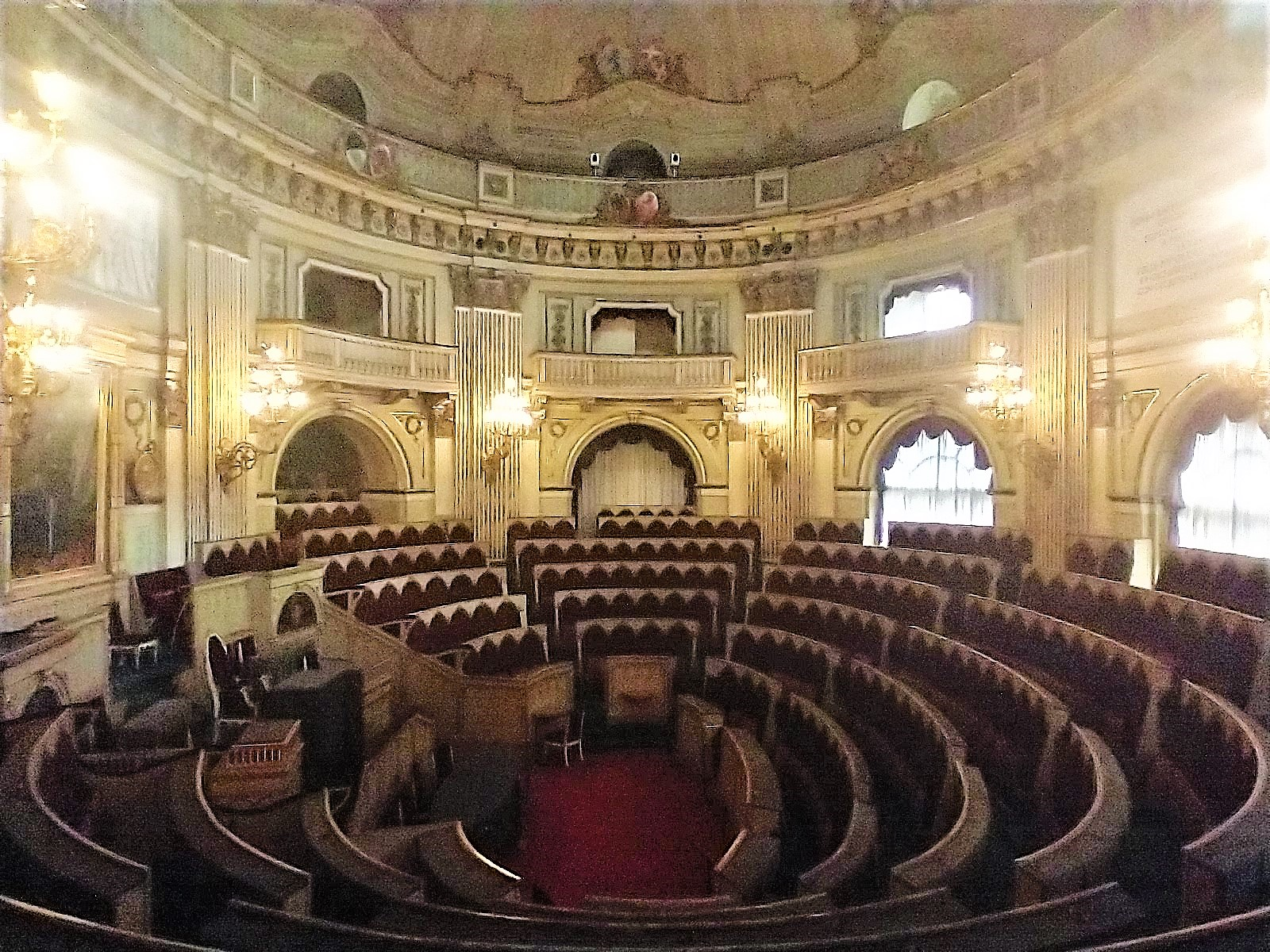
the Chamber of Deputies, at the Palazzo Carignano

The Chamber of Deputies (Italian: Camera dei deputati) was the lower house of the Kingdom of Sardinia and one of the two houses of its bicameral parliament, the other being the Subalpine Senate. It became the Chamber of Deputies of the Kingdom of Italy upon the unification of Italy in 1861.

== Bibliography ==
- (in Italian) Francesco Bartolotta (ed), Parlamenti e governi d'Italia dal 1848 al 1970, Roma, Vito Bianco Ed., 1971.
