= Michael Bolte =

American astronomer

Michael Bolte is a Distinguished Professor of Astronomy and Astrophysics at the University of California Santa Cruz. From 2005 - 2012 he was the Director of the University of California Observatories which operates Lick Observatory near San Jose California, co-manages the W.M. Keck Observatory, and leads the University of California participation in the Thirty-Meter Telescope Project. He was a member of the Board of Directors for the CARA Board that oversees the W.M. Keck Observatory from 2005 - 2013 and has been a Director on the Board of Directors for the Thirty-Meter Telescope International Observatory since 2005.

== Career ==
- PhD, University of Washington Department of Astronomy and Astrophysics (1987)
- Plaskett Postdoctoral Fellow, Herzberg Institute for Astrophysics, Victoria, BC (1988-1990)
- Hubble Postdoctoral Fellow, University of California Santa Cruz (1990-1993)
- Professor of Astronomy and Astrophysics, University of California Santa Cruz (1993–present)
- Director, University of California Observatories (2005 - 2012)

== Research and notable publications ==
General research area is the nature of the oldest stars in the Galaxy and the early chemical evolution of the Universe. He has published more than 100 papers in the referred literature with ~7000 citations at the end of 2018.

With Craig Hogan of the University of Chicago he published in 1995 an early prediction of what became known as "Dark Energy" as a dominant component of the Universe.

With Kathryn Johnston (Columbia) and Lars Hernquist (Harvard) published one of the early papers on identifying "fossil" structures in the Galactic halo left by tidally shredded dwarf galaxies: "Fossil Signatures of Ancient Accretion Events in the Halo"

With Don Vandenberg (University of Victoria) and Peter Stetson (Herzberg Institute for Astrophysics) he published a new technique for measuring age differences between globular clusters that was insensitive to the cluster distances, reddening and overall metallicity. This has been the standard method since the paper was published in 1990.

With David Lai (UC San Diego), Jennifer Johnson (Ohio State University), Sara Lucatello (Osservatorio Astronomico di Padova), Alex Hager (U Minnesota) and Sten Woosley (UC Santa Cruz) published a study of the detailed abundances of extremely metal-poor stars using the results along with theoretical yields from zero-metallicity stars to constrain models for Pop III objects.
