= Parliament of the Kingdom of Sardinia =

Parliament of the Kingdom of Sardinia Parlamento del Regno di Sardegna Parlamento Subalpino
- Kingdom of Sardinia
- Coat of arms of the Kingdom of Sardinia

Type
- Type: Bicameral
- Houses: Subalpine Senate; Chamber of Deputies

History
- Founded: 4 March 1848
- Disbanded: 17 March 1861
- Succeeded by: Parliament of the Kingdom of Italy

Elections
- Voting system: Royal appointment by the King of Sardinia
- Voting system: First past the post

Meeting place
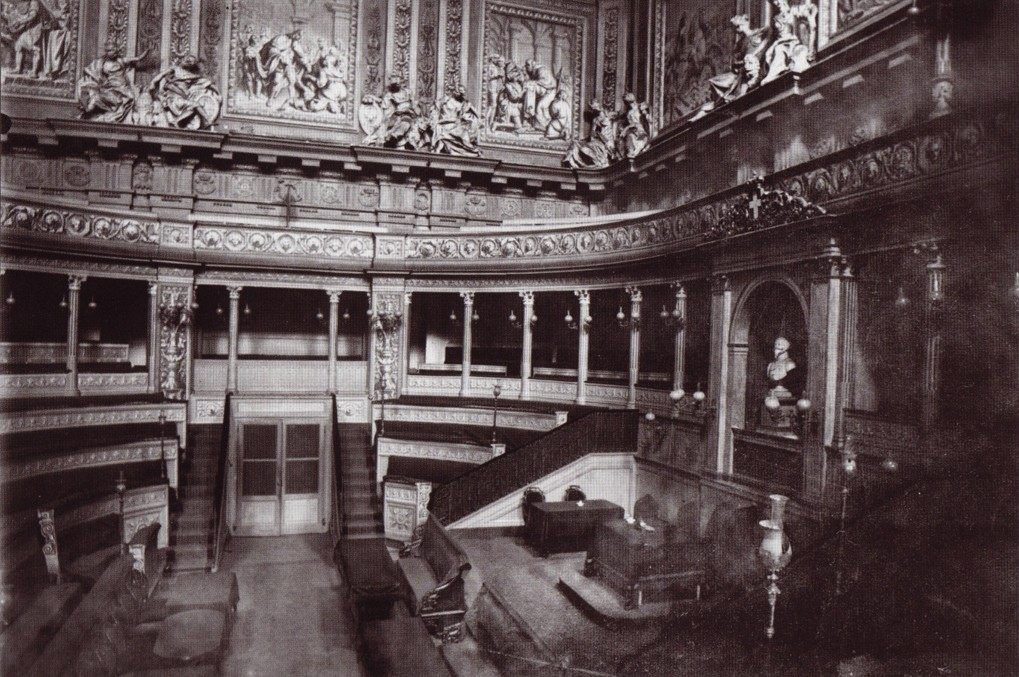
- Senate: Palazzo Madama, Turin
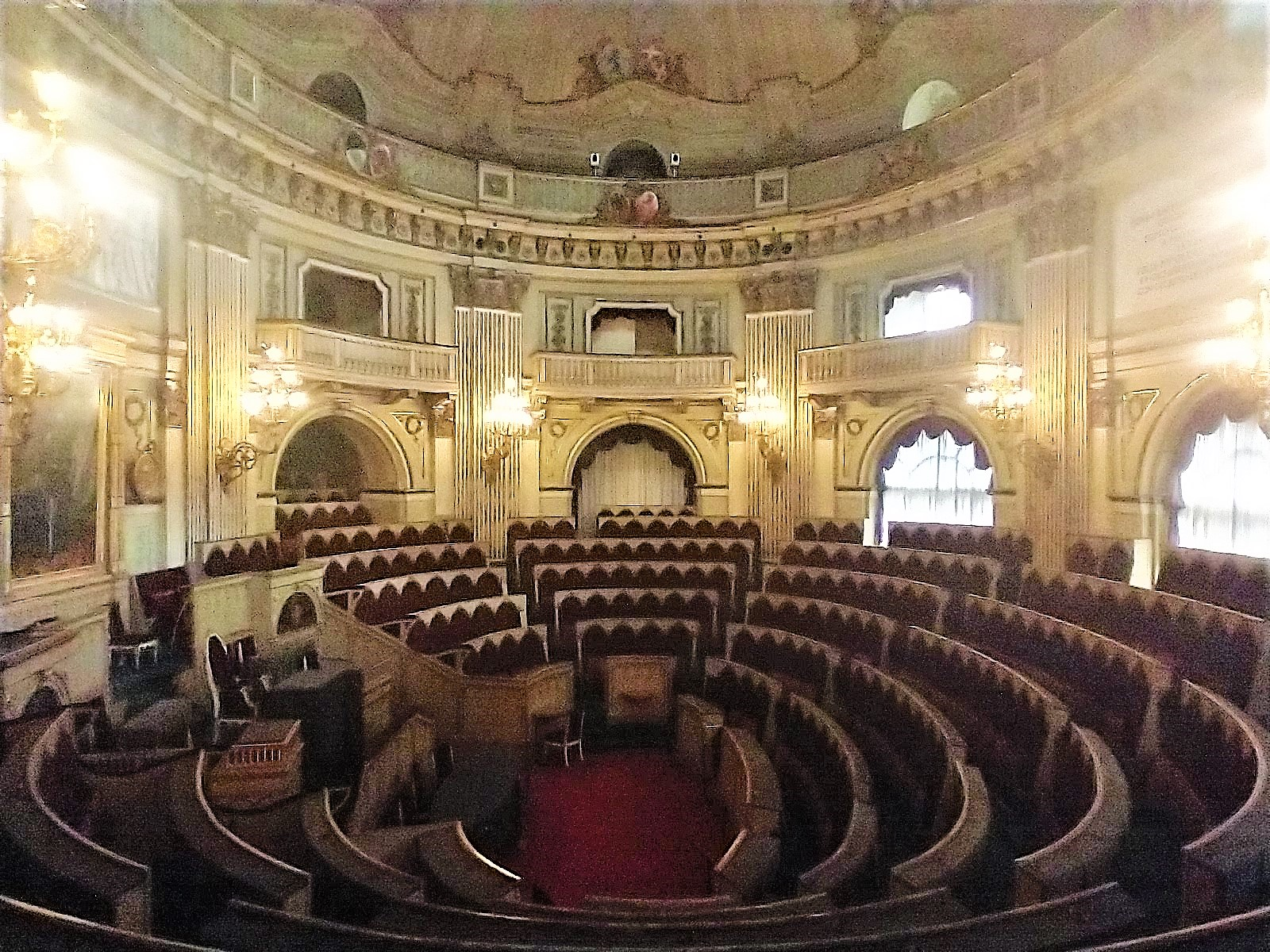
- Chamber of Deputies: Palazzo Carignano, Turin

Constitution
- Statuto Albertino

The Parliament of the Kingdom of Sardinia (Italian: Parlamento del Regno di Sardegna), also called Subalpine Parliament (Italian: Parlamento Subalpino), was the bicameral parliament of the Kingdom of Sardinia.

== History ==
It was established in 1848 by the Albertine Statute and became the Parliament of the Kingdom of Italy upon the unification of Italy in 1861. It is thus the ultimate ancestor of the modern Parliament of Italy.

There were two chambers:

- The Subalpine Senate, whose members were appointed for life by the King of Sardinia, which could not be dissolved, and was based at the Palazzo Madama;
- The Chamber of Deputies, whose members were elected by men who met a property qualification, through a first past the post system, with staggered terms. It was based at the Palazzo Carignano.

Joint sessions of the Parliament, for solemn occasions like the "speech from the crown" (discorso della corona), were held at the Palazzo Carignano, for space reasons.

The two chambers were theoretically equal in power (the so-called "Perfect bicameralism"), like the modern Italian Parliament. In practice, however, it came to be "lop-sided" (zoppa), with the Chamber of Deputies dominating the Senate. Laws could be proposed to the Parliament by parliamentarians, ministers, the executive, and the King. For a bill to become law, the same text had to be approved by both chambers, in any order (except for matters of taxation and expenditure which had to pass through the Chamber of Deputies first), and receive royal sanction. Thus, the Albertine Statute defined the two chambers of Parliament and the King as the "three legislative powers": if any one of these opposed a bill it would not become law and it could not be proposed again in that parliamentary session.

Article 9 of the Albertine Statute gave the King the power of "prorogal of the sessions" (proroga delle sessioni). This enabled the King to block all legislative activity in Parliament, without dissolving the Chamber of Deputies, which remained in a state of "suspension" until he recalled it. The King was also empowered to dissolve the Chamber of Deputies, but in that case, elections had to be held within four months.

== See also ==
- List of Deputies of Savoy in the Sardinian Parliament

== Bibliography ==
- (in Italian) Francesco Bartolotta (ed), Parlamenti e governi d'Italia dal 1848 al 1970, Roma, Vito Bianco Ed., 1971.
