= University of California High-Performance AstroComputing Center =

The University of California High-Performance AstroComputing Center (UC-HiPACC) based at the University of California, Santa Cruz (UCSC) is a consortium of nine University of California campuses and three Department of Energy laboratories (Lawrence Berkeley National Laboratory, Lawrence Livermore Laboratory and Los Alamos National Laboratory). The consortium's goal is to support and facilitate original research and education in computational astrophysics and to engage in public outreach and education.

== Staff and organization ==
Joel R. Primack, distinguished Professor of Physics at UCSC, has directed the UC-HiPACC consortium since its inception. Peter Nugent from the Lawrence Berkeley National Laboratory serves as the coordinator from northern California and Michael Norman from the University of California, San Diego (UCSD) serves as the coordinator from southern California. The consortium is organized at UCSC under the aegis of the Santa Cruz Institute for Particle Physics (SCIPP).

== Principal activities ==
The UC-HiPACC consortium, which began operating in January 2010, supports activities that facilitate and encourage excellence, collaboration, and education in astronomy across the University of California system and affiliated DOE National Laboratories. It does not directly fund research or major hardware. Instead, UC-HiPACC sponsors working groups of UC scientists from multiple campuses and labs who pursue joint projects in computational astrophysics; workshops and conferences on topics in computational astrophysics; and an annual advanced summer school on a topic in computational astrophysics.

=== UC-HiPACC Meetings and Summer Schools 2010–2013 ===
Fourteen multi-day meetings and International Summer Schools on AstroComputing (ISSAC) were held from 2010 to 2013.

Dates	Name of Meeting	Meeting Location/s	Participants	No. of Faculty	No. of Students
2010
June 28–30	Enzo User Workshop	UCSD/SDSC	45		
July 26 – August 13	ISSAC 2010: Galaxy Simulations	UCSC		10	59
August 16–20	Santa Cruz Galaxy Workshop	UCSC	120		
December 16–17	The Future of AstroComputing	UCSD/SDSC	40		
2011
July 18–29	ISSAC 2011: Explosive Astrophysics	UCB/LBNL		14	28
August 8–12	Santa Cruz Galaxy Workshop	UCSC	86		
2012
June 14–16	The Baryon Cycle	UCI	130		
June 23–27	Computational Astronomy Journalism Boot Camp	UCSC/NASA/CAS	20	15	
July 9–20	ISSAC 2012: AstroInformatics	UCSD/SDSC		11	34
August 13–17	Santa Cruz Galaxy Workshop	UCSC	95		
August 18–20	AGORA kickoff workshop	UCSC	52		
2013
July 22 – August 9	ISSAC 2013: Star and Planet Formation	UCSC		16	48
August 12–16	Santa Cruz Galaxy Workshop	UCSC	95		
August 16–23	AGORA workshop	UCSC	37		
2014 (planned)
February 12–14	Near-Field Deep-Field Connection Conference	UCI			
March 21–22	Future of UC-HiPACC Workshop	UCB/LBL			
July 21 – August 1	ISSAC 2014	UCSD/SDSC			
August 11–15	Santa Cruz Galaxy Workshop	UCSC			
August 15–18	AGORA workshop	UCSC			
August 15–18	AGORA workshop	UCSC			
2024
July 29 – August 2	Santa Cruz Galaxy Workshop	UCSC			
2025
August 4–8	Santa Cruz Galaxy Workshop	UCSC			
August 8–9	AGORA workshop	UCSC			

AGORA = Assembling Galaxies of Resolved Anatomy; CAS = California Academy of Sciences; CGE = Center for Galaxy Evolution; ISSAC = International Summer School on AstroComputing; LBNL = Lawrence Berkeley National Laboratory; NASA = NASA Ames Research Center; NSF = National Science Foundation; SDSC = San Diego Supercomputer Center; UCI = UC Irvine; UCSC = UC Santa Cruz. All participants in the journalism boot camp were professional science journalists.

==== Future of AstroComputing Workshop (2010) ====
In December 2010, UC-HiPACC organized a major conference on the Future of AstroComputing at the San Diego Supercomputer Center at the University of California, San Diego (SDSC). UC-HiPACC provided partial support for the Enzo workshop at UCSD in spring 2010.

==== 2012 Science Journalism Boot Camp in Computational Astronomy ====
It organized a journalism "boot camp" on computational astronomy, called "Computational Astronomy: From Planets to Cosmos”.

==== Santa Cruz Galaxy Workshops ====
Five-day workshops for galaxy researchers worldwide co-sponsored by UC-HiPACC were held at UCSC in August 2010, 2011, 2012, and 2013.

=== Cosmological simulations ===
Large cosmological simulations are now the basis for much current research on the structure of the universe and the evolution of galaxies and clusters of galaxies. "Numerical simulations have become one of the most effective tools to study and to solve astrophysical problems."

==== Project AGORA ====
In 2012, the center launched a galaxy supercomputer simulation project called AGORA (Assembling Galaxies of Resolved Anatomy).

==== Bolshoi simulation ====
The Bolshoi cosmological simulation (q.v.) is the most accurate cosmological simulation of the evolution of the large-scale structure of the universe made to date.

=== Education of public and other outreach ===
Planetarium shows for which UC-HiPACC members have contributed astronomical computations and images include "Life: A Cosmic Story” in the 75-foot dome of the Morrison Planetarium in San Francisco, and “Deep Space Adventure" in the 71-foot 8000 pixel-across dome of the Adler Planetarium in Chicago.

A visualization from the Bolshoi cosmological simulation was narrated in the National Geographic TV special Inside the Milky Way. UC-HiPACC provided footage from the Bolshoi simulation to the Icelandic performer Björk for her musical number "Dark Matter" for her Biophilia concert.
