= Terry Schalk =

American physicist

Terry Schalk is an American physicist currently professor emeritus at University of California, Santa Cruz and an Elected Fellow of the American Association for the Advancement of Science.

== Education ==
Schalk earned his PhD at Iowa State University in 1969.

== Research ==
His interests are accelerator physics, high-energy particle physics , dark energy, dark matter and astrophysics. His highest cited paper is "Status of the dark energy survey camera (DECam) project" at 112 times, according to Google Scholar.

== Publications ==
- Aubert, B.; Bona, M.; Boutigny, D.; Karyotakis, Y.; Lees, J. P.; et al. (BABAR) (24 May 2007). "Evidence for $D^{0}-\overline{D}^{0}$ Mixing". Physical Review Letters. 98 (21) 211802. arXiv:hep-ex/0703020. doi:10.1103/physrevlett.98.211802. ISSN 0031-9007. PMID 17677764. S2CID 18584223.
- Abe, K.; Akagi, T.; Allen, N. J.; Ash, W. W.; Aston, D.; et al. (SLD) (26 January 1998). "Measurement of R_{b} Using a Vertex Mass Tag". Physical Review Letters. 80 (4): 660–665. arXiv:hep-ex/9708015. Bibcode:1998PhRvL..80..660A. doi:10.1103/physrevlett.80.660. ISSN 0031-9007. S2CID 17595062.
- Aubert, B.; Barate, R.; Boutigny, D.; Gaillard, J.-M.; Hicheur, A.; et al. (BABAR) (17 June 2003). "Observation of a Narrow Meson State Decaying to $D^{+}_{s} \pi^{0}$ at a Mass of 2.32 GeV/c^{2}". Physical Review Letters. 90 (24) 242001. arXiv:hep-ex/0304021. doi:10.1103/physrevlett.90.242001. ISSN 0031-9007. PMID 12857188. S2CID 3837362.
- Aubert, B.; Boutigny, D.; Gaillard, J.-M.; Hicheur, A.; Karyotakis, Y.; et al. (BABAR) (29 October 2002). "Measurement of the CP Asymmetry Amplitude sin2β with B^{0} Mesons". Physical Review Letters. 89 (20) 201802. arXiv:hep-ex/0207042. Bibcode:2002PhRvL..89t1802A. doi:10.1103/physrevlett.89.201802. ISSN 0031-9007. PMID 12443469.
- Aubert, B.; Boutigny, D.; Gaillard, J.-M.; Hicheur, A.; Karyotakis, Y.; et al. (BABAR) (14 August 2001). "Observation ofCPViolation in the B^{0} Meson System". Physical Review Letters. 87 (9) 091801. arXiv:hep-ex/0107013. Bibcode:2001PhRvL..87i1801A. doi:10.1103/physrevlett.87.091801. ISSN 0031-9007. PMID 11531560. S2CID 5694920.
- Abe, Kenji; Abe, Koya; Abe, T.; Adam, I.; Akagi, T.; et al. (SLD) (6 September 1999). "Direct Measurement of A_{b} in Z^{0} Decays Using Charged Kaon Tagging" (PDF). Physical Review Letters. 83 (10). American Physical Society (APS): 1902–1907. Bibcode:1999PhRvL..83.1902A. doi:10.1103/physrevlett.83.1902. ISSN 0031-9007.
- Abe, Kenji; Abe, Koya; Abe, T.; Adam, I.; Akagi, T.; et al. (SLD) (25 October 1999). "Direct Measurement of A_{b} and A_{c} at the Z^{0} Pole Using a Lepton Tag" (PDF). Physical Review Letters. 83 (17). American Physical Society (APS): 3384–3389. Bibcode:1999PhRvL..83.3384A. doi:10.1103/physrevlett.83.3384. ISSN 0031-9007.
