= Ian Affleck =

Canadian physicist (1952–2024)

Ian Affleck FRS
- Born: July 2, 1952; Vancouver, British Columbia, Canada
- Died: October 4, 2024 (aged 72)
- Education: Trent University; Harvard University
- Known for: Affleck–Dine mechanism Affleck-Kennedy-Lieb-Tasaki model
- Awards: Sloan Foundation Fellow (1983–1987); Canadian Institute for Advanced Research; Fellow (1987–2001) Associate (2001–2008) Fellow (2008–): National Research Council Steacie Prize (1988); Canadian Association of Physicists Herzberg Medal (1990); Royal Society of Canada Rutherford Medal in Physics (1991); Fellow of the Royal Society of Canada/Canadian Academy of Sciences (1991–); UBC Senior Killam Research Prize (1992); UBC Jacob Biely Prize (1992); Canadian Association of Physicists/Centre de Recherche Mathematique Prize for Mathematics/Theoretical Physics (1997); B.C. Science Council New Frontiers in Research Award (1998); Fellow of the American Physical Society (2002); Canadian Association of Physicists Medal for Achievement in Physics (2006); Fellow of the Royal Society (2010); Onsager Prize, American Physical Society (2012)
- Scientific career
- Fields: Condensed matter theory, superconductivity, quantum magnetism, quantum impurities
- Doctoral advisor: Sidney R. Coleman

Ian Keith Affleck (July 2, 1952 – October 4, 2024) was a Canadian physicist specializing in condensed matter physics. He was Killam University Professor, Department of Physics and Astronomy, University of British Columbia.

== Life and career ==
Ian Affleck was born in Vancouver, British Columbia on July 2, 1952. He studied theoretical aspects of condensed matter physics, including high temperature superconductivity, low dimensional magnetism, quantum dots and quantum wires.

Affleck made many important contributions to theoretical and mathematical physics. He began his career in high energy theory (HEP), and has successfully applied many techniques from HEP to condensed matter. In particular, he has applied conformal field theory techniques to low dimensional magnetism, Kondo effects and quantum impurity problems. In doing so, he enjoyed finding "mathematically elegant solutions" to problems. He was also a member of the CIFAR's Superconductivity Program and the Cosmology and Gravity Program.

Affleck held numerous awards including the 2006 CAP Medal for Lifetime Achievement and the 2014 DCMMP Brockhouse Medal. He was elected a Fellow of the American Physical Society in 2002 and a Fellow of the Royal Society in 2010.

Affleck died on October 4, 2024, at the age of 72.
