= University of California Observatories =

The University of California Observatories (UCO) is a multi-campus astronomical research unit of the University of California, with headquarters on the UC Santa Cruz campus. UCO operates the Lick Observatory on Mount Hamilton, and the technical labs at UC Santa Cruz and UCLA. UCO is also a managing partner of the W. M. Keck Observatory in Hawaii, and the center for the UC participation in the Thirty-Meter Telescope (TMT) project.

UCO was founded in 1988 to recognize the expansion of responsibilities of the Lick Observatory Headquarters to include managing the UC share of the W.M. Keck Observatory in Hawaii.

== Leadership ==
The first UCO Director was Dr. Robert Kraft, who transitioned from his position as the Lick Observatory Director at the founding of UCO. Kraft was responsible for guiding the development of the UC role in the W.M. Keck Observatory and the partnership in Keck with Caltech. In 1991, Dr. Joe Miller became the second UCO Director and oversaw the successful completion of the two 10-meter Keck Telescopes and the initial UC Keck instruments. In 2005 Miller stepped down and Dr. Michael Bolte became the UCO interim Director. In 2006 Bolte became the UCO Director and served till 2012. Dr. Sandra Faber was Interim Director for 2013/2014, Dr. Claire Max Interim Director in 2015 and Dr. Claire Max became Director in 2016.

== Instrumentation Program ==
A number of instruments and adaptive optics systems have been built at the UC Observatories labs in UC Santa Cruz and UCLA.
