= Stefano Profumo =

Italian-American Theoretical physicist and professor at UC Santa Cruz

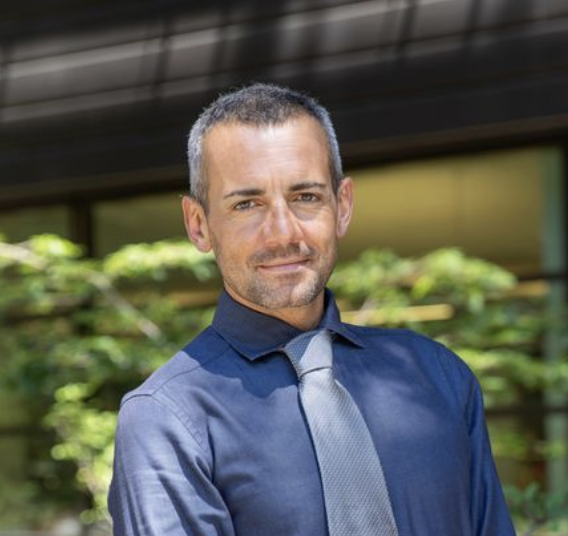
- Born: 25 January 1978 (age 48)
- Education: Scuola Normale Superiore di Pisa; University of Pisa; International School for Advanced Studies
- Spouse: Tesla Profumo
- Scientific career
- Workplaces: University of California, Santa Cruz; California Institute of Technology; Florida State University
- Thesis: Neutralino Dark Matter Searches (2004)
- Website: Stefano Profumo

Stefano Profumo (born 25 January 1978) is an Italian-American theoretical physicist and professor at the University of California, Santa Cruz. He works on particle dark matter, high-energy astrophysics, and black hole physics. He is a Fellow of the American Physical Society. and a recipient of the 2009 Department of Energy's Outstanding Junior Investigator Award.

== Early life and education ==
Profumo studied physics at the University of Pisa (B.Sc., 2001) and theoretical physics at the Scuola Normale Superiore di Pisa (M.Sc., 2001). He earned a Ph.D. in elementary particle theory at the SISSA–ISAS in Trieste, Italy, in 2004. He subsequently held postdoctoral appointments at Florida State University (2004–2005) and the California Institute of Technology (2005–2007).

== Academic career ==
Profumo joined the faculty of the Department of Physics at the University of California, Santa Cruz in 2007 as an assistant professor. He became associate professor with tenure in 2011 and full professor in 2015. Since 2015 he has served as director of graduate studies in the physics department, and in 2024 he was appointed Associate Dean for Graduate Studies and Postdoctoral Affairs in the Physical and Biological Sciences Division. He has also been serving as Deputy Director for Theory at the Santa Cruz Institute for Particle Physics since 2011.

Profumo's research covers particle physics beyond the Standard Model, models of baryogenesis, and astro-particle physics including dark matter searches, high-energy astrophysical phenomena, and black hole physics. His work has been often featured in the popular press.

== Publications ==
Profumo is the co-author of the invited review "Dark Matter" in the Review of Particle Physics (with Laura Baudis, 2020–present). His textbook An Introduction to Particle Dark Matter was published by World Scientific in 2017. He is also the author of Advanced Physics Problems and Solutions, Volume 1: Classical Mechanics and Mathematical Methods, and Advanced Physics Problems and Solutions, Volume 2: Electricity and Magnetism, Quantum Mechanics, and Statistical Mechanics, both published by World Scientific in the Advanced Textbooks in Physics series. As of 2025, his work has been cited more than 42,000 times, with an h-index of 83, according to Google Scholar.

== Selected publications ==
- L. Baudis and S. Profumo, "Dark Matter," Progress of Theoretical and Experimental Physics 2020, 083C01
- D. Hooper and S. Profumo, "Dark matter and collider phenomenology of universal extra dimensions," Physics Reports 453, 29 (2007)
- G. Arcadi, M. Dutra, P. Ghosh, M. Lindner, Y. Mambrini, M. Pierre, S. Profumo and F. S. Queiroz, "The waning of the WIMP? A review of models, searches, and constraints," European Physical Journal C 78 (2018) 203
- S. Profumo, "Dark baryon black holes", Phys.Rev.D 111 (2025) 9, 095010
- S. Profumo, "Dark matter from quasi–de Sitter horizons", Phys.Rev.D 112 (2025) 2, 023511

== Awards and honors ==
- Fellow of the American Physical Society (2020)
- DOE Outstanding Junior Investigator Award (2009)
- University of California, Santa Cruz Excellence in Teaching Award (2010)
- University of California, Santa Cruz Undergraduate Mentoring Award (2023)

== Professional service ==
He was a founding editor and is the Editor-in-Chief of Physics of the Dark Universe, he is Editor-in-Chief of Astrophysical Frontiers, he is on the editorial board of Asymmetry and of Particles in the Phenomenology and Physics Beyond the Standard Model section, he is a section board member in the Particles journal (Astroparticle Physics & Cosmology section); He also serves on the editorial board of Physical Review Letters.
