= John Profumo =

British politician (1915–2006)

John Profumo CBE
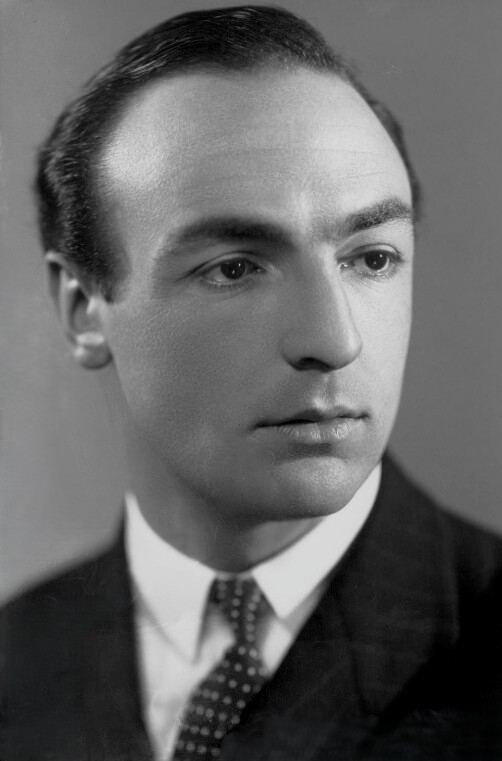
- Profumo in 1938

Secretary of State for War
- In office 27 July 1960 – 5 June 1963
- Prime Minister: Harold Macmillan
- Preceded by: Christopher Soames
- Succeeded by: Joseph Godber

Minister of State for Foreign Affairs
- In office 16 January 1959 – 27 July 1960
- Prime Minister: Harold Macmillan
- Preceded by: Allan Noble
- Succeeded by: David Ormsby-Gore

Parliamentary Under-Secretary of State
- 1958–1959: Foreign Affairs
- 1957–1958: Colonies
- 1952–1957: Ministry of Transport

Member of Parliament for Stratford-on-Avon
- In office 23 February 1950 – 6 June 1963
- Preceded by: Constituency established
- Succeeded by: Angus Maude

Member of Parliament for Kettering
- In office 6 March 1940 – 15 June 1945
- Preceded by: John Eastwood
- Succeeded by: Dick Mitchison

Personal details
- Born: 30 January 1915 London, England
- Died: 9 March 2006 (aged 91) London, England
- Party: Conservative
- Spouse: Valerie Hobson (m. 1954; died 1998)
- Children: David Profumo
- Parents: Albert Profumo (father); Martha Thom Walker (mother)
- Education: Brasenose College, Oxford

Military service
- Allegiance: United Kingdom
- Branch/service: British Army
- Years of service: 1939–1950
- Rank: Brigadier
- Battles/wars: Second World War

John Dennis Profumo (/prəˈfjuːmoʊ/ prə-FEW-moh; 30 January 1915 – 9 March 2006) was a British politician whose career ended in 1963 after a sexual relationship with the 19-year-old model Christine Keeler in 1961. The scandal, which became known as the Profumo affair, led to his resignation from the Conservative government of Harold Macmillan.

After his resignation Profumo worked as a volunteer at Toynbee Hall, a charity in East London, and became its chief fundraiser. These charitable activities helped to restore his reputation and he was appointed a Commander of the Order of the British Empire (CBE) in 1975.

== Early life and career ==
Profumo was born in Kensington, London, the son of Albert Profumo, a diplomat and barrister of Italian ancestry, who died in 1940. He attended Harrow School and Brasenose College, Oxford. Whilst at Oxford Profumo was a member of the Bullingdon Club. In 1933, "Jack" Profumo began a long-term relationship with a German student, Gisela Klein, who later became a model and subsequently worked for German intelligence in Paris, and eventually married an American called Edward Winegard. Secret Service papers state Profumo also wrote to Gisela while he was an MP.

On 1 July 1939, Profumo was commissioned into the Royal Armoured Corps as a second lieutenant. He had previously been a member of the Officer Training Corps and a Cadet Sergeant while at Harrow. He served in North Africa with the Northamptonshire Yeomanry as a captain (acting major), where he was mentioned in dispatches. He landed in Normandy on D-Day and was engaged in the subsequent fierce fighting to secure that region of France. His final rank in the British Army was brigadier.

In 1940, upon the death of his father Albert Profumo, he inherited the family's Italian Barony and was styled John Profumo, 5th Baron Profumo of the Kingdom of Sardinia, however, the Speaker of the House of Commons and then the Foreign Office refused to allow Profumo to use the title.

On 21 December 1944, Major (temporary Lieutenant Colonel) Profumo was appointed an Officer of the Order of the British Empire (OBE, Military Division) "in recognition of gallant and distinguished service in Italy", specifically, for his service on Field Marshal Sir Harold Alexander's staff commanding the 15th Army Group. In November 1947, Acting Colonel Profumo was awarded the Bronze Star Medal by the United States "in recognition of distinguished services in the cause of the Allies".

== Political career ==
In 1940, while still serving in the Army, Profumo was elected to the House of Commons as a Conservative Member of Parliament (MP) for Kettering in Northamptonshire at a by-election on 3 March.

Shortly afterwards he voted against the Chamberlain government in the debate following the British defeat at Narvik in Norway. This defiance on Profumo's part enraged the Chief Whip, David Margesson, who said to him "I can tell you this, you utterly contemptible little shit. On every morning that you wake up for the rest of your life you will be ashamed of what you did last night." Profumo later remarked that Margesson "couldn't have been more wrong".

Profumo was then the youngest MP and, by the time of his death, he had become the last surviving former member of the 1940 House of Commons. At the 1945 election, Profumo was defeated at Kettering by the Labour candidate, Dick Mitchison. Later in 1945, he was chief of staff to the British Mission to Japan. In 1950, he left the Army and, at the general election in February 1950, he was elected for Stratford-on-Avon in Warwickshire, a safe Conservative seat.

Profumo was a well-connected politician with a good war record and, despite Margesson's aforementioned outburst, was highly regarded in the Conservative Party. Those qualities helped him to rise steadily through the ranks of the Conservative government elected in 1951. He was appointed Parliamentary Secretary to the Ministry of Civil Aviation in November 1952, Joint Parliamentary Secretary to the Ministry of Transport and Civil Aviation in November 1953, Parliamentary Under-Secretary of State for the Colonies in January 1957, Parliamentary Under-Secretary of State at the Foreign Office in November 1958, and Minister of State for Foreign Affairs in January 1959. In July 1960, he was appointed Secretary of State for War (outside of the Cabinet) and was sworn of the Privy Council. In 1954, he married the actress Valerie Hobson.

== The Profumo affair ==
In July 1961, at a party at Cliveden, home of Viscount Astor, John Profumo met Christine Keeler, a 19-year-old model with whom he began a sexual relationship. The exact length of the affair between Profumo and Keeler is disputed, ending either in August 1961 after Profumo was warned by the security services of the possible dangers of mixing with the Ward circle, or continuing with decreasing fervour until December 1961. Since Keeler had also had sexual relations with Yevgeny Ivanov, the senior naval attaché at the Soviet Embassy, the matter took on a national-security dimension.

In December 1962, a shooting incident in London involving two other men who were involved with Keeler led the press to investigate her, and reporters soon learned of her affairs with Profumo and Ivanov. But the British tradition of respecting the private lives of British politicians, for fear of libel actions, was maintained until March 1963, when the Labour MP George Wigg, claiming to be motivated by the national-security aspects of the case, and taking advantage of Parliamentary privilege, which gave him immunity from any possible legal action, referred in the House of Commons to the rumours linking Profumo with Keeler. Profumo then made a personal statement in which he admitted he knew Keeler but denied there was any "impropriety" in their relationship and threatened to sue if newspapers asserted otherwise.

Profumo's statement did not prevent newspapers publishing stories about Keeler, and it soon became apparent to Macmillan that Profumo's position was untenable. On 5 June 1963, Profumo was forced to admit that he had lied to the House in March when he denied an affair with Keeler, which at that time was an unforgivable offence in British politics. Profumo resigned from office and from the Privy Council, and applied for and was appointed to the role of steward of the Chiltern Hundreds to give up his Commons seat. Before making his public confession, Profumo confessed the affair to his wife, who stood by him. It was never shown that his relationship with Keeler had led to any breach of national security. The scandal rocked the Conservative government, and was generally held to have been among the causes of its defeat by Labour at the 1964 election. Macmillan had already gone by then, having resigned in October 1963 on health grounds to be succeeded by Alec Douglas-Home.

Profumo maintained complete public silence about the matter for the rest of his life, even when the 1989 film Scandal—in which he was played by Ian McKellen—and the publication of Keeler's memoirs revived public interest in the affair.

Profumo was portrayed by Daniel Flynn in Andrew Lloyd Webber's stage musical Stephen Ward, which opened at the Aldwych Theatre on 19 December 2013.

He was portrayed by Ben Miles in the 2019/2020 BBC drama The Trial of Christine Keeler and by Tim Steed in the Netflix series The Crown, where the Profumo Affair is part of the plot for season 2, episode 10 – "Mystery Man".

The Profumo affair is referenced in Billy Joel's song "We Didn't Start the Fire," released in 1989.

== Later life ==
Shortly after his resignation, Profumo was invited to work at Toynbee Hall as a volunteer by Walter Birmingham, who was a warden there. Toynbee Hall is a charity based in the East End of London, and Profumo continued to work there for the rest of his life, becoming Toynbee Hall's chief fundraiser, and using his political skills and contacts to raise large sums of money. All this work was done as a volunteer, since Profumo was able to live on his inherited wealth.

His wife, the actress Valerie Hobson, also devoted herself to charity until her death in 1998. Profumo's charity work redeemed his reputation. His friend, social reform campaigner Lord Longford, said he "felt more admiration [for Profumo] than [for] all the men I've known in my lifetime".

Profumo was appointed a Commander of the Order of the British Empire (CBE, Civil Division) in the 1975 Birthday Honours, and received the honour at a Buckingham Palace ceremony from Queen Elizabeth II, signalling his return to respectability. In 1995, former Conservative Prime Minister Margaret Thatcher invited him to her 70th birthday dinner, where he sat next to the Queen. He appeared only occasionally in public, particularly in his last years when he used a wheelchair. His last appearance was at the memorial service for Sir Edward Heath on 8 November 2005.

== Death and tributes ==
On 7 March 2006, Profumo suffered a stroke and was admitted to London's Chelsea and Westminster Hospital. He died two days later surrounded by his family, at the age of 91. After his death, many commentators said that he should be remembered as much for his contribution to society after his fall from political grace as for the scandal of 1963 which caused that fall. He was cremated at Mortlake Crematorium; his ashes were buried next to those of his wife at the family vault in front of St Peter's Church in Hersham.

Parliament of the United Kingdom
Preceded by John Eastwood	Member of Parliament for Kettering; 1940–1945	Succeeded by Dick Mitchison
New constituency	Member of Parliament for Stratford-on-Avon; 1950–1963	Succeeded by Angus Maude
Preceded by Malcolm Macmillan	Baby of the House; 1940–1941	Succeeded by George Charles Grey
Preceded by George Charles Grey	Baby of the House; 1944–1945	Succeeded by Ernest Millington
Political offices
Preceded by Joseph Gurney Braithwaite; Reginald Maudling	Parliamentary Secretary to the Minister of Transport; 1952–1957; With: Gurney Braithwaite 1952–1953; Hugh Molson 1953–1957	Succeeded by Richard Nugent; Airey Neave
Preceded by The Lord Lloyd	Under-Secretary of State for the Colonies; 1957–1958	Succeeded by Julian Amery
Preceded by Ian Harvey; The Marquess of Lansdowne	Parliamentary Under-Secretary of State for Foreign Affairs; 1958–1959; With: The Marquess of Lansdowne	Succeeded by The Marquess of Lansdowne; Robert Allan
Preceded by Allan Noble; Hon. David Ormsby-Gore	Minister of State for Foreign Affairs; 1959–1960; With: Hon. David Ormsby-Gore	Succeeded by Hon. David Ormsby-Gore
Preceded by Christopher Soames	Secretary of State for War; 1960–1963	Succeeded by Joseph Godber
