= Subalpine Senate =

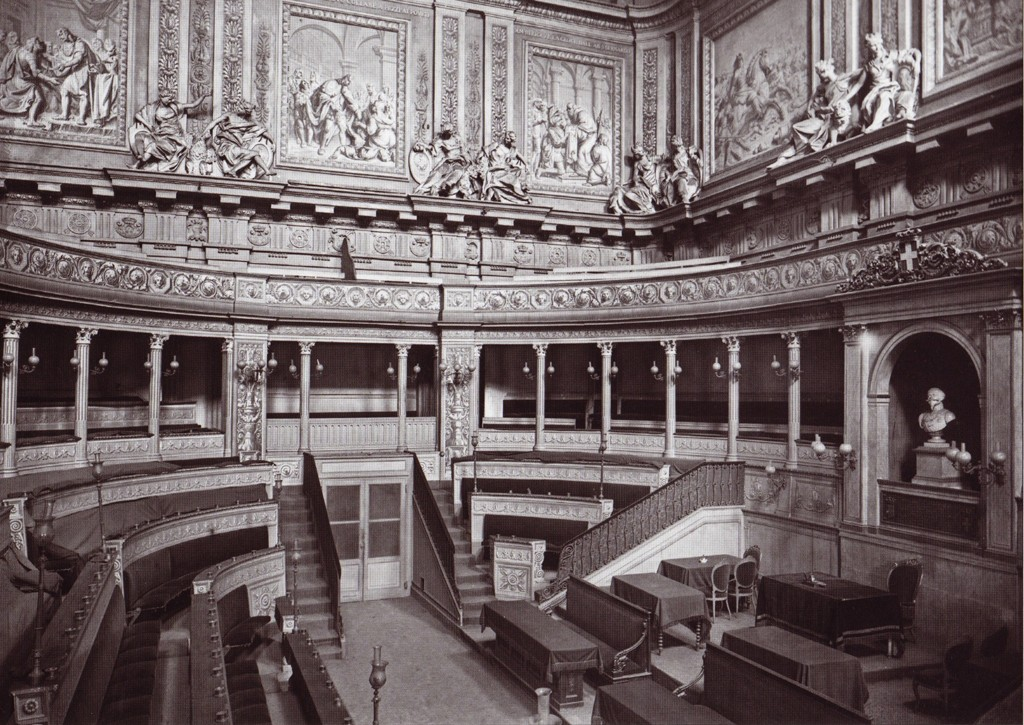
Subalpine Senate

The Subalpine Senate (Italian: Senato Subalpino) was the upper house of the Kingdom of Sardinia and one of the two houses of its bicameral parliament, the other being the Chamber of Deputies. It was set up in 1848 following the fusion of the Savoyard states. It became the Senate of the Kingdom of Italy upon the unification of Italy in 1861. It is the direct ancestor of the present Italian Senate. Its name was a reference to the Napoleonic Subalpine Republic.

== See also ==
- Subalpine Parliament

== Bibliography ==
- (in Italian) Francesco Bartolotta (ed), Parlamenti e governi d'Italia dal 1848 al 1970, Roma, Vito Bianco Ed., 1971.
