= Italian honorifics =

Terms of honor in the Italian language

These are some of the honorifics used in Italy.

== Nobility ==
As part of the republican constitution that became effective in Italy on 1 January 1948, titles of nobility ceased to be recognized in law (although they were not, strictly, abolished or banned), and the organ of state which had regulated them, the Consulta Araldica, was abolished. However the so-called predicati — territorial or manorial designations that were often connected to a noble title by use of a nobiliary particle such as di, da, della, dei, could be resumed as part of the legal surname upon judicial approval for persons who possessed it prior to 28 October 1922 (date of Italian fascism's accession to power). In practice, this meant that, e.g., "John Doe, Duke of Somewhere" or "Princess Jane of Kingdom" might become "John Doe di Somewhere" or "Jane della Kingdom", respectively. Nonetheless, titles are often still used unofficially in villages, private clubs and some social sets. Signore and Signora (formerly signifying landed nobility) are translations of "Lord" and "Lady", used also in the military hierarchy and for persons in official positions or for members of a society's elite. A few titles are also common in diminutive form as terms of affection for young people (e.g. Principino for "Princeling" or Contessina for "the Little Countess").

- Imperatore (Emperor) / Imperatrice (Empress)
- Re (King) / Regina (Queen)
- Principe (Prince) / Principessa (Princess)
- Duca (Duke) / Duchessa (Duchess)
- Marchese (Marquis) / Marchesa (Marchioness)
- Conte (Count or Earl) / Contessa (Countess)
- Visconte (Viscount) / Viscontessa (Viscountess)
- Barone (Baron) / Baronessa (Baroness)
- Patrizio (Patrician) / Patrizia
- Nobiluomo – n.h./n.u. (Nobleman) / Nobildonna – n.d. (Noblewoman)
- Cavaliere Ereditario (Baronet) / no female equivalent

Use of the prefix "Don" as a style for certain persons of distinction spread to the Kingdom of Naples and Sicily during the Spanish domination of southern Italy in the 16th century. Officially, it was the style to address a noble (as distinct from a reigning) prince (principe) or duke (duca), and their children and agnatic descendants. Any Italian monarch (as in Spain) might informally be addressed or referred to with this prefix, for example King Carlos III of Spain was widely known in his Neapolitan realm as "Don Carlo". Genealogical databases and dynastic works still reserve the title for this class of noble by tradition, although it is no longer a right under Italian law. In practice, especially in the countryside, Don was also used as an honorific title for untitled noblemen, such as knights. The feminine is Donna.

== State honours ==
The President of the Republic can award "honours of the Republic". These are:

- Medals (Gold, Silver, Bronze) to persons or entity for merit or valor
- Knighthood (Cavaliere di Gran Croce, Grande Ufficiale, Commendatore – comm., Cavaliere Ufficiale – cav. uff., Cavaliere – cav.) of five Orders (Ordine al Merito della Repubblica Italiana, Ordine Militare d'Italia, Ordine al Merito del Lavoro, Ordine della Stella d'Italia, Ordine di Vittorio Veneto)
  - Ordine al Merito della Repubblica Italiana (Order of Merit of the Italian Republic) is for outstanding merit in regard to the nation
  - Ordine Militare d'Italia (Military Order of Italy) rewards the actions of units of the armed forces or by individual soldiers, demonstrating expertise, responsibility and valour. The title may be given posthumously
  - Ordine al Merito del Lavoro (Order of Merit for Labour) for those who have worked with skilfulness, contributing to the development of the nation and improving the status of the workers
  - Ordine della Stella d'Italia (Order of the Star of Italy) for a contribution to the post-war reconstruction of Italy
  - Ordine di Vittorio Veneto (Order of Vittorio Veneto) for Italian soldiers of the First World War

In addition, the Orders of Chivalry of the Royal House of Savoy and other Italian dynasties may confer honorifics (Cavaliere and Dama), as do the Holy See and the Order of Malta. Oddly, the Italian Republic bestows the rank of knight but not that of dame, though ladies may be decorated with knightly rank.

== State-related honorifics ==
- Presidente – pres. (President): used for the President of the Republic, or for the President of the Senate, of the Chamber of Deputies, of the Council of Ministers (Prime Minister), of the Constitutional Court, of a Region Council, for Judges president of a Court
- Presidente emerito – pres. em. (Emeritus President): used for former President of the Republic
- Senatore – sen. (Senator): some are for life (ex-Presidents of the Republic and persons who 'glorified' the Country)
- Onorevole - on. (Honourable): member of the Chamber of Deputies and member of the municipal Council of Rome.
- Ministro – min. (Minister)
- Giudice (Judge)
- Console – cons. (Consul)

== Work/profession-related titles ==
- Dottore / Dottoressa – dott. (Doctor; in Italy it is used for any person holding a university degree, even a bachelor's. This often confuses foreigners.)
  - Dottore / Dottoressa magistrale - dott. mag. (Magistral Doctor; More specific title for people holding a laurea magistrale the Italian equivalent to a master degree)
  - Dottore / Dottoressa di ricerca - dott. ric. ( Doctor of research; More specific title for people holding a dottorato di ricerca the Italian equivalent to a Doctorate, this title is the equivalent of the English Doctor)
- Maestro / Maestra (teacher or expert artisan or musician)
  - Mastro (archaic for artisans)
- Professore – prof. / Professoressa – prof.ssa (Professor, used for university professors, and, informally only, for high school teachers and university lecturers)
  - Full professors in the university are most formally addressed as Chiarissimo Professor (Chiar.mo Prof.), derived from Latin clarus which meant famed. University headmasters (Rettore) are formally addressed as Magnifico Rettore (Magnificent Headmaster).

== Academic/professional qualification-related titles ==
- High school diplomas:
  - Ragioniere – rag. (business economics).
  - Geometra – geom. (land surveying and construction).
  - Perito – per. (degree of technical extraction in a specific branch, such as chemistry or mechanics or naval or nautical; in some cases, however, a perito holds no more than a three-year university laurea.)
  - Maestro / Maestra (degree from a music conservatory or educational program). Note, however, that grade-school teachers of all levels are frequently called "maestro" in common, everyday use, while high-school teachers are called "professore").
- University degrees:
  - Dottore – dott. (all people holding a laurea degree). The laurea was previously the only academic degree given by Italian Universities. With the Riforma Universitaria, the Italian system has moved closer to conformity with the rest of Europe and North America. Laurea may now refer to a three-year degree (the laurea triennale) or to a laurea magistrale, or master's degree, which requires two additional years of study. The former confers the title dottore; holders of the latter receive the academic title dottore magistrale.
  - Avvocato – avv. (Lawyer, a laurea specialistica in law and a state-exam are both required.)
  - Ingegnere – ing. (Engineer, a laurea specialistica in engineering and a state-exam are both required.)
  - Architetto – arch. (Architect, a laurea specialistica in architecture and a state-exam are both required.)
  - Dottore di Ricerca (holder of a Ph.D., literally "Doctor of Research").

== Roman Catholic Church titles ==
Besides normal titles, there are some honorifics that are peculiar to the Catholic Church, being found in European countries of Catholic tradition:

- Don/Dom - used for members of the secular clergy, more a form of address than a title as such, don comes from a medieval styling for very esteemed persons, it is a colloquial form of Dominus - the Latin for Lord, Sir. It is still used for Bishops, or citizens in some areas (as in Spain, Portugal and Latin America).
- prevosto: provost - title used in northern Italy and Tuscany for important parish priests.
- arciprete: archpriest - usually used for the senior priest in an important or significant town that is not a bishop's seat, i.e. not the centre of a diocese.
- curato: curate - parish priest of the countryside.
- canonico: canon - the senior priests attached to the cathedral, who have special liturgical and administrative responsibilities both there and in the diocese.

== Military titles of rank ==
- Esercito (Army): see Italian Army enlisted military ranks and Italian Army officers military ranks
- Marina Militare (Navy): see Naval officer ranks
- Aeronautica Militare (Air force)
- Carabinieri (gendarmerie): officers ranks are the same as in the Italian Army.

== Style for letters ==
Excluding special titles or antique versions, in Italy this is the manner of address in letters:

to men:	Egregio signor / Egr. sig.	lit. 'eminent' (equiv. 'Dear' Mr (Mister) [name] / [name]...Esq.)
to men or women:	Gentile signore/signora / Gentile sig./sig.^{ra}	lit. 'kind' or more etymologically 'from a distinguished family' (equiv. 'Dear' Mr / Mrs / Ms / Sir/Madam)
to agencies/organisations	Spettabile / Spett.^{le}	lit. 'esteemed' (equiv. 'Messrs.')

Other adjectives are also in use, although rarer, such as Esimio/a (distinguished), Illustre (illustrious) or Pregiatissimo/a (most prized). Since the late 20^{th} century, Gentile has started to be used also when addressing male people and, in some cases, the adjective has been substituted altogether by a greeting (e.g. Buongiorno signor Rossi, i.e. "Good morning, Mr Rossi").

== See also ==
- Italian orders of merit
- Military Order of Italy
