= Hokkaido Otaru Choryo High School =

High School in Otaru, Japan

Coordinates: 43.1784°N 141.0102°E

Hokkaido Otaru Choryo High School (北海道小樽潮陵高等学校, Hokkaidō Otaru Chōryō Kōtō Gakkō) is a high school in Otaru, Hokkaidō, Japan, founded in 1902. Hokkaido Otaru Choryo High School is one of high schools administrated by Hokkaido.

The school is operated by the Hokkaido Prefectural Board of Education.

== Notable alumni ==
- Masaki Kobayashi (小林 正樹) Film director
- Sei Itō (伊藤 整) Poet, novelist, and translator
- Emi Okazaki (岡崎 英美) Musician, and the keyboardist of Sakanaction
- Hiroshi Yoshizawa (吉沢 広司) Ski jumper
- Koji Kato (加藤 浩次) News caster and comedian
