= Asari Dam =

Dam in Hokkaidō Prefecture, Japan

Coordinates: 43°07′59″N 141°02′29″E

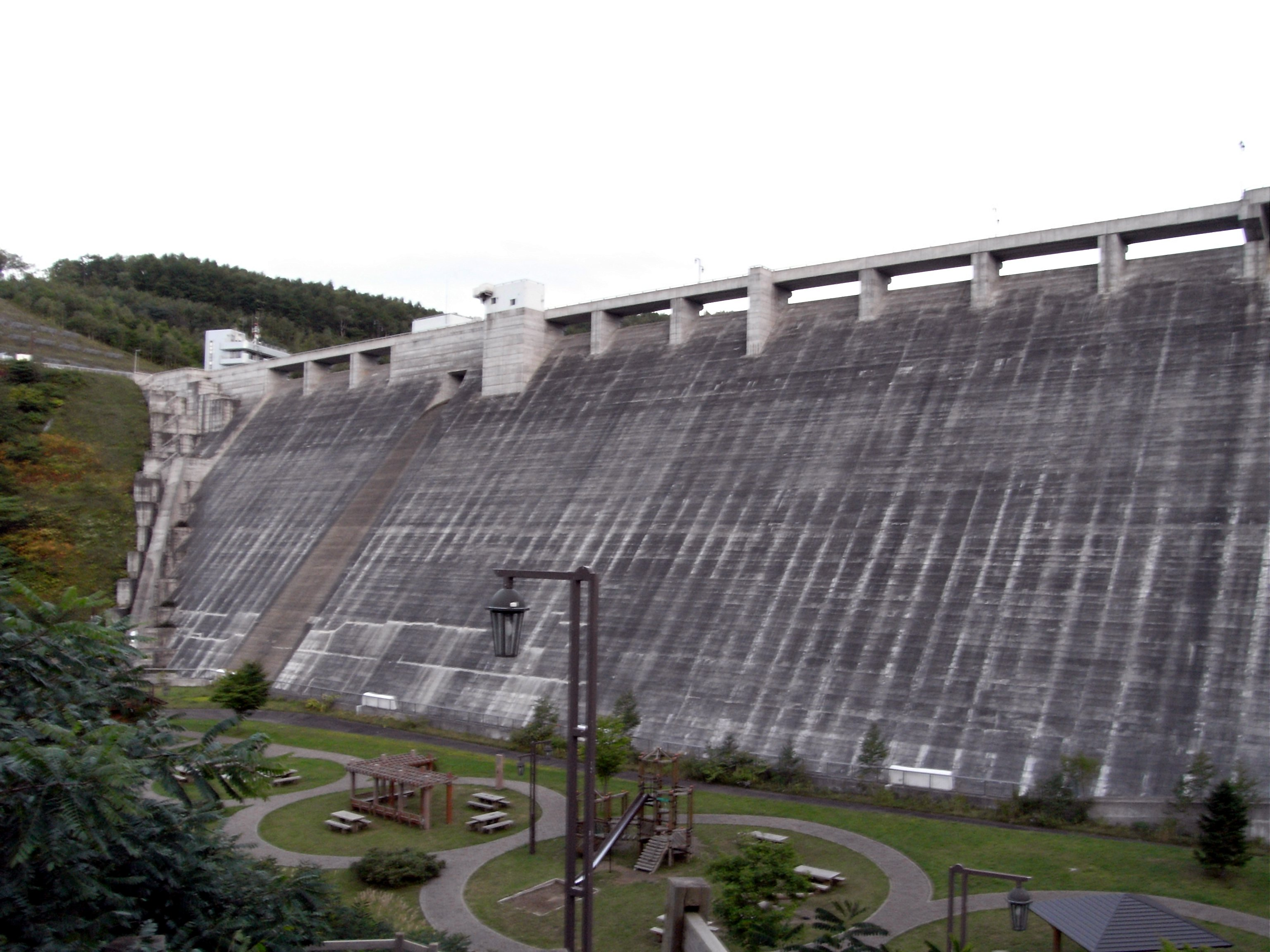
- Interactive map of Asari Dam
- Location: Otaru, Hokkaidō, Japan.
- Construction began: 1979
- Opening date: 1993

Dam and spillways
- Impounds: Asari River
- Height: 73.9 m
- Length: 390 m

Reservoir
- Total capacity: 8,800,000 m^{3}
- Catchment area: 56.8 km^{2}
- Surface area: 43 hectares

Asari Dam (朝里ダム) is a dam in Otaru, Hokkaidō, Japan, completed in 1993. It is a Gravity dam of 73.9 m which is currently managed by the Hokkaido Construction Department. The man-made lake which resulted from the construction of the dam is called Otarunai Lake.

== Construction ==
Construction of the dam began in 1979 and lasted until completion in 1993. Due to the planning of the dam's construction through the Hokkaido roadway, the roadway was modified in 1986 and the creation of the Asari Sky Loop.

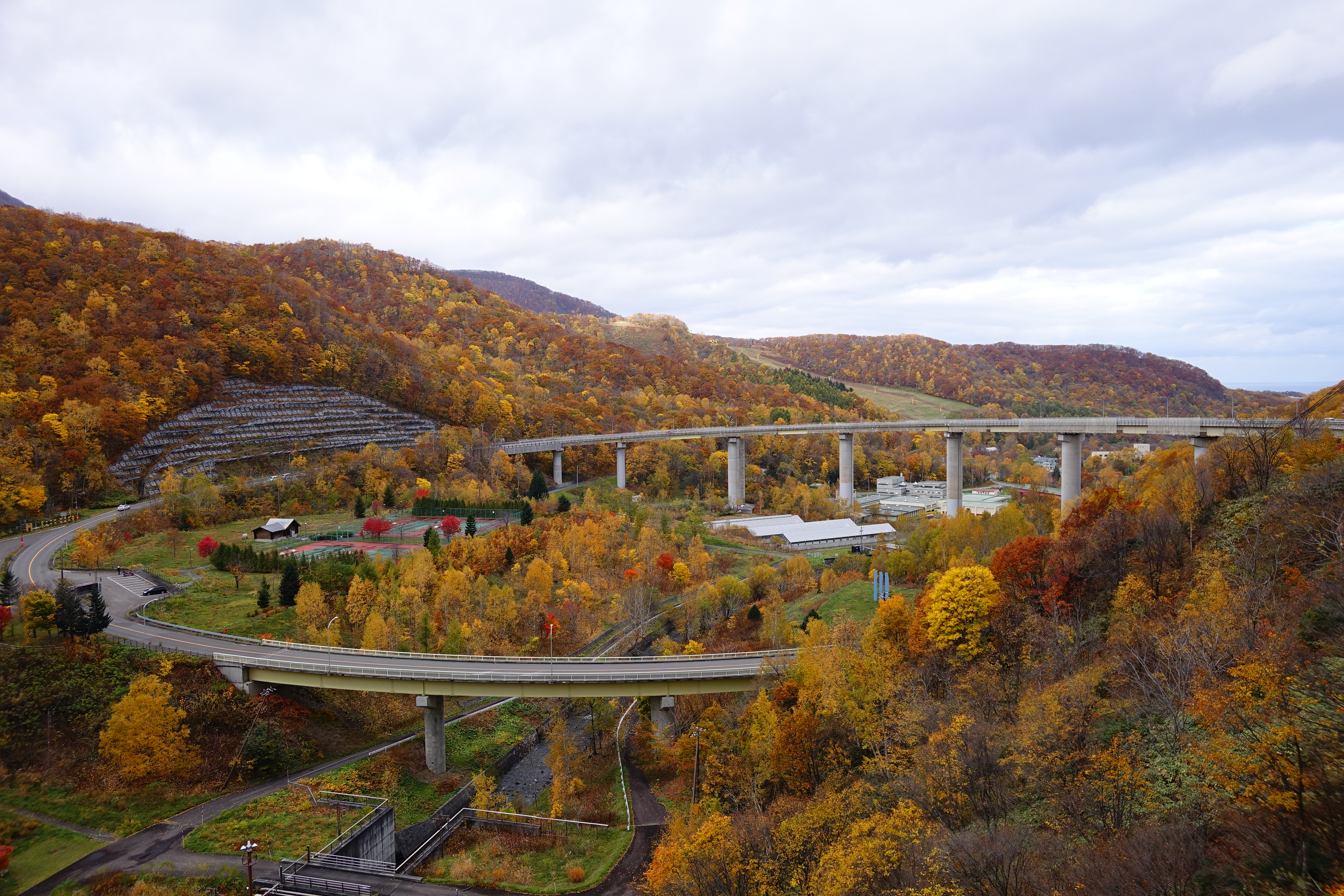
Asari Sky Loop

== Tourism ==
The artificial Otarunai lake was named by the citizens after an offer for public input was addressed. In 1994, the Otarunai Lakeside Park opened to the public and the Asari Dam Memorial building was constructed. It is also possible to walk on the dam during open hours. A tennis court and recreation facility were also completed. An Onsen is also located downstream from the dam.
