= Otaru Ankake Yakisoba =

Japanese dish

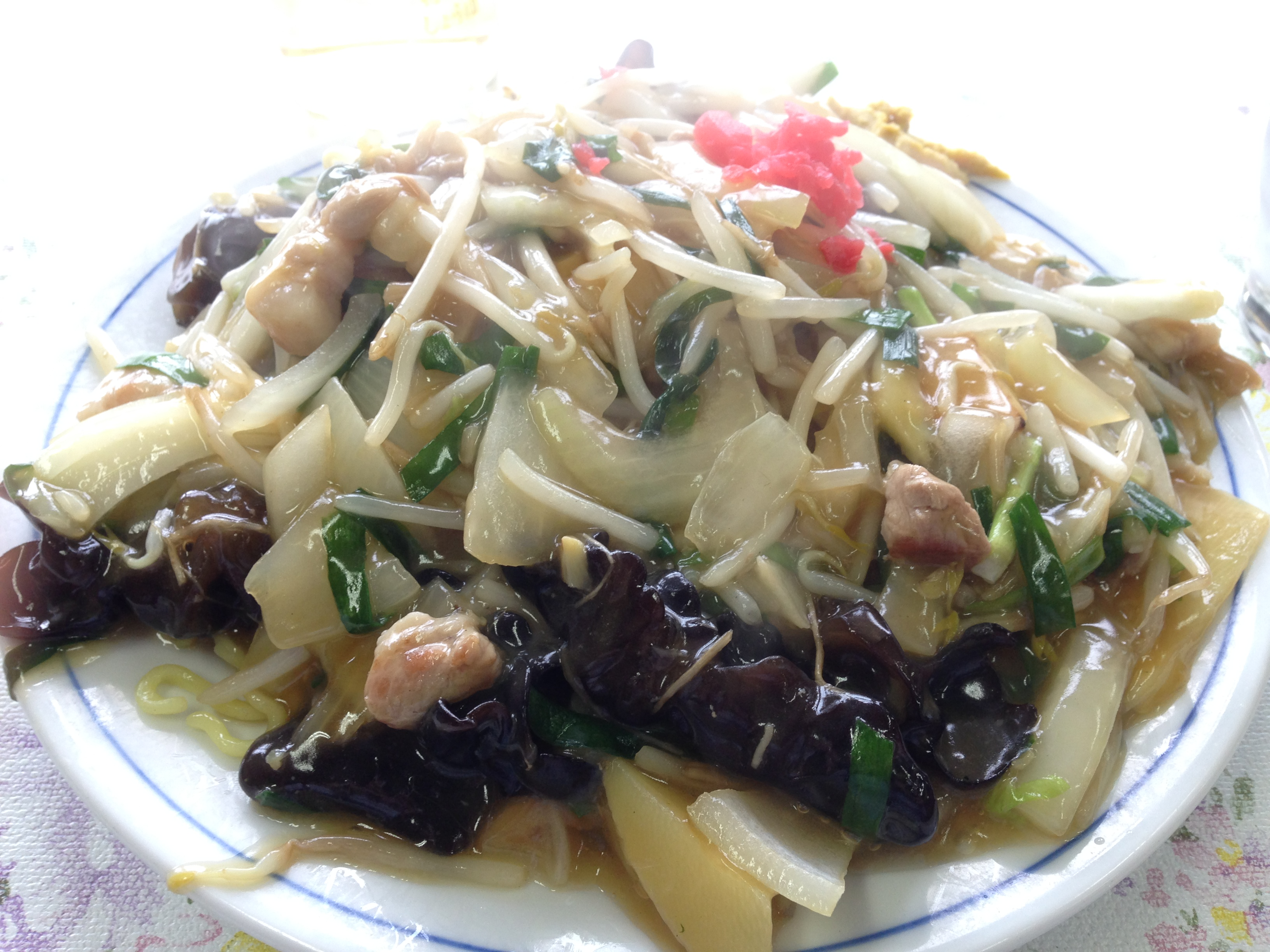
Ankake Yakisoba from Uushan Hanten restaurant in Hanazono, Otaru

Otaru Ankake Yakisoba is a variety of "Ankake Yakisoba" (stir-fried noodles with a starchy sauce) sold at many restaurants in Otaru, Hokkaido. The dish became prevalent within Otaru from the third decade of the Showa Period (1955–1964) and by the Heisei Period (1989–) was beloved by the people of Otaru. From the 2010s, in order to promote Otaru and combat the city's population decrease, a citizen's group made efforts to popularize the dish and it became known as a local delicacy.

== History ==
There are various theories about the origin of Otaru Ankake Yakisoba. One prominent theory is that it originated as 'Gomoku Ankake Yakisoba' (ankake yakisoba with a combination of meat, fish and vegetables) made by a Chinese restaurant called 'Baigetsu' that relocated to Inaho, Otaru in 1957 (Showa 32). At that time, the restaurant was comparatively accessible to tourists and gained popularity with the increasing numbers of backpackers. Additionally, amongst Otaru locals, it became commonplace to eat ankake yakisoba at the restaurant after a days shopping in the town centre. The second-generation owner of 'Baigetsu', Kondō Yūji, saw the restaurant into the height of its prosperity, was proactive in sharing the recipe with other local chefs and is seen as playing a vital part in the popularisation of ankake yakisoba in Otaru.

However, according to later research, other Chinese restaurants in Otaru, namely 'Restaurant Roll' and 'Rairaiken' were already serving ankake yakisoba in 1950 (Showa 25). When taking into consideration that ankake yakisoba was being made as a staff meal in Chinese restaurants all across Japan, it can be claimed that the origins of Otaru Ankake Yakisoba can be traced back further than 'Baigetsu'. There is another theory that ankake yakisoba was brought to Otaru in the prewar period by chefs from Tokyo and Kyoto employed at local hotels and ryōtei and became popular with workers at the port.

Whichever theory is true, it is thought that ankake yakisoba became widely popularised in Otaru in the third decade of the Showa Period (1955–1964), became a staple on restaurant menus due to it being filling and warming in the winter months and was considered a fashionable lunch option.

== Characteristics ==
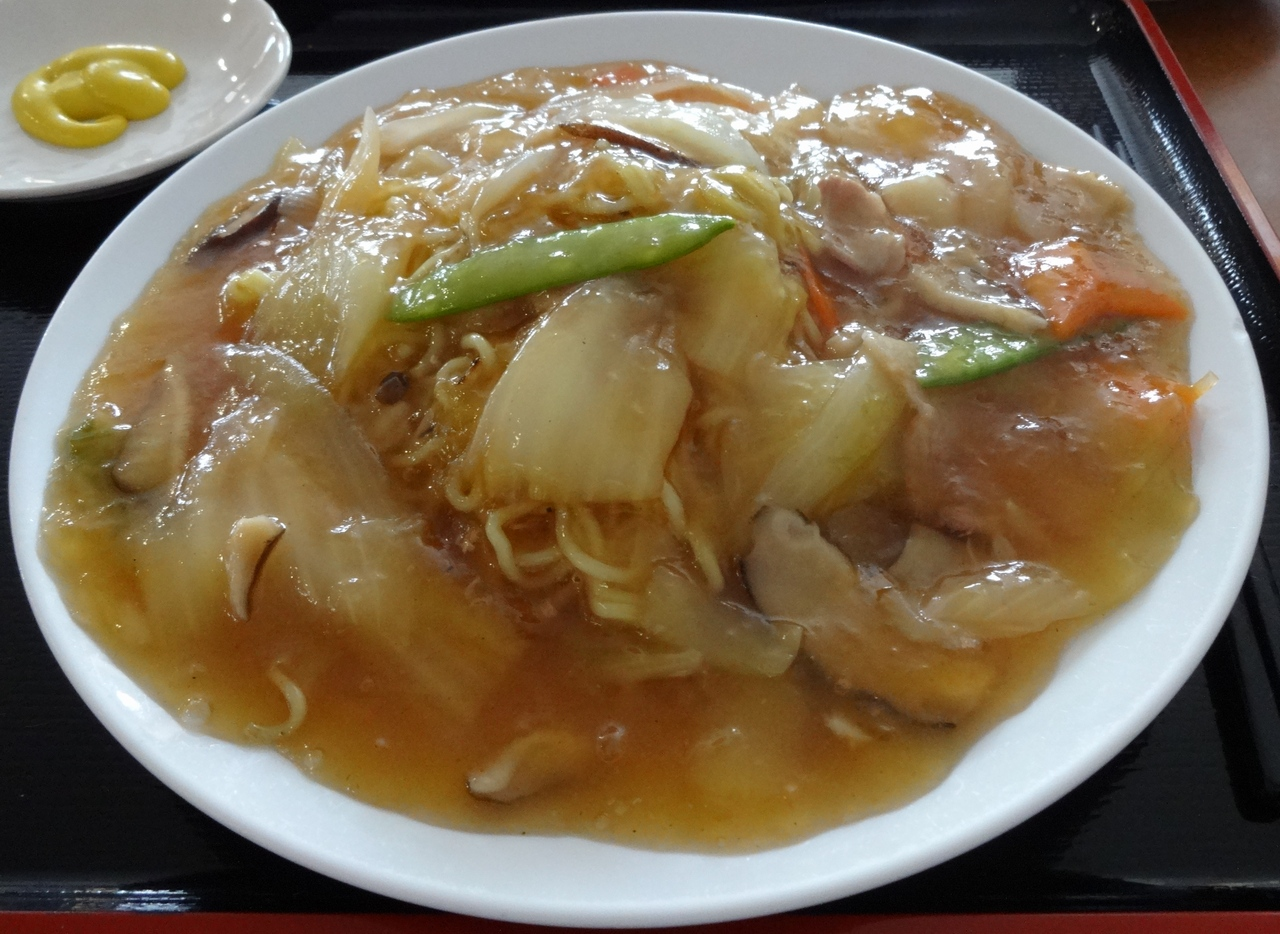
Ankake Yakisoba at the cafeteria of the 'Yu no Hana' bathhouse in Temiya and Shinkō, Otaru. The most popular item on the menu at one of the establishments listed in the 'Otaru Ankake Yakisoba Encyclopedia', mentioned below.

According to the citizens' group discussed below, the 'Otaru Ankake Yakisoba PR Committee', 'Otaru Ankake Yakisoba' is a general term referring to ankake yakisoba with a variety of vegetables and seafood, served in restaurants in and around Otaru. Another group, the 'Otaru Ankake Yakisoba Guard', certifies the ankake yakisoba of local restaurants.

Although the restaurants in Otaru do not all have a common recipe, fried noodles and a large amount of sauce are common characteristics. However, even these are not rules of Otaru Ankake Yakisoba, and each restaurant uses different recipes and ways of serving the dish, resulting in a wide range of flavours and variations on the dish. Otaru Ankake Yakisoba has a history of over 60 years, and it is thought that each restaurant plays a part in this history and that there as many versions of the dish as there are restaurants. Also, the aforementioned citizen's group made the choice to not create a strict definition or recipe for Otaru Ankake Yakisoba, instead deciding to respect each restaurant's originality.

Otaru Ankake Yakisoba is not just served at Chinese restaurants, but also such places as ramen restaurants, diners, cafeterias, Western-style restaurants, cafes, izakaya, hotels, bathhouses, mahjong parlours, ski resorts and golf pavilions. The fact that it is a popular item on the menu at each restaurant could also be considered a characteristic of the dish. The number of restaurants serving the dish is said to be close to 100. It is also said that in Otaru 'yakisoba' more often refers to ankake yakisoba than to regular yakisoba.

As Otaru is a port town with an abundance of fresh seafood, a dish including seafood is considered a very fitting speciality. However, the dish has been criticised as not being representative of Otaru as it contains a comparatively small proportion of local ingredients. There is also a view that the history of the dish is rooted in the people of Otaru, is part of the local cuisine and culture that has been preserved by the people for over 60 years, and is a trump card in the fight against Otaru's population decrease. In 2017 (Heisei 29) the opinion was expressed that Otaru Ankake Yakisoba is a speciality in the same way as sushi.

== Citizens' campaign ==
In the 2010s, Takada Hiroaki, the president of an Otaru-based noodle making company 'Shin Nihonkai Bussan', highlighting the fact that over half of the ramen restaurants in Otaru served ankake yakisoba, and that the percentage of customers ordering this dish had risen from 20 percent to 70 percent. In order to promote the dish as part of Otaru's unique food culture, on 1 July 2011 (Heisei 23) the 'Otaru Ankake Yakisoba PR Committee' was established, and between then and 2013 (Heisei 25) a cookery school was opened and an opportunity to collect stamps at restaurants around the town was introduced.

In 2012 (Heisei 24), Egashira Susumu, a professor at Otaru University of Commerce, founded and appointed himself president of the 'Otaru Ankake Yakisoba Protection Agency'. Although Otaru Ankake Yakisoba became an established dish amongst the townspeople served in almost 100 restaurants in Otaru, sushi remained the most popular cuisine amongst tourists and so volunteers conducted energetic efforts to change this. This organisation's goal was not just marketing and popularizing ankake yakisoba, but also using the dish to promote the town of Otaru; steps were made to use ankake yakisoba to promote Otaru's attractions, festivals and products. The aforementioned 'Otaru Ankake Yakisoba PR Committee' merged with the 'Otaru Ankake Yakisoba Protection Agency', which then begun conducting additional activities unrelated to the certification each restaurant's ankake yakisoba. Also, at the Otaru University of Commerce's school festival, 'Ryokkyūsai', the students of Egashira Susumu's seminar sold ankake yakisoba at a stand named the 'Egashira Restaurant'. The students received guidance from the chef of 'Ryūhō', a Chinese restaurant in Otaru. The chef occasionally stepped up to the frying pan himself, much to the delight of the attendees of the festival.

Following the 2011 Tōhoku earthquake and tsunami, both organisations conducted fund-raising at the city's restaurants and provided financial and material aid to families from Fukushima Prefecture taking refuge in Otaru. They also provided various support to victims of the disaster, such as discounts on orders of ankake yakisoba, and making ankake soba with Fukushima-grown vegetables in order to perform damage limitation against rumours surrounding the Fukushima Daiichi nuclear disaster.

However, a social movement started on an individual level before the establishment of either of the organisations, when a company worker and Otaru resident starting writing about restaurants serving ankake yakisoba on a personal blog in September 2010 (Heisei 22). The blog was named 'AKY48' after the female idol group AKB48, and aims to introduce 48 restaurants serving ankake soba. In June 2011, a popular vote held by the blog to determine the most popular restaurant, named the 'AKY Election' after the AKB Election, became a widely discussed topic in Otaru. Although this is a personal blog, it was introduced on the 'Otaru Ankake Yakisoba Protection Agency' official website as a pioneering web portal.

=== B-1 Grand Prix ===
In 2013, the 'Otaru Ankake Yakisoba Protection Agency' became an associate member of the 'Council for connecting organisations focused on town renewal through B-grade local cuisine', the general incorporated association that manages the festival of local cuisine. This marks the 'Otaru Ankake Yakisoba Protection Agency' making town renewal and engaging with volunteers, rather than monitoring restaurants, the focus of its activities. That year the 'B-1 Grand Prix Hokkaido/Tōhoku Region Convention' was a great success, with queues with waiting times of 150 minutes, and the recognition of ankake yakisoba increased exponentially.

In 2014 (Heisei 26), the 'Otaru Ankake Yakisoba Protection Agency' was promoted to a regular member of the B-1 Grand Prix. In October of the same year, Otaru Ankake Yakisoba made its debut at the 9th Nationwide B-1 Grand Prix in Kōriyama, Fukushima Prefecture and was ranked in 9th place. As a result of this appearance in the B-1 Grand Prix, Otaru Ankake Yakisoba became a recognisable term across Japan.

In 2015 (Heisei 27) Otaru Ankake Yakisoba was included, along with 7 other local cuisines from around Japan, on the new menu at the 'B-1 Grand Prix Cafeteria AKI-OKA CARAVANE', located beneath the elevated structure of JR Akihabara Station.(The cafeteria closed in 2016 (Heisei 28), the following year.)

== Publications ==
In 2013, due to the ideas of the 'Otaru Ankake Yakisoba Protection Agency' president, Egashira Susumu, and the actions of the 'Otaru University of Commerce' volunteers, the 'Otaru Ankake Yakisoba Encyclopedia' was created, compiling information on 64 restaurants, and sold from September of that year in Sapporo and Otaru bookshops. This publication aligned with Egashira's aims, analysing economic change based on an investigation of ankake yakisoba as a local delicacy.

Two weeks following the book's release the first press of 2000 copies was depleted and an additional 4000 copies were hurriedly printed. According to Egashira, publications produced by students introducing local culture exist all over Japan, yet sales rarely exceed 1000 copies so the demand for the 'Otaru Ankake Yakisoba Encyclopedia' was unprecedented. One bookshop in Otaru reported that the encyclopedia was selling rapidly, having sold 286 copies in two months, not far off the new book by Haruki Murakami, which sold 344 copies.

One restaurant featured in the encyclopedia is the Chinese restaurant 'Tōkōrō' in Inaho, Otaru. 'Tōkōrō' experienced a rise in customers due to people finding out about the restaurant through the book, and orders of ankake yakisoba increased by 10 percent. This shows a link between sales of the encyclopedia and sales of ankake yakisoba at the featured restaurants.

In 2017, a new edition of the 'Otaru Ankake Yakisoba Encyclopedia' was printed, reflecting new restaurants and taking out those that had closed.

== Merchandise ==
For a limited time between November and December 2011, Circle K Sunkus sold 'Otaru Ankake Yakisoba PR Committee' official ankake yakisoba at 190 stores across Hokkaido. In June 2014, Following the dish's first appearance in the 'B-1 Grand Prix', the product was sold again, under the supervision of the 'Otaru Ankake Yakisoba Protection Agency'. In October the product was brought back once again due to popular demand.

Lawson saw the popularity of the 'Otaru Ankake Yakisoba Encyclopedia' as an opportunity, and from February 2014 began selling 'Otaru Ankake Yakisoba' at 600 stores across Hokkaido. The sales of Lawson's yakisoba-based products often reach 10,000 in the month of release and then virtually disappear the following month. The sales of Otaru Ankake Yakisoba reached 52,000 in the first month and sold a further 26,000 in the second month, becoming the best selling yakisoba-based product in Lawson's history. The sales of yakisoba-based products at Lawson stores in Hokkaido experienced an 80 percent increase on the corresponding period of the previous year. This meant that the sales of all noodle-based products raised 2 percent, making Hokkaido the only region to see a sales increase on these products. This meant that in March of that year 'Otaru Ankake Yakisoba' was changed from a limited edition product to a permanent product.

After the dish's appearance in the B-1 Grand Prix there was demand from the rest of Japan, particularly West Japan, for it to be sold as a souvenir and as a meal kit in supermarkets. From 2014 it was available as a meal kit, and as a souvenir within Otaru and at JR Sapporo Station.

In 2016, under the supervision of the 'Otaru Ankake Yakisoba Protection Agency', the Otaru-based noodle production company, 'Abe Seimen', started selling an original sauce that replicates the flavour of 'Otaru Ankake Yakisoba'.

== Sources ==
- 小樽商科大学江頭ゼミ (September 2013). 小樽あんかけ焼そば事典. コア・アソシエイツ.
- 志村直 (23 April 2014). "小樽名物「あんかけ焼そば」絶好調「B-1」全国大会出場へ". 北海道新聞 朝刊. コア・アソシエイツ.
- 志村直 (10 April 2014). "小樽あんかけ焼そば超人気 ローソン 2カ月で7万8000個 販売無期限延長、リニューアルも". 北海道新聞 樽A版. オー・プラン. 雑誌 86039-12. Archived from the original on 17 April 2014.
- 千石涼太郎 (19 November 2013). 不思議の大地 なまら北海道. 廣済堂出版. ISBN 978-4-331-51586-0.
- 米林千晴 (29 January 2011). "「AKY48」にご注目!". 北海道新聞 樽C版 朝刊.
- 米林千晴 (28 October 2014). "B-1グランプリ 盛り上げた道内勢 ご当地グルメ 市民と歩む". 北海道新聞 朝刊. Archived from the original (PDF) on 17 April 2014.
- 千石涼太郎 (2013). 森香織他編 (ed.). TRAVEL・STYLE北海道 2014. SEIBIDO MOOK Guide Series. 成美堂出版. ISBN 978-4-415-11092-9.
- 米林千晴 (29 January 2011). 山本祐介編 (ed.). "るるぶ 札幌小樽 富良野 旭山動物園 '14". 北海道新聞 樽C版 朝刊. JTBパブリッシング.
- 志村直 (19 November 2013). 「あんかけ焼そば事典」人気熱々 樽商大生が出版 4000部増刷 熱い営業も実結ぶ」 ["Encyclopedia of Ankake Yakisoba" Sparks Hot Popularity: Otaru University of Commerce Students Publish Book; 4,000 Additional Copies Printed; Passionate Sales Efforts Pay Off]. 『北海道新聞』、樽B版 朝刊、 (in Japanese). p. 29.
- 米林千晴 (1 November 2014). "小樽土産に「あんかけ焼そば」 B-1入賞の味 商品化". 読売新聞 朝刊. 読売新聞社. Archived from the original (PDF) on 31 January 2015.
- 小樽商科大学江頭ゼミ (10 October 2017). 小樽あんかけ焼きそば事典2017 [Otaru Ankake Yakisoba Encyclopedia 2017] (in Japanese).
