= Otaru =

Otaru 小樽市
- City
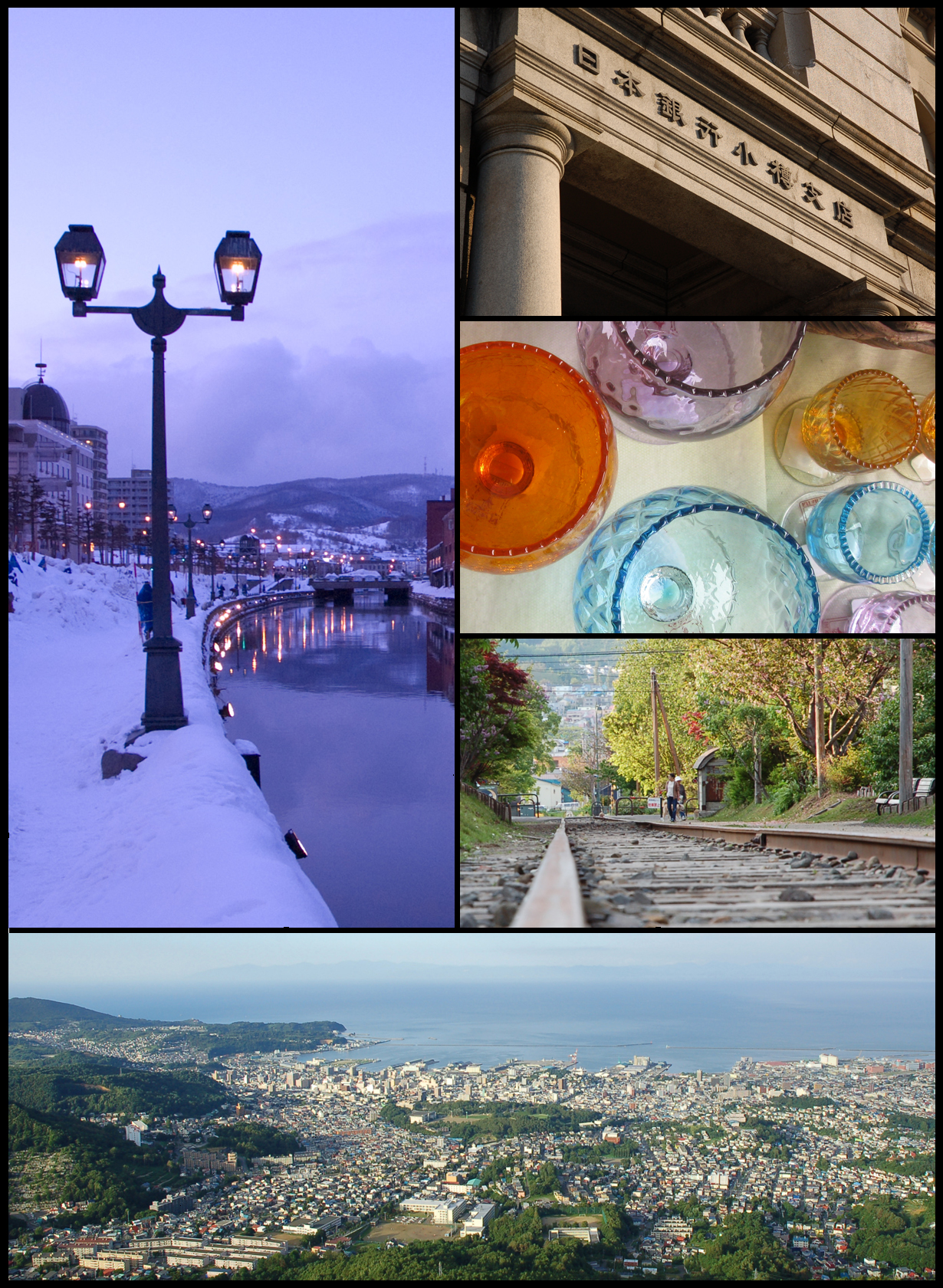
- Top left: Otaru Canal; Top right: The Bank of Japan Otaru Museum; Middle right 1: - Glass Works in Otaru; Middle right 2: - Temiya old railway line Bottom: - Vista from Mount Tengu

- Flag Seal

- Location of Otaru in Hokkaido

- Coordinates: 43°11′N 141°0′E
- Country: Japan
- Region: Hokkaido
- Prefecture: Hokkaido (Shiribeshi Subprefecture)

Government
  - Mayor: Toshiya Hazama (from August 2018)

Area
  - Total: 243.83 km^{2} (94.14 sq mi)

Population (July 31, 2023)
  - Total: 107,432
  - Density: 440.60/km^{2} (1,141.2/sq mi)
- Time zone: UTC+9 (Japan Standard Time)
- Phone number: 0134-32-4111
- Address: 2-12-1 Hanazono, Otaru-shi, Hokkaido; 047-8660
- Climate: Dfb
- Website: www.city.otaru.lg.jp
- Symbols
- Bird: Aobato (Japanese Green Pigeon)
- Flower: Azalea
- Tree: Shirakaba (Siberian Silver Birch)

Otaru (小樽市, Otaru-shi; Japanese pronunciation: [ó̞.tä̀.ɾɯ̈̀, ò̞.tä́.ɾɯ̈́.ɕì]) is a city and port in Shiribeshi Subprefecture, Hokkaido, Japan, northwest of Sapporo. The city faces Ishikari Bay and the Sea of Japan, and has long served as the main port of the bay. With its many historical buildings, Otaru is a popular tourist destination. Because it is a 25-minute drive from Sapporo, it has grown as a commuter town. As of July 31, 2023, the city had an estimated population of 107,432 and a population density of 441 persons per km^{2} (1,100 persons per mi^{2}). The total area is 243.83 km^{2} (94.14 sq mi). Although it is the largest city in Shiribeshi Subprefecture, the subprefecture's capital is the more centrally located Kutchan.

== History ==
The name "Otaru" is of Ainu origin, possibly meaning "River running through the sandy beach". The very small remaining part of the Temiya Cave contains carvings from the Zoku-Jōmon period of Ainu history, around A.D. 400. Mount Akaiwa (Northwest part of Otaru) is memorialized in the Ainu tradition in the story of Sitonai, village chief's teenage daughter who had slain a white snake from the mountain's cave that demanded sacrifices of girls every year. The legend explains the name of a big cave on Mount Akaiwa, Hakuryu Gongen Cave (白竜権現洞窟, lit. "White Dragon Gongen Cave") and the reason why a shrine was built on the mountain (to protect the village from being haunted by the snake).

Otaru was recognised as a village by the bakufu in 1865, and in 1880 the first railway line in Hokkaido was opened with daily service between Otaru and Sapporo.

An Imperial decree in July 1899 established Otaru as an open port for trading with the United States and the United Kingdom.

The city flourished well as the financial and business center in Hokkaido as well as the trade port with Japanese ruled southern Sakhalin until the 1920s. Otaru was redesignated as a city on August 1, 1922.

On December 27, 1924, a freight train loaded with 600 cases of dynamite, unloaded from the freighter Shoho Maru, exploded in Temiya Station, killing 94 people and injuring 200 more, in addition to damaging the warehouse, the harbour facilities, and the surrounding area.

During World War II, Otaru housed a prison camp for Aleuts. They were forcefully taken there following the Japanese occupation of Attu, which is part of Alaska's Aleutian Islands chain in the Northern Pacific. Nearly half of the Aleuts at the camp died from starvation or the spread of illnesses such as tuberculosis, while their children there were forced to learn Japanese. During the closing stages of the war, Otaru was bombed by American naval aircraft in July 1945.

Since the 1950s, as the coal industry around the city went into a decline, the status of the economic hub shifted from Otaru to Sapporo.

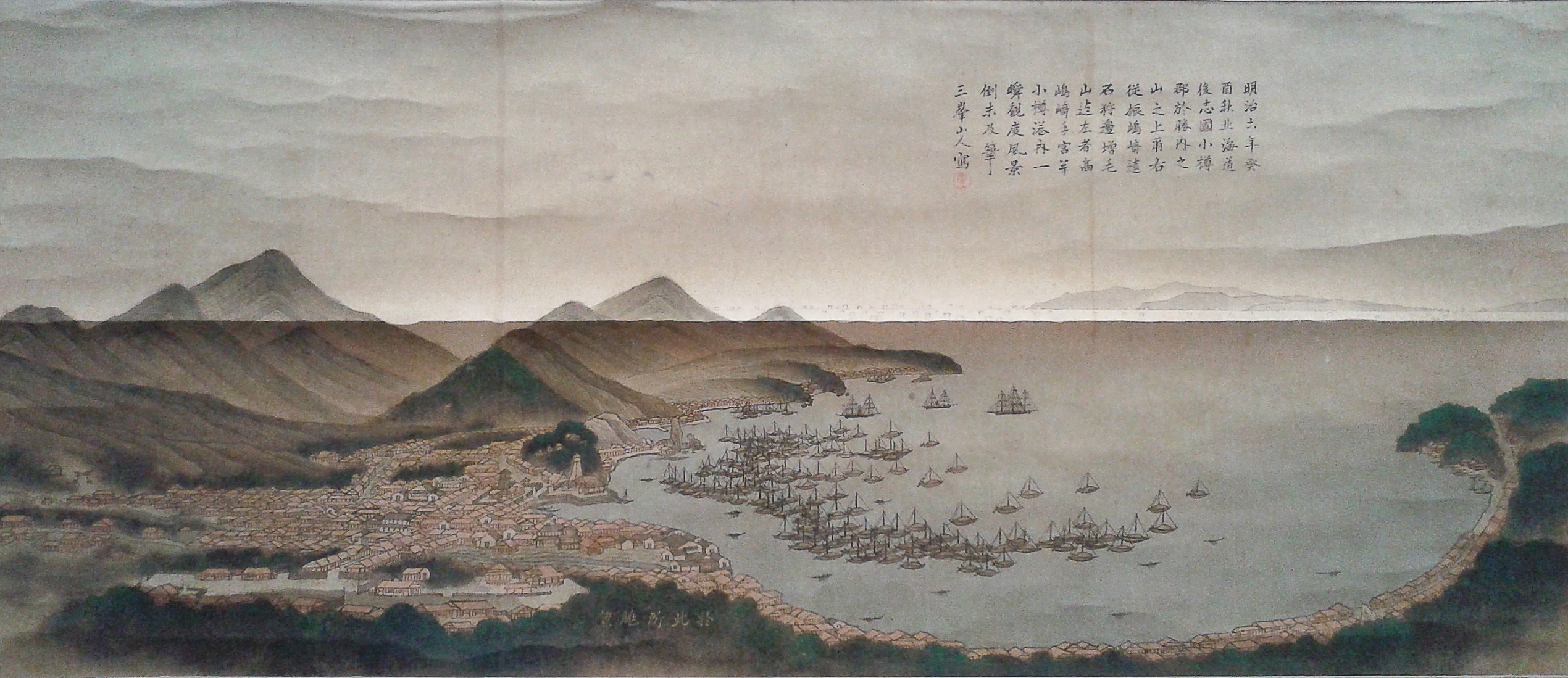
Otaru in 1876

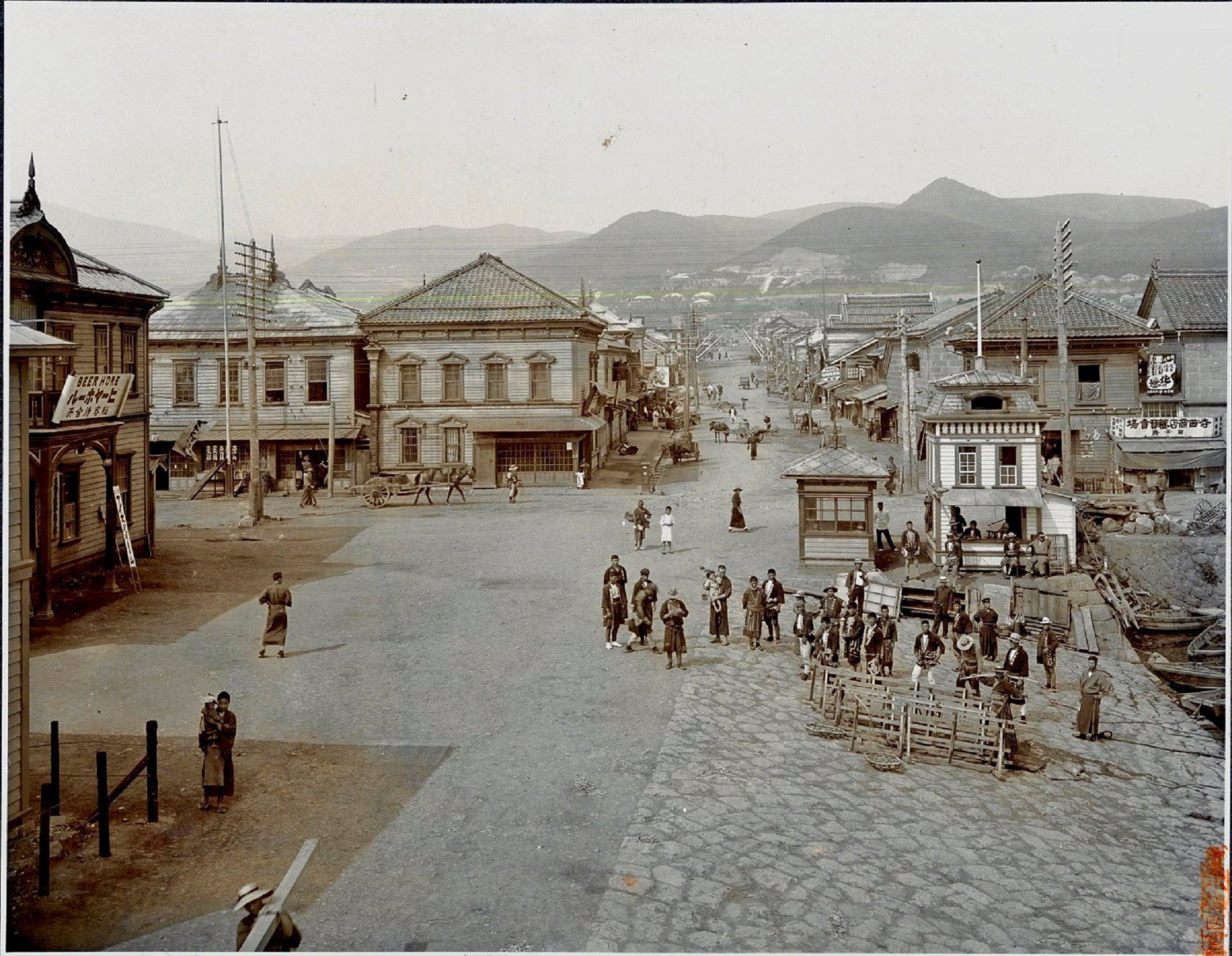
Otaru in 1909

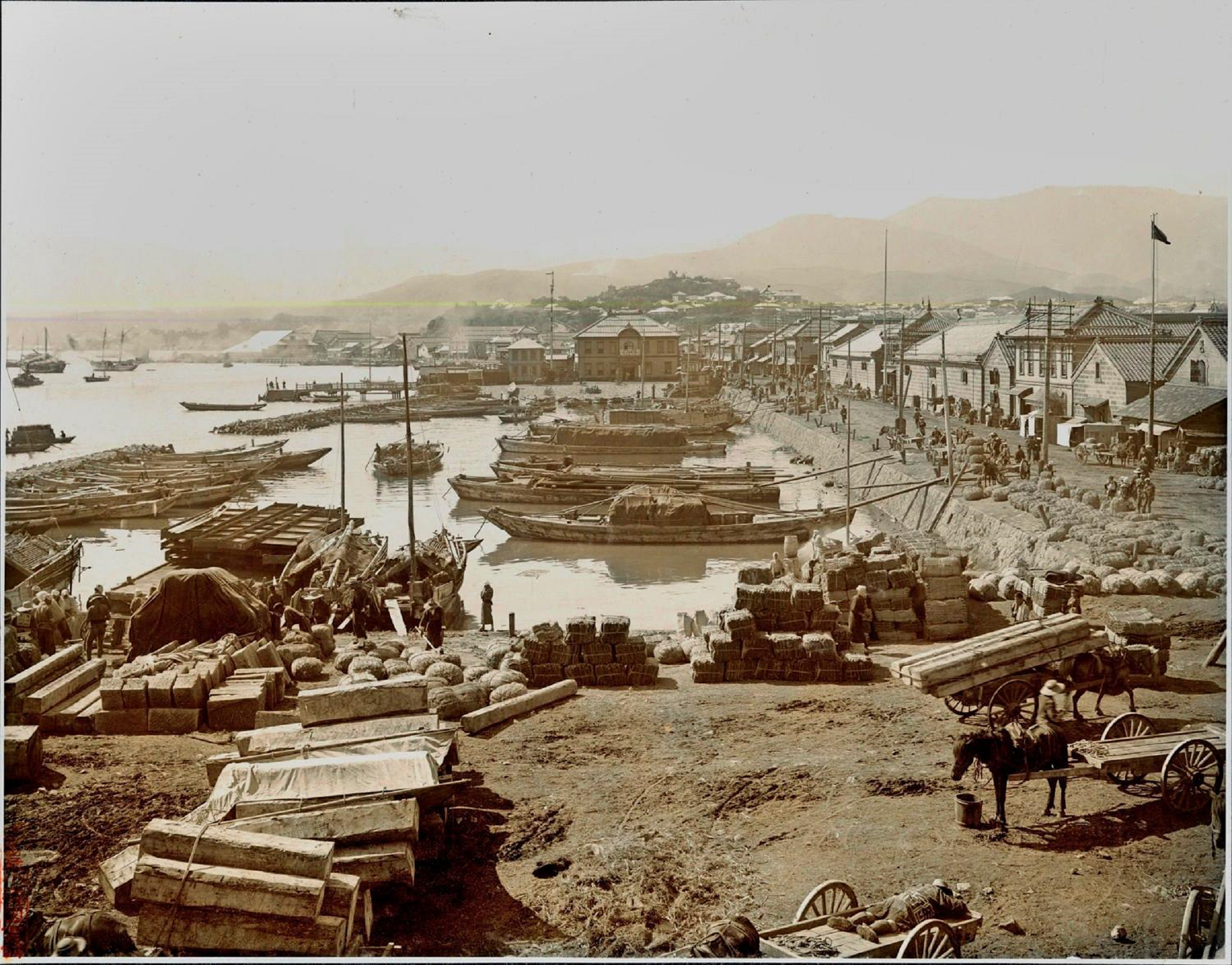
Otaru port in 1909

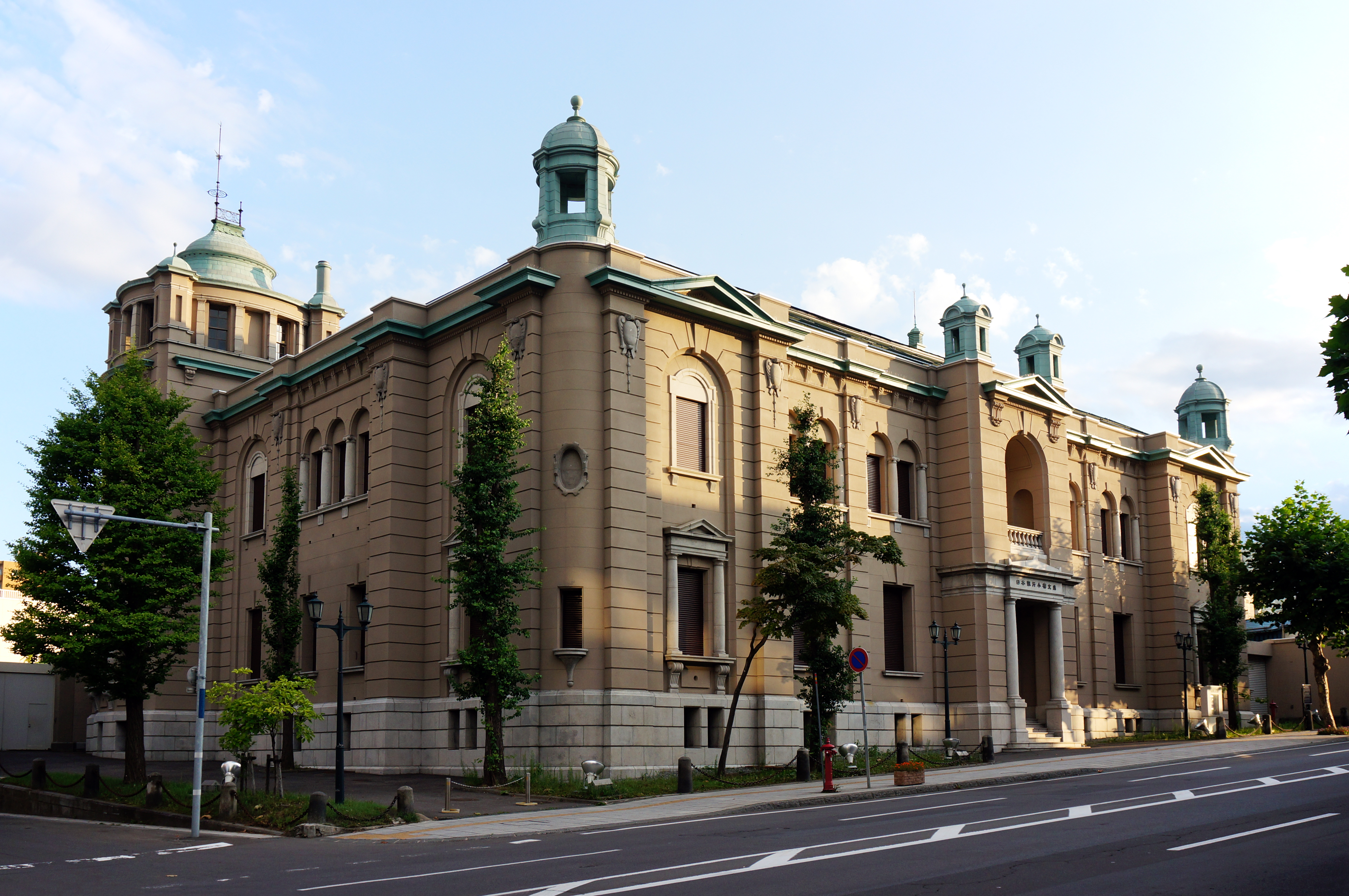
Former Bank of Japan Otaru Branch, now home to the Otaru Museum

== Geography ==
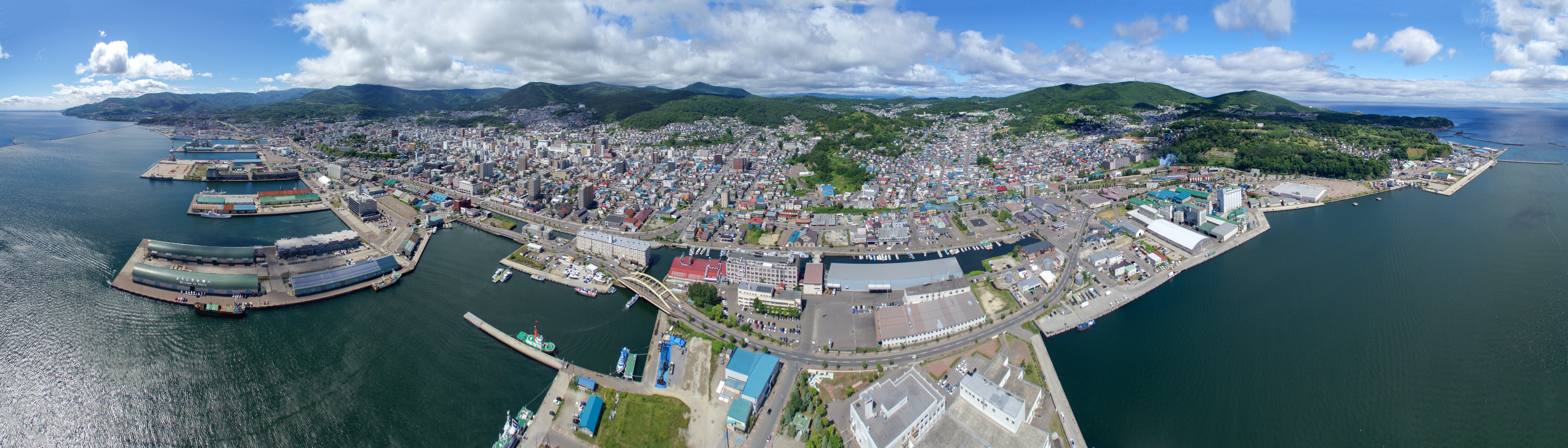
An aerial panoramic view of the town from above the Sea of Japan

Otaru is a port town on the coast of the Sea of Japan in northern Shiribeshi Subprefecture. The southern portion of the city is characterized by the steep slopes of various mountains (notably Tenguyama), where the altitude of the land sharply drops from the mountains to the sea. The land available between the coast and mountains has been almost completely developed, and the developed part of the city on the mountain slopes is called Saka-no-machi, or "Hill town", including hills named Funamizaka (Boat-view Hill) and Jigokuzaka (Hell Hill).

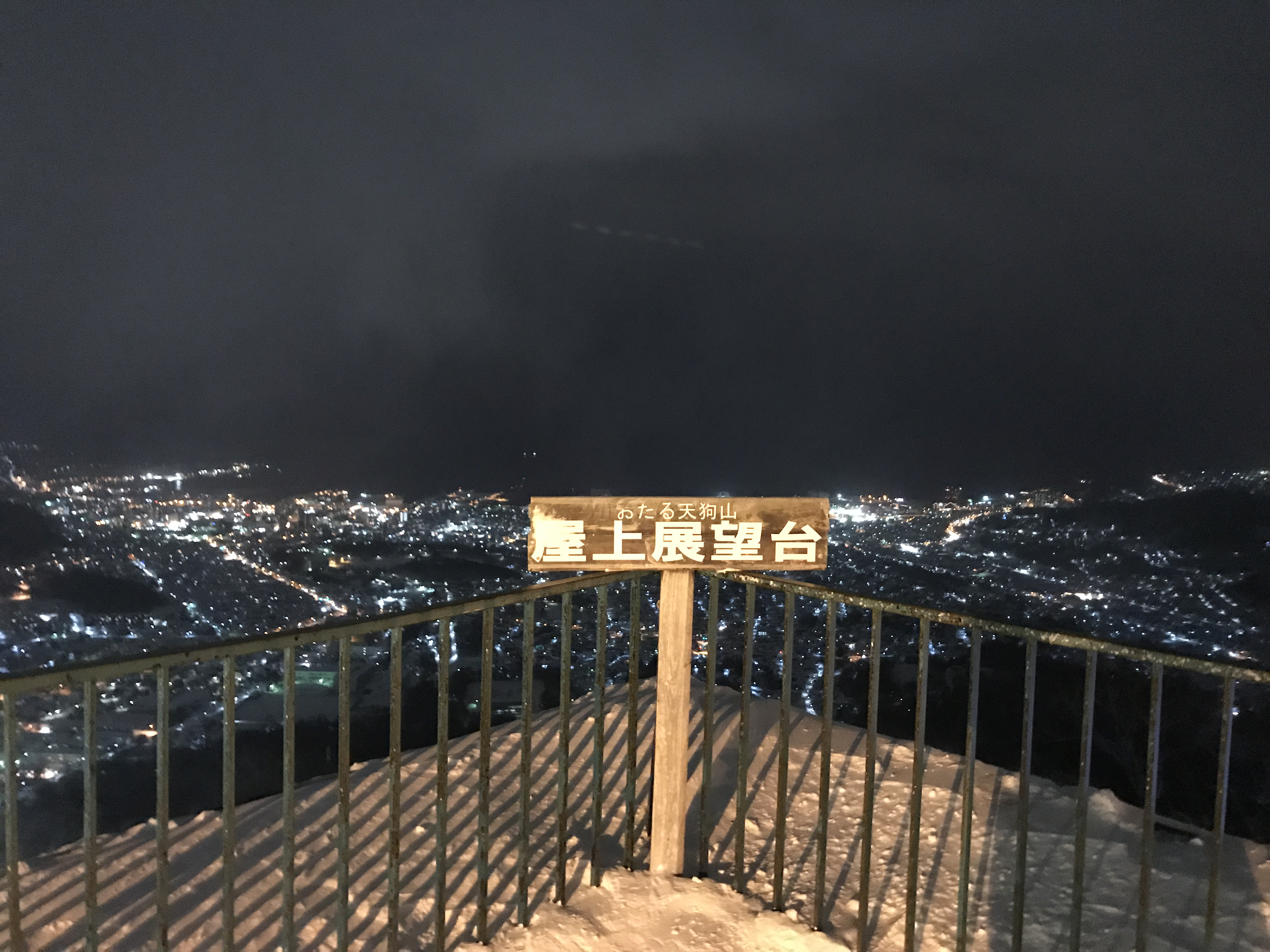
Tengu mountain

=== Neighboring cities and towns ===
- Ishikari
  - Sapporo (Teine-ku, Minami-ku), Ishikari
- Shiribeshi
  - Yoichi District: Yoichi, Akaigawa

=== Rivers ===
Some of the rivers in Otaru are: Hoshioki, Kiraichi, Zenibako, Hariusu, Asari, Katsunai, Shioya, Myoken, Irifune.

== Climate ==
In the summer the weather, like all of western Hokkaido, is very warm and balmy, with a maximum temperature of around 25 °C (77 °F) and high humidity – not as hot as southern Japan. In the winter, however, Otaru is very snowy, receiving as much as 6.6 metres (260 in) of snow from November to March, when it snows almost constantly and sunshine levels are extremely low. The average maximum snow cover is 1.22 metres (48 in). Extreme temperatures have ranged from 36.2 °C (97.2 °F) on July 28, 2021, to −18.0 °C (−0.4 °F) on January 24, 1954, in which month the highest snowfall of 3.1 metres (122 in) occurred. Monthly precipitation totals in a record dating back to 1943 have ranged from 379.8 millimetres (15.0 in) in August 1962 to 12.0 millimetres (0.5 in) in June 2007.

Climate data for Otaru (elevation 24.9 m, 1991–2020 normals, extremes 1943–present)
Month	Jan	Feb	Mar	Apr	May	Jun	Jul	Aug	Sep	Oct	Nov	Dec	Year
Record high °C (°F)	11.0 (51.8)	15.7 (60.3)	16.9 (62.4)	27.6 (81.7)	30.2 (86.4)	31.9 (89.4)	36.2 (97.2)	34.9 (94.8)	33.6 (92.5)	28.8 (83.8)	21.8 (71.2)	15.2 (59.4)	36.2 (97.2)
Mean maximum °C (°F)	5.9 (42.6)	7.5 (45.5)	12.2 (54.0)	20.6 (69.1)	26.1 (79.0)	27.7 (81.9)	30.7 (87.3)	31.3 (88.3)	28.6 (83.5)	22.4 (72.3)	17.2 (63.0)	9.8 (49.6)	32.2 (90.0)
Mean daily maximum °C (°F)	−0.5 (31.1)	0.2 (32.4)	4.1 (39.4)	10.9 (51.6)	16.9 (62.4)	20.4 (68.7)	24.2 (75.6)	25.6 (78.1)	22.3 (72.1)	15.9 (60.6)	8.3 (46.9)	1.6 (34.9)	12.5 (54.5)
Daily mean °C (°F)	−3.1 (26.4)	−2.7 (27.1)	0.8 (33.4)	6.5 (43.7)	12.1 (53.8)	16.0 (60.8)	20.2 (68.4)	21.7 (71.1)	18.1 (64.6)	11.8 (53.2)	4.9 (40.8)	−1.1 (30.0)	8.8 (47.8)
Mean daily minimum °C (°F)	−5.8 (21.6)	−5.7 (21.7)	−2.4 (27.7)	2.6 (36.7)	7.9 (46.2)	12.5 (54.5)	17.1 (62.8)	18.4 (65.1)	14.3 (57.7)	7.9 (46.2)	1.6 (34.9)	−3.8 (25.2)	5.4 (41.7)
Mean minimum °C (°F)	−11.0 (12.2)	−10.9 (12.4)	−7.6 (18.3)	−1.6 (29.1)	2.9 (37.2)	7.8 (46.0)	12.8 (55.0)	14.1 (57.4)	9.3 (48.7)	2.6 (36.7)	−4.8 (23.4)	−8.7 (16.3)	−11.9 (10.6)
Record low °C (°F)	−18.0 (−0.4)	−17.2 (1.0)	−14.1 (6.6)	−6.4 (20.5)	0.0 (32.0)	4.5 (40.1)	9.0 (48.2)	8.9 (48.0)	2.6 (36.7)	−1.4 (29.5)	−9.1 (15.6)	−13.5 (7.7)	−18.0 (−0.4)
Average precipitation mm (inches)	138.1 (5.44)	106.6 (4.20)	87.3 (3.44)	56.4 (2.22)	53.7 (2.11)	55.6 (2.19)	93.6 (3.69)	131.3 (5.17)	131.7 (5.19)	123.0 (4.84)	152.4 (6.00)	151.9 (5.98)	1,281.6 (50.46)
Average snowfall cm (inches)	157 (62)	130 (51)	80 (31)	7 (2.8)	0 (0)	0 (0)	0 (0)	0 (0)	0 (0)	0 (0)	36 (14)	142 (56)	556 (219)
Average precipitation days (≥ 0.5 mm)	26.0	22.2	19.7	12.9	10.7	9.2	10.2	10.9	12.7	16.3	21.3	24.5	196.8
Average snowy days	29.8	25.7	22.8	7.6	0.2	0.0	0.0	0.0	0.0	1.6	14.9	28.5	131.2
Average relative humidity (%)	71	70	66	64	69	78	81	78	73	69	69	71	72
Mean monthly sunshine hours	63.5	78.2	128.8	175.5	200.6	170.4	163.3	167.7	159.8	139.7	79.6	59.0	1,586.2
Source: Japan Meteorological Agency (1991–2020 normals, extremes 1943–present)

== Demographics ==
Historical population

Year	Pop.	±% p.a.
1920	108,113	—
1925	134,469	+4.46%
1930	144,887	+1.50%
1935	153,587	+1.17%
1940	164,282	+1.36%
1945	145,510	−2.40%
1950	178,330	+4.15%
1955	188,448	+1.11%
1960	198,511	+1.05%
1965	196,711	−0.18%
1970	191,856	−0.50%

Year	Pop.	±% p.a.
1975	184,406	−0.79%
1980	180,702	−0.40%
1985	172,486	−0.93%
1990	163,211	−1.10%
1995	157,022	−0.77%
2000	150,687	−0.82%
2005	142,161	−1.16%
2010	131,970	−1.48%
2015	121,924	−1.57%
2020	111,299	−1.81%
2025	100,404	−2.04%

Source: Statistics Bureau

== List of mayors (from 1923 to present) ==
Name	In office
Tota Sayanagi (佐柳藤太)	August 16, 1923 – February 25, 1925
Fumihiko Kitagawa (木田川奎彦)	September 19, 1925 – November 11, 1932
Miyakichi Itaya (板谷宮吉)	December 11, 1933 – December 10, 1937
Naotaka Kawahara (河原直孝)	April 5, 1938 – May 10, 1945
Kokichi Fukuoka (福岡幸吉)	June 1, 1945 – November 12, 1946
Eitaro Suhara (寿原英太郎)	April 2, 1947 – April 6, 1951
Yogoro Adachi (安達与五郎)	April 25, 1951 – April 29, 1967
Yu Inagaki (稲垣祐)	April 30, 1967 – April 29, 1975
Kazuo Shimura (志村和雄)	April 30, 1975 – April 29, 1987
Masaaki Shintani (新谷昌明)	April 30, 1987 – April 29, 1999
Katsuma Yamada (山田勝麿)	April 30, 1999 – April 29, 2011
Yoshiharu Nakamatsu (中松義治)	April 30, 2011 – April 29, 2015
Hideaki Morii (森井秀明)	April 30, 2015 – August 25, 2018
Toshiya Hazama (迫俊哉)	August 26, 2018 – present

== Transportation ==
- JR Hokkaido stations on the Hakodate Main Line: Ranshima - Shioya - Otaru - Minami-Otaru - Otaru-Chikkō - Asari - Zenibako
- Otaru Port Ferry Terminal (a Shin Nihonkai Ferry operates two ferries daily)

The nearest airports are New Chitose Airport 87 km (54 mi) to the south and Okadama Airport 37 km (23 mi) to the southeast.

== Education ==
=== Universities ===
==== National ====
- Otaru University of Commerce

=== High schools ===
==== Public ====
Prefectural

- Hokkaido Otaru Choryo High School
- Hokkaido Otaru Create Futures High School
- Hokkaido Otaru Fisheries High School
- Hokkaido Otaru Ouyou High School

==== Private ====
- Hokusho High School
- Otaru Futaba High School
- Otaru Meihou High School (also spelled "Meiho")

=== Former ===
- Hokkaido Otaru Commercial High School
- Hokkaido Otaru Technical High School
- Otaru Junior College

== Notable attractions ==
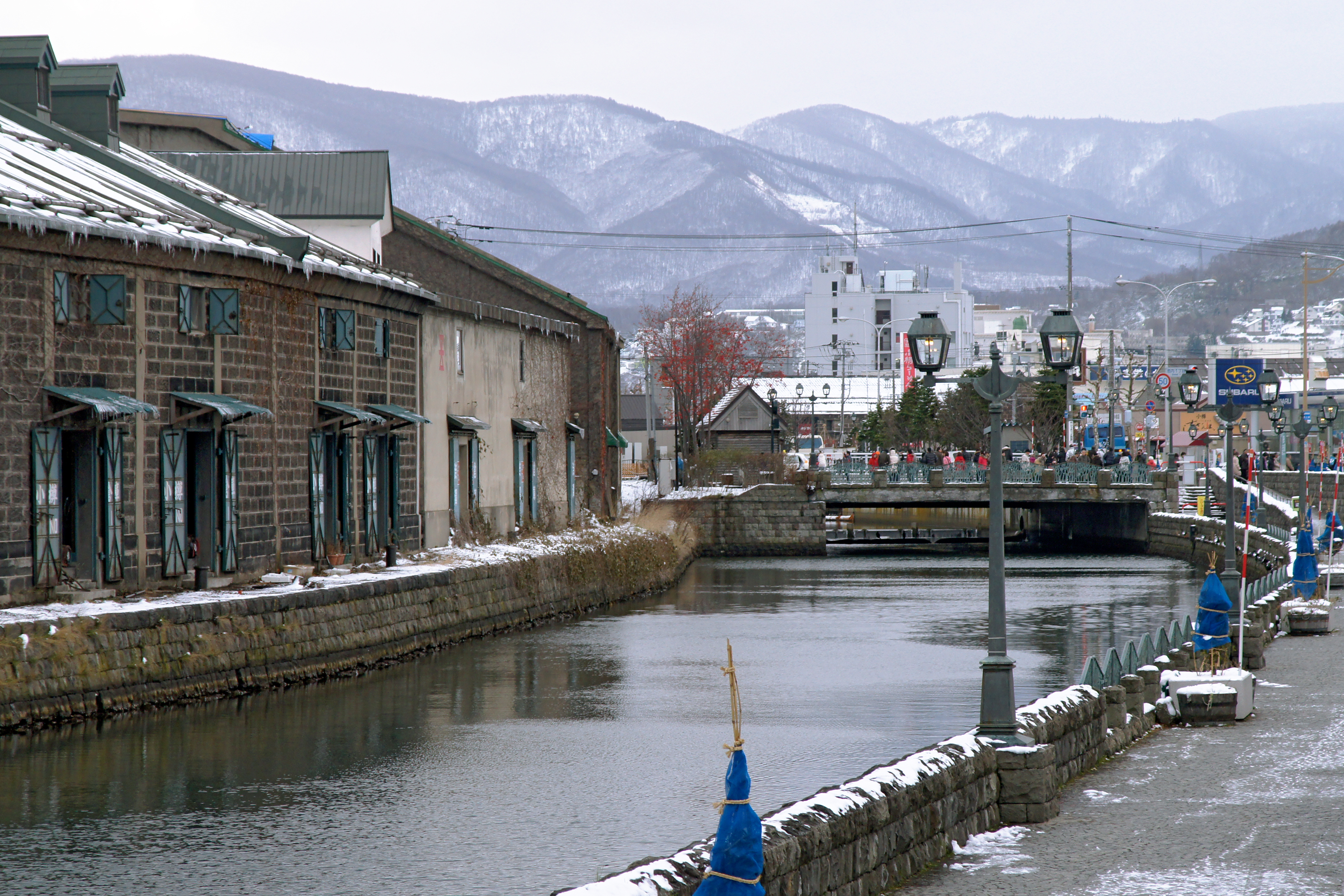
A view of Otaru Canal

A canal adorned with Victorian-style street lamps runs through Otaru. The city attracts a large number of Japanese as well as foreign tourists.

A popular attraction on the west side of the city is Nishin Goten (herring mansion). This large wooden building was built in 1897 and was once the house of Fukumatsu Tanaka, a fishing magnate. It was originally built in nearby Tomari village and moved in 1958. Visitors can clearly see the difference between the squalid conditions of the first-floor sleeping quarters of 120 workers and the ground-floor luxury of the magnate's rooms.

Another notable building is the Sakaushi residence, constructed by Yoshiya Tanoue, a pupil of Frank Lloyd Wright.

The city is home to Otaru Aquarium, which is recognized by the Ministry of Education, Culture, Sports, Science and Technology as a facility equivalent to a museum under the Museum Law and is the oldest existing aquarium in Hokkaido, having opened in 1958.

The city also hosts the Tomioka Catholic church, many of whose buildings have been designated as landmark architecture.

Otaru is known for its beer, and Otaru Beer, next to the canal, is a German restaurant with a medieval theme. The city is also known for its fresh sushi. Another food attraction unique to Otaru is rainbow tower ice cream. The town also has substantial shopping arcades and bazaars, but fewer than nearby Sapporo.

Otaru's prominent industries are arts and crafts, such as studio glass and musical boxes. Of the latter, it maintains the Otaru Music Box Museum. Otaru Art Base is another cluster of museums that showcases local art.

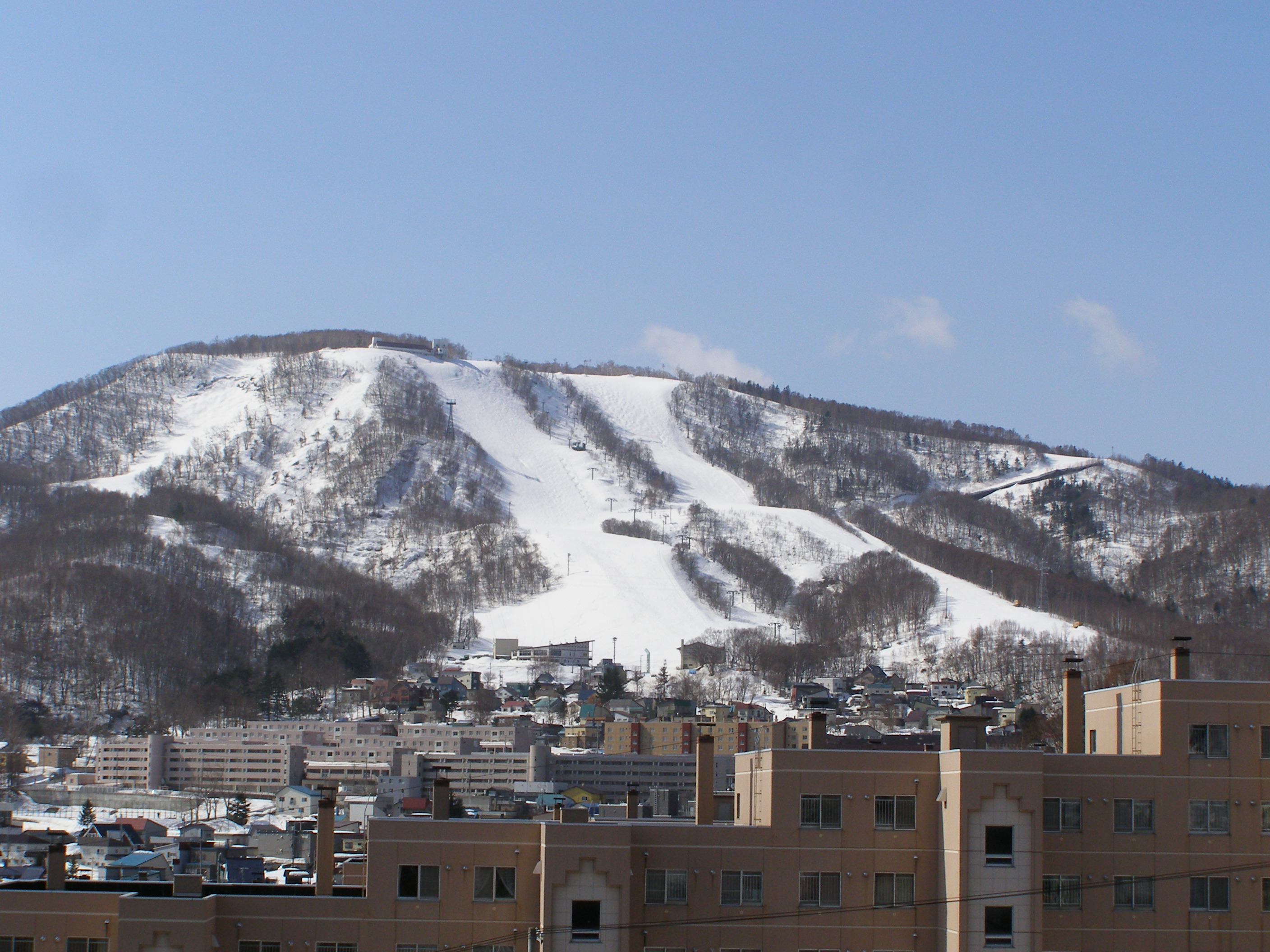
Otaru Tenguyama ski resort

== Tenguyama ==
Otaru is an important port for Sapporo, and part of this hilly city is on the lower slopes of Tenguyama, a good place for skiing and other winter sports and one that is accessible via Otaru Tenguyama Ropeway.

== Regional dishes ==
Otaru Ankake Yakisoba is a regional variety of the popular Ankake Yakisoba dish that is an important part of the local cuisine and is a draw for tourists.

== Sister cities ==
- Nakhodka, Russia
- Dunedin, New Zealand
- Gangseo District, Seoul, South Korea

== Notable people ==
- Seiji Aochi, ski jumper and Olympic medalist (1972 Winter Olympics)
- Yōko Asagami, Japanese voice actress (Space Battleship Yamato and City Hunter)
- Gennosuke Fuse, anatomist of the Meiji period
- Sei Itō, Japanese poet, novelist, and translator
- Chiaki Kawamata, Japanese science fiction writer and critic (Emblem of Roto)
- Yukie Kawamura, Japanese gravure idol, tarento, and actress
- Hinako Kitano, actress and model (ex-Nogizaka46)
- Masaki Kobayashi, Japanese film director (The Human Condition, Harakiri, Samurai Rebellion and Kwaidan)
- Takiji Kobayashi, Japanese author of proletarian literature
- Masaru Konuma, Japanese film director (Roman Porno)
- Natsuhiko Kyogoku, Japanese mystery writer, member of the Mystery Writers of Japan and the Honkaku Mystery Writers Club of Japan
- Motosaburo Masuyama, Japanese statistician
- Hideharu Miyahira, ski jumper
- Nobuko Miyamoto, Japanese actress
- Tetsuya Mizuguchi, video game designer and co-founder of Q Entertainment
- Takiko Mizunoe, Japanese actress, film producer, radio personality and TV presenter
- Maki Murakami, Japanese manga artist (Gravitation)
- Hideo Murota, Japanese actor (Shinde mo ii)
- Nobuo Nakamura, Japanese actor (Ikiru and Tokyo Story)
- Tetsuya Okabe, Alpine ski racer
- Hibiki Ōtsuki, Japanese AV actress and idol singer
- Sarah Midori Perry, musician (Kero Kero Bonito)
- Yoshimasa Sugawara, rally driver
- Yoko Takahashi, Japanese female mixed martial arts fighter, kickboxer and former boxer and professional wrestler
- Kōtetsuyama Toyoya, sumo wrestler (Real Name: Kōnoshin Suga, Nihongo: 菅 孝之進, Suga Kōnoshin)
- Miyoshi Umeki, Academy Award-winning Japanese actress and standards singer
- Hirokazu Yagi, ski jumper
- Akiko Yamanaka, Japanese politician
- Ichiro Yamaguchi, musician (Sakanaction)
- Sawao Yamanaka, musician (The Pillows)
- Kazumi Yamashita, manga artist (The Life of Genius Professor Yanagizawa)
- Hideki Naganuma, musician and DJ

== See also ==
- Otaru Station
- Otaru University of Commerce
- Rising Sun Rock Festival
