= Otaru Junior College =

Former school in Hokkaido, Japan

Coordinates: 43.1818°N 140.9956°E

- 小樽短期大学
- Type: private
- Active: 1967–2008
- Location: Otaru, Hokkaidō, Japan
- Website: www.otaru-jc.ac.jp

Otaru Junior College (小樽短期大学, Otaru Tanki Daigakubu) was a private junior college in Otaru, Hokkaidō, Japan. It was established in 1967 for women, became coeducational in 1999, and closed in 2008.

== See also ==
- List of junior colleges in Japan
