= Otaru Art Base =

Group of art museums in Hokkaido, Japan

- 小樽芸術村
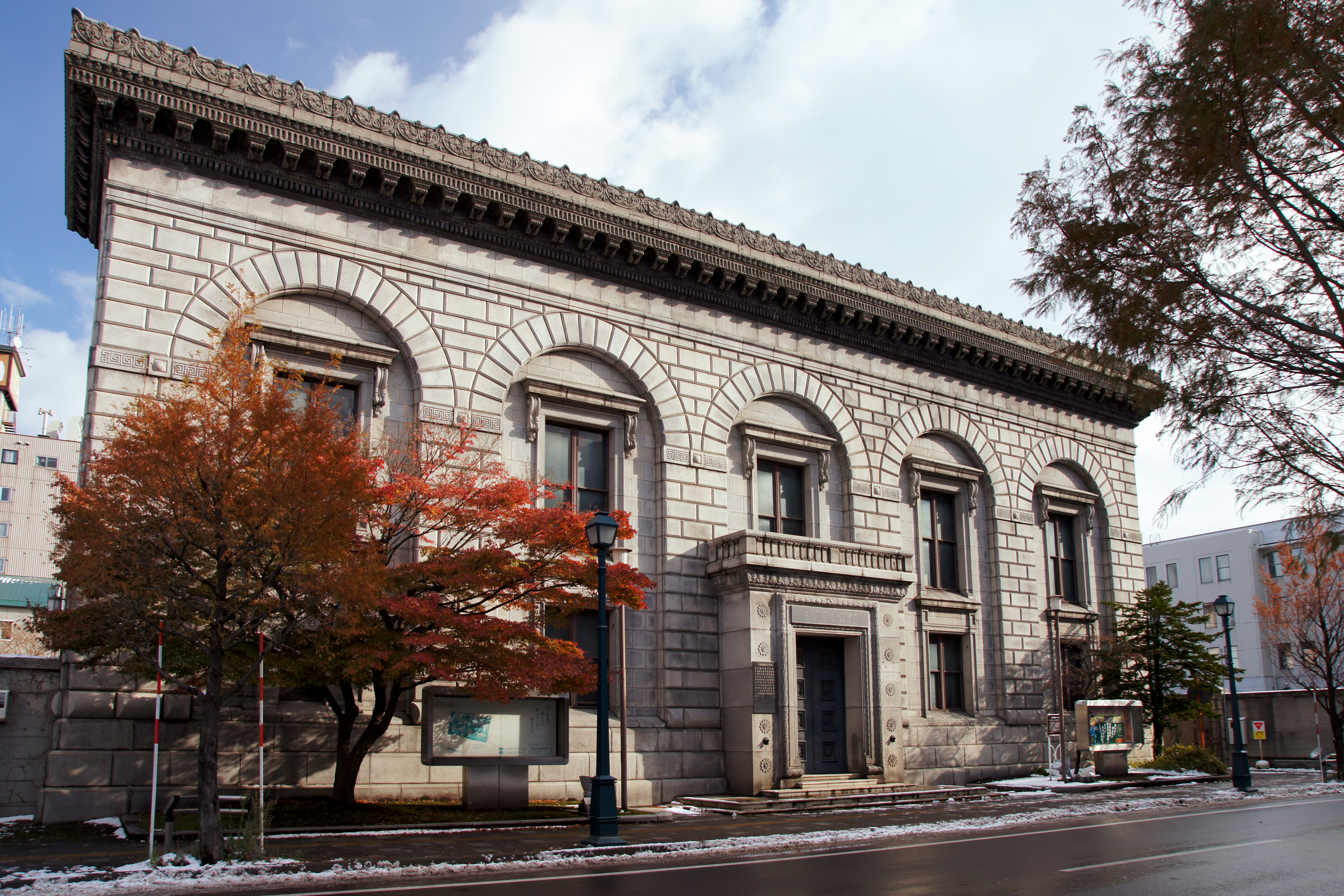
- Former Mitsui Bank Otaru Branch (ICP)
- Established: 23 July 2016
- Location: Ironai 1-chōme 3-1 Otaru, Hokkaido, Japan
- Coordinates: 43°11′52″N 141°00′07″E
- Website: Official website

Otaru Art Base (小樽芸術村, Otaru Geijutsu Mura) is a cluster of five historic buildings repurposed to serve as art museums in Otaru, Hokkaido, Japan. Established in 2016 and managed by The Nitori Culture Foundation, the complex comprises the Stained Glass Museum (in the Former Takahashi Warehouse (1923) and Former Arata Trading Company building (1935)), the Former Mitsui Bank Otaru Branch (1927), the Nitori Museum of Art (in the Former Hokkaido Takushoku Bank Otaru Branch (1923)), and the House of Western Art (the Former Naniwa Warehouse (1925)). The collection includes stained glass windows by Louis Comfort Tiffany and paintings by Tani Bunchō, Kuroda Seiki, Okada Saburōsuke, and Murakami Kagaku.

== See also ==
- Otaru City General Museum
- Nitori Culture Hall
