= Otaru Aquarium =

Otaru Aquarium おたる水族館
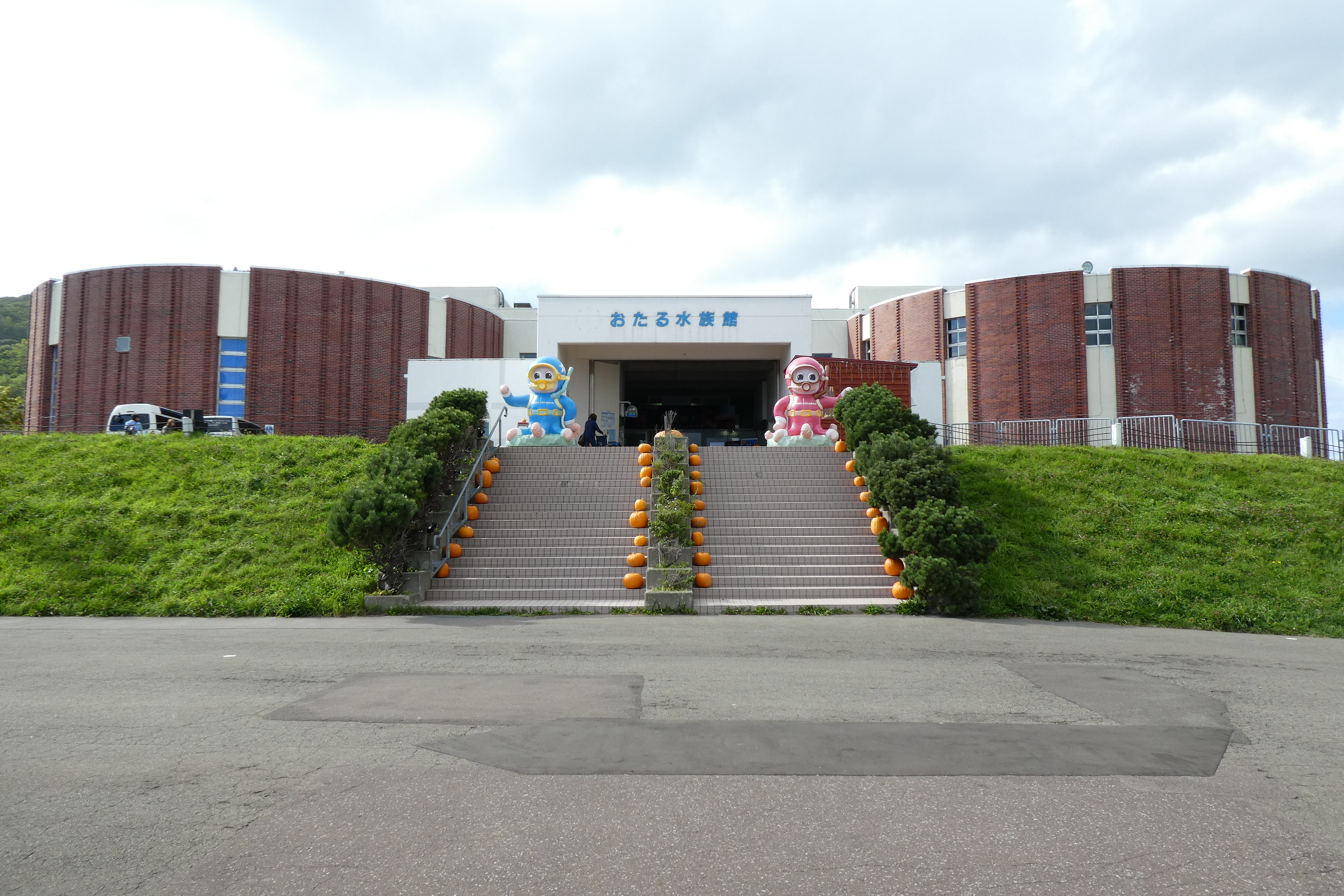
- Otaru Aquarium
- Interactive map of Otaru Aquarium おたる水族館
- 36.7985°N 137.3881°E
- Date opened: July 1958
- Location: Otaru, Hokkaido, Japan
- Land area: 107,000 m^{2} (1,150,000 sq ft) (Total area including attached amusement park)
- No. of animals: 5,000
- No. of species: 260
- Total volume of tanks: 3,500,000 litres (925,000 US gal) (except for the seal and fur seal tanks connected to the sea)
- Annual visitors: 350,000(2006)
- Memberships: JAZA
- Major exhibits: Harbor porpoise etc.
- Website: otaru-aq.jp

Otaru Aquarium (おたる水族館, Otaru-suizokukan) is a public aquarium operated by Otaru Public Aquarium Corporation, Third Sector, in Otaru City, Hokkaido, Japan. It is one of the largest aquariums in Hokkaido, and It is a member of the Japanese Association of Zoos and Aquariums (JAZA). The aquarium is accredited as a Museum-equivalent facilities by the Museum Act from Ministry of Education, Culture, Sports, Science and Technology.

== History ==
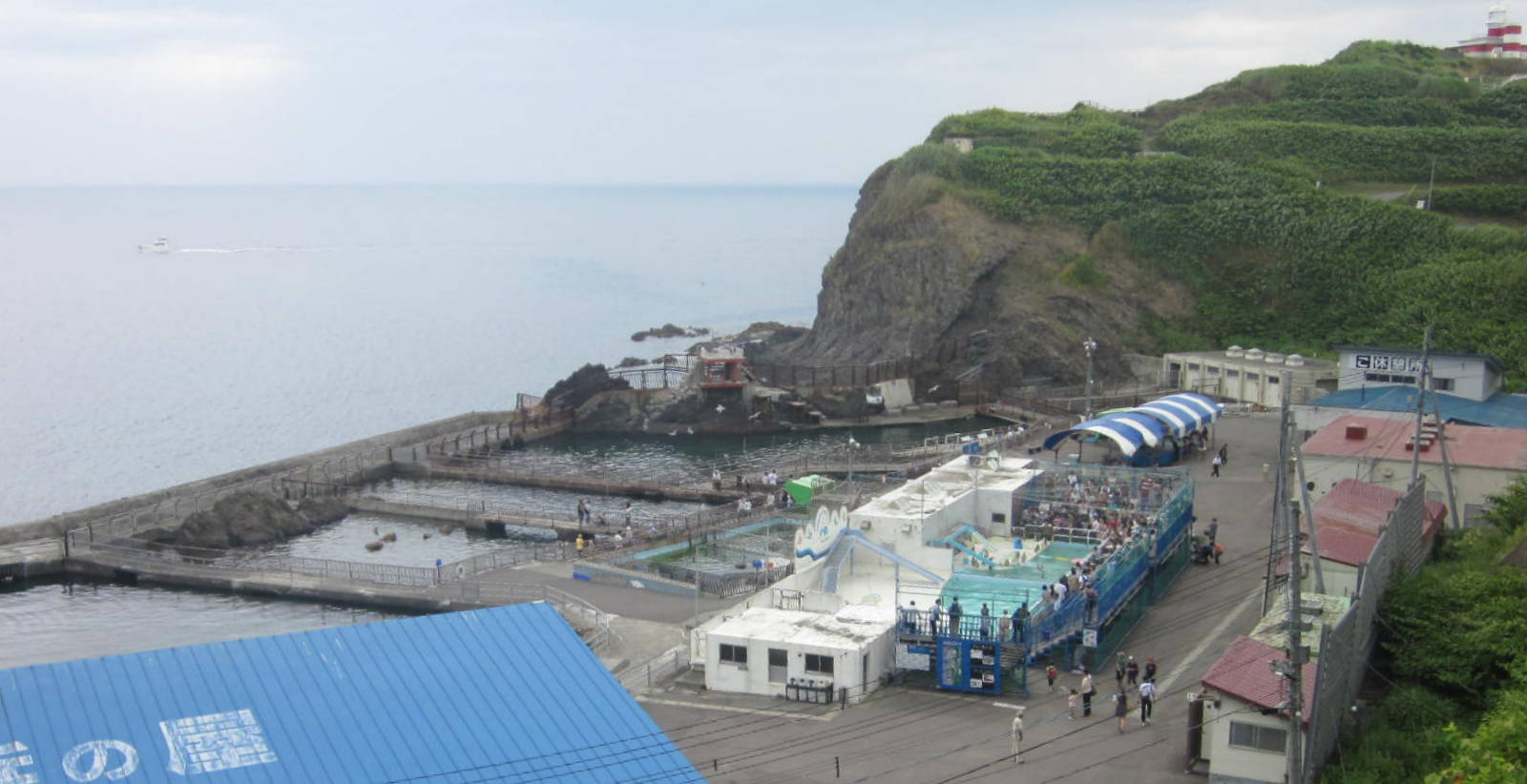
Marine mammal park

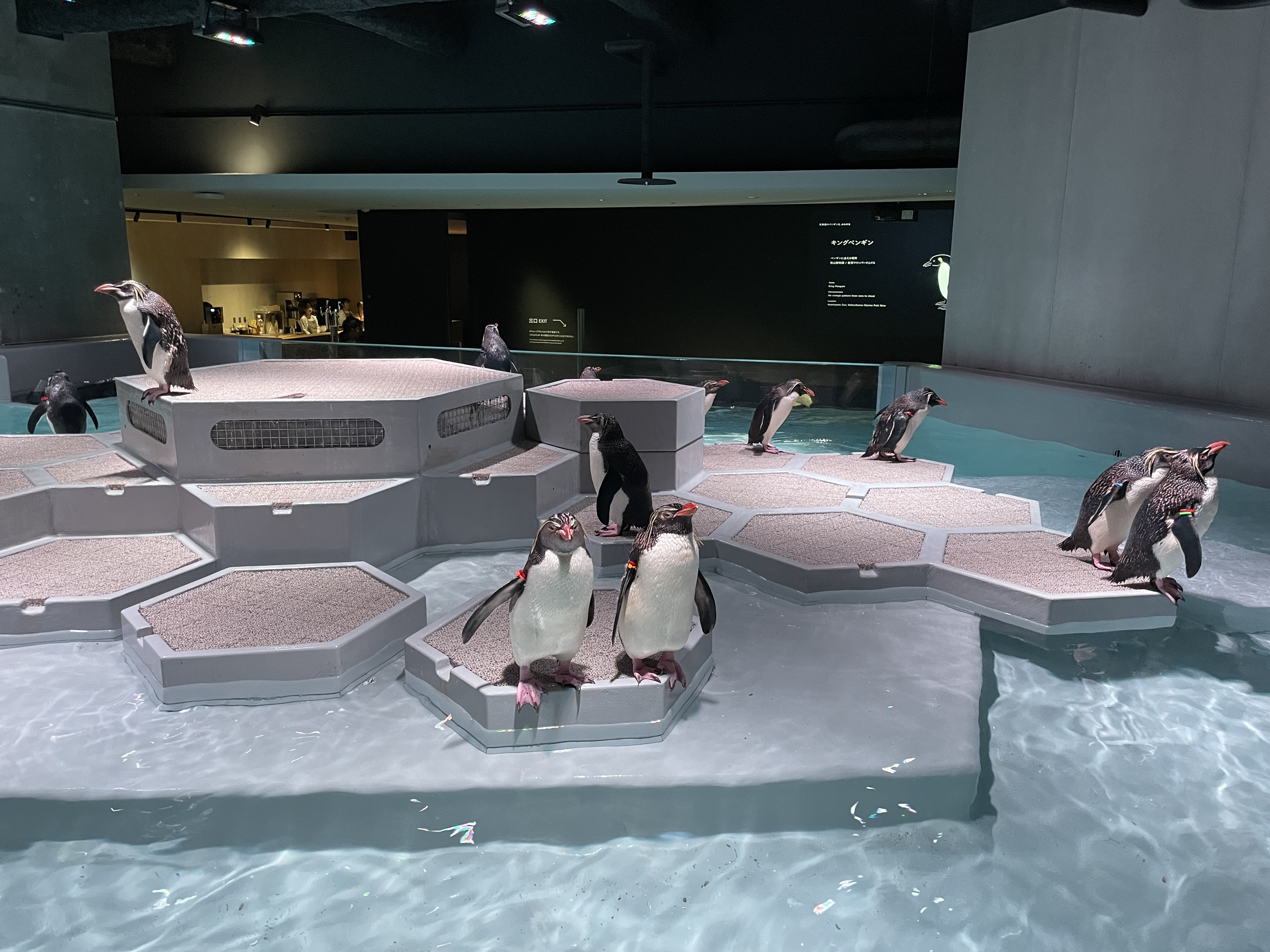
AOAO SAPPORO

Built in July 1958 as a "marine venue" for the Hokkaido Grand Exposition, the aquarium began operations in 1959 as the Otaru Municipal Aquarium, and with the completion of the new building (now the main building) in 1974, it was managed by the Otaru Aquarium Public Corporation, a third-sector corporation.

The aquarium consists of the main building, which exhibits a wide variety of fish and shellfish, the Dolphin Stadium, which features dolphin and sea lion shows, the Marine Park, where seals, walruses, sea lions, penguins, and other animals are kept, and the amusement park, Otaru Shukuzu Marine Land. The marine animal park is located in a natural cove, where seabirds also fly in. Wild sea lions and largha seals sometimes stray into the park from the coast and are kept there.

The aquarium is usually open from spring break in March (previously April) to November, but has been open in winter since 2006 in conjunction with the Otaru Snow Light Path and the Sapporo Snow Festival.

In 2023, Otaru Aquarium was entrusted with the breeding and operation of AOAO SAPPORO, an aquarium that opened on the fourth to sixth floors of the Moyuk SAPPORO tower building in Chuo-ku, Sapporo.

=== Timeline ===
- 1958 - Completed as the "Aquarium" at the Shukutsu site of the Otaru site of the Hokkaido Grand Exposition Sea.
- 1959 - Inaugurated as the Otaru Municipal Aquarium.
- 1973 - Construction of a new aquarium begins on higher ground approximately 200 meters from the original.
- 1974.
  - July 12 - Closing of the original Otaru Municipal Aquarium.
  - July 14, 1974 - The current aquarium opens. The aquarium is expanded to four times its original size, with 45 tanks on three floors above ground and one basement floor, and its management is transferred to the public corporation.
- 1981 - The sea lion pool is completed.
- 1983 - Dolphin Stadium is completed.
- 1992 - Completion of the Walrus Pavilion.
- 2011 - The park will be open all year round.
- 2023 - The management of AOAO SAPPORO, an urban public aquarium in Sapporo, is commissioned.

== Research and conservation ==
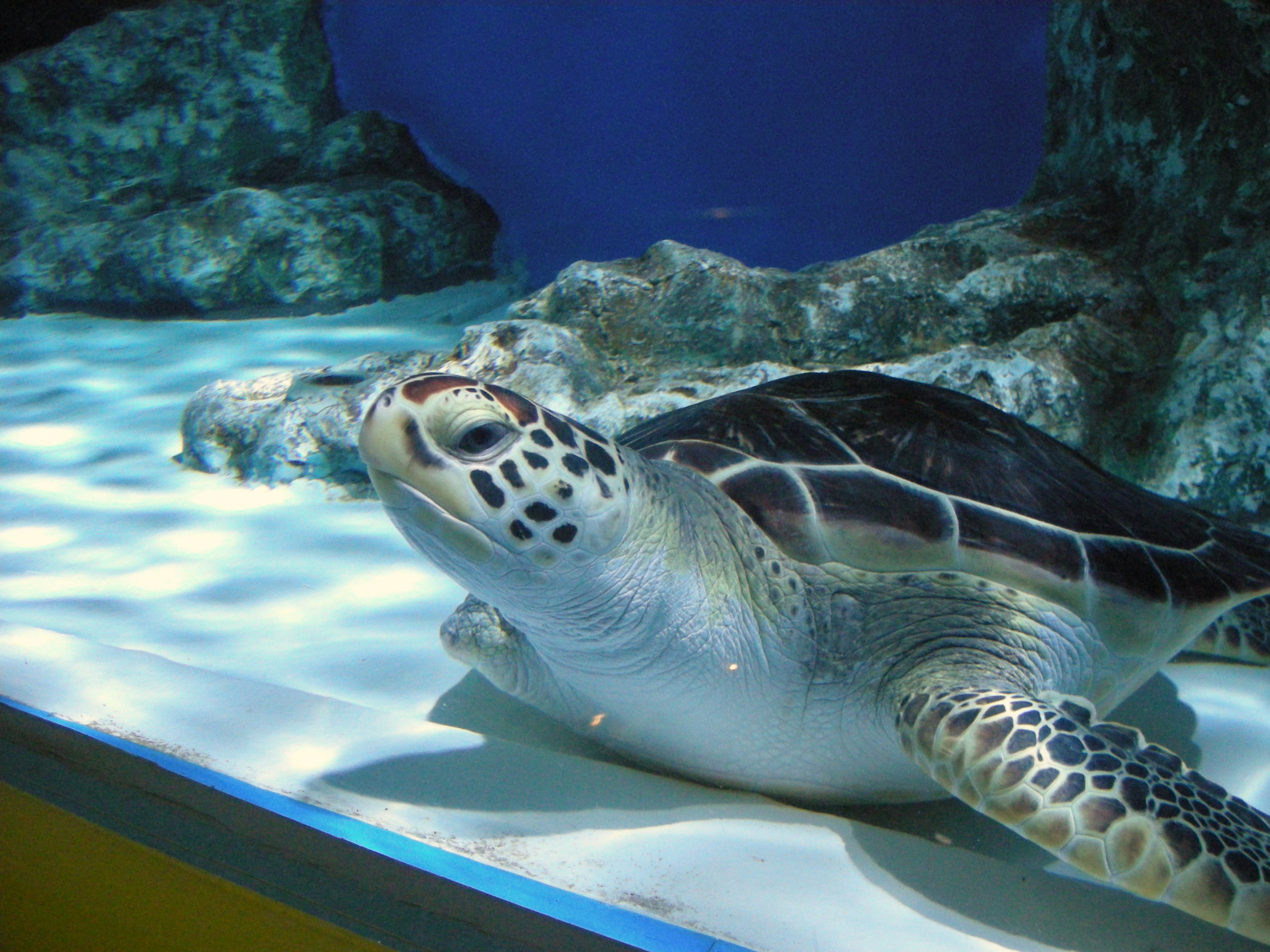
The one-armed sea turtle is named Taro

The Otaru Aquarium has been actively conducting research activities and has produced research results in the cases of Harbour porpoise and Bearded seal births and artificial nursing.

Jirokichi, a male Harbour porpoise that survived until 2008, holds the record for the world's longest breeding record at 24 years. Jirokichi was protected in 1984 when he was caught in a fixed net off the coast of Sutsu Town in the Goshi region. According to Makoto Oda, the director of the aquarium at the time, she was a juvenile dolphin with no teeth at the time of her protection [She lived at the aquarium until March 25, 2008, although she had lost most of her sight due to her advanced age. She was about 165 cm long and estimated to be 24 years old.

In 2007, a green turtle without a right front fin was protected on the beach in Hatsuyamabetsu Village and has been kept in captivity to this day.

== Gallery ==
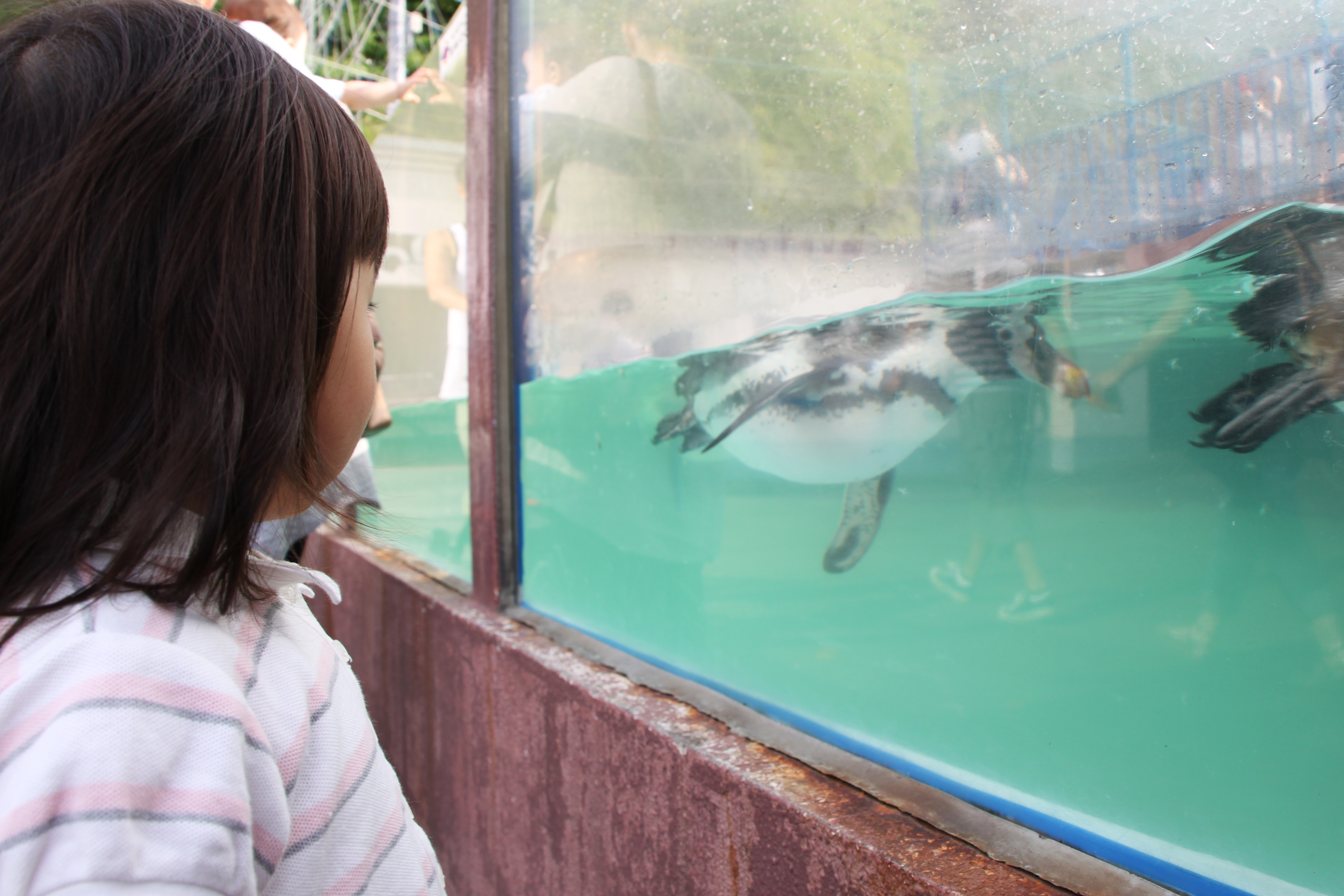

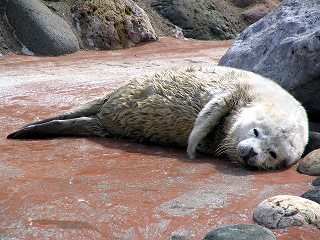

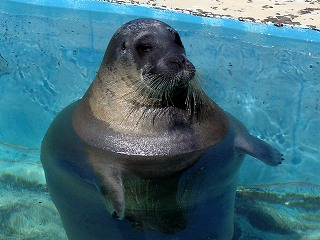

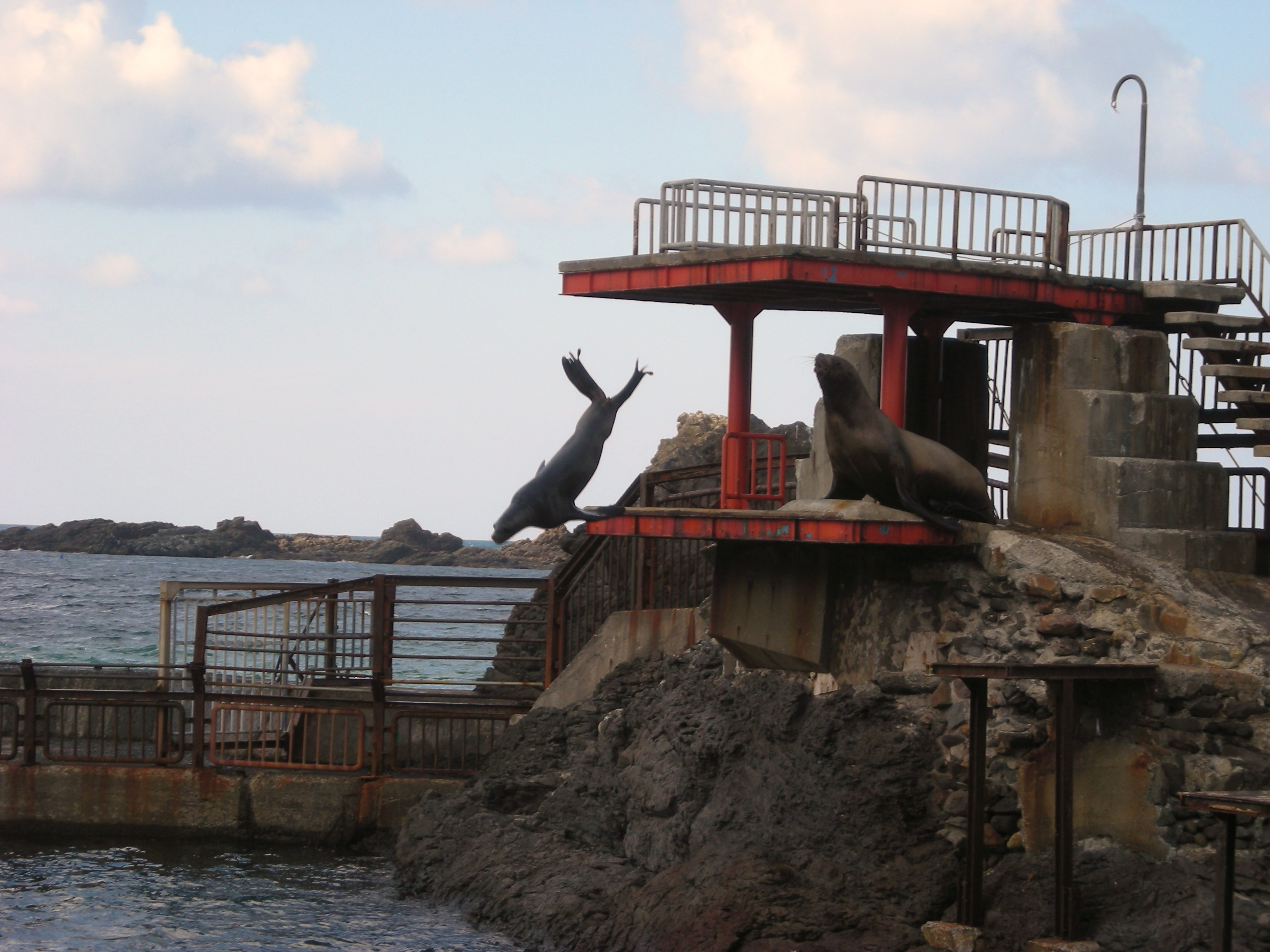

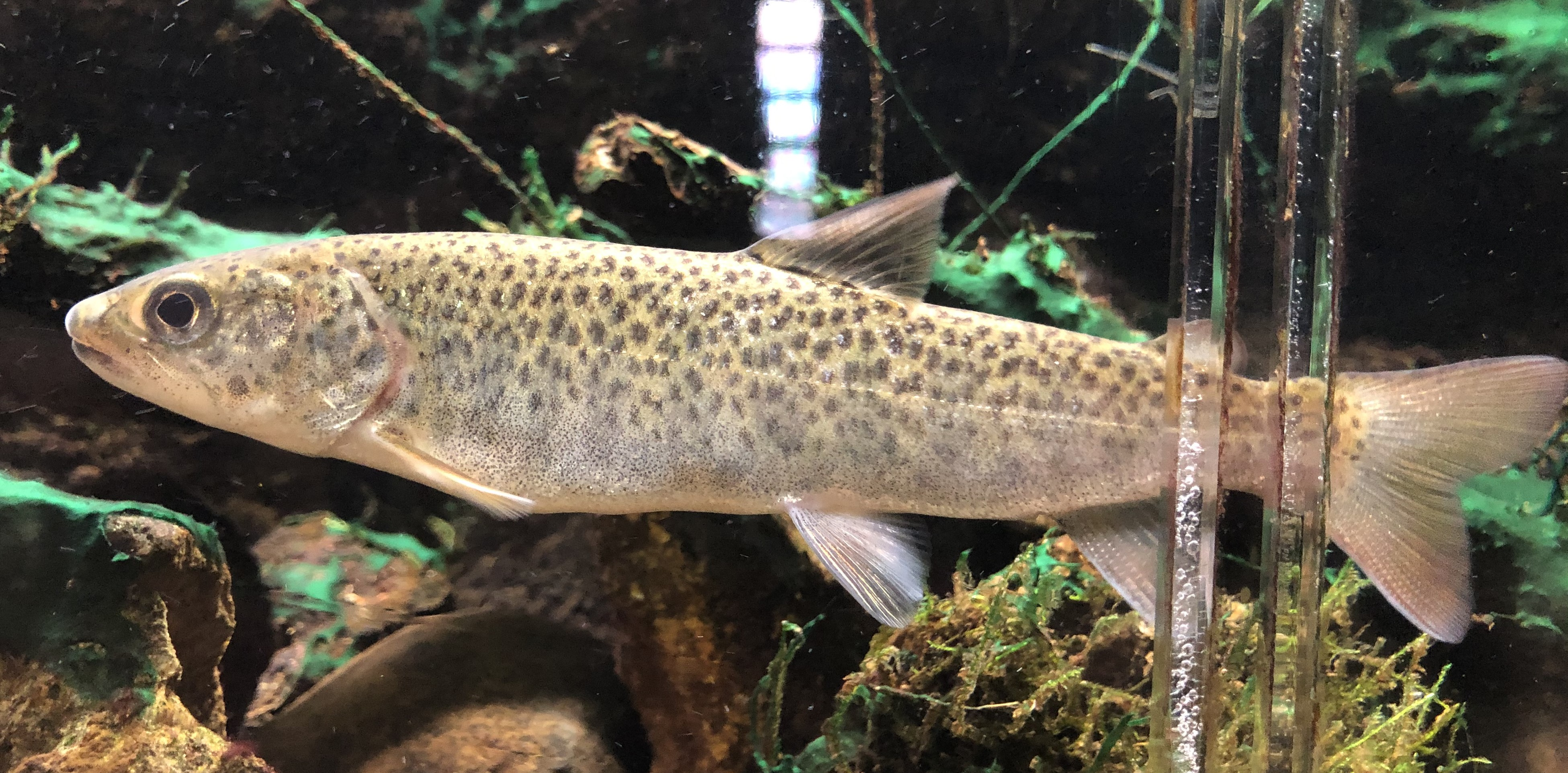

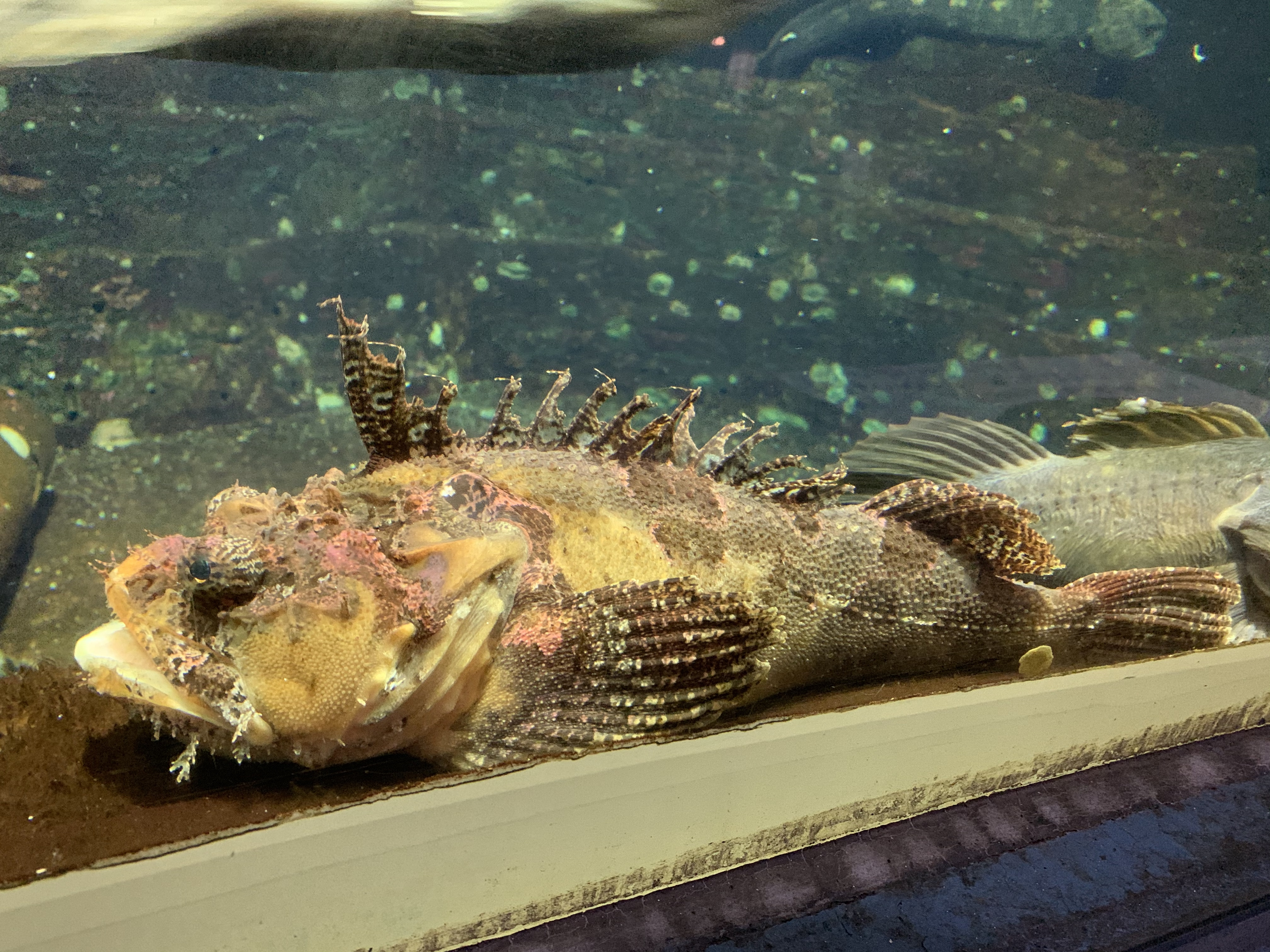

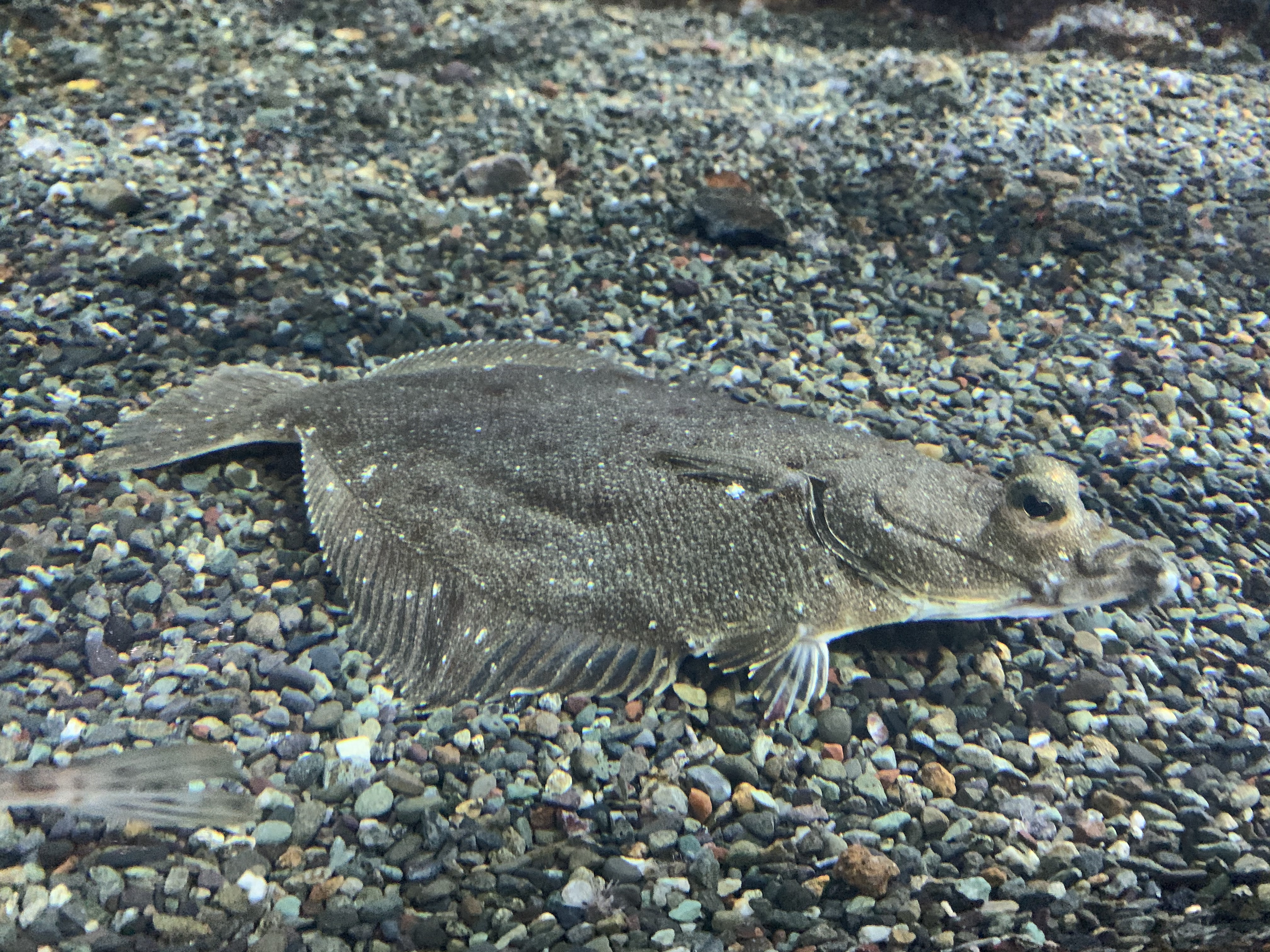

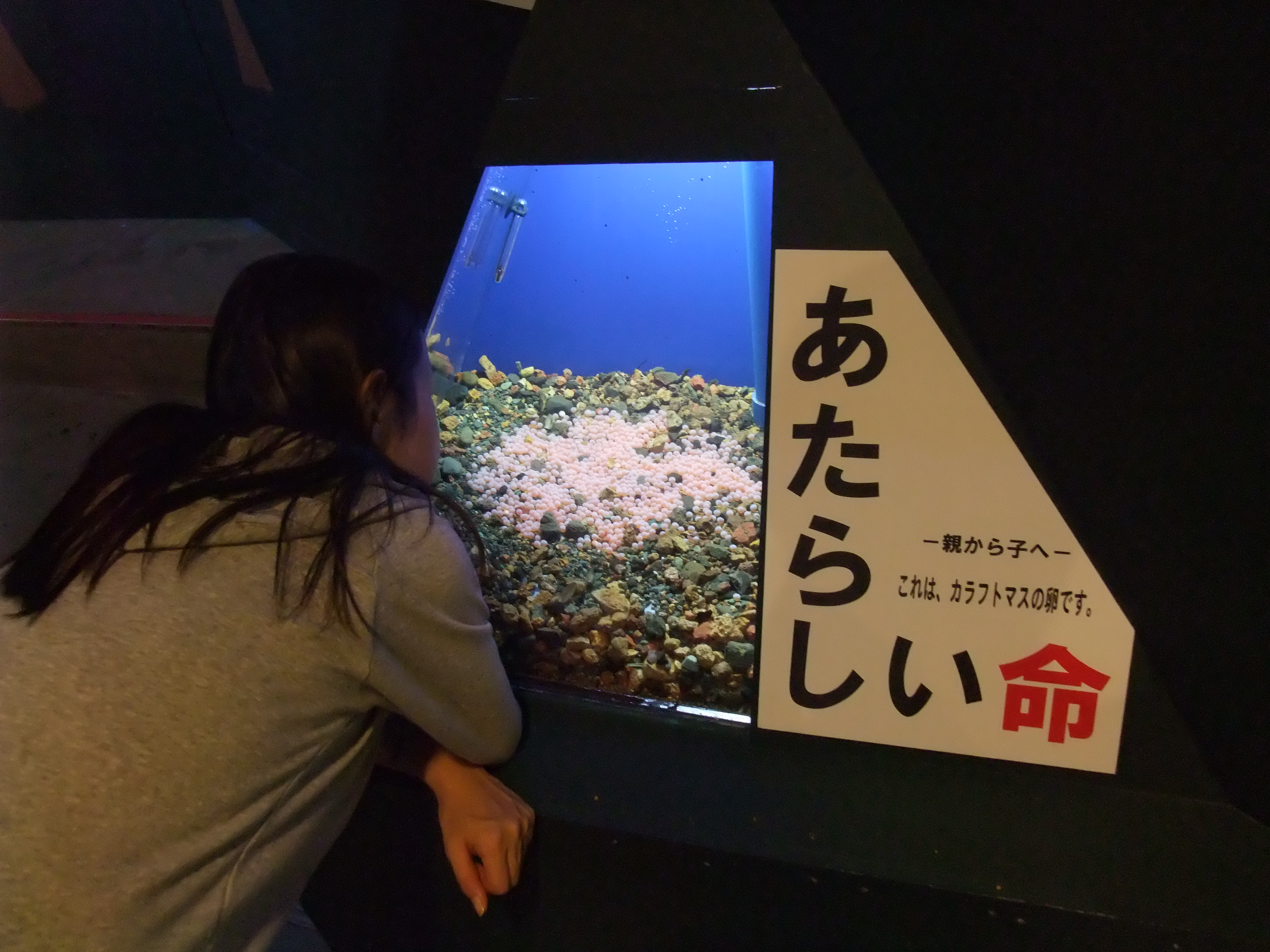
