= Hokkaido Otaru Fisheries High School =

High school in Otaru, Japan

Coordinates: 43.1788°N 141.0244°E

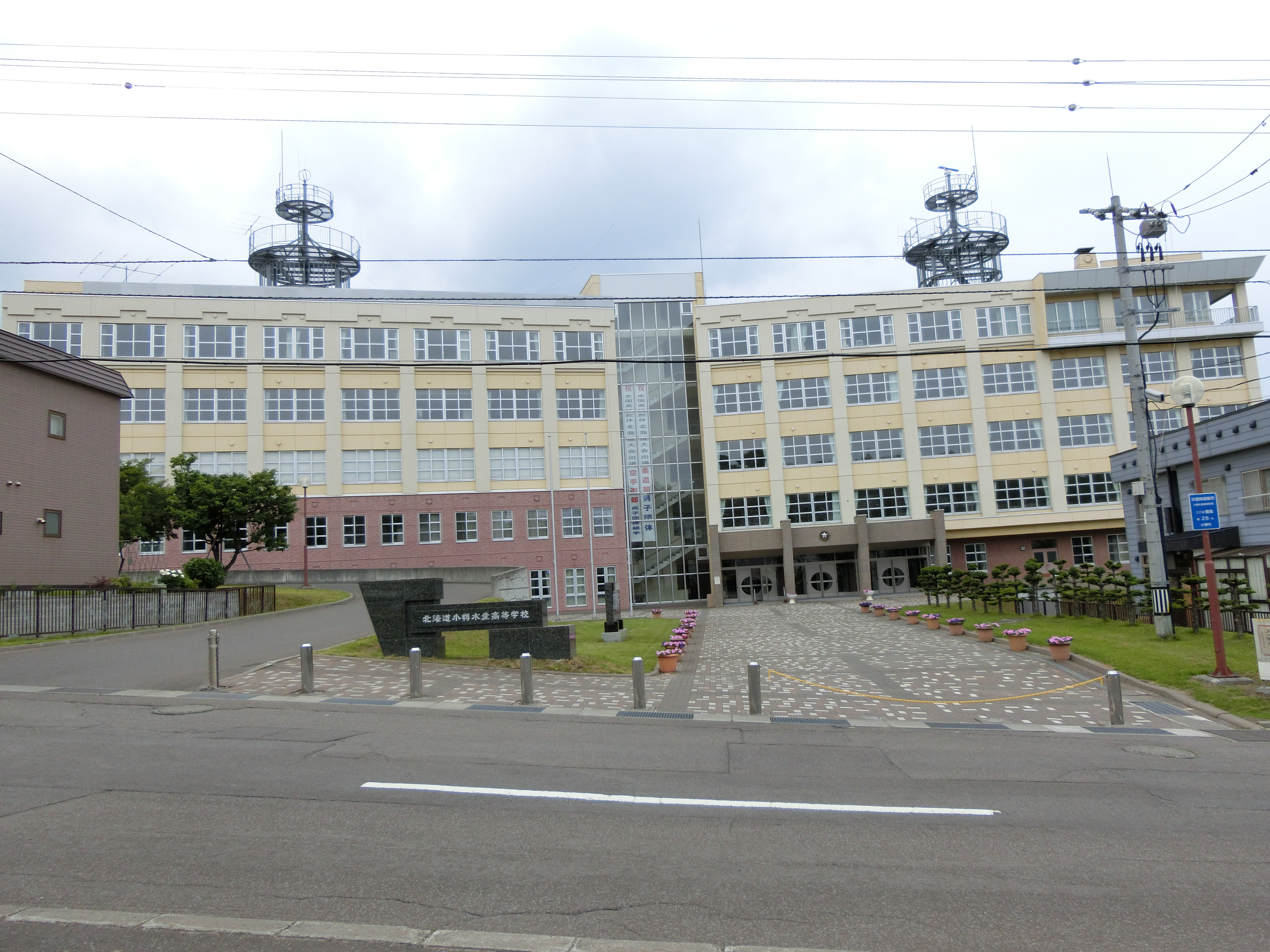
Hokkaido Otaru Fisheries High School

Hokkaido Otaru Fisheries High School (北海道小樽水産高等学校, Hokkaidō Otaru Suisan Kōtōgakkō) is a public high school in Otaru, Hokkaido.

It was first created in 1905 as the Hokkaido Fisheries School.

As of 2002, the Hokkaido Education Agency (北海道教育庁) owns the training boats that the students use: Hokuo-maru (北凰丸) and Wakatake-maru (若竹丸).

The students, along with Kokubu Hokkaido (国分北海道), developed a canned product called "Hokkaido Hokke" (道産ホッケ).
