= Gennosuke Fuse =

Japanese anatomist

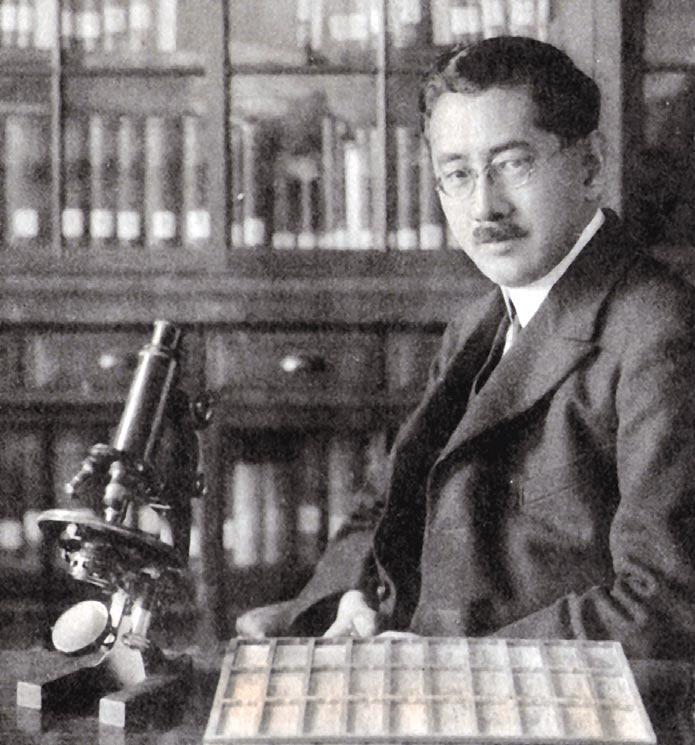
Gennosuke Fuse in 1921

Gennosuke Fuse (布施 現之助, Fuse Gennosuke; January 24, 1880 in Otaru, Hokkaidō - December 12, 1946) was a Japanese anatomist of the Meiji period.

He graduated from Tokyo Imperial University medical school. Then he studied abroad in Switzerland. He was assistant of the University of Zurich from 1907 to 1911 and from 1914 to 1916 and worked with Constantin von Monakow.

His name is lent to the Kölliker-Fuse nucleus.

== Bibliography ==
- Fischer I: Biographisches Lexikon der hervorragenden Ärzte der letzten fünfzig Jahre. Band 1. München-Berlin: Urban & Schwarzenberg, 1962, p. 468
- Satake, Y (February 1956). "Gennosuke Fuse; in memoriam". Tohoku J. Exp. Med. 63: 103–8. PMID 13337853..
- Tomoyuki Ogawa. GENNOSUKE FUSE - A Great Master of Anatomy, Omnividens No. 22, pp. 6–8, 2007 PDF
