= Otaru Music Box Museum =

Museum in Hokkaido, Japan

- 小樽オルゴール堂
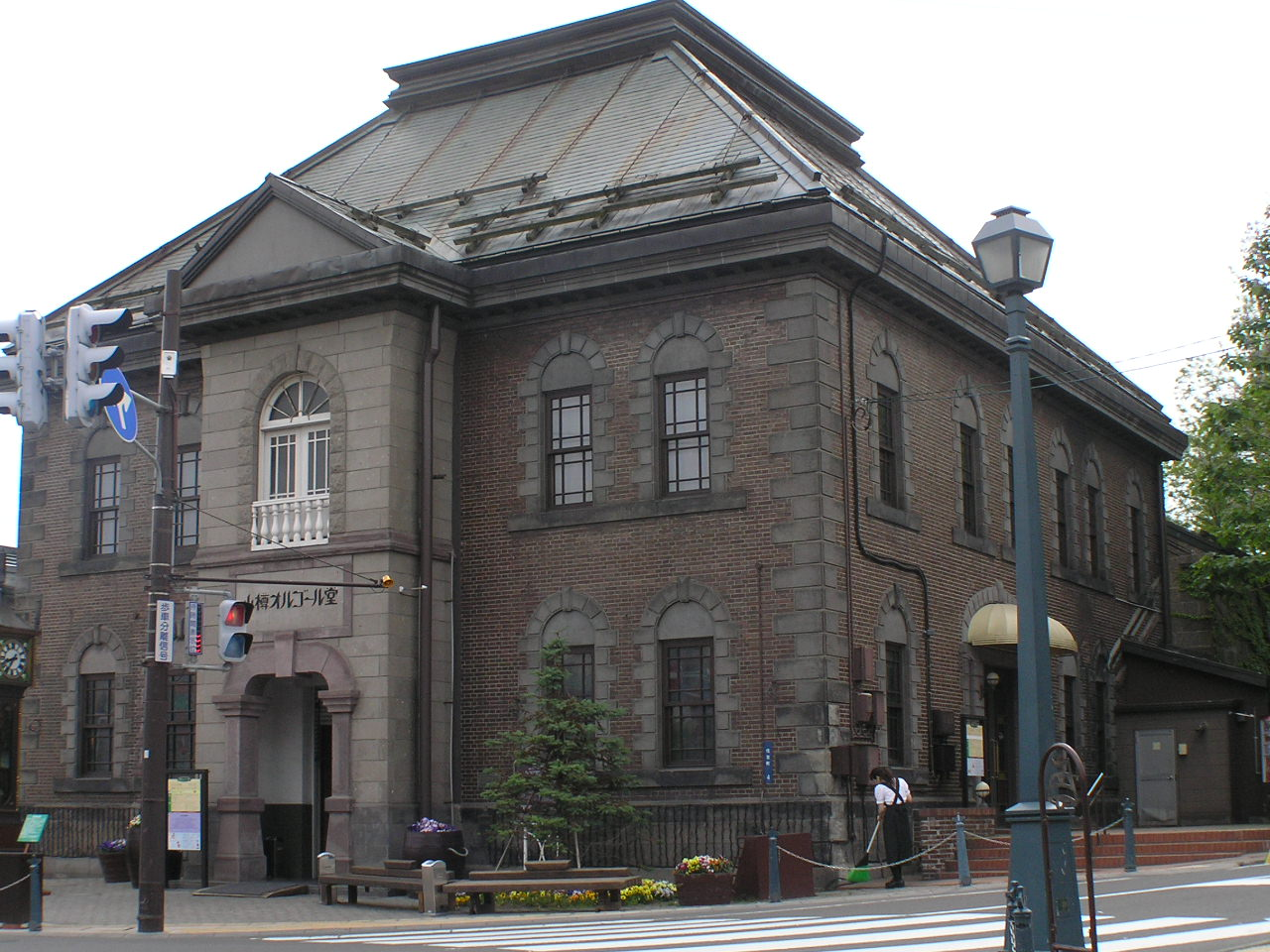

- Location within Japan
- Established: 1967
- Location: Otaru
- Coordinates: 43°11′26.167″N 141°0′27.973″E
- Type: music instruments museum
- Website: www.otaru-orgel.co.jp/english/e_index.html

Otaru Music Box Museum (小樽オルゴール堂) is a music museum in the Otaru Orgel-do II building in Otaru, Japan. It includes various examples of music boxes as well as CDs that have music box-esque versions of various songs. Chris Bamforth of The Japan Times wrote that it had an "absolutely phenomenal" variety of music.

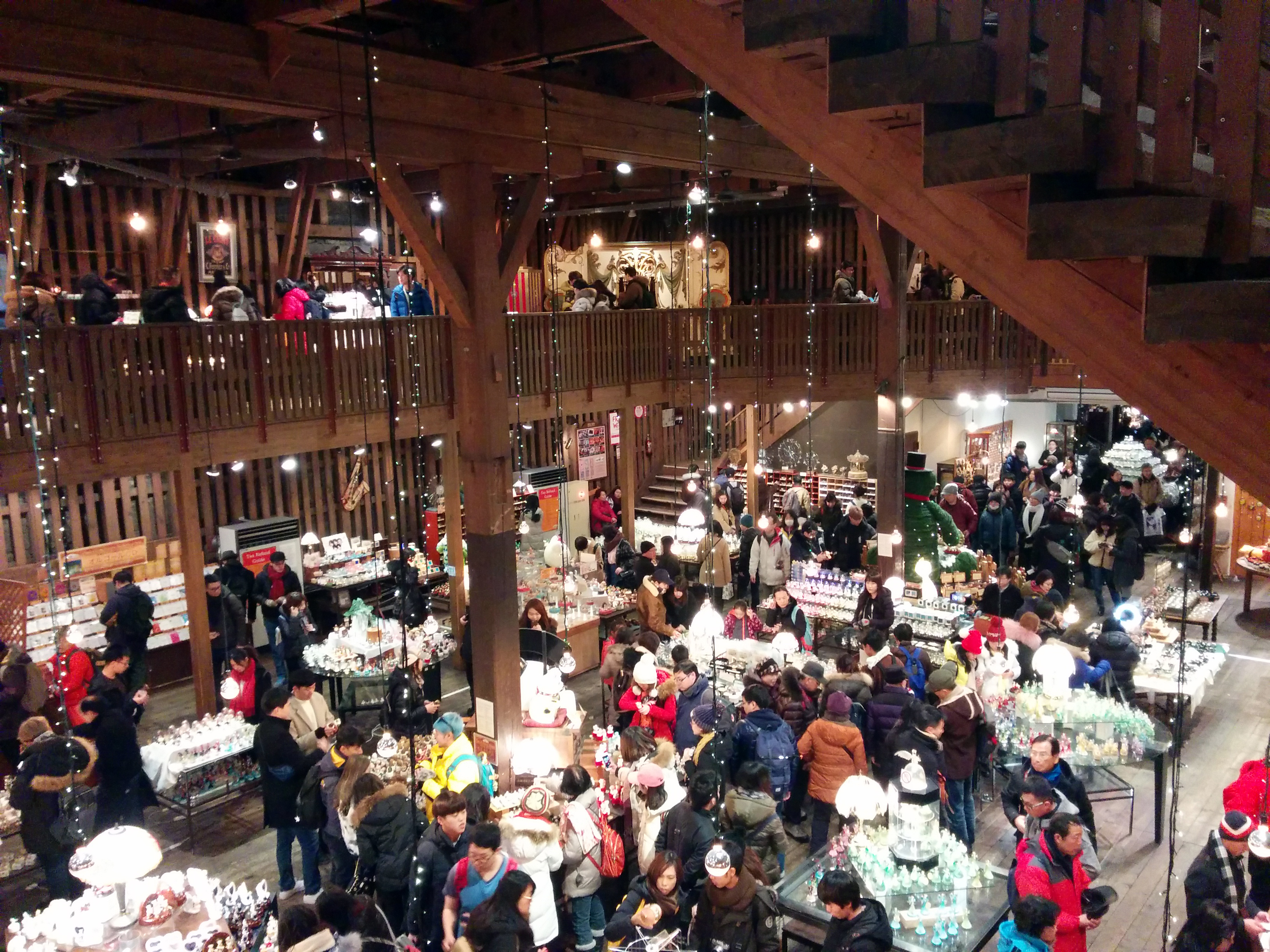
Interior of the museum showing the shop.

The main building of the museum was constructed in 1902. The antique music boxes are in Hall 2.

There are about 25,000 music boxes in the collection.

== See also ==
- List of music museums
