= Sei Itō =

Japanese writer

- 伊藤 整
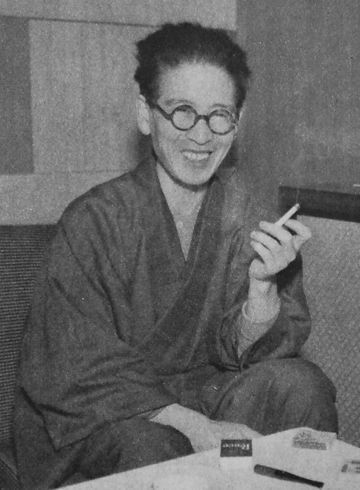
- Sei Itō in 1954
- Born: Hitoshi Itō; 16 January 1905; Matsumae, Hokkaidō, Japan
- Died: 15 November 1969 (aged 64); Tokyo, Japan
- Resting place: Kodaira Cemetery, Tokyo, Japan
- Occupations: Writer, translator
- Writing career
- Pen name: Sei Itō
- Movement: Modernism

Sei Itō (伊藤 整, Itō Sei; 16 January 1905 – 15 November 1969), born Hitoshi Itō (伊藤 整, Itō Hitoshi), was a Japanese Modernist writer of poetry, prose and essays, and a translator.

== Life ==
Sei Itō was born in Matsumae, Hokkaidō, under the name of Hitoshi Itō. After graduating from Otaru Higher Commercial School (now Otaru University of Commerce), he moved to Tokyo and entered the Tokyo College of Commerce (now Hitotsubashi University), which he left without a graduate. In 1926, he debuted with the poetry collection Yukiakari no michi (lit. "Snow-lit road"). Together with writers like Junzaburō Nishiwaki, Riichi Yokomitsu and Tomoji Abe, Itō became an exponent of writers who introduced European Modernist literature into Japan in the literary journal Shi to shiron ("Poetry and poetic theory"), and kept aiming at what he termed "modernism" in his own writing throughout his life.

Starting in 1931, he provided (together with Sadamu Masamatsu and Hisanori Tsuji) the first complete translation of James Joyce's Ulysses into Japanese in the 1930s. Itō's 1937 novel Streets of Fiendish Ghosts (Yūki no machi) showed the influence of Joyce's stream of consciousness technique, and his style became known as "Shin shinri shugi" ("School of new psychology"). In 1950, he caused controversy for his complete translation of D. H. Lawrence's Lady Chatterley's Lover, which became the case of an obscenity trial. He was awarded the Kikuchi Kan Prize in 1963 for his Nihon kindai bungaku taikei ("History of Japanese literary circles") and the Japan Art Academy Prize in 1969.

== Selected works ==
- 1926: Yukiakari no michi (poetry collection)
- 1931: A Department Store Called M (M Hyakkaten, short story)
- 1937: Streets of Fiendish Ghosts (Yūki no machi, novel)
- 1940–41: Tokuno Goro no seikatsu to iken (novel)
- 1946–48: Senkichi Narumi (novel)
- 1948: Shōsetsu no hōhō (essay collection)
- 1955–1969: Nihon kindai bungaku taikei

== English translations ==
- Itō, Sei (2005). "A Department Store Called M". In Rimer, Thomas J.; Gessel, Van C. (eds.). The Columbia Anthology of Modern Japanese Literature: From Restoration to Occupation, 1868-1945. Translated by Angles, Jeffrey. New York: Columbia University Press.
- Itō, Sei (2008). "Streets of Fiendish Ghosts". In Tyler, William J. (ed.). Modanizumu: Modernist Fiction from Japan, 1913–1938. Translated by Tyler, William J. Honolulu: University of Hawai'i Press.

== Legacy ==
The Itō Sei Prize for Literature (Itō Sei bungaku shō) was established in his memory in 1990. Notable recipients include Kenzaburō Ōe and Yūko Tsushima.
