= Otaru University of Commerce =

National university in Japan

Coordinates: 43°11′27.95″N 140°58′47.37″E

- 小樽商科大学
- The logo of Otaru University of Commerce
- Former names: Otaru School of Higher Learning
- Type: National
- Established: 1910
- President: Makoto ANAZAWA
- Students: 2,425 (as of 2013)
- Location: Otaru, Hokkaido, Japan
- Campus: Otaru (main) Sapporo (satellite)
- Website: www.otaru-uc.ac.jp

Otaru University of Commerce (小樽商科大学, Otaru Shōka Daigaku) is a national university in Japan. The main campus of the university is in Otaru, Hokkaido, with a satellite campus in Chūō-ku, Sapporo.

== Overview ==
The university is often called "Taru-shō" or "Shō-dai". The graduate university has an MBA program, the "Major in Entrepreneurship" course.

The symbol of the university was designated on October 1, 1998. The logo imprints the year of the establishment, the name of the university (OUC), and the symbol of two wings of Hermes, who is the Olympian god of commerce.

== Faculties ==
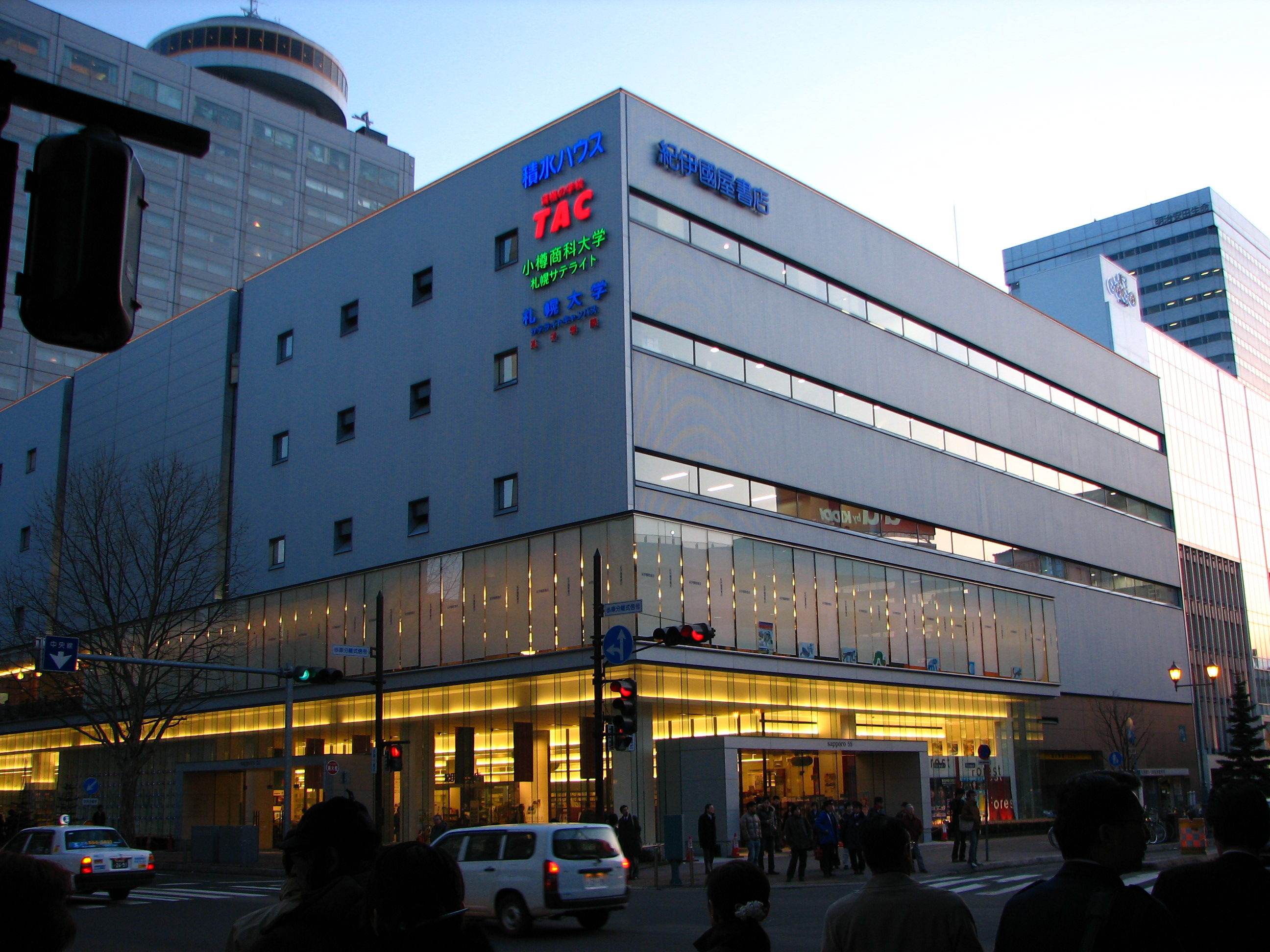
Satellite Campus of Otaru University of Commerce

=== Faculty of Commerce ===
- Department of Economics
- Department of Commerce
- Department of Law
- Department of Information and Management Science
- Teachers' Training Program in Commerce

=== Graduate School of Commerce ===
- Major in Modern Commerce (Master and Doctor Program)
- Major in Entrepreneurship (Professional Degree (MBA) Program)

== History ==
The university was established in 1910 as the Otaru Higher Commercial School, becoming the fifth national school of commerce in Japan. In 1944, during World War II, the school was renamed Otaru College of Economics. In 1949, the Otaru University of Commerce was officially established, with a Faculty of Commerce. The university became a junior college and a Graduate School of Commerce.

In 1991, the system of the university was reorganized, establishing four departments in the Faculty of Commerce: the Department of Economics, Department of Commerce, Department of Law, and Department of Information and Management Science.

The Otaru University of Commerce's Junior College was abolished in 1996. After the establishment of a satellite campus in Chuo-ku, Sapporo, the university opened a major in Business Administration in the graduate school in 1997. In 2005, the satellite campus was moved its current location in Kita-ku, Sapporo.

== Evaluation from business world ==
The university ranking of the ratio of "president and chief executive officer of listed company"
	Ranking
All universities in Japan	5th out of all the 744 universities which existed as of 2006
Source	2006 Survey by Weekly Diamond 〈ja〉 on the ranking of the universities which produced the high ratio of the graduates who hold the position of "president and chief executive officer of listed company" to all the graduates of each university

The ranking of universities according to the numerousness of the number of the officers & managers produced by each university in consideration of the number of graduates
	Ranking
All universities in Japan	2nd out of all the 778 universities which existed as of 2010
Source	2010 Survey by Weekly Economist 〈ja〉 on the ranking of universities according to the numerousness of the number of the officers & managers produced by each university in consideration of the number of graduates
