= Scandal (1989 film) =

1989 film by Michael Caton-Jones

- Theatrical release poster
- Directed by: Michael Caton-Jones
- Written by: Michael Thomas
- Produced by: Stephen Woolley
- Starring: John Hurt; Joanne Whalley-Kilmer; Ian McKellen; Bridget Fonda; Britt Ekland; Roland Gift; Jeroen Krabbé
- Cinematography: Mike Molloy
- Edited by: Angus Newton
- Music by: Carl Davis
- Production company: British Screen Productions
- Distributed by: Palace Pictures
- Release date: 3 March 1989
- Running time: 115 minutes (UK); 106 minutes (US); 111 minutes (Canada)
- Country: United Kingdom
- Language: English
- Budget: $7 million
- Box office: £3,705,065 (UK) $8,800,000 (US)

Scandal is a 1989 British historical drama film, directed by Michael Caton-Jones. It is a fictionalised account of the Profumo affair that rocked the government of British prime minister Harold Macmillan. It stars Joanne Whalley as Christine Keeler and John Hurt as Stephen Ward, personalities at the heart of the affair.

Scandal was screened in competition at the 1989 Cannes Film Festival. Its theme song "Nothing Has Been Proved" was written and produced by Pet Shop Boys and sung by Dusty Springfield.

== Plot ==
An English bon-vivant osteopath is enchanted with a young exotic dancer and invites her to live with him. He serves as friend and mentor, and through his wide range of contacts and his parties she and her friend meet and date members of the Conservative Party. A scandal develops when her affair with the Minister of War comes to public attention.

== Cast ==
- John Hurt as Stephen Ward
- Joanne Whalley as Christine Keeler
- Bridget Fonda as Mandy Rice-Davies
- Ian McKellen as John Profumo
- Leslie Phillips as Lord Astor
- Britt Ekland as Mariella Novotny
- Daniel Massey as Mervyn Griffith-Jones
- Roland Gift as Johnny Edgecombe
- Jeroen Krabbé as Eugene Ivanov
- Jean Alexander as Mrs. Keeler
- Deborah Grant as Valerie Hobson
- Alex Norton as Detective Inspector
- Ronald Fraser as Justice Marshall
- Paul Brooke as John, Detective Sgt.
- Keith Allen as Kevin, Reporter (Sunday Pictorial)
- Ralph Brown as Paul Mann
- Oliver Ford Davies as Mr Woods
- Iain Cuthbertson as Lord Hailsham
- Johnny Shannon as Peter Rachman
- Leon Herbert as Lucky Gordon
- Stefan Kalipha as Hanif

== Production ==
=== Development ===
Australian screenwriter Michael Thomas and prospective producer Joe Boyd approached the BBC with the idea of a three-part mini-series on the Profumo affair. The BBC agreed to finance scripts for two of the 90-minute episodes, but support dried up when internal memos were found that forbade their production. Channel 4 turned them down on grounds of taste.

Boyd and Thomas joined forces with Palace Pictures who invested nearly £200,000 by 1985; a further £184,319 of development funding was raised from Robert Maxwell. As the prospects for a television mini-series began to fade, Palace Pictures became increasingly interested in making a feature film and estimated the budget requirements at £3.2 million. Co-founders Stephen Woolley and Nik Powell signed up first time director Michael Caton-Jones on a pay-or-play contract and began a marketing campaign to raise the finance. The controversial nature of the story, as well as its sexual content, appealed to Bob and Harvey Weinstein's independent film company, Miramax. The Weinsteins agreed to pay $2.35 million for the North American distribution rights. It was the first co-production for Miramax.

The original screenplay was written as a historically detailed mini-series running four to five hours. When it was pared down to film length, it became more of a docudrama, with a chronology that is sometimes unclear.

Producer Woolley arranged discreet meetings between Mandy Rice-Davies and Bridget Fonda to help the American actress with her portrayal.

=== Filming ===
Filming began in June 1988. Part of Scandal was filmed at Bathurst Mews in Bayswater, London, although Ward's house was actually at Wimpole Mews in Marylebone. The exterior of 29 Francis Street, Victoria, SW1 was used as the police station. It was also shot at Wembley Studios.

=== Poster ===
Christine Keeler took part in a publicity shoot with photographer Lewis Morley for a 1963 film about the Profumo Affair, The Keeler Affair. Under pressure to pose nude, Keeler agreed to sit straddling the chair with just the back of the chair as a screen. The film was never released in the United Kingdom, but the image became "one of the most famous and most imitated photographs ever published". Joanne Whalley recreated the pose for the theatrical release poster.

=== USA classification ===
The Weinsteins had been impressed by the amount of free publicity generated for Alan Parker's Angel Heart in 1987 when it was initially given an "X" rating in the United States. Beginning with Scandal, Harvey Weinstein would routinely help publicise Miramax's films by attacking the integrity of the Classification and Rating Administration (CARA) and X ratings. They encouraged Woolley and Powell to deliver an X rated movie, and in particular to include nude shots of Whalley-Kilmer. (Note: A body double was used when, according to Whalley-Kilmer, her husband (Val Kilmer) objected to the nude scenes.) The film was awarded an X rating for its orgy scene, but after two appeals and three seconds of edits, it was released with an "R" rating.

== Soundtrack ==
The soundtrack, and soundtrack album, included a specially written song by the Pet Shop Boys "Nothing Has Been Proved" for Dusty Springfield.

== Reception ==
The film received positive reviews. At the movie review aggregator Rotten Tomatoes, Scandal received an overall approval rating of 91% based on 34 reviews. Roger Ebert awarded it four stars out of four and said the film was "surprisingly wise about the complexities of the human heart". He praised the performance of John Hurt. Following Hurt's death, The Guardian film critic Peter Bradshaw said the performance was Hurt's masterpiece.

The film made a comfortable profit. In the UK it made £3,705,065.

Commenting on the pain felt by his parents when the film was released, David Profumo said, "I never felt sorrier for them in my life".
