= The Christine Keeler Story =

1963 film by Robert Spafford

- American theatrical release poster
- Directed by: Robert Spafford
- Screenplay by: Robert Spafford
- Produced by: John Nasht
- Starring: Yvonne Buckingham; John Drew Barrymore; Alicia Brandet
- Cinematography: Michel Rocca
- Edited by: Jim Connock
- Music by: Roger Bourdin
- Production company: Topaz Films
- Release date: 1963
- Running time: 90 minutes
- Country: Denmark
- Language: English

The Christine Keeler Story (also known as The Keeler Affair, The Christine Keeler Affair, Ich, Christine Keeler and Scandal '64) is a 1963 Danish film directed and written by Robert Spafford and starring Yvonne Buckingham, John Drew Barrymore and Alicia Brandet. The film dramatises the Profumo affair.

== Cast ==
- Yvonne Buckingham as Christine Keeler
- John Drew Barrymore as Dr. Stephen Ward
- Alicia Brandet as Mandy Rice-Davies
- Mel Welles as Yevgeni Ivanovich
- Peter Prowse as Domaren
- Mimi Heinrich as Marianne
- Christine Keeler as herself
- Mandy Rice-Davies as herself
- Jimmy Moore as Johnny Edgecombe
- Gunnar Lemvigh as the Judge
- Carl Ottosen as the Doctor
- Ole IshØy
- Lise Henningsen
- Knud Hallest

== Production ==
The film was shot in Denmark over six weeks.

To promote the film, photographer Lewis Morley photographed Keeler sitting on a chair on the first floor of Peter Cook's Establishment Club, with implied nudity. Though the film was never released in the UK, the photo was published in the Sunday Mirror and has since become well-known.

== Release ==
The film was rejected by the British Board of Film Censors (BBFC) in 1963, and in 1969 it was also rejected by the Greater London Council. It was never released in the UK, banned in New Zealand, and shown in Australia only after being edited. These factors, combined with the BBFC rejection, substantially limited its exposure and profitability.

In 1971, the film was screened in London at the New Cinema Club by Derek Hill as an act of defiance against the censor. Derek Malcolm of The Guardian said "it was scarcely worth seeing even as a curiosity, a fact that Mr Hill openly admits".

== Reception ==
Box Office wrote; "An uncompromising, poignantly probing dramatization of what will probably be the decade's most sordid story of professionalized vice. ... It has the "name" of John Drew Barrymore, son of The Great Profile, and the pacing conventionally accepted within this sphere-and-scope, and while the kiddie trade and the more impressionable viewers shouldn't be encouraged, of course, there is enough of an adult audience for this to play profitably. It's long on shock, brief on logical script denouement. But the technical writing aspects aren't of primary concern to the audience certain to be attracted by title and local-level selling. Yvonne Buckingham is a winsome Christine, and Barrymore delineates the tragic Ward figure with an impressive style. Alicia Brandet, as Mandy Rice-Davies, Christine's girl friend, and Mel Welles, as the Soviet naval attache with a wandering eye, contribute adequately. But the main acting demands – and rightly so – are on Miss Buckingham and Barrymore.

The Blackpool Tribune, reviewing the film in Boston, called it "a filmic equivalent to a sex comic."
