= Pillow talk =

Relaxed, intimate conversation between sexual partners

Pillow talk is the relaxed, intimate conversation that can occur between partners after sexual activity, usually accompanied by cuddling, caresses, kissing, and other physical intimacy. It is associated with honesty, sexual afterglow, and bonding, and is distinguished from dirty talk which sometimes forms part of foreplay and of sexual act.

== Aspects ==
The content of pillow talk can include the sexual act itself, stories and confessions, expressions of affection and appreciation, and playful humour. A line of research done on pillow talk has revolved around the hormone known as oxytocin; this "bonding hormone" is related to other effects, such as decreasing stress, decreasing perceptions of social threat, increasing bonding, and increasing the ability to read emotional cues. This hormone is known to increase in the body proceeding from sexual activity between two people that have reached the point of orgasm. The individuals involved in this act of coitus can benefit from this process by opening up a sense of communication and trust. A study done by Amanda Denes (2012), shows that partners who orgasm are more likely to engage in the act of pillow talk versus partners who do not orgasm.

In addition, a meta-analysis done on the relation between couples' sexual communication and the various dimensions of sexual function found that sexual communication was positively associated with all domains of sexual function (desire, arousal, erection, lubrication, orgasm, less pain) and overall sexual function for both men and women. In regards to desire and orgasm especially, associations with sexual communication were stronger for women than for men. The meta-analysis indicates that better sexual communication (i.e. pillow talk) is associated with greater sexual function.

Sexual afterglow, which is described as a time of heightened emotional connection, bonding, and relaxation following sexual activity, may serve as the impetus for pillow talk, as partners experiencing sexual afterglow have reported feelings of greater partner connection, which then may promote open dialogue and intimate conversation; it has been established that couples who engage in intimate behaviors (talking, kissing, and cuddling) following sexual activity report greater sexual and relationship satisfaction.

In another study examining the effects of pillow talk on relationship satisfaction, men who were directed to double the amount of pillow talk (without any specific instruction regarding the content of the communication) reported greater increases in relationship satisfaction than men who were assigned to a control condition. Notably, the women in the study did not report any significant effect on their relationship satisfaction when given the same task of doubling their pillow talk.

== Spying ==
Pillow talk is conventionally seen as an opportunity for spies to obtain secret information. In espionage, a "honeypot is a trap that uses sex to lure an enemy agent into disclosing classified information" Christine Keeler is said to have used this approach in the Cold War-era Profumo affair. The Profumo affair was a British political scandal that occurred in 1961, when John Profumo, the Secretary of State for War in Harold Macmillan's government, had a sexual encounter with Christine Keeler, who was 19 years old at that time. When the Profumo–Keeler affair was first revealed, public interest was heightened by reports that Keeler may have been simultaneously involved with Captain Yevgeny Ivanov, a Soviet naval attaché, thereby creating a possible security risk.

== Cultural examples ==
- A couple's pillow talk session is often used as a plot device in works of fiction and drama, such as movies and television. It offers a convenient setting for a couple to discuss relevant plot events or reveal new information to each other.
- A song and music video Pillow Talking recorded by American rapper Lil Dicky
- A song Pillowtalk recorded by British singer-songwriter Zayn.
- The 1959 Rock Hudson/Doris Day film Pillow Talk follows the screwball comedy format of a humorous battle of the sexes focusing on courtship, marriage--and therefore wished-for consummation and pillow talk.
