= The Trial of Christine Keeler =

2019 BBC TV historical drama series

- Genre: Drama
- Created by: Amanda Coe
- Starring: Sophie Cookson; James Norton; Ellie Bamber; Emilia Fox; Ben Miles
- Music by: Jonathan Rhys Hill
- Country of origin: United Kingdom
- Original language: English
- No. of series: 1
- No. of episodes: 6

Production
- Executive producers: Kate Triggs; Douglas Rae; Amanda Coe; Lucy Richer
- Producers: Rebecca Ferguson; Vrushank Velhankar
- Production location: Bristol
- Running time: 60 minutes
- Production companies: Ecosse Films; Great Meadow

Original release
- Network: BBC One
- Release: 29 December 2019 – 26 January 2020

The Trial of Christine Keeler is a British television series based on the chain of events surrounding the Profumo affair in the 1960s. The six-part series premiered on BBC One in the United Kingdom on 29 December 2019. The series was adapted by screenwriter Amanda Coe and stars Sophie Cookson, James Norton, Ellie Bamber, Ben Miles, Visar Vishka, Emilia Fox, Nathan Stewart-Jarrett and Anthony Welsh.

== Premise ==
Set in the year 1963, Christine Keeler, an English model and a showgirl, becomes entangled in a scandal at age 21, after a series of events involving her two ex-boyfriends Johnny Edgecombe and Lucky Gordon, in combination with MI5's secret service intrigues. These combine to reveal publicly two of Keeler's affairs from two years before when she was 19. Both affairs were with prominent married men – Soviet Union naval attaché Yevgeny Ivanov, and Secretary of State for War, John Profumo, at the height of the Cold War.

== Cast ==
=== Main cast ===
- Sophie Cookson as Christine Keeler
- James Norton as Dr. Stephen Ward, an osteopath who introduces Profumo to Keeler.
- Ellie Bamber as Mandy Rice-Davies, model, showgirl and friend of Keeler.
- Ben Miles as John Profumo, a Conservative MP and Secretary of State for War who is plunged into a scandal after his affair with Keeler is exposed.
- Emilia Fox as Valerie Hobson, the actress wife of Profumo.

=== Recurring and guest cast ===
- Nathan Stewart-Jarrett as Johnny Edgecombe, a jazz promoter whose involvement with Keeler inadvertently alerted authorities to the Profumo affair.
- Anthony Welsh as Lucky Gordon, a jazz singer who comes to public attention due to his involvement with Keeler.
- Visar Vishka as Eugene Ivanov, Soviet naval attaché having a sexual relationship with Keeler at the same time she was seeing Profumo.
- Jonny Coyne as Peter Rachman, a notorious landlord who maintained Rice-Davies as his mistress until his sudden death from a heart attack. Keeler had also previously been his mistress.
- Neran Persaud as Emil Savundra, a notorious swindler treated by Ward and who met Keeler and Rice-Davies.
- Amanda Drew as Julie Ellen Payne, Keeler's mother.
- Tim McInnerny as Martin Redmayne MP, the Chief Whip of the ruling Conservative Party.
- Michael Maloney as Viscount Astor, with whom Rice-Davies claimed in court to have had sexual intercourse.
- Anton Lesser as Michael Eddowes, a lawyer who was a close friend of Ward.
- Aidan McArdle as Roger Hollis, the Director General of MI5 from 1956–1965.
- Peter Davison as James Burge, Ward's defence barrister.
- Alex Macqueen as Mervyn Griffith-Jones, the barrister for the prosecution in Ward's trial.
- Paul Jesson as Judge Marshall, the presiding judge at Ward's trial.
- Paul Ritter as Jeremy Hutchinson, Keeler's defence barrister.
- Neil Morrissey as Colin Keeler, Keeler's estranged father.
- Danny Webb as George Wigg, a prominent opposition Labour politician.
- William Gaminara as Sir John Hobson QC MP, the Attorney General.
- Buffy Davis as Barbara Castle MP, a prominent opposition Labour politician.

== Production ==
=== Development ===
The Trial of Christine Keeler was announced as a project by the BBC in October 2017, with Amanda Coe attached to script. At the time, Coe stated, "I’m excited to have the opportunity to bring a fresh lens to a story that has become a powerful fable of our national identity. The astonishing story of Christine Keeler and the so-called Profumo affair is the Salem Witch Trial meets O.J. Simpson – a perfect storm of gender, class, race and power that resonates into the world we’re living in today."

=== Filming ===
Filming began in Bristol in December 2018. Filming was also spotted on Lansdown Terrace Lane, Cheltenham, Gloucestershire. Abbey Green and North Parade Buildings in Bath can also be seen in episode 1.

== Episodes ==
No. in series	Title	Directed by	Written by	Original release date	UK viewers (millions)
1	"Episode 1"	Andrea Harkin	Amanda Coe	29 December 2019	7.78
London, December 1962. Christine Keeler, along with Mandy Rice-Davies, is already known to MI5 through her association with Dr. Stephen Ward, who arranged sex parties for his friends in high political office, Soviet diplomats and local businessmen. Keeler comes to the attention of the police when her jealous boyfriend, Johnny Edgecombe, uses a pistol in the street outside Ward's house where she and Rice-Davies are staying. Journalists also looking for a rumoured scandal involving war minister John Profumo make Keeler an offer to sell her story.
2	"Episode 2"	Andrea Harkin	Amanda Coe	30 December 2019	6.71
January 1963. Eugene Ivanov leaves the country, having been recalled by the Soviet government after they sense an upcoming scandal. Keeler gives evidence against Edgecombe at his pre-trial hearing. Keeler is encouraged against Ward's wishes to sell her story to the Mirror group of newspapers, Rice-Davies having already done so. Keeler is shocked to find the press know that she had tried and failed as a 16-year-old to abort her baby early in her pregnancy. Her son Peter, whom Keeler gave birth to prematurely when she was 17, lived for only six days. Keeler lies by denying that Peter's father was black. Profumo denies everything and expects Ward to sort it out, but Ward's world is falling apart after Keeler's revelations in the press. Keeler suspects that Ward is a spy, and his home is burgled and papers taken.
3	"Episode 3"	Andrea Harkin	Amanda Coe	5 January 2020	6.75
March 1963. Hollis from MI5 refuses Profumo's demand that a D-Notice be issued to suppress Keeler's story in the Sunday Mirror. Profumo's attempt to buy off Keeler backfires over the amount offered. Keeler fails to attend the trial of Edgecombe as a prosecution witness, although Rice-Davies revelling in the publicity does. Edgecombe is convicted on one of four charges and sentenced to seven years imprisonment. Keeler has fled to Alicante with her manager Paul Mann. Ward sells his story to the Mirror making no mention of Profumo and discrediting Keeler. Profumo makes a statement in the House of Commons denying any impropriety with Keeler. Mann and Keeler return to England with the promise of thousands of pounds from the Daily Express. Keeler is surprised to find Ward had paid for her holiday in Spain.
4	"Episode 4"	Andrea Harkin	Amanda Coe	12 January 2020	6.11
June 1963. After seeing Ward talking to a Labour MP, Profumo wants him discredited. Hollis of MI5 finds no grounds because of Profumo's denials but the police believe Ward can be charged with living off immoral earnings. Keeler is pressurised by the police to reveal the men she has slept with. Separately Rice-Davies comes under the same scrutiny. Both women refuse to talk. Keeler is attacked by Lucky Gordon, who is successfully prosecuted and jailed on Keeler's dubious statement. Rice-Davies is jailed on remand for having a fake driving licence given to her by the late mobster landlord Peter Rachman. Ward's clients begin to cancel appointments and he sends letters to politicians and businessmen asking for help. Profumo is summoned back from holiday by the prime minister and resigns after admitting the affair with Keeler which happened two years prior. Keeler and Rice-Davies sign statements admitting they accepted money for sex. Ward is arrested.
5	"Episode 5"	Leanne Welham	Amanda Coe	19 January 2020	5.69
July 1963. Ward appears at the Old Bailey courthouse charged with living off the earnings of prostitution but is allowed freedom of movement and to live at home during the trial. Keeler and Rice-Davies appear for the prosecution along with known prostitutes. Keeler and Rice-Davies deny they are prostitutes. For the defence Ward's friends and former patients refuse to appear as character witnesses, taking their lead from Viscount Astor who has gone abroad. Profumo assures his wife that he will not be called to testify. Hollis of MI5 is untraceable. The judge during his summing up to the jury receives the news that Lucky Gordon has been released pending an appeal due to possible perjury by Keeler, and informs the jury. Ward realises as the judge said he is abandoned and alone. That evening at home while awaiting the jury's verdict he writes a series of letters while taking sleeping tablets and drinking alcohol.
6	"Episode 6"	Leanne Whelham	Amanda Coe	26 January 2020	5.85
Ward is found unconscious and rushed to a hospital. In his absence he is found guilty on two counts of living off the immoral earnings of Keeler and Rice-Davies. Ward dies a few days later without regaining consciousness. Keeler is arrested for perjury and obstructing justice. Keeler employs a sympathetic barrister, named Jeremy Hutchinson, who believes he can get her a suspended sentence if she pleads guilty to two charges. Colin Keeler, her estranged father, returns into her life. Keeler is found guilty and sentenced to nine months' imprisonment. Profumo finds employment that lasted thirty years as a volunteer for a charity, and he and his wife never speak publicly again about Keeler. Rice-Davies makes a pop record and later moves to Israel. On release from prison in 1964, Keeler returns to live with her mother in the house she bought for her, reminiscing by returning to Ward's home and a nightclub she used to frequent.

== Release ==
Keshet International handled the distribution rights internationally, with Endeavor Content in the United States.

== Reception ==
The show received generally positive reviews.

On the review aggregator website Rotten Tomatoes, 77% of 13 critics' reviews are positive, with an average rating of 6.9/10. The website's consensus reads: "Though its non-linear plotting distracts, The Trial of Christine Keeler remains an engaging -- if somewhat redundant -- lesson in history carried by the strength of its performers." Writing in the Radio Times, Paul Kirkley gave the show 4 out of 5 stars, saying:

In an age where politicians appear increasingly bulletproof in the face of scandal, there was a danger that The Trial of Christine Keeler's sexual and political shenanigans might look tame in comparison. But there's something about the characters in this particular drama that, [...] makes the story as compelling today as it was to the people following every twist and turn in the headlines six decades ago.

Lucy Mangan of The Guardian also gave the show 4 out of 5 stars, writing: "The Trial [...] remains a furiously fast, fun ride which doesn't let the deeper, darker issues fall from its grasp." However, Peter Crawley ended his review in The Irish Times by saying:

Keeler, who we see at one point playing around with a handgun in her knickers, is more armed and dangerous than just a pretty, vapid bystander, we are meant to understand. But when we later see a tabloid headline that helped thrust her into public consciousness with the words, "Model in Shooting Drama", you have to wonder, amid all the glam and gloss that surrounds her, how much deeper is the series?
