= Emil Savundra =

Sri Lankan swindler (1923-1976)

Michael Marion Emil Anacletus Pierre Savundranayagam (6 July 1923 – 21 December 1976), usually known as Emil Savundra, was a Sri Lankan swindler. The collapse of his Fire, Auto and Marine Insurance Company left about 400,000 motorists in the United Kingdom without coverage.

As a post-war black marketeer, Savundra committed bribery and fraud on an international scale before settling in the UK to sell low-cost insurance in the fast-growing automotive market. By defaulting on mandatory securities, he funded a lavish lifestyle and travelled in fashionable circles. This attracted the attention of the press, who uncovered evidence of major fraud. In a TV interview with David Frost, Savundra demonstrated contempt for his defrauded customers (some of whom were in the studio audience) and denied any moral responsibility. The police had been investigating him, and he was soon arrested and sentenced to eight years' imprisonment. Released after six, Savundra died two years later as a drug addict.

== Early life and career ==
Born into a Tamil family of lawyers in Ceylon during the British Raj, Savundra grew up with a mixture of respect for and resentment of Britain. Although he served a brief commission in the Ceylon Engineers, he was refused entry into the Royal Air Force during the Second World War despite holding a pilot's licence. Savundra married a young Tamil woman, who remained loyal to him over a turbulent thirty-year career.

When Ceylon became independent in 1948, Savundra (age 24) tried to develop a business career on the island. Around this time he developed insulin-dependent diabetes, which would shorten his life. During this period, in the context of the Korean War, Savundra was used as a local intermediary in the economic sabotage of a shipload of oil which he appeared to be selling to China but which his American contacts had ensured did not exist. After using this device to support the US war effort, he repeated the process.

In 1954, at age 31, Savundra was convicted of swindling the Kredietbank of Antwerp over a non-existent cargo of rice and was imprisoned in Belgium. In 1958 he resurfaced as a representative of American company Camp Bird for mineral interests in Ghana. Savundra was involved in bribery at the highest level of government, claiming in his diaries that this was typical Ghanaian business practice during the 1950s. He was deported from the country, presumably because a trial would have caused local embarrassment. Savundra, who had developed a career of sharp practice characteristic of a post-war black marketeer, perpetrated a coffee-bean fraud at the expense of the Costa Rican government in 1959.

His only criminal offence in Ceylon was the failure to pay an Inland Revenue bill based on earnings from some of his economic frauds. Savundra was absent from the island between 1951 and 1965, when he returned at age 42.

== Fire, Auto and Marine ==
By the early 1960s Savundra had settled in the United Kingdom, where he perpetrated the fraud for which he would be convicted in 1968. In 1963 he formed the Fire, Auto and Marine Insurance Company (FAM), which took advantage of the thriving motor-insurance industry when car ownership in the UK was increasing and road networks were being developed. FAM offered low insurance rates, with crude, but revolutionary at the time, computerisation in a collaboration with IBM.

Savundra had a lavish, high-profile lifestyle before FAM collapsed due to cash-flow problems and exposure by Sunday Times reporters of the company's lack of proper securities. His activities had included powerboat racing in the Daily Express Cowes-to-Torquay race, where many photographs exist of Savundra mingling with rich and powerful figures. In his first race he fractured his spine, and was referred by a high-society friend to osteopath Stephen Ward. Savundra became involved with Christine Keeler and Mandy Rice-Davies, and was referred to at Ward's trial as "the Indian doctor" (although he was neither Indian nor a doctor).

Because the scandal centred on the Minister of War, female escorts, the Russian defence attache, a well-known actress, a senior member of the House of Lords and many society figures, Savundra did not receive much attention. However, Keeler and Rice-Davies published autobiographies mentioning Savundra; this may have been when Private Eye began noticing Savundra's activities in London, triggering his downfall.

Savundra was one of the first controversial businessmen to use UK libel law in an attempt to prevent publications such as Private Eye from publishing allegations about his life and business practices. At his 1968 trial, witnesses testified that he presented documents indicating that he underwrote FAM with securities worth £540,000 and £870,000 in blue-chip shares; no such securities existed when the company failed. When it began to falter, FAM continued to issue coverage documents; only part of the premiums were submitted by the company's brokers (some of whom also engaged in fraud). FAM, the first of six insurance companies to fail during the 1960s and early 1970s, was noted because of Savundra. Although Vehicle and General was the largest of the companies to fail, the belief grew that FAM was deliberately failing to meet its obligations to customers.

A Sunday Times team investigating Savundra's affairs reported that his "reserves" in stock worth nearly a million pounds were forgeries. According to his defenders (who overlooked his track record in fraudulent trading), he insured high-risk clients and did not realise that he should allocate more resources to cover claims. Although Savundra reportedly transferred FAM assets to a bank in Liechtenstein, no such funds were found.

In May 1966, after a heart attack, the 42-year-old Savundra sold his FAM shares to his FAM directors. Led by Stuart de Quincy Walker, the company quickly collapsed and left an estimated 400,000 motorists uninsured. Savundra was pursued by the media, who besieged his mansion in Hampstead for days.

He fled to his native Ceylon, where he was sheltered by relatives, and the Ceylonese government refused to confirm that they would deny a British request for extradition. In December, Savundra returned to Europe; he was in Rome for a month, still pursued by the British press. In January 1967, he re-entered the United Kingdom; at age 44, he was dependent on pethidine for back pain.

== Frost Programme controversy ==
Savundra on The Frost Programme

The fraudulent nature of Savundra's business affairs was again made public in 1967 as the result of a television interview by David Frost on the Rediffusion London show, The Frost Programme. The previous week, Frost had announced that he would include the story of the FAM debacle and Savundra in his next programme. Savundra injected himself with pethidine before the interview, appearing oddly calm despite Frost's aggressive questioning. Frost encouraged the studio audience to heckle Savundra. For his part, Savundra called Frost the "finest swordsman in England" and also referred to the audience (which included his clients, victims of the insurance-company failure) as "peasants" and claimed "no moral responsibility" for what had happened.

Frost (who had expected that Savundra would express remorse to his victims) confronted him about his conduct, and the programme ended with shouts from the audience of "Well done, Frostie!" The interview was quickly dubbed "trial by television", and caused concern by Rediffusion management that Savundra's right to a fair trial had been compromised. The programme enhanced Frost's reputation in the UK as a vigorous interviewer.

== Imprisonment and death ==
Savundra was arrested shortly after his appearance on The Frost Programme after a two-year police investigation. In March 1968, he was sentenced to eight years' imprisonment with a £50,000 fine or an additional two years' imprisonment. Savundra was eventually placed in the prison hospital, where he became addicted to drugs to control persistent pain. Whilst he was in prison, it was discovered that he had used his wealth to go to clinics around the world; the clinic records were collected and collated. Savundra was released from prison shortly before Christmas in 1974, still addicted to drugs. He died in Old Windsor, near Windsor, Berkshire, on 21 December 1976 at age 53. Survived by his widow, Savundra was registered as a "retired banker" and was a Roman Catholic.

== In popular culture ==
In "The Death List", an episode of the television comedy Yes Minister, Cabinet Minister Jim Hacker briefly panics over the possibility that a character reference he once wrote for Savundra might be leaked to the press.

== Sources ==
- Connell, Jon; Douglas Sutherland (1978). Fraud: The Amazing Career of Doctor Savundra. Hodder & Stoughton. ISBN 0-340-22601-3.
- Emil Savundra Wormwood Scrub Diaries (2008)
- King-Hamilton QC, Alan (1982). And Nothing But the Truth: An Autobiography. Weidenfeld and Nicolson. ISBN 0-297-78053-0.
- Chambers Biographical Dictionary Centenary Edition. Chambers. 1997. ISBN 0-550-16060-4.
- Rice-Davies, Mandy; Shirley Flack (1980). Mandy. Sphere Books. ISBN 0722128487.
- Knightley, Phillip; Caroline Kennedy (1987). An Affair of State/The Profumo Case and the Framing of Stephen Ward. Jonathan Cape. ISBN 0-224-02347-0.
- Kennedy, Ludovic (1964). The Trial of Stephen Ward. ISBN 0-575-04194-3.
