= Stephen Ward (musical) =

2013 British musical

- The Scandal That Shook Society
- Music: Andrew Lloyd Webber
- Lyrics: Don Black; Christopher Hampton
- Book: Don Black; Christopher Hampton
- Basis: The Profumo affair and the life of Stephen Ward
- Premiere: 19 December 2013: Aldwych Theatre
- Productions: 2013 West End

Stephen Ward is a musical with a book and lyrics by Don Black and Christopher Hampton, with music by Andrew Lloyd Webber. The musical is based on the 1963 Profumo affair involving the War Minister John Profumo and the socialite Stephen Ward who introduced Profumo to his mistress Christine Keeler, who was also involved with a Russian spy. The musical's world premiere was in London's West End at the Aldwych Theatre in 2013.

== Background ==
In February 2012, Webber first revealed in an interview with the British broadcaster Chris Evans that he was considering working on a show based on the Profumo affair. A first reading of the musical was held in London in early 2013, with its first public staging in March, with Miloš Karadaglić performing the title song from the show on an ITV special Andrew Lloyd Webber: 40 Musical Years. The track was later released as a digital download.

Officially confirmed on 28 June 2013, producers announced that the initial production would be staged at the Aldwych Theatre, with tickets going on sale immediately. The show, budgeted at £2.5 million had a book with lyrics by Don Black and Christopher Hampton and is directed by Richard Eyre, with choreography by Stephen Mear, set design by Rob Howell, lighting design by Peter Mumford and sound by Paul Groothuis.

In 2014, the full libretto of the musical was published by Faber and Faber in book form.

== Production history ==
=== West End (2013) ===
Stephen Ward began previews on 3 December 2013, at the Aldwych Theatre, London, before holding its official opening night on 19 December, booking until 1 March. On 6 September 2013, full casting was announced with Alexander Hanson playing the title role of Stephen Ward, Charlotte Spencer as Christine Keeler, Joanna Riding as Valerie Hobson, Charlotte Blackledge as Mandy Rice Davies, Anthony Calf as Lord Astor, Daniel Flynn as John Profumo, Ian Conningham as Ivanov, Christopher Howell as Percival Murray, Ricardo Coke Thomas as Lucky Gordon and Wayne Robinson as Johnny Edgecombe.

The West End production of Stephen Ward received mixed reviews from critics. The official opening night was overshadowed by an incident at the Apollo Theatre: during a performance of The Curious Incident of the Dog in the Night-Time, part of the theatre's ceiling fell onto the audience. Members of the West End theatre circuit, managers and producers, who were attending the premiere of Stephen Ward were told of the incident during the interval; many left the theatre to attend to the incident at the Apollo Theatre. Media who were attending Stephen Ward were diverted by news-desks to cover the incident at the Apollo Theatre. The planned after-show press room was cancelled, once the scale of the incident at the Apollo Theatre became clear and that audience members had been hurt.

Despite initially announcing the production would extend to 31 May, the show closed on 29 March 2014, the same day as Lloyd Webber's former lyricist collaborator Tim Rice's show From Here to Eternity. A typical London performance ran 2hrs 20mins, including one interval. Michael Billington wrote that Lloyd Webber's "great gift is for writing music about either fulfilled or unrequited romantic passion". On Stephen Ward, he wondered why Lloyd Webber "ever felt it was the right subject for his particular talents and why the producers thought a show about a flagrant miscarriage of justice half a century ago had much resonance for a modern audience." An admirer of Lloyd Webber, Billington believed such a project had demanded the "satirical bite" which Kander and Ebb displayed in the musicals Cabaret and Chicago.

== Music ==
=== Musical numbers ===
Act I

1. The Chamber of Horrors

- "Human Sacrifice" – Stephen Ward

2. Murray's Club

- "Super Duper Hula Hooper" – Crooner, The Hula girls
- "When You Get To Know Me" – Stephen Ward, Christine Keeler

3. Wraysbery

- "You're So Very Clever To Have Found This" – Stephen Ward, Christine Keeler

4. The Cottage at Cliveden

- "This Side Of The Sky" – Stephen Ward, Christine Keeler

5. Murray's Club

- "Super Duper Hula Hooper (Reprise)" – Crooner, The Hula girls°
- "Manipulation" – Stephen Ward, Yevgeny Ivanov, Mandy Rice-Davies, Christine Keeler

6. Wimpole Mews

- "He Sees Something In Me" – Christine Keeler, Mandy Rice-Davies

7. A Party in Hyde Park Square

- "You've Never Had It So Good" – Company

8.The El Rio Cafe in Notting Hill

- "Black-Hearted Woman" – Lucky Gordon

9. Astor's House in Cliveden

- "Mother Russia, While We Can" – Yevgeny Ivanov, Stephen Ward, Christine Keeler

10. Wimpole Mews

- "Love Nest" – John Profumo, Christine Keeler
- "Freedom Means The World To Me" – Stephen Ward, Christine Keeler & Mandy Rice-Davies °
- "1963" – Christine Keeler, Mandy Rice-Davies

Act II

1. Wimpole Mews

- "Human Sacrifice (Reprise)" – Stephen Ward, Christine Keeler, Mandy Rice-Davies °

2. An Office at the News of the World

- "Give Us Something Juicy" – Christine Keeler, Journalists

3. The Dorchester Hotel

4. The Profumo's House in Chester Terrace

- "Profumo's House" – Valerie Hobson, John Profumo, Martin Redmayne, Sir Peter Rawlinson, Sir John Hobson

5. House of Commons

6. The Home Secretary's Quarters in the Home Office

- "Manipulation (Reprise)" – Henry Brooke, Roger Hollis, Sir John Simpson

7. Marylebone Police Station

- "Police Interview" – Christine Keeler, Mandy Rice-Davies, Lucky Gordon, CI Samuel Herbert, D/Sgt Diggs, Vickie Barrett, Ronna Ricardo

8. The Hotel Cipriani, Venice

- "I'm Hopeless When It Comes To You" – Valerie Hobson

9. The Arrest

- "The Arrest" – Company

10. Court No.1 at the Old Bailey

- "The Trial" – Stephen Ward, James Burge, Mervyn Griffith-Jones, Judge

11. Wimpole Mews

- "Too Close To The Flame" – Stephen Ward

12. The Chamber of Horrors, Blackpool

- Final Scene – Stephen Ward°

°Not released on the original cast recording of the musical

== Recordings ==
A West End original cast album was released on 30 December 2013, featuring nineteen songs. The album released by Decca Records was originally slated for a March 2014 release, but was brought forward due to demand.

Stephen Ward

Soundtrack album cast recording by Various
- Released: 30 December 2013
- Label: Decca Records

No.	Title	Length
1.	"Human Sacrifice"	5:01
2.	"Super Duper Hula Hooper"	1:36
3.	"When You Get To Know Me"	3:23
4.	"You're So Very Clever To Have Found This"	3:09
5.	"This Side Of The Sky"	4:33
6.	"Manipulation"	4:31
7.	"He Sees Something In Me"	2:05
8.	"You've Never Had It So Good"	4:41
9.	"Black-Hearted Woman"	2:20
10.	"Mother Russia, While We Can"	4:12
11.	"Love Nest"	2:25
12.	"1963"	3:47
13.	"Give Us Something Juicy"	2:47
14.	"Manipulation (reprise)"	2:13
15.	"Police Interview"	6:33
16.	"I'm Hopeless When It Comes To You"	3:45
17.	"The Arrest"	1:10
18.	"The Trial"	5:08
19.	"Too Close To The Flame"	6:29

== Principal roles and cast members ==
Character	Original West End actor
Stephen Ward	Alexander Hanson
Christine Keeler	Charlotte Spencer
Mandy Rice-Davies	Charlotte Blackledge
Lord Astor	Anthony Calf
John Profumo	Daniel Flynn
Valerie Hobson	Joanna Riding
Johnny Edgecombe	Wayne Robinson
Yevgeny Ivanov	Ian Conningham
Lucky Gordon	Ricardo Coke Thomas
Percival Murray	Christopher Howell
