= Wimpole Mews =

Street in Marylebone, London W1, England

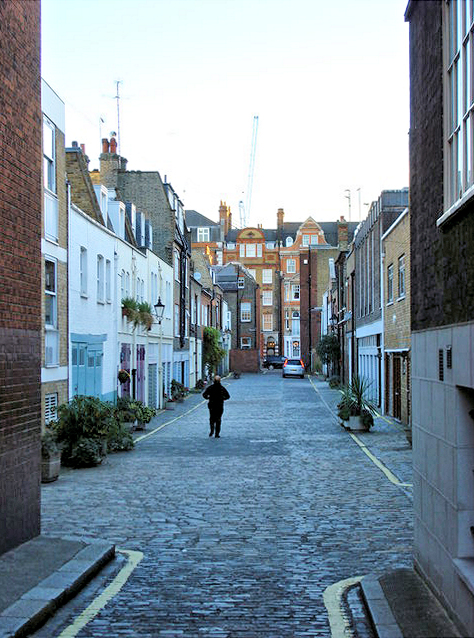
- View along Wimpole Mews
- Interactive map of Wimpole Mews
- Location: Marylebone, London, United Kingdom
- Postal code: W1
- Nearest Tube station: Regent's Park
- Coordinates: 51.519930°N 0.148217°W
- North: Weymouth Street
- East: Harley Street
- South: New Cavendish Street
- West: Wimpole Street

Other
- Known for: Profumo affair

Wimpole Mews is a mews street in Marylebone, London W1, England. It is known for being a key location in the Profumo affair in the early 1960s.

The street runs north–south, with Weymouth Street to the north and New Cavendish Street to the south. To the east is Harley Street and to the west is Wimpole Street. It is named after Wimpole Hall in Cambridgeshire, the seat of Edward Harley, 2nd Earl of Oxford and Earl Mortimer.

17 Wimpole Mews was the home of the osteopath Stephen Ward (1912–1963) in the early 1960s. He acted as "landlord" to Christine Keeler (1942–2017) and Mandy Rice-Davies (1944–2014). Keeler had affairs with the politician John Profumo (1915–2006), Secretary of State for War, and the Soviet naval attaché and spy Captain Yevgeny Ivanov (1926–1994), resulting in the Profumo affair scandal in 1963. In December 1962, Johnny Edgecombe (1932–2010), a former lover of Christine Keeler, fired five shots at the lock of 17 Wimpole Mews using a handgun that Keeler had given him, triggering events that led to the scandal.

The experiences of Christine Keeler were dramatised as the six-part television serial The Trial of Christine Keeler and broadcast by the BBC during December 2019 to January 2020, featuring events in Wimpole Mews.

== See also ==
- Street names of Marylebone

== Bibliography ==
- Fairfield, Sheila (1983). The Streets Of London: A Dictionary Of The Names And Their Origins. Papermac. ISBN 978-0-333-28649-4.
- Bebbington, Gillian (1972). London Street Names. Batsford Books. ISBN 978-0-333-28649-4.
