= Lucky Gordon =

British-based Jamaican jazz singer (1931–2017)

- Born: Aloysius Gordon; 5 July 1931; Kingston, Colony of Jamaica, British Empire
- Died: 15 March 2017 (aged 85); London, England
- Other names: Casbah
- Occupations: Jazz singer, chef
- Known for: Profumo affair

Aloysius "Lucky" Gordon (5 July 1931 – 15 March 2017) was a British-based Jamaican jazz singer who came to public attention during the Profumo affair. He arrived in Scotland from Jamaica in 1948, and moved to London after a few days.

== Early years ==
Aloysius "Lucky" Gordon was born in Kingston, Jamaica, and stowed away to Britain in 1947, according to his account to the Jamaica Observer in a 1998 interview.

== Profumo affair ==
Joining his brother, "Psycho" Gordon, on the London jazz scene, Lucky became involved with nightclub hostess Christine Keeler in late 1961, a relationship that ended acrimoniously, although Keeler disputed there was ever a relationship between them. According to Keeler, he raped her at knifepoint at his flat in St Stephen's Square, assaulted her in the street and held her hostage for two days. Keeler sought the protection of her lover, Johnny Edgecombe, which culminated in a public fight between Edgecombe and Gordon at the Flamingo Club in Wardour Street in October 1962. Gordon required 17 stitches after Edgecombe slit his face with a knife. He later posted the 17 used stitches to Keeler and warned her that for each stitch he had sent she would get two on her face in return.

Fearful of reprisals from Gordon, Edgecombe asked Keeler to help him find a solicitor so he could surrender himself to police. But Keeler, jealous that Edgecombe (the man she called "the Edge") had taken another lover, refused to help him and said she planned to give evidence against him in court. This led to Edgecombe firing gunshots outside Keeler's "protector" Stephen Ward's flat in December 1962 that in turn set in motion a chain of events that would eventually result in the public revelations of the Profumo affair.

In June 1963, Gordon was jailed for three years for assaulting Keeler. However, in December 1963, Gordon's three-year sentence for her assault was overturned by the Court of Appeal, and Keeler was accused of lying at his trial, because she had protected two of the men present at the assault by testifying that they were not there. She pleaded guilty to perjury and was sentenced to nine months in Holloway Prison.

== Musical career ==
Gordon later worked as a cook at Island Records' Basing Street Studios near Ladbroke Grove, his employers including Bob Marley. After the studio changed ownership to become Sarm West Studios in the mid-1980s, Gordon contributed "skank" vocals to a cover version of "Heaven Knows I'm Miserable Now" by pop duo Act (under the name of "Casbah"), and a rare vocal mix of the Art of Noise's "Moments in Love", both for ZTT Records.

Gordon died on 15 March 2017, aged 85.

== Cultural references ==
- In the 1989 film Scandal about the Profumo affair, Gordon was portrayed by Leon Herbert.
- Gordon was portrayed by Ricardo Coke Thomas in Andrew Lloyd Webber's stage musical Stephen Ward the Musical, which opened at the Aldwych Theatre on 19 December 2013.
- Anthony Welsh acts the part of Lucky Gordon in the BBC series The Trial of Christine Keeler.
- In 2020, Emily Capell and Dreadzone released "Flamingo", a musical retelling of the story.
