= Kill Me Again =

1989 film by John Dahl

- Theatrical release poster
- Directed by: John Dahl
- Written by: John Dahl; David W. Warfield
- Produced by: David W. Warfield; Steve Golin; Sigurjón Sighvatsson; Anabelle Davidson
- Starring: Val Kilmer; Joanne Whalley-Kilmer; Michael Madsen; Jon Gries
- Cinematography: Jacques Steyn
- Edited by: Eric L. Beason; Frank E. Jimenez; Jonathan P. Shaw
- Music by: William Olvis
- Production companies: PolyGram Movies; Propaganda Films
- Distributed by: Metro-Goldwyn-Mayer
- Release date: October 27, 1989
- Running time: 94 minutes
- Country: United States
- Language: English
- Budget: $4 million
- Box office: $283,694

Kill Me Again is a 1989 American independent crime thriller film directed by John Dahl (in his directorial debut) and written by Dahl and David W. Warfield. Starring Val Kilmer, Joanne Whalley, and Michael Madsen, the neo-Western and neo-noir film follows a young private detective who becomes involved with a woman who is on the run from her psychopathic boyfriend. Jonathan Gries, Bibi Besch, and Michael Greene appear in supporting roles.

The film received mixed reviews, and did not receive a wide release, resulting in low box office.

== Plot ==
In Nevada, criminal couple Vince Miller and Fay Forrester steal $850,000 from mobsters at a Winnemucca casino, killing one in the process. During their getaway to Hells Canyon in Idaho, the two get into an argument. Fay knocks out the controlling Vince at a rest stop and escapes with the money. Jack Andrews, a widowed Reno private investigator drowning in $10,000 of gambling debt, is approached by Fay. She poses as an abused wife and offers him $10,000 to fake her death. Though skeptical, Jack agrees to help, eager to pay off his debts. He gives her the false identity of Vera Billings, a woman from West Virginia.

After staging Fay's death, Jack discovers she has fled to Las Vegas with half his payment. Police briefly arrest him for her "murder" but release him due to insufficient evidence. Meanwhile, Vince learns of Jack's involvement through newspaper reports. When loan sharks take the remainder of Jack's advance payment, he decides to follow Fay to Vegas. Before he can leave, Vince attacks him demanding Fay's whereabouts, but Jack escapes. The mob also targets Jack, believing he has their money.

In Vegas, Jack locates Fay gambling with the stolen money. Before he can get answers, mobsters confront them in her hotel room. Fay shoots one dead while the other escapes. As they flee, Fay admits she stole the money from Vince after he stole it from the mob. The pair hide at a lakeside motel where they become intimate. Jack suggests starting a new life in Maine, and Fay agrees. When they learn police are seeking them for the mobster's murder, Fay suggests they fake their deaths to escape.

Jack calls his partner Alan to say goodbye, accidentally revealing their location. He then explains his plan to Fay: they'll stage a boat explosion to fake their deaths, then retrieve the hidden money before fleeing to Maine. Meanwhile, Vince tortures and kills Alan to discover their whereabouts.

Jack leaves Fay at the motel while he buries the money and supplies on an Indian reservation. Upon returning, he finds Vince holding Fay at gunpoint. Jack negotiates, offering half the money in exchange for their freedom. Vince restrains Jack in a closet, then assaults Fay, who manages to grab the gun and shoot him.

The couple flee to retrieve the money, but Vince appears, revealing Fay's betrayal. Fay shoots Jack, who falls into the lake. Fay and Vince take the briefcase and escape in Jack's car, only to discover it's empty. Police chase them to the border where they die in a fiery crash. Jack, wounded but alive and in possession of the money, is rescued from the lake by two Native Americans who drive him to safety.

== Cast ==
- Val Kilmer as Jack Andrews
- Joanne Whalley-Kilmer as Fay Forrester
- Michael Madsen as Vince Miller
- Jonathan Gries as Alan Swayzie
- Michael Greene as Lieutenant Hendrix
- Bibi Besch as Jack's Secretary
- Joseph Carberry as Jonesy
- Pat Mulligan as Sammy
- Michael Sharrett as Tim, Motel Clerk

== Production ==
=== Development ===
While working as a storyboarder on features like Robocop and Something Wild, John Dahl was also writing spec scripts with his writing partner David W. Warfield. When Warfield posed the question of how to get someone to utter the phrase ‘Kill me again’, the pair decided to make their next project a neo-noir, inspired by pulp fiction titles such as D.O.A..

Dahl and Warfield made a pact that they would accept offers to sell the script for $300,000 or above, otherwise they would make it themselves, with Warfield producing and Dahl directing. Having failed to garner offers above $250,000, the pair set about making the film themselves. Through Steve Golin and Sigurjón Sighvatsson’s production company they reached a deal with PolyGram to produce Kill Me Again, with Dahl directing. MGM agreed to co-finance the production if they could get Val Kilmer to star.

Kilmer’s name was prominent at the time, having just starred in Willow. He ended up getting paid twice what he earned on that film for Kill Me Again. Dahl said that Kilmer was difficult to work with, although he helped in getting Joanne Whalley for the female lead. Dahl and the producers were interested in casting Whalley, who unbeknownst to them was married to Kilmer. When they mentioned her name to Kilmer he said, ‘Oh that’s interesting because I’m actually married to her.’

=== Filming ===
Kill Me Again was shot in Nevada in Reno, Hazen, and Las Vegas, with additional photography occurring in Los Angeles, California.

== Release ==
Metro-Goldwyn-Mayer and Kilmer were cool on the final product, and little money or effort was spent on promoting it. It received a limited theatrical release on October 27, 1989, showing in around 200 theaters in the United States. Pat Broeske of the Los Angeles Times described the initial release as a "disastrous regional opening."

Some good reviews were enough to persuade the studio to show it in one theater in Los Angeles, earning the film a positive review in the Los Angeles Times and an extended run in Los Angeles. However, this was not enough to influence MGM into promoting the film further.

=== Home media ===
MGM/UA Home Entertainment released the film on VHS in 1990.

MGM Home Entertainment released the film on DVD in 2000. Olive Films released the film on Blu-ray on March 22, 2016.

== Reception ==
=== Box office ===
The film was a failure at the box office, grossing $283,694 but it later achieved some success on home video.

=== Critical response ===
On the review aggregator website Rotten Tomatoes, 78% of 9 critics' reviews are positive, with an average rating of 6.3/10.

The film drew a mixed reception. Variety gave it a mostly positive review, stating: "The tale of a down-and-out detective and a seamy femme fatale is a thoroughly professional little entertainment. Time Out gave it a mostly negative review, complaining: "Derived from assorted Hitchcocks and noir classics, the tortuous storyline of writer-director Dahl's determinedly sordid thriller has its moments," but was critical of the three lead actors and concludes: "Setting its study of betrayal and deceit in and around the gambling towns of the Nevada desert, the film sporadically achieves a truly seedy atmosphere, but there are too many symbols, too many loose ends, and too many vaguely sensationalist scenes. Mick LaSalle of the San Francisco Chronicle gave the film a favorable review, writing that it "packs a punch, with tense moments, unexpected turns and a hot performance from Joanne Whalley-Kilmer."

Michael Wilmington of the Los Angeles Times also assessed the film favorably, writing: "Kill Me Again doesn’t look like the noir classics; instead of black-and-white, it’s shot in slightly muddy color with vagrant green tints. But it feels like them. It has that nerve-jangling mix of pungent cynicism and thick gobs of pseudo-Expressionist style. It’s not brilliant or original, but it’s still a lean, fast, wide-awake sleeper."

Jeff Millar of The Houston Chronicle felt the film lacked originality, calling it a "copybook exercise" in film noir, drawing comparisons to Mildred Pierce (1945), Double Indemnity (1944), and The Postman Always Rings Twice (1946). Variety gave the film's performances a mixed assessment, writing: "Whalley-Kilmer takes to the role of a really bad girl with glee, always seeming to be just barely wearing whatever outfit she’s shimmied into. Kilmer is somewhat less successful with his part, as it’s difficult to tell how smart or stupid he’s meant to be. Both Kilmers get fine support from Madsen as a fully functioning psychotic."

In a retrospective review for Trailers from Hell, critic Glenn Erickson praised Kill Me Again as "one of the best neo-noirs."

== See also ==
- List of American films of 1989

== Sources ==
- Jarecki, Nicholas (2001). Breaking In: How 20 Film Directors Got Their Start. New York City, New York: Broadway Books. ISBN 978-0-7679-0674-6.
- Silver, Alain; Ward, Elizabeth, eds. (1992). Film Noir: An Encyclopedic Reference to the American Style (Third ed.). Woodstock, New York: The Overlook Press. ISBN 978-0-879-51479-2.
