= Joanne Whalley =

British actress (born 1961)

- Born: 25 August 1961 (age 65); Salford, Lancashire, England
- Other name: Joanne Whalley-Kilmer
- Occupation: Actress
- Years active: 1974–present
- Spouse: Val Kilmer (m. 1988; div. 1996)
- Children: 2, including Jack Kilmer

Joanne Whalley (born 25 August 1961) is an English film and television actress. She was credited as Joanne Whalley-Kilmer from 1988 to 1996 during her marriage to Val Kilmer.

Whalley came to fame through television with appearances in drama serials Edge of Darkness (1985), for which she was nominated for the BAFTA TV Award for Best Actress, and The Singing Detective (1986). She has also appeared in both British and American feature films, including Willow (1988), where she met Kilmer, and Scandal (1989). On the stage, her performance in Saved earned her a nomination for the Laurence Olivier Award for Best Actress in 1985.

Whalley's subsequent career has seen her cast as a number of iconic historical and fictional figures, including Scarlett O'Hara in Scarlett (1994), Jackie Kennedy in Jackie Bouvier Kennedy Onassis (2000), Queen Mary I in The Virgin Queen (2005), and Catherine of Aragon in Wolf Hall (2015).

== Early life and education ==
Joanne Whalley was born on 25 August 1961 in Salford, Lancashire. She later moved to Levenshulme, Manchester and then to Stockport, Greater Manchester. She attended Bredbury Comprehensive School in Stockport before leaving to study at Harrytown Convent Girls' School in Romiley and the Braeside School of Speech and Drama in Marple.

== Career ==
=== Early career ===
As a child actress from 1974 to 1979, Whalley made a number of television appearances, including bit parts in popular soap operas Coronation Street and Emmerdale Farm.

She made her feature film debut as a young Beatles fan in Richard Marquand's biographical film, Birth of the Beatles, in 1979. She flirted with the fringes of the Manchester new wave scene by briefly being a member of a Stockport-based band called the Slowguns but left before the release of the first of their two singles later that year. Her television work continued with early appearances in episodes of popular series including Juliet Bravo and The Gentle Touch.

From 1982 to 1986 Whalley studied and performed with the Royal Court Theatre, starting at the 1982 Young Writers' Festival by originating the role of Rita in Max Stafford-Clark's first production of Andrea Dunbar's Rita, Sue and Bob Too. That same year she made a non-speaking appearance as a groupie in Alan Parker's musical drama Pink Floyd – The Wall (1982), featured in Stan Barstow's well-received TV series A Kind of Loving (Granada, 1982), and starred as Gilly Brown alongside Trevor Eve in Danny Boyle's production of The Genius at the Royal Court Theatre.

At this time she was also the lead singer of the pop group Cindy & The Saffrons; they recorded the Shangri-Las' song "Past, Present and Future" in 1982 at Abbey Road Studios, and the track made the UK singles charts, peaking at #56. The next year they recorded "Terry", written and originally recorded by Twinkle, but this single failed to chart. The group split up soon afterward.

Continuing her theatrical work, Whalley played the title role in the first production of Daniel Mornin's Kate at the Bush Theatre in 1983. That year she also appeared in episodes of popular TV series Bergerac and Reilly, Ace of Spies. Her work for the English Stage Company at the Royal Court Theatre continued with performances as Pam in Danny Boyle's production of Saved and June in Max Stafford-Clark's The Pope's Wedding from 1984 to 1985. Her performance in Saved earned her a nomination for the Laurence Olivier Award for Best Actress in 1985.

=== Rise to prominence ===
Whalley found early success on British television with a lead role in Troy Kennedy Martin's highly regarded and influential drama serial Edge of Darkness (BBC, 1985), for which she was nominated for the BAFTA TV Award for Best Actress. At this time she appeared in Alan Bleasdale's comedy film No Surrender (1985) and two films for Mike Newell: The Good Father (FilmFour, 1985) and the critically acclaimed Dance with a Stranger (Goldcrest, 1985). Whalley also concluded her work at the Royal Court Theatre that year by performing the role of Bianca in William Gaskill's production of Women Beware Women and then moved to the Royal National Theatre appearing as Dewey Dell in Peter Gill's productions of As I Lay Dying at the Cottesloe Theatre.

Further television success came with the key role of Nurse Mills in Dennis Potter's drama serial The Singing Detective (BBC, 1986). Whalley concluded her work with the Royal National Theatre that year by performing as Euphie and 1st Cutie in Peter Gill and John Burgess's The Women. The following year she performed as Masha in Bill Kenwright and Elijah Moshinsky's production of Three Sisters at the Albery Theatre and the Greenwich Theatre.

Whalley met the American actor Val Kilmer in 1987 during the filming of her first U.S. lead role in George Lucas and Ron Howard's Academy Award-nominated fantasy adventure Willow (1988). After her wedding to Kilmer in 1988, she moved to Los Angeles to continue her film career and began using 'Joanne Whalley-Kilmer' as her professional SAG-AFTRA name.

Her most notable British film role to date is Christine Keeler in Michael Caton-Jones's historical drama Scandal (1989), a fictionalised account of the Profumo affair, which screened in competition at the 1989 Cannes Film Festival, featuring John Hurt as Stephen Ward and Sir Ian McKellen as John Profumo. That same year she also co-starred with Kilmer in John Dahl's neo-noir Kill Me Again (1989) and received a Theatre World Award for her performance of Geraldine Barklay in John Tillinger's off-Broadway production of What the Butler Saw for the Manhattan Theatre Club.

Further theatrical work came with her performance in the title role of Lulu in Ian McDiarmid's production of The Lulu Plays at the Almeida Theatre in 1990 to 1991. Later that year she gave birth to her first child, Mercedes, in Santa Fe, New Mexico.

Whalley recreated Margaret Mitchell's iconic heroine Scarlett O'Hara, originally played by Vivien Leigh in Gone with the Wind (1939), in the Emmy Award-winning TV miniseries Scarlett (CBS, 1994). That same year she also played the lead role in Heywood Gould's legal thriller Trial by Jury (1994). She gave birth to her second child, Jack, the following year.

After her divorce from Kilmer in 1996, she changed her surname back to Whalley, starting with her lead role in Jon Amiel's spy comedy The Man Who Knew Too Little (1997) starring Bill Murray. She played the title role of former U.S. First Lady Jackie Kennedy in David Burton Morris's Emmy Award-winning miniseries Jackie Bouvier Kennedy Onassis (CBS, 2000).

=== 21st century ===
Whalley collaborated with the pop-punk band Blink-182, reading a letter at the beginning of the song "Stockholm Syndrome".

In 2005 she appeared as Queen Mary I in The Virgin Queen, a BBC serial about the life of Queen Elizabeth I which also starred Anne-Marie Duff and Tara FitzGerald. That same year she filmed Played, which also starred her ex-husband Val Kilmer. However, the two did not share any scenes together. In 2006 she appeared in Life Line, a two-part drama on BBC1, starring opposite Ray Stevenson.

In February 2008 Whalley appeared on stage in Billy Roche's Poor Beast in the Rain, presented by the Salem K. Theatre Company at the Matrix Theatre in Los Angeles. In that same year, Whalley was also a regular in the ITV miniseries Flood with Robert Carlyle amongst others.

Whalley played one of the female leads, Vannozza dei Cattanei, mistress of Cardinal Rodrigo Borgia, future Pope Alexander VI, in the Showtime historical drama series The Borgias (2011), for which she was nominated for a Best Actress Golden Nymph Award at the Monte-Carlo Television Festival.

She guest-starred as Princess Sophie in season 4 of Gossip Girl. With the cast of 44 Inch Chest, she shared the Best Ensemble Award at the San Diego Film Critics Society Awards 2010. The film reunited her with John Hurt, with whom she had done two films. In 2014 she played Aunt Patience in Jamaica Inn for BBC One. In 2015 she played Claudia, the wife of Pontius Pilate, in A.D. The Bible Continues and Catherine of Aragon in the BBC miniseries Wolf Hall.

Whalley has appeared in a number of streaming shows: as Sister Maggie in the third season of Daredevil (2018), reprising her role of Sorsha from the Willow film (Lucasfilm, 1988) in the Willow series (Disney+, 2022), and a starring appearance in an episode of the second season of Carnival Row (Prime, 2023) as the "Puck" Leonora.

In 2020 Whalley starred in Eleanor Coppola's anthology film Love Is Love Is Love. It was scheduled to have its world premiere at the Tribeca Film Festival in April 2020, but the festival was postponed due to the COVID-19 pandemic. The film later premiered at the Deauville American Film Festival in France in September.

== Personal life ==
Whalley met American actor Val Kilmer while filming the movie Willow. The couple married in 1988. Whalley took a break from acting to bring up their two children, Mercedes and Jack. Shortly after that, the pair separated. Whalley filed for divorce on 21 July 1995, citing irreconcilable differences.

== Filmography ==
=== Film ===
| Year | Title | Role | Notes |
|---|---|---|---|
| 1979 | Birth of the Beatles | Schoolgirl | Uncredited role |
| 1982 | Pink Floyd – The Wall | Groupie | |
| 1985 | Dance with a Stranger | Christine | |
| 1985 | No Surrender | Cheryl | |
| 1985 | The Good Father | Mary Hall | |
| 1987 | Shoreleave | Myra | Short film |
| 1988 | Willow | Sorsha | |
| 1988 | To Kill a Priest | Anna | |
| 1989 | Scandal | Christine Keeler | as Joanne Whalley-Kilmer |
| 1989 | Kill Me Again | Fay Forrester | as Joanne Whalley-Kilmer |
| 1990 | Navy SEALs | Claire Varrens | as Joanne Whalley-Kilmer |
| 1990 | The Big Man | Beth Scoular | as Joanne Whalley-Kilmer |
| 1991 | Shattered | Jenny Scott | as Joanne Whalley-Kilmer |
| 1991 | Storyville | Natalie Tate | as Joanne Whalley-Kilmer |
| 1993 | The Secret Rapture | Katherine Coleridge | as Joanne Whalley-Kilmer |
| 1994 | Mother's Boys | Colleen 'Callie' Harland | as Joanne Whalley-Kilmer |
| 1994 | A Good Man in Africa | Celia Adekunle | as Joanne Whalley-Kilmer |
| 1994 | Trial by Jury | Valerie Alston | as Joanne Whalley-Kilmer |
| 1997 | The Man Who Knew Too Little | Lori | |
| 1999 | A Texas Funeral | Miranda | |
| 2000 | The Guilty | Natalie Crane | |
| 2000 | Breathtaking | Caroline Henshaw | |
| 2002 | Virginia's Run | Jessie Eastwood | |
| 2002 | Before You Go | Mary | |
| 2005 | The Californians | Luna | |
| 2006 | Played | Maggie | |
| 2007 | Flood | Commissioner Patricia Nash | |
| 2009 | 44 Inch Chest | Liz Diamond | |
| 2011 | Golf in the Kingdom | Agatha McNaughton | |
| 2011 | Twixt | Denise | |
| 2017 | Muse | Jacqueline | |
| 2018 | Paul, Apostle of Christ | Priscilla | |
| 2019 | The Bird Game | Crow | Short film |
| 2020 | Love Is Love Is Love | Joanne | |
| 2021 | Resurrection | Claudia | |
| 2021 | Hardcore Halbert | Janet | Short film |
| 2025 | Tornado | Vienna Crawford | |
| 2026 | Every Moon Is Atrocious | Sophia | |

=== Television ===
| Year | Title | Role | Notes |
|---|---|---|---|
| 1973 | Life and Soul | Young Jacqueline | ITV television film |
| 1974 | Coronation Street | Pamela Graham | 2 episodes |
| 1975 | Joby | Molly MacLeod | 2 episodes |
| 1976 | Crown Court | Janice Scott | Episode: "The Right of Every Woman: Part 2" |
| 1976 | How We Used to Live | Marjorie Dawson | 3 episodes (series 2) |
| 1976 | Coronation Street | Customer | 1 episode |
| 1977 | Emmerdale Farm | Angela Read | 6 episodes |
| 1978 | The One and Only Phyllis Dixey | Doris | ITV television film |
| 1978 | Crown Court | Linda Mason | 3 episodes: "A Man with Everything: Parts 1–3" |
| 1979 | How We Used to Live | Sarah Hughes | 17 episodes (series 3) |
| 1979 | Omnibus | Madge | Episode: "Words Fail Me" |
| 1979 | Omnibus | Little Red Riding Hood | Episode: "The Brothers Grimm" |
| 1980 | ITV Playhouse | Lindsey | Episode: "Too Close to the Edge" |
| 1980 | Juliet Bravo | Maureen Maskell | Episode: "Shot Gun" |
| 1980 | Scene | Evelyn | Episode: "And Mum Came Too" |
| 1980 | Making a Living | Linda | 5 episodes |
| 1980–1981 | Coming Home | Travel Agent | 2 episodes |
| 1981 | The Gaffer | Nancy | Episode: "The Trouble with Women" |
| 1981 | L.S. Lowry – A Private View | (unknown) | ITV television film |
| 1981 | Noddy | Mary | ITV television film |
| 1982 | A Kind of Loving | Ingrid Rothwell (later Brown) | ITV miniseries; main role, 8 episodes |
| 1982 | The Gentle Touch | Dany | Episode: "Dany" |
| 1983 | Bergerac | Christine Bolton | Episode: "Always Leave Them Laughing" |
| 1983 | Reilly, Ace of Spies | Ulla | Episode: "The Visiting Fireman" |
| 1984 | A Christmas Carol | Fan | CBS television film |
| 1985 | Edge of Darkness | Emma Craven | BBC miniseries; 5 episodes |
| 1986 | Hold the Back Page | Laura Fox | Episode: "Jobs for the Girls" |
| 1986 | The Singing Detective | Nurse Mills | BBC miniseries; 6 episodes |
| 1987 | Screen Two | Jackie | Episode: "Will You Love Me Tomorrow?" |
| 1990 | A TV Dante | Beatrice | Channel 4 miniseries; 4 episodes; as Joanne Whalley-Kilmer |
| 1994 | Scarlett | Scarlett O'Hara | CBS miniseries; lead role; as Joanne Whalley-Kilmer |
| 2000 | Run the Wild Fields | Ruby Miller | Showtime original television film |
| 2000 | Jackie Bouvier Kennedy Onassis | Jackie Bouvier Kennedy Onassis | CBS television film |
| 2003 | 40 | Jess | Channel 4 miniseries; 3 episodes |
| 2005 | Criminal Minds | Karen Donovan | Episode: "Extreme Aggressor"; uncredited role |
| 2005 | The Virgin Queen | Queen Mary | BBC miniseries; 1 episode |
| 2005 | Child of Mine | Tess Palmer | ITV television film |
| 2006 | Justice League Unlimited | Emerald Empress and other voices | Episode: "Far from Home" |
| 2007 | Life Line | Katy Alder | BBC television film |
| 2008 | Unknown Sender | Carolyn | Internet TV series. Episode: "If You're Seeing This Tape..." |
| 2009 | Diverted | Marion Price | CBC television film |
| 2011–2012 | Gossip Girl | Princess Sophie Grimaldi | 7 episodes (seasons 4 & 5) |
| 2011–2013 | The Borgias | Vanozza Cattaneo | Main role, 25 episodes (seasons 1–3) |
| 2013 | The Challenger | Gweneth Feynman | BBC television film (U.S. title: The Challenger Disaster) |
| 2014 | Jamaica Inn | Aunt Patience | BBC miniseries; 3 episodes |
| 2015 | Wolf Hall | Katherine of Aragon | 3 episodes (series 1) |
| 2015 | The Ark | Emmie | BBC television film |
| 2015 | A.D. The Bible Continues | Claudia, wife of Pontius Pilate | Main role, 12 episodes |
| 2016 | Beowulf: Return to the Shieldlands | Rheda | Main role, 13 episodes |
| 2017 | The White Princess | Margaret, Duchess of Burgundy | Starz miniseries; 6 episodes |
| 2018 | Daredevil | Sister Maggie | Main role, 9 episodes (season 3) |
| 2020 | Tin Star | Mary James | 6 episodes (season 3) |
| 2022–2023 | Willow | Queen Sorsha | Disney+ sequel series; 3 episodes |
| 2023 | Carnival Row | Leonora | 9 episodes (season 2) |
| 2025 | The Rumour | Bea | 5 episodes |
