= Anthony Welsh =

English actor

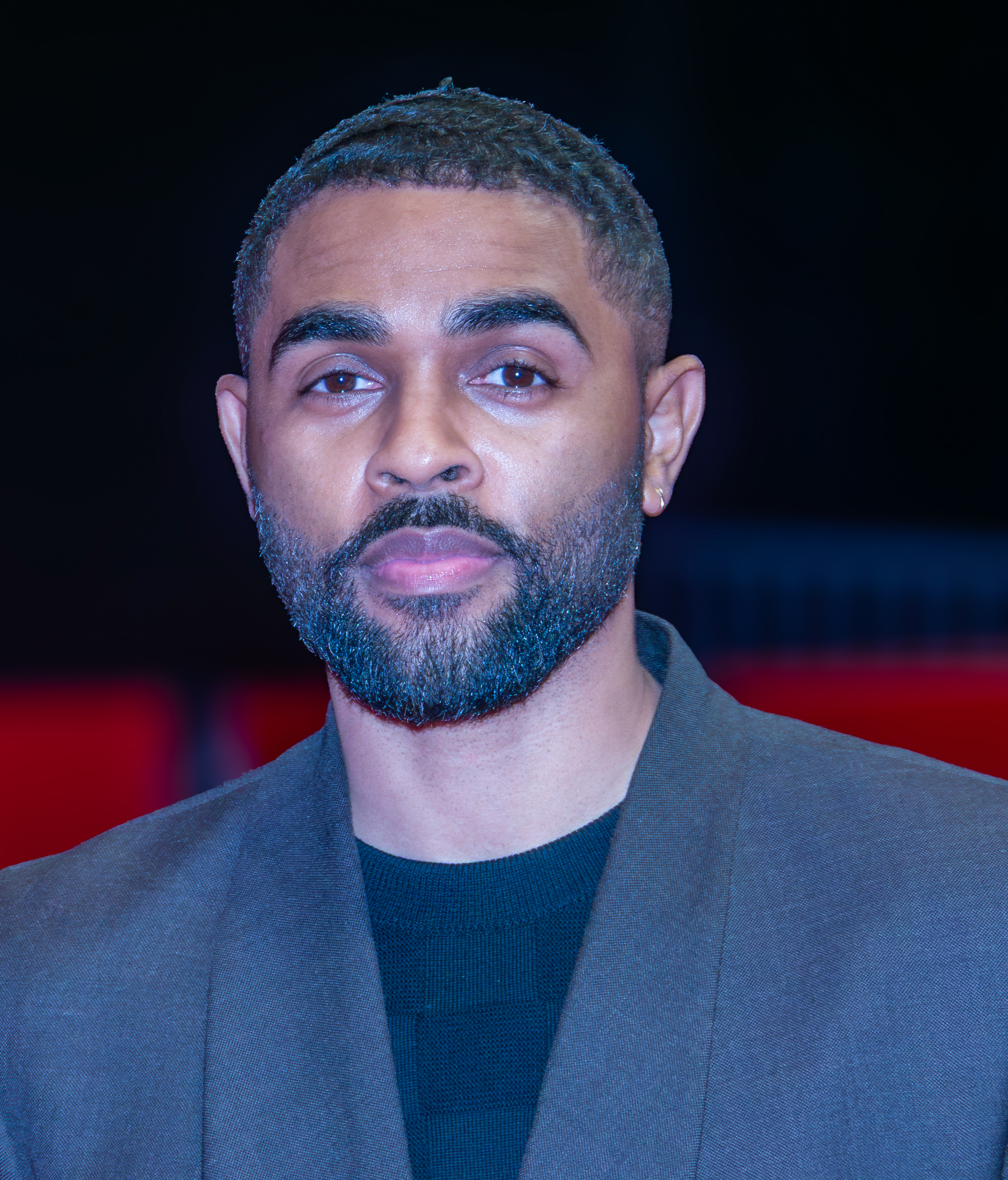
- Welsh in 2026
- Born: Anthony Michael Welsh; 5 July 1983 (age 43); Hammersmith, London, England
- Education: London Academy of Music and Dramatic Art
- Occupation: Actor
- Years active: 2008–present

Anthony Michael Welsh (born 5 July 1983) is an English actor. He made his film debut in Red Tails (2012). On television, he is known for his role as Lucky Gordon in The Trial of Christine Keeler (2019–2020).

== Early life and education ==
Welsh was born at Queen Charlotte's and Chelsea Hospital in the Hammersmith area of West London and grew up in West Ealing. He attended Drayton Manor High School. He began taking evening acting classes at Richmond Drama School when he was about 20 followed by a foundation course. He went on to train at the London Academy of Music and Dramatic Art (LAMDA).

== Filmography ==
=== Film ===
Year	Title	Role	Notes
2012	Red Tails	St. Lou	
2012	My Brother the Devil	Izzi	
2012	Comes a Bright Day	Elliot	
2012	AfterGlow	Trumpet	Short film
2013	Starred Up	Hassan	
2013	Dirtymoney	Leo Roberts	
2014	Second Coming	Levi	
2016	The Girl with All the Gifts	Dillon	
2017	Sand Castle	Carter	
2017	Journeyman	Andre Bryte	
2018	Barber Shop Chronicles	Winston / Shoni	National Theatre Live
2018	Ibiza	Peter	
2018	The Arrival	Emil	Short film
2018	Seed	Omar	Short film
2019	Calm With Horses	Rob	
2019	The Personal History of David Copperfield	Ham	
2024	Bob Marley: One Love	Don Taylor	
2025	Pillion	Darren	
2026	Dust	Aaron	

=== Television ===
Year	Title	Role	Notes
2009–2010	The Bill	Devon Marshall	3 episodes
2011	Holby City	Tim Dunning	Episode: "Too Much Monkey Business"
2011	Coming Up	Abdel	Episode: "Home"
2011	Top Boy	Shaun	1 episode
2011	Life's Too Short	BBC director	Mockumentary; 1 episode
2012	Secrets and Words	Sam	Episode: "A Study in Time"
2014	The Secret	Dean	Episode: "The Visitor"
2016	Fleabag	Jack	2 episodes
2017	Black Mirror	Anan Akhand	Episode: "Crocodile"
2018	Leading Lady Parts	Panelist	TV short
2019–2020	The Trial of Christine Keeler	Lucky Gordon	Miniseries
2019	Pure	Joe	Main role
2019–2020	Brassic	Jake	7 episodes
2020	Hanna	Leo Garner	Recurring role (season 2; 8 episodes)
2021	Master of None	Darius	2 episodes
2021	The Great	Father Basil	Recurring role (season 2; 5 episodes)
2022	The Flatshare	Leon Twomey	Main role
2023	The Gallows Pole	Abe Oldfield	Three-part television series

=== Video games ===
Year	Title	Role	Notes
2012	Forza Horizon	Ali Howard	

=== Music videos ===
Song	Year	Artist	Notes
"Another Hole in Babylon"	2016	Gaika Tavares	

== Stage ==
Year	Title	Role	Notes
2008	The Brothers Size	Elegba	Young Vic, London
2009	Pornography		Tricycle Theatre, London
2010	Sucker Punch	Troy	Royal Court Theatre, London
2010	Lower Ninth	E-Z	Donmar Warehouse / Trafalgar Studios, London
2011	Precious Little Talent	Sam	Trafalgar Studios, London
2012	Blackta	Brown	Young Vic, London
2013	nut	Devon	The Shed, Royal National Theatre, London
2014	dirty butterfly	Jason	Young Vic, London
2014	The Merchant of Venice	Gratiano	Almeida Theatre, London
2017	Barber Shop Chronicles	Winston / Shoni	Royal National Theatre, London
2018	The Brothers Size	Elegba	Young Vic, London
2024	The Comeuppance	Emilio	Almeida Theatre, London
