= Lewis Morley =

Photographer (1925–2013)

Lewis Morley OAM
- Born: Lewis Frederick Morley; 16 June 1925
- Died: 3 September 2013 (aged 88)
- Occupation: Photographer

Lewis Frederick Morley OAM (16 June 1925 – 3 September 2013) was a photographer.

== Biography ==
Morley was born in Hong Kong to English and Chinese parents and interned in Stanley Internment Camp during the Japanese occupation of Hong Kong between 1941 and 1945. When he was released he emigrated to the United Kingdom with his family. He studied at Twickenham Art School for three years, and spent time as a painter in Paris in the 1950s.

Perhaps best known for his photographs of Christine Keeler and Joe Orton, Morley began his career with assignments for magazines such as Tatler. He was also a successful theatre photographer for over 100 West End productions. His publicity photographs for the Beyond the Fringe revue (1961) included a study of the cast Peter Cook, Dudley Moore, Alan Bennett and Jonathan Miller which was used for the best-selling LP Cover of the show.

Morley emigrated to Australia in 1971 with his wife Patricia and son Lewis, where he lived in the inner west of Sydney. He did studio and commercial work photographing architecture and food in magazines such as Belle, and worked with interior designers and stylists such as Babette Hayes, and Charmaine Solomon until his retirement in 1987. In 1989 he collaborated with photographs curator Terence Pepper in staging his first museum retrospective at London's National Portrait Gallery and subsequently donated all the images printed for the exhibition as part of a larger archive of his work. His first autobiography Black and White Lies was published in 1992.

In the mid 1990s, Morley ventured into the gallery business when he opened the Lewis Morley Photographers Showcase. The gallery presented the work of a variety of local photographers from a range of genres.

In 1999, Lewis Morley appeared in the Contemporary Australian Photographers series. It was followed in 2003 with the release of a film about his life and an exhibition Myself and Eye at the National Portrait Gallery in Canberra.

In 2006, an extensive exhibition showcasing 50 years of Lewis Morley work was displayed at the Art Gallery of New South Wales. Titled Lewis Morley: 50 Years of Photography, the exhibition included 150 of his works covering fashion, theatre, and reportage, many of which had never been seen before.

Morley died in September 2013 aged 88. His archive was subsequently donated to the National Media Museum in Bradford, England.

=== The Keeler chair ===
At the height of the Profumo affair in 1963, Christine Keeler sat for a photographic portrait by Morley. The photoshoot, at his studio on the first floor of The Establishment nightclub, was to promote a film, The Keeler Affair, that was never released in the United Kingdom. Keeler was reluctant to pose in the nude, but the film producers insisted. Morley persuaded Keeler to sit astride a plywood chair so that, while technically nude, the back of the chair would obscure most of her body. Keeler told cartoon historian Tim Benson in 2007 that she was not nude and was wearing knickers during the entire photoshoot.

The particular chair used is in the Victoria and Albert Museum. Before donating it, Morley inscribed the underside with the names of his famous sitters who had sat on it, including Joe Orton, Sir David Frost and 'Dame Edna Everage'. The photo propelled Arne Jacobsen's Model 3107 chair to prominence, even though the chair used was an imitation of the Model 3107, with a hand-hold aperture cut out of the back to avoid copyright infringement.
