= Peter Rachman =

Polish property mogul (1919–1962)

- Born: Perec Rachman; 16 August 1919; Lwów, Poland
- Died: 29 November 1962 (aged 43); Edgware, London, England
- Resting place: Bushey Jewish Cemetery
- Occupations: Landlord, property developer
- Spouse: Audrey O'Donnell (m. 1960)
- Military career
- Allegiance: Poland
- Branch: Polish Armed Forces in the West
- Service years: 1941–1948
- Unit: II Corps
- Conflicts: World War II

Perec "Peter" Rachman (16 August 1919 – 29 November 1962) was a Polish-born landlord who operated in Notting Hill, London in the 1950s and early 1960s. He became notorious for his exploitation of his tenants, with the word "Rachmanism" entering the Oxford English Dictionary as a synonym for the exploitation and intimidation of tenants.

== Early life and World War II ==
Rachman was born in Lwów (then part of Poland, now Lviv, Ukraine) in 1919, the son of Jewish parents. His father was a dentist. After the German invasion of Poland in 1939, Rachman may have joined the Polish resistance. He was first interned by the Germans and, after escaping across the Soviet border, was reinterned in a Soviet labour camp in Siberia and cruelly treated. After the Germans invaded the Soviet Union in 1941, Rachman and other Polish prisoners joined the II Polish Corps and fought with the Allies in the Middle East and Italy. After the war, he stayed with his unit as an occupation force in Italy until 1946 when it transferred to Britain. Rachman was demobilised in 1948 and became a British resident.

== Business career ==
Rachman began his career by working for an estate agent in Shepherd's Bush. By 1957, he had built up a property empire in west London, consisting of more than a hundred run-down mansion blocks and several nightclubs. His office was at 91–93 Westbourne Grove, in Bayswater, and the first house he purchased and used for multi-occupation was nearby in the run-down, St Stephen's Gardens, W2. In adjacent areas in Notting Hill (W11) and North Kensington (W10), including Powis Square, Powis Gardens, Powis Terrace, Colville Road and Colville Terrace, he also subdivided large properties into flats and let rooms, initially often for prostitution. Much of this area, south of Westbourne Park Road, having become derelict, was compulsorily purchased by Westminster City Council in the late 1960s and was demolished in 1973–74 to make way for the Wessex Gardens estate.

According to his biographer, Shirley Green, Rachman moved the protected tenants into a smaller concentration of properties or bought them out to minimise the number of tenancies with statutory rent controls. Houses were also subdivided into a number of flats to increase the number of tenancies without rent controls. Rachman filled the properties with recent migrants from the West Indies. Rachman's initial reputation, which he sought to promote in the media, was as someone who could help to find and provide accommodation for immigrants, but he was massively overcharging these West Indian tenants, as they did not have the same protection under the law as had the previous tenants.

By 1958, he had largely moved out of slumlord-landlordism into property development, but his former henchmen, including the equally notorious Michael de Freitas (aka Michael X/Abdul Malik), who created a reputation for himself as a black-power leader, and Johnny Edgecombe, who became a promoter of jazz and blues music, helped to keep him in the limelight. A special police unit was set up to investigate Rachman in 1959 and uncovered a complex network of 33 companies he had set up to control his property empire. They also discovered Rachman was involved in prostitution, and he was prosecuted twice for brothel-keeping. At the time, he lived in Hampstead, and was using a chauffeur-driven Rolls-Royce.

In 1960, after Ronnie Kray was imprisoned for 18 months for running a protection racket and related threats, his brother Reggie approached Rachman with a business proposition. Rachman would buy properties for the Krays and they would take a percentage from the rentals as "protection". Rachman realised this was a ruse by the Krays to slowly take over his property empire and made them a counter offer, to run a central London nightclub Rachman owned. When the Krays agreed, they took over Esmeralda's Barn in Knightsbridge (now the location of the Berkeley Hotel). By giving the Krays a club, Rachman knew they had got what they wanted and they would leave him alone.

Rachman did not achieve general notoriety until after his death, when the Profumo affair of 1963 hit the headlines and it emerged that both Christine Keeler and Mandy Rice-Davies had been his mistresses and that he had owned the mews house in Marylebone where Rice-Davies and Keeler had briefly stayed. As full details of his criminal activities were revealed, there was a call for new legislation to prevent such practices, led by Ben Parkin, MP for Paddington North, who coined the term "Rachmanism". The Rent Act 1965 gave security of tenure to tenants in privately rented properties.

== In popular culture ==
The 1989 single "Sheriff Fatman" by Carter the Unstoppable Sex Machine, which rails against slum landlords and their intimidatory tactics used against tenants, mentions Rachman in the lyrics:

There's bats in the belfry. The windows are jammed.
The toilets ain't healthy. He don't give a damn.
Just chuckles and smiles. Laughs like a madman.
A born again Rachman. Here comes Sheriff Fatman.

Rachman's practices are also said to be one of the inspirations for the song "Get 'Em Out By Friday" (1972) by progressive rock band Genesis.

Rachman's life served as the basis for Peter Flannery's play "Singer" about the rise and fall of Holocaust survivor turned slumlord, Peter Singer. While the play is inspired by Rachman's life, it takes many creative liberties, turning it into a tragic dramedy.

The character Sandor Kovaks in the 2008 novel The Clothes on their Backs by Linda Grant is inspired by and based on Peter Rachman.

Rachman is a character in the second of Alan Moore's Long London series, I Hear A New World.

== Personal life and death ==
Rachman was denied British citizenship. As his home city was transferred from Poland to the Ukrainian Soviet Socialist Republic (part of the Soviet Union) in February 1946, he became stateless.

Rachman married his long-standing girlfriend Audrey O'Donnell in March 1960 but remained a compulsive womaniser, maintaining Mandy Rice-Davies as his mistress at 1 Bryanston Mews West, W1, where he had previously briefly installed Christine Keeler. After suffering two heart attacks back-to-back, Peter Rachman died in Edgware General Hospital on 29 November 1962, aged 43. He was buried at the Bushey Jewish Cemetery in Bushey, Hertfordshire.
