= Johnny Edgecombe =

British jazz promoter (1932–2010)

- Born: John Arthur Alexander Edgecombe; 22 October 1932; St. John's, Antigua and Barbuda
- Died: 26 September 2010 (aged 77); London, England
- Occupation: Jazz promoter
- Known for: Profumo affair

John Arthur Alexander Edgecombe (22 October 1932 – 26 September 2010) was a West Indies-born British jazz promoter and petty criminal, whose involvement with Christine Keeler inadvertently alerted authorities to the Profumo affair.

== Early life ==
Edgecombe was born on 22 October 1932 in St. John's, Antigua and Barbuda, the youngest of eight children. He often accompanied his father on his schooner running petrol from Trinidad to Antigua. In 1942, his father abandoned his family by moving to New York City, took United States citizenship and disappeared.

In 1947, the young Edgecombe worked his passage aboard a British ship carrying sugar to Liverpool. From there he moved to Cardiff, where he stayed for some years in Tiger Bay, lodging at a mission house for seamen. In 1950, searching for his missing father, Edgecombe stowed away on a ship bound for Texas, but on arrival in Galveston he was arrested by the local authorities and put back on board for the return trip. When he docked in Britain, the magistrates jailed him for 28 days as a stowaway. After leaving prison, he made his way to London, where he became involved in petty crime, at one point serving three months in prison for an attempted jewel theft. He ran a drinking and drugs den in premises rented from Peter Rachman, and reportedly acted as a pimp to Rachman's girlfriend.

== Profumo scandal ==
It was in this "shebeen" in 1954 that Edgecombe first encountered Lucky Gordon, who threatened to tip off the police about the drinking den unless Edgecombe paid weekly "protection money". After a few months, Edgecombe closed down his shebeen, and moved into the jazz scene, making a living by driving musicians to gigs, and dealing small quantities of cannabis.

In September 1962, Edgecombe met a nightclub hostess, Christine Keeler, and temporarily moved into her flat in Sheffield Terrace. Keeler was involved with several men, and it was this web of relationships and jealousy that triggered the events that led to what became known as the Profumo affair. Keeler told Edgecombe that Gordon had assaulted her and held her captive at his flat for two days after she ended their relationship. Edgecombe confronted Gordon with a knife in the Flamingo Club on the evening of 27 October 1962, and Gordon required 17 stitches in the face. Edgecombe asked Keeler to help him find a solicitor before surrendering to the police, but she refused and said that she would give evidence against him.

On 14 December 1962, Edgecombe took a taxi to the Marylebone home of osteopath Stephen Ward, where Keeler was in hiding along with friend Mandy Rice-Davies. When she refused to come out, he fired at least five shots at the front door with a semi-automatic pistol in an unsuccessful attempt to shoot out the lock on the door. He fled from the scene before the police arrived, but was arrested later that evening. His subsequent arrest set in motion the unravelling of Keeler's relationship with Secretary of State for War John Profumo and Russian naval attaché Yevgeny Ivanov, with Keeler's non-appearance at his trial at the Old Bailey courthouse in March 1963 finally giving the British press the excuse it needed to publish the story.

On 15 March 1963, Edgecombe was acquitted of assaulting Gordon, but was convicted and sentenced to seven years for possession of a firearm with the intent to endanger life. He served five years before being paroled.

On his release in 1967, Edgecombe became a jazz promoter, running a club called Edges, and worked as a film and television extra. In 1987, he made an extended appearance on an edition of the live television discussion programme After Dark alongside Tony Blackburn, Peter Tatchell, Victoria Gillick and others. Edgecombe also appeared briefly in the 1989 TV documentary The Scandal Story where he described and reenacted the shooting incident outside the actual Marylebone house.

He wrote and published his version of events of the Profumo Affair in a book titled Black Scandal in 2002. He died of lung cancer and kidney cancer in London, aged 77, on 26 September 2010.

== Cultural references ==
- In the 1989 film Scandal, Edgecombe was portrayed by singer Roland Gift.
- Edgecombe was portrayed by Wayne Robinson in Andrew Lloyd Webber's stage musical Stephen Ward the Musical, which opened at the Aldwych Theatre on 19 December 2013.
- He was portrayed by Nathan Stewart-Jarrett in the 2019 British TV drama The Trial of Christine Keeler.
