= Mandy Rice-Davies =

Welsh model and showgirl (1944–2014)

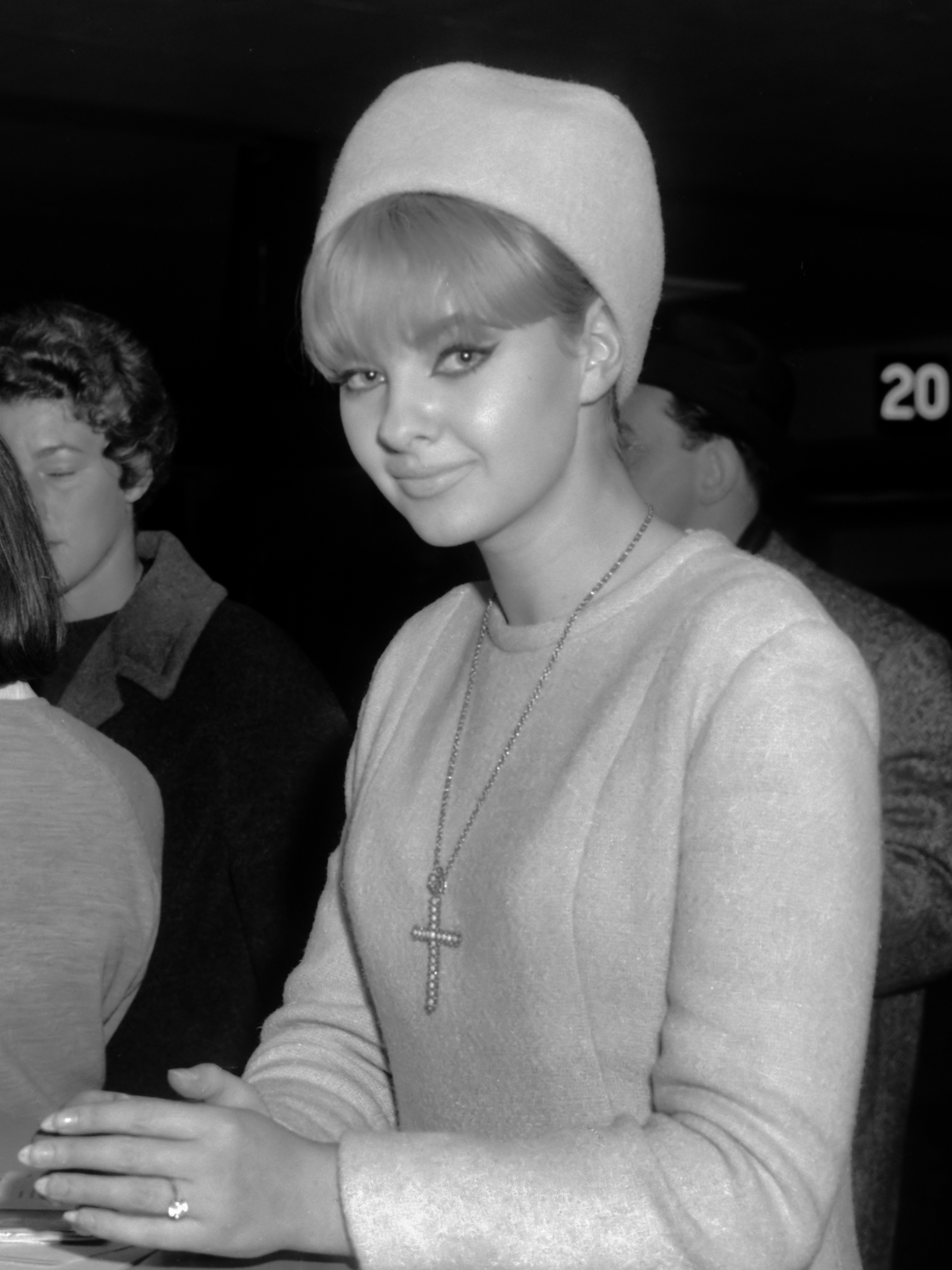
- Rice-Davies in 1964
- Born: Marilyn Rice-Davies; 21 October 1944; Pontyates, Carmarthenshire, Wales
- Died: 18 December 2014 (aged 70); London, England
- Occupations: Model; showgirl
- Known for: Profumo affair
- Spouses: Rafael Shauli (m. 1966; div. 1971) Charles LeFevre (m. 1978; div. 1978) Ken Foreman (1988–2014)
- Children: 1

Marilyn Foreman (21 October 1944 – 18 December 2014), better known as Mandy Rice-Davies, was a Welsh model and showgirl best known for her association with Christine Keeler and her role in the Profumo affair, which discredited the Conservative government of British Prime Minister Harold Macmillan in 1963.

== Early life ==
Rice-Davies was born in Pontyates, near Llanelli, Wales, and, during her childhood, moved to Solihull, Warwickshire. Her father was a policeman before becoming a technologist for Dunlop Rubber, and her mother was a former actress. She attended Sharmans Cross Secondary Modern School. As a teenager she worked at Woods Farm in Shirley assisting with the horse yard there. She appeared older than her age and at 15 she got a Saturday job as a clothes model at the Marshall & Snelgrove department store in Birmingham. At 16 she went to London as Miss Austin at the Earls Court Motor Show.

== Profumo scandal ==
At Murray's Cabaret Club she met Christine Keeler, who introduced her to her friend, the well-connected osteopath Stephen Ward, and to an ex-lover, the slum landlord Peter Rachman. Rice-Davies became Rachman's mistress and was set up in the house in which he had previously kept Keeler, 1 Bryanston Mews West, Marylebone. Rice-Davies often visited Keeler at the house she shared with Ward at Wimpole Mews, Marylebone, and, after Keeler had moved elsewhere, lived there herself, between September and December 1962.

On 14 December 1962, while Keeler was visiting Rice-Davies at Wimpole Mews, one of Keeler's boyfriends, John Edgecombe, attempted to enter and fired a gun several times at the door. His trial brought attention to the girls' involvement with Ward's social set, and intimacy with many powerful people, including Viscount Astor at whose home of Cliveden Keeler met the War Minister John Profumo. Profumo's brief relationship with Keeler was the centre of the affair that caused him to resign from the government in June 1963, though Rice-Davies herself never met him.

=== "Well he would, wouldn't he?" ===
Stephen Ward was found guilty of living on the earnings of prostitution, from money obtained from Rice-Davies and Keeler among others, at a trial instigated after the embarrassment caused to the government.

While being cross-examined at Ward's committal hearing, when James Burge, the defence counsel, pointed out that Lord Astor denied an affair or even having met her, she dispatched this swiftly with pert humour: "Well he would, wouldn't he?" Often misquoted in other contexts as: "Well he would say that, wouldn't he?", by 1979, this phrase had entered the third edition of the Oxford Dictionary of Quotations, and is occasionally referred to with the abbreviation MRDA ("Mandy Rice-Davies applies").

== Later life ==
A Private Eye cover at the time of Profumo had a photograph of "the lovely" Rice-Davies with the caption (without any headline or other identification), "Do you mind? If it wasn't for me – you couldn't have cared less about Rachman". Rice-Davies released a 45 EP on the Ember label (EMB EP 4537) in May 1964 entitled Introducing Mandy, which included cover versions of songs such as "All I Do Is Dream of You" and "You Got What It Takes".

Rice-Davies traded on the notoriety the trial brought her, comparing herself to Horatio Nelson's mistress, Lady Hamilton. In 1965 she was an associate of pre-fame David Bowie, attending his rehearsals and live performances. In 1966 she married an Israeli businessman, Rafi Shauli and moved to Israel. The couple had one daughter together and Rice-Davies converted to Judaism. She also opened nightclubs and restaurants in Tel Aviv.

In 1980, with Shirley Flack, Rice-Davies wrote her autobiography, Mandy. A year later she appeared in the Tom Stoppard play, Dirty Linen and New-Found-Land. In 1989, she wrote a novel entitled The Scarlet Thread. The Ottoman Empire provided the backdrop and the novel was described as a stirring wartime saga in the spirit of Gone with the Wind. Subsequently, journalist Libby Purves, who had met Rice-Davies when Mandy was published, invited her to join a female re-creation on the River Thames of Jerome K. Jerome's comic novel Three Men in a Boat.

This expedition was commissioned by Alan Coren for the magazine Punch, the other members of the party being cartoonist Merrily Harpur and a toy Alsatian to represent Montmorency, the dog in the original story. Purves recounted how she "immediately spotted that this Rice-Davies was a woman to go up the Amazon with" and, among other things, that "only Mandy's foxy charm saved us from being evicted from a lock for being drunk on pink Champagne."

Rice-Davies appeared in television and film productions, including Absolutely Fabulous and episode 6 of the first series of Chance in a Million. Her film career included roles in Nana, the True Key of Pleasure (1982), Black Venus (1983) and Absolute Beginners (1986) as the mother of Colin, whose father was played by Ray Davies. In the 1989 film Scandal, about the Profumo affair, Bridget Fonda portrayed Rice-Davies alongside Joanne Whalley as Keeler.

She was closely involved in the development of Andrew Lloyd Webber's musical Stephen Ward about Ward's involvement in the Profumo affair, in which she was portrayed by Charlotte Blackledge. The musical opened on 19 December 2013 at the Aldwych Theatre. On Radio 4's Midweek on 5 February 2014, Rice-Davies said of Stephen Ward, "I didn't fall for him, but I did have an affair with him." She once described her life as "one slow descent into respectability".

== Illness and death ==
Rice-Davies died from lung cancer, aged 70, on 18 December 2014 in London.

== In popular culture ==
Rice-Davies is played by Bridget Fonda in Scandal, a 1989 film about the Profumo affair.

Rice-Davies portrayed herself in a dream sequence in episode 1 of Series 2 of the British sitcom Absolutely Fabulous. Also in the episode, character Patsy Stone compares her demeanor to Rice-Davies's demeanor during the Profumo affair.

She is portrayed by Ellie Bamber in The Trial of Christine Keeler, a 2019–2020 six-part BBC One television series.

A minor character named Mandy Pryce-Morgan, in the novel The Plague Dogs by Richard Adams, is a satirical reference to her.
