= James Burge =

English barrister, inspiration for Rumpole of the Bailey (1906-1990)

James Burge QC

Charles George James Burge QC, QC (8 October 1906 – 6 September 1990) was an English criminal law barrister, remembered for his defence of Stephen Ward in the Profumo affair in 1963. He is also remembered as John Mortimer's original inspiration for the fictional barrister Horace Rumpole in Rumpole of the Bailey.

The son of George Burge, later of Masterton, New Zealand and stepson of Maude Burge, Burge was educated at Cheltenham College, then at Christ's College, Cambridge as an undergraduate commoner. He was called to the Bar from the Inner Temple in 1932. He practised in the chambers of R. E. Seaton, Q.C., an established "criminal set" in Queen Elizabeth Building, Temple, London. He succeeded Seaton as Prosecuting Counsel to the Post Office at the Central Criminal Court in 1943. During the Second World War, Burge reached the rank of squadron leader in the R.A.F.

In 1963, Burge defended Stephen Ward in the Profumo affair, in the course of which Ward was prosecuted for living on earnings from prostitution. Burge, known as a mercurial Old Bailey junior, never quite recovered from the professional consequences of defending him in the scandal. Ward took an overdose of sleeping tablets near the end of the trial, he was found guilty of some charges in his absence, but died without regaining consciousness. It was Burge to whom Mandy Rice-Davies made her famous reply "Well he would, wouldn't he?"

In 1965, Burge was appointed Queen's Counsel; he was made a bencher of the Inner Temple in 1971, and served as a recorder from 1972 to 1975.

Author and fellow barrister John Mortimer stated on several occasions that there were elements of Burge, especially Burge's independence and total dedication to often unprepossessing clients, that he incorporated into the famous fictional character Rumpole of the Bailey. Mortimer's 2009 obituary in The Daily Telegraph confirmed that Rumpole was, in part, based on a chance meeting in court with James Burge:

In the early 1970s Mortimer was appearing for some football hooligans when James Burge, with whom he was sharing the defence, told him: "I'm really an anarchist at heart, but I don't think even my darling old Prince Peter Kropotkin would have approved of this lot." "And there," Mortimer realised, "I had Rumpole."

He died at age 83, on 6 September 1990 and was cremated in Xàbia, Spain. He had married Elizabeth, daughter of Commander Scott Williams, R.N., of Dorset, in 1938; they had two sons and a daughter.

== Sources ==
- "Sir John Mortimer, creator of Rumpole of the Bailey" by Geoffrey Robertson guardian.co.uk, Friday 16 January 2009
- "BBC Four Film and Drama", Rumpole of the Bailey
