= Murray's Cabaret Club =

London cabaret club 1913 - 1975

Coordinates: 51.5121°N 0.1382°W

Murray's Cabaret Club was a cabaret club in Beak Street in Soho, central London, England.

== History ==
The club was first opened in 1913, on the site of the old Blanchards restaurant at 1-7 Beak Street, by an American, Jack Mays, and an Englishman, Ernest A. Cordell. The club was known for its scantily-clad showgirls and its association with Christine Keeler and the 1960s Profumo affair.

It was a members-only club providing food and drink for its wealthy patrons along with music, space to dance and other entertainment. The entertainments included demonstration dancing, tableaux and fashion parades. Bands such as the Versatile Four performed there. As well as following musical fashion trends, such as tango and jazz, the club also provided cabaret-style presentations. It was open into the early morning but also offered popular afternoon tea dances. It remained open during the First World War and continued to be popular in the interwar years, keeping up with trends to continue attracting a wealthy clientele. Its song and dance shows became more ambitious. Among the performers was Gertrude Lawrence in the chorus near the start of her career. In 1923 it was renovated and renamed Blanchard's. In the late 1930s, Murray's Club was re-opened at a different location, 16 -18 Beak Street.

In the 1950s Murray's had a total staff of 130, including 65 showgirls and understudies.

The club was run by Percival Murray, then later by his son David Murray. David Murray was a friend of Stephen Ward and spent weekends at Ward's cottage at Cliveden, where showgirl Christine Keeler was introduced to John Profumo. David ran the club until 1967 when he fell out with his father over proposals to introduce a gambling floor. The club eventually closed in 1975.

In 2018, Murray's was the subject of an exhibition mounted by the Museum of Soho in collaboration with poster dealer Charlie Jeffreys, and curator and historian Ben Levy. It featured costume designs by the illustrator Ronald Cobb along with a selection of club ephemera. The club location at 16–18 Beak Street is now a restaurant called "Mountain" which is owned and run by head chef Tomos Parry. Tomos Parry has a Michelin Star for his other restaurant, Brat.
