= Christine Keeler =

English model and showgirl (1942–2017)

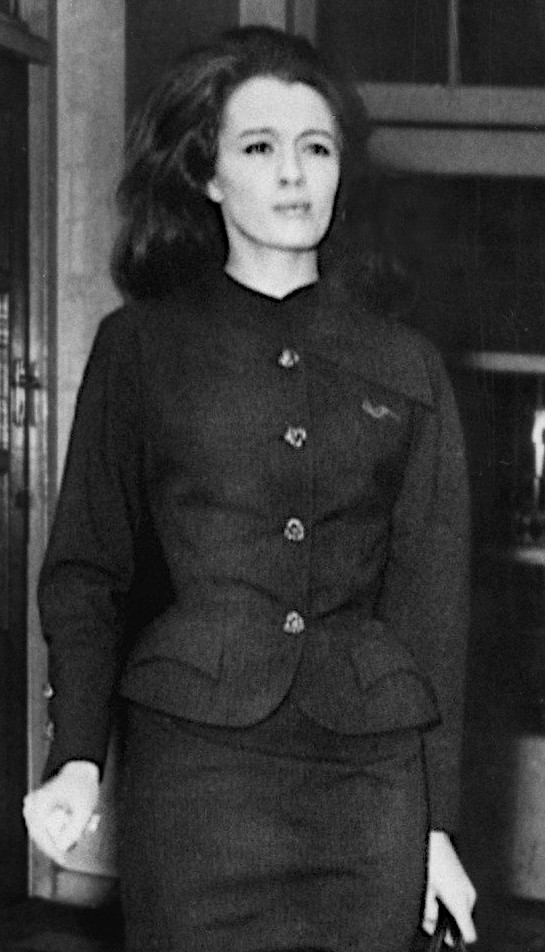
- Keeler in 1963
- Born: Christine Margaret Keeler; 22 February 1942; Uxbridge, Middlesex, England
- Died: 4 December 2017 (aged 75); London, England
- Other name: C.M. Sloane
- Occupations: Model; showgirl
- Known for: Profumo affair
- Criminal charges: Perjury; conspiracy to pervert the course of justice
- Criminal penalty: 9 months' imprisonment
- Criminal status: Released 8 June 1964
- Spouses: James Levermore (m. 1965; div. 1966) Anthony Platt (m. 1971; div. 1977)
- Children: 3
- Website: christine-keeler.co.uk

Christine Margaret Keeler (22 February 1942 – 4 December 2017) was an English model and showgirl. She became involved in a major political scandal that became known as the Profumo affair.

Her meeting at a dance club with society osteopath Stephen Ward drew her into fashionable circles. At the height of the Cold War, she became sexually involved with the British Secretary of State for War John Profumo, as well as with Soviet military attaché Yevgeny Ivanov. A shooting incident involving a third lover caused the press to investigate her, revealing how her affairs could threaten national security. In the House of Commons, Profumo denied any improper conduct but later admitted to having lied.

This incident discredited the Conservative government of Harold Macmillan in 1963, in what became known as the Profumo affair. Keeler was alleged to have been a prostitute, which was not a criminal offence. Ward was, however, found guilty of being her pimp. He took an overdose of drugs and died before conviction. Critics have described the trial as a miscarriage of justice orchestrated by forces of the UK establishment in revenge for embarrassment of the incident.

Keeler served six months' imprisonment after conviction on a perjury charge, and afterwards wrote books explaining her side of events.

== Biography ==
=== Early years ===
Keeler was born in Uxbridge, Middlesex, in 1942. Her father, Colin Sean Keeler (later known as Colin King, 1921–1976), abandoned the family in 1945. She was brought up by her mother, Julie Ellen (née Payne, 1923–2012), and stepfather, Edward Huish, in a house made from two converted railway carriages in the Berkshire village of Wraysbury. In 1951, at the age of nine, Keeler was sent to a holiday home in Littlehampton because the school health inspector said that she was suffering from malnutrition. She was sexually abused as a teenager both by her stepfather and his friends, for whom she babysat.

At the age of 15, she found work as a model at a dress shop in London's Soho. At the age of 17, she gave birth to a son after an affair with a United States Air Force sergeant; the child was born prematurely on 17 April 1959 and survived just six days.

That summer, Keeler left Wraysbury, staying briefly in Slough with a friend before going to London. She initially worked as a waitress at a restaurant on Baker Street, where she met Maureen O'Connor, who worked at Murray's Cabaret Club in Soho. O'Connor introduced Keeler to the owner, Percy Murray, who hired her almost immediately as a topless showgirl.

At Murray's, she met Stephen Ward, an osteopath and artist. His practice and art brought considerable social success and influential friends. The two soon lived together with the outward appearance of being a couple, but, according to her, it was a platonic, non-sexual relationship. In her autobiography, Secrets and Lies, Keeler claimed Ward was working as a double agent, having contact with both senior members of MI5 and the KGB, and was passing UK state secrets to the latter.

=== Profumo affair ===
On the weekend of 8–9 July 1961, Ward introduced Keeler to John Profumo, the Secretary of State for War, at a pool party at Cliveden, the Buckinghamshire mansion owned by the 3rd Viscount Astor. Profumo began a brief affair with Keeler, the exact length of which is disputed. It either ended in August 1961, after the security services warned Profumo of the possible dangers of mixing with the Ward circle, or it continued with decreasing fervour until December 1961. Among Ward's other friends, whom Profumo briefly met, was the Soviet naval attaché and GRU officer Yevgeny Ivanov. According to Keeler, she and Ivanov had a short sexual relationship.

After her relationship with Profumo ended, Keeler was sexually involved with several partners, including Jamaican jazz singer Lucky Gordon and Antiguan jazz promoter Johnny Edgecombe. There was considerable jealousy between the two men; in one quarrel on 27 October 1962, Edgecombe slashed Gordon's face with a knife. When Keeler ended the relationship with Edgecombe in December 1962, Edgecombe turned up at Ward's house in Wimpole Mews on 14 December, where she was temporarily seeking refuge, and fired five shots at the building. His arrest and subsequent trial brought Keeler to public attention and provided the impetus for a national scandal to develop. After initially denying any impropriety with Keeler, Profumo eventually confessed and resigned from the government and Parliament, causing great embarrassment to his government colleagues, who had previously supported him. These events, in the summer of 1963, brought Keeler notoriety; The Economist gave the headline "The Prime Minister's Crisis" alongside a picture of Keeler, with no further explanation. As late as June 2025, the BBC was maintaining the media interest in the affair.

=== Morley portrait ===
Lewis Morley's photographic portrait of Keeler astride an imitation Arne Jacobsen chair, 1963

At the height of the Profumo affair in 1963, Keeler sat for a photographic portrait by Lewis Morley. The photoshoot with Morley, at a studio on the first floor of Peter Cook's Establishment Club, was to promote a proposed film, The Keeler Affair, that was never released in the United Kingdom. Keeler was reluctant to pose in the nude, but the film producers insisted. Morley persuaded Keeler to sit astride a plywood chair so that, while technically nude, the back of the chair would obscure most of her body.

The photo propelled Arne Jacobsen's Model 3107 chair to prominence, even though the chair used was an imitation of the Model 3107, with a hand-hold aperture crudely cut out of the back to avoid copyright infringement. The differences in the designs of the chairs are readily apparent in a side-by-side photograph. The particular chair used is in the Victoria and Albert Museum.

=== Trials ===
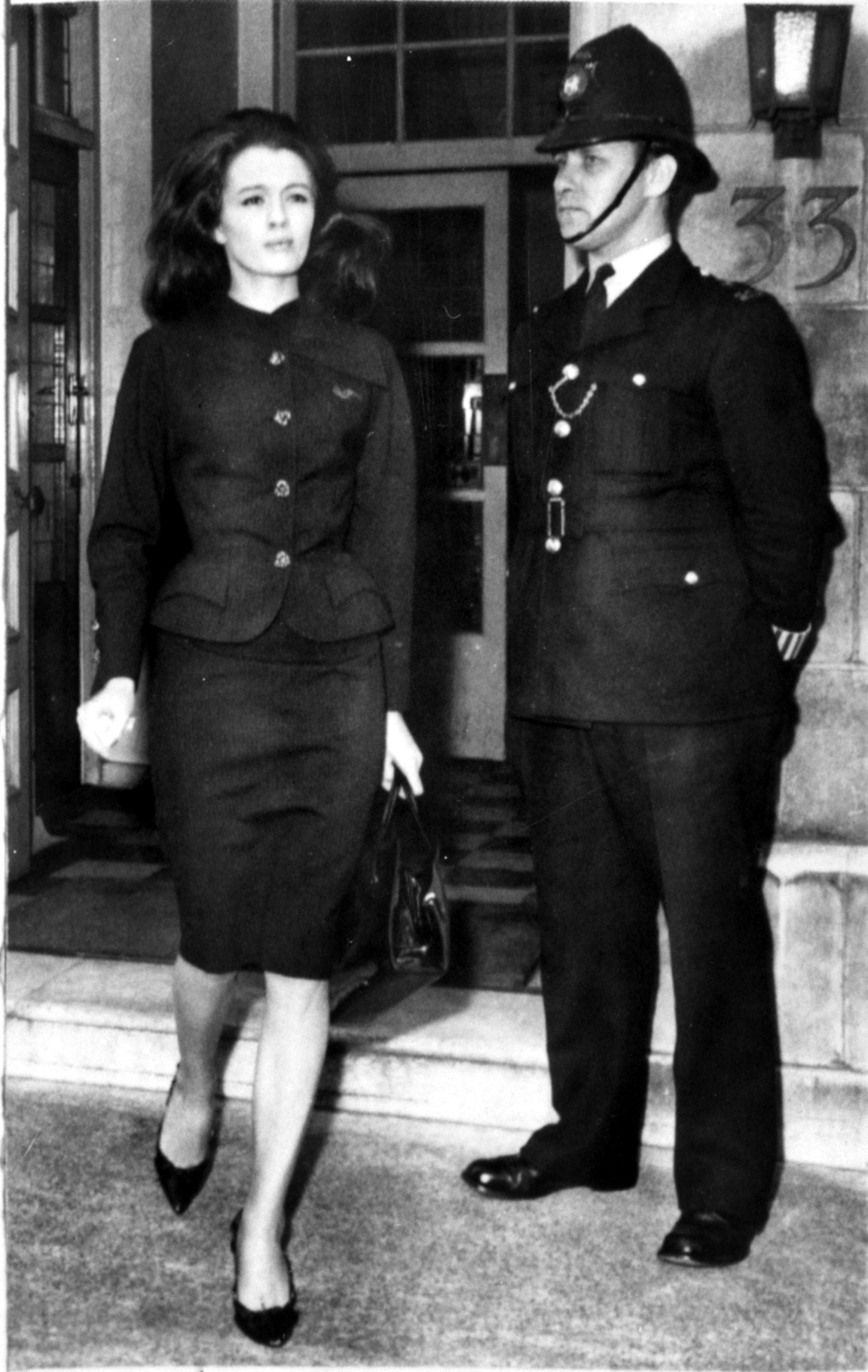
Keeler going to court in September 1963

On 18 April 1963, Keeler was attacked at a friend's home. She accused Lucky Gordon, who was arrested and charged. At his trial, which began on 5 June, he maintained that his innocence would be established by two witnesses who, the police told the court, could not be found. On 7 June, principally on the evidence of Keeler, Gordon was found guilty and sentenced to three years imprisonment. By this time, Ward was facing trial on vice charges, and Keeler was again a main prosecution witness.

Ward's trial, which ran 22–31 July 1963, has been characterised as "an act of political revenge" for the embarrassment caused to the government. He was accused of living off immoral earnings earned through Keeler and Mandy Rice-Davies based on the small contributions to household expenses or loan repayments the two had made to Ward while living with him. Ward's professional earnings as an osteopath were a substantial £5,500 a year (£102,700 in 2025) at the time these small payments were made. After a hostile summing-up from the trial judge, Ward was convicted, but took an overdose of barbiturates and died before the jury returned its verdict and sentence could be passed. In the closing days of Ward's trial, Gordon's assault conviction was overturned by the Court of Appeal when his missing witnesses were found and testified that the evidence given by Keeler was substantially false. In December 1963, Keeler pleaded guilty to charges of perjury before Sir Anthony Hawke, the Recorder of London, and was sentenced to nine months' imprisonment, serving six months in prison. Her cellmate while in prison was Elizabeth Crowley, the wife of East End bank robber William Crowley; they were the maternal grandparents of Labour MP Wes Streeting.

=== Later life ===
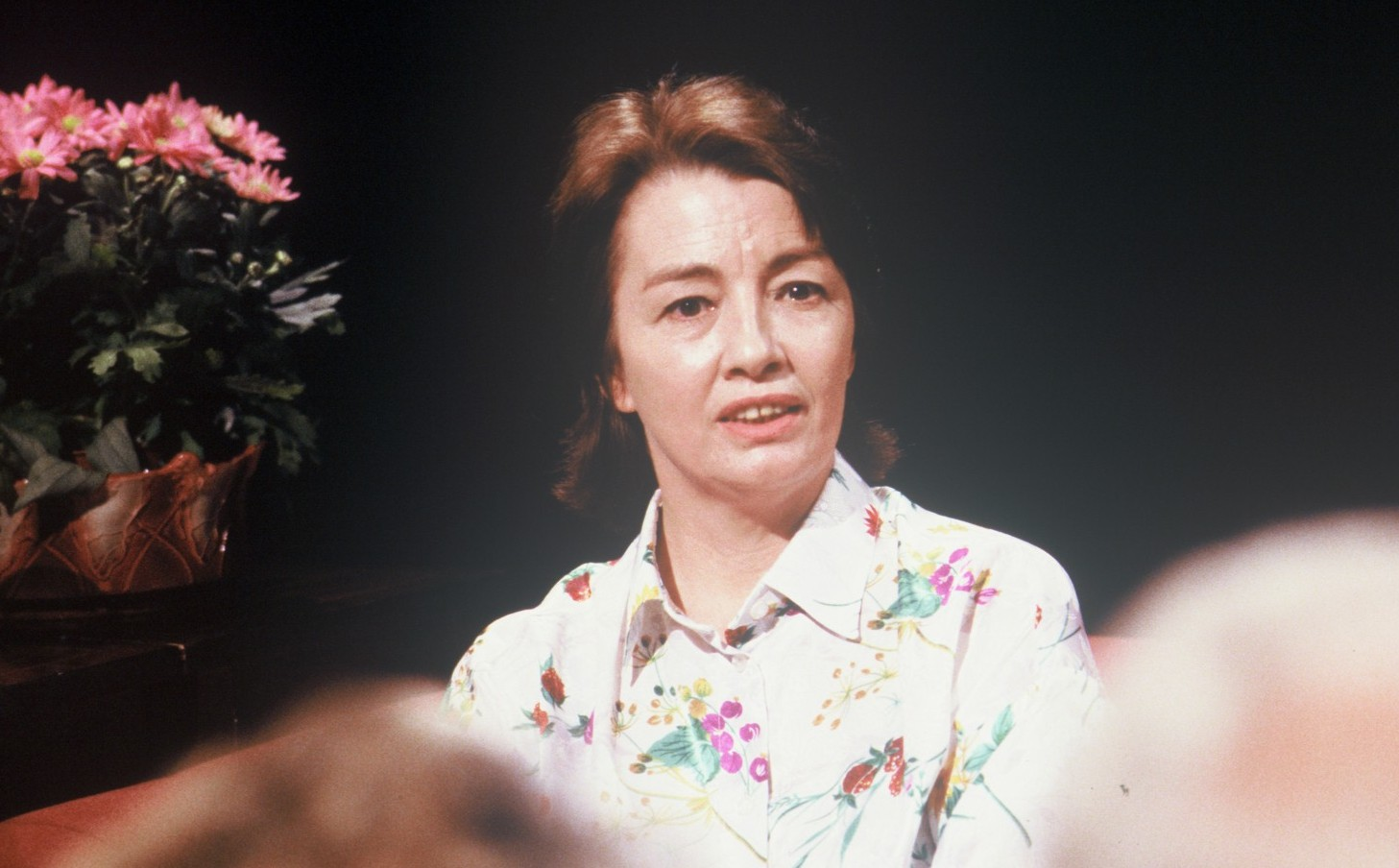
Keeler discussing the Profumo affair on After Dark in 1988

After Keeler was released from prison in 1964, she had two brief marriages: to James Edward Levermore (22 October 1965; divorced 1966) and Anthony Sydney Platt (18 February 1971; separated 1972; divorced 27 May 1977). There was a child from each union, the elder being primarily raised by Keeler's mother, Julie.

Keeler mainly lived alone in the last couple of decades of her life. Most of the considerable amount of money that she made from newspaper stories was dissipated by lawyers. She said that during the 1970s, "I was not living, I was surviving." She published several accounts of her life, in one of which she claimed that she became pregnant as a result of her relationship with Profumo and subsequently had an abortion. Her portrait by Ward was acquired by the National Portrait Gallery, London in 1984.

In 1988, Keeler was featured in Bryan Ferry's promotional video for the single "Kiss and Tell" (originally released on Ferry's seventh solo album, Bête Noire, in 1987) with Mandy Rice-Davies; this was meant to draw more attention to the song's theme. In June 1988, she made an extended appearance on Channel 4 discussion programme After Dark.

=== Death ===
Keeler died, aged 75, on 4 December 2017 at the Princess Royal University Hospital in Farnborough, London. She had been ill for some months, suffering from chronic obstructive pulmonary disease. Her funeral took place on 16 December at the West London Crematorium in Kensal Green Cemetery.

In 2026, Keeler was denied a posthumous pardon for her conviction for perjury.

== In popular culture ==
Yvonne Buckingham portrayed Keeler in a 1963 film variously titled The Christine Keeler Story, The Keeler Affair, and The Christine Keeler Affair; Keeler herself introduced the film in its opening sequence and read the cast list in voiceover at the end.

In a 1989 film about the Profumo affair, Scandal, actress Joanne Whalley portrayed Keeler. Pet Shop Boys wrote the song "Nothing Has Been Proved" for the film, its lyrics charting the main events of the scandal.

In Andrew Lloyd Webber's stage musical Stephen Ward, which opened at the Aldwych Theatre in 2013, Keeler was portrayed by Charlotte Spencer.

Keeler was portrayed by Gala Gordon during the second season of the Netflix drama series The Crown in 2017.

Keeler was portrayed by Sophie Cookson in The Trial of Christine Keeler, a six-part television series screened on BBC One from 2019 to 2020.

Funded by the Arts Council England and Arts Council of Wales, a touring exhibition called Dear Christine opened in Newcastle upon Tyne in June 2019 and toured to Swansea in October 2019, finishing at Arthouse1 in London in February 2020. The culmination of a four-year project by artist/curator Fionn Wilson to reclaim and re-frame Keeler, it features work from twenty women artists "in order to put a female perspective on a narrative that has mostly been led by men". The exhibition has been described by journalist and writer Julie Burchill as "a thing of beauty without cruelty". Critic and writer Ian McKay wrote: "In several important ways, Dear Christine, the exhibition, seeks with some noble intent to ... rescue Christine's image and experience and reprocess it, rescuing it from the newspaper front-page-Keeler that is etched into the collective consciousness". The exhibition also featured in the Morning Star, The Daily Telegraph and the International Times.

In Wales Arts Review, writer Craig Austin interviewed Fionn Wilson who says:

Christine Keeler has always fascinated me, since I first became aware of her story via the 1989 film Scandal. When I started painting, I decided to do a series of paintings of her, and as I researched Christine's life story, it struck me that, even though she is a culturally significant figure in British history, there is very little recent artistic reference to her. I decided that I would try to rectify this and add to the visual narrative around her. And so the project was born. It's also a very personal project. I have great sympathy for Christine Keeler.

The exhibition catalogue includes writing by Amanda Coe, screenwriter and executive producer of The Trial of Christine Keeler; Keeler's son Seymour Platt; art historian Kalliopi Minioudaki; and artist and art critic Bo Gorzelak Pedersen.

In the summer of 1963, "Christine", a pop single by Joyce Blair (released under the pseudonym "Miss X"), which parodied Keeler's involvement with Profumo, reached No. 37 in the UK Singles Chart despite being banned from airplay by the BBC due to its subject matter. The single had also been banned by Radio Luxembourg.

In 1964, the Jamaican ska band The Skatalites released the song "Christine Keeler" on the album Ska Authentic.

In 1979, the British post-punk band Glaxo Babies released the 7-inch single "Christine Keeler" addressing Keeler and the Profumo affair.

British progressive rock band Porcupine Tree referenced Keeler in the song "Piano Lessons" from their 1999 record Stupid Dream.

Keeler's affair with Profumo is referenced obliquely as "British politician sex" in Billy Joel's song "We Didn't Start the Fire" from the 1989 album Storm Front. Keeler is referenced in the song "Post World War Two Blues" from the 1973 album Past, Present and Future by Al Stewart.

== Publications ==
- Keeler and Meadley, Robert (1985). Sex Scandals. Xanadu. ISBN 0-947761-03-9.
- Keeler (1989). Scandal!. London: Xanadu. ISBN 0-947761-75-6. Basis for the eponymous 1989 film
- Basini, Richard and Keeler (1989). The Businessperson's Guide to Intelligent Social Drinking. Congdon & Weed. ISBN 0-312-92070-9.
- Keeler; Ivanov, Yevgeny; and Sokolov, Gennady (1992). The Naked Spy. Blake. ISBN 1-85782-092-4.
- Keeler and Thompson, Douglas (2001). The Truth at Last: My Story. London: Sidgwick & Jackson. ISBN 0-283-07291-1.
- Keeler and Thompson, Douglas (2012) [2001]. Secrets and Lies (rev. ed.). London: John Blake. ISBN 978-1-84358-755-2.
