= Yevgeny Ivanov (spy) =

Soviet spy (1926–1994)

Captain Yevgeny Mikhailovich Ivanov (Russian: Евгений Михайлович Иванов; 11 January 1926 – 17 January 1994), also known as Eugene Ivanov, was a naval attaché at the Soviet Embassy in London during the early 1960s, and was also engaged in espionage. His affair with Christine Keeler resulted in another of her lovers, John Profumo, resigning from the United Kingdom government, in what became known as the Profumo affair.

== Early life and career ==
Ivanov was born in Pskov in 1926, the son of an army officer. He joined the Red Navy in 1944. Ivanov subsequently served as a gunnery specialist in the Far East and Black Sea fleets. He underwent training with the GRU (Soviet military intelligence), before being posted to London on 27 March 1960 as Soviet assistant naval attaché.

Ivanov was accompanied to Britain by his wife Maya, daughter of Alexander Gorkin, chairman of the Supreme Court of the Soviet Union. Ivanov's English was described as competent and the Russian couple were reportedly popular in diplomatic social circles. However MI5 documents declassified and released in October 2022 described him as a heavy drinker and reckless driver who harassed female guests at parties. A complaint to the Soviet Embassy was considered by the Foreign Office but British Intelligence had hopes of turning the attaché into a double agent.

== Targeted by MI5 ==
Ivanov became friendly with osteopath Stephen Ward after being introduced to him by the managing editor of the Daily Telegraph during lunch at the Garrick Club. MI5 saw Ivanov as a potential defector and asked Ward to try to convince him to shift his allegiance to the United Kingdom.

On the weekend of 8–9 July 1961, Ivanov was at a pool party at the Cliveden estate when Christine Keeler met John Profumo, the British Secretary of State for War. Keeler's subsequent affair with Profumo went on at a time when she was also having sex with Ivanov. This was at a time when Cold War tensions were already heightened, just 15 months before the Cuban Missile Crisis. Ward and Ivanov are said to have asked Keeler to quiz Profumo as to when American nuclear missiles would be taken to then-West Germany.

== Profumo affair ==
When the Profumo affair became openly public in early June 1963, just three months after Profumo had lied in the House of Commons by denying an affair with Keeler, the ensuing scandal of Britain's war minister having an affair with the mistress of a Soviet spy resulted in several far-reaching consequences. On a personal level, Ivanov's relationship with Keeler caused Maya to leave him, while the Kremlin failed to show him much recognition. The double rejection led to Ivanov drinking heavily for some time afterwards. Ward took an overdose of barbiturates on the evening of 30 July 1963, just hours after a damning summing up by the judge at his trial on charges of living off the immoral earnings (i.e. prostitution) of Keeler and Mandy Rice-Davies. Ward slipped into a coma and was rushed to hospital; he was found guilty in absentia on 31 July, but died on 3 August before sentence could be passed.

== Later years ==
Ivanov was recalled to Moscow on 22 January 1963, prior to the Profumo affair becoming public knowledge, after the Soviet government had sensed a potential scandal involving MI5. Upon returning to the Soviet Union, Ivanov seemingly "disappeared" in the eyes of the international community by keeping a very low profile for the next 29 years, while he had actually continued his naval career, being assigned to the Black Sea Fleet, before publishing his memoirs in 1992. It is not known whether Ivanov continued to work with the GRU but he was reportedly awarded the Order of Lenin late in his career.

Keeler revealed that she met Ivanov again in Moscow in 1993.

On 17 January 1994, Ivanov was found dead in his Moscow flat at the age of 68. His official cause of death was listed as a heart attack.

== Memoirs ==
Ivanov's partially ghost-written memoirs The Naked Spy were published in 1992. In the book Ivanov stated that he had been able to obtain significant military intelligence by accessing British political circles. However he claimed that his GRU seniors remained unaware of his relationship with Keeler until the story broke in the UK, since he saw no need to report upon a private relationship.

== Cultural references ==
Ivanov is portrayed by Jeroen Krabbé in the 1989 film Scandal, and by Ian Conningham in Andrew Lloyd Webber's stage musical Stephen Ward the Musical, which opened at the Aldwych Theatre on 19 December 2013.

Ivanov was portrayed by Visar Vishka, a Yugoslavian-born actor, in the 2019 BBC TV drama series, The Trial of Christine Keeler.

Peter Sellers portrayed Ivanov in the British audio comedy Fool Britannia (1963).

== Bibliography ==
- Honeytrap (1987) by Anthony Summers & Stephen Dorril, Coronet Books, ISBN 0340429739.
- An Affair of State: The Profumo Case and the Framing of Stephen Ward Phillip Knightley and Caroline Kennedy: Jonathan Cape, London, 1987 ISBN 0-224-02347-0
