= Stephen Ward =

English osteopath (1912–1963)

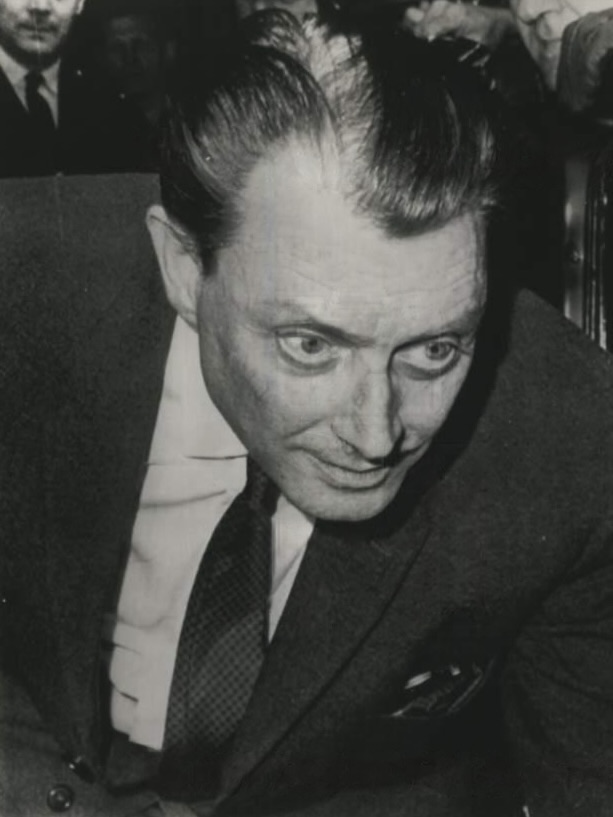
- Ward in 1963
- Born: Stephen Thomas Ward; 19 October 1912; Lemsford, Hertfordshire, England
- Died: 3 August 1963 (aged 50); Chelsea, London, England
- Cause of death: Barbiturate poisoning
- Education: Kirksville College of Osteopathy and Surgery
- Occupations: Osteopath, artist
- Known for: Central figure in the Profumo affair
- Spouse: Patricia Mary Baines (m. 1949; div. 1952)
- Military career
- Allegiance: United Kingdom
- Branch: British Army
- Service years: 1941–1945
- Rank: Second Lieutenant
- Service number: 282021
- Units: Royal Armoured Corps; Royal Army Medical Corps
- Conflicts: World War II
- Criminal information
- Status: Deceased
- Criminal charge: Two counts of living off the earnings of prostitution
- Penalty: Died prior to sentencing

Stephen Thomas Ward (19 October 1912 – 3 August 1963) was an English osteopath and artist who was one of the central figures in the 1963 Profumo affair, a British political scandal which brought about the resignation of John Profumo, the Secretary of State for War, and contributed to the defeat of the Conservative government at the general election a year later.

== Outline of events ==
In 1945, Ward began practising osteopathy in London, and rapidly became quite prominent and fashionable, with many distinguished clients. In his spare time he also studied at the Slade School and developed a talent for sketching portraits which provided a profitable sideline. His practice and his art brought considerable social success, and he made many important friends. Among these was Lord Astor, at whose country house, Cliveden, in the summer of 1961, Ward introduced Profumo to a 19-year-old showgirl and night-club model, Christine Keeler. Profumo, who was married to the actress Valerie Hobson, embarked on a brief affair with Keeler. Most of their assignations took place in Ward's home in Wimpole Mews.

Ward's friendship with the Soviet military attaché Yevgeny Ivanov, known by MI5 to be an intelligence officer, drew him to the attention of British intelligence, who sought to use him in an attempt to secure Ivanov's defection. The matter became complicated when, through Ward, Ivanov met Keeler, raising the possibility of a Profumo–Keeler–Ivanov triangle. Profumo ended his relationship with Keeler, which remained largely unsuspected until early in 1963, when the disintegration of Keeler's private life brought matters to public and press attention. Profumo denied any impropriety in a statement to the House of Commons but a few weeks later admitted his affair. He resigned from his ministerial office, parliamentary seat and membership in the Privy Council. Amid a range of rumours of widespread sex scandals in government and high society, the police began to investigate Ward. In June 1963, he was charged with prostitution offences and committed for trial.

In the trial, in July 1963, Ward was abandoned by his society friends, and exposed to the contempt and hostility of the prosecuting counsel and judge. Despite the relative paucity of evidence and the dismissal of most of the charges against him, he was convicted on two counts of living off the earnings of prostitution. Before the verdict was announced, Ward took an overdose of sleeping pills and died three days later. In 2014, the trial verdict was put under review by the Criminal Cases Review Commission, but in 2017, the commission decided not to refer the case to the Court of Appeal because the original transcript of the judge's summing up could not be found.

== Early life ==
Born in Lemsford, Hertfordshire, Stephen Ward was the second son of Arthur Evelyn Ward, Vicar of Lemsford, and Eileen Esmée, the daughter of Thomas Mercer Cliffe Vigors. The Ward family had a military and clerical background; the Vigors family were of Anglo-Irish stock. The explorer Wilfred Thesiger was a cousin; his father, Wilfred Gilbert Thesiger, son of Frederic Thesiger, 2nd Baron Chelmsford, married Eileen's elder sister, Kathleen. Stephen's siblings were John (b. 1911), Raymond (b. 1916), and twins Bridget and Eileen (b. 1925). In 1920, the family moved to Twickenham, where Arthur Ward served as the vicar of Holy Trinity Church, then in 1922 to Torquay in Devon, when he became the vicar of St. Matthias. Arthur Ward later became a Canon of Rochester Cathedral, and, in 1934, a Prebendary of Exeter Cathedral.

== Education ==
Ward was educated at Canford School, in the village of Canford Magna (near the market town of Wimborne Minster) in Dorset, as a boarder, where he was punished for an assault on a fellow pupil after refusing to name the real culprit. This experience left a longstanding mark. Somewhat lazy and a regular underachiever, Ward had few realistic career choices when he left Canford in 1929.

== Life and career ==
Ward moved to London, where he worked for a few months as a carpet salesman in Houndsditch before an uncle found him a job in Hamburg as a translator in the German branch of Shell Oil. After a year, he left the Hamburg job for Paris and registered for a course at the Sorbonne, while eking out a living as a tour guide. In 1932, he returned briefly to Torquay, before moving again to London where he worked as a tea salesman.

In 1934, he was persuaded by his mother to seek qualification as an osteopath, by studying at the Kirksville College of Osteopathy and Surgery in the United States. He spent four years there, completing a course that qualified him as a general medical practitioner in the US.

Ward was greatly impressed by the United States. He later commented: "I loved America and Americans, a warm-hearted, open and dynamic people. Their kindness and hospitality made me feel ashamed of the standoffish way the British treat people."

=== Second World War ===
On his return from the United States, Ward set up as an osteopath in Torquay. When war broke out in September 1939, he volunteered for service in the Royal Army Medical Corps (RAMC) but was rejected because his American qualifications were not recognised. In 1941, he was conscripted as a private into the Royal Armoured Corps, based at Bovington. His osteopathic skills became known, and, for much of his time at Bovington, he was relieved from general duties and permitted to practise his profession. This arrangement offended the RAMC, and, after an inquiry, Ward's activities were stopped. However, in view of his evident talents, he was recommended for a commission in the RAMC within the new category of "stretcher-bearer". On 19 June 1943, he was commissioned a second lieutenant in the non-medical section of the RAMC.

In March 1944, Ward was posted to India. The army still found it difficult to accommodate him, and he spent much time canvassing for the proper recognition of osteopathy while being officially assigned to non-medical duties. However, he found opportunities to practise his skills; among those whom he treated was Mahatma Gandhi, who impressed Ward: "Although much of his policy was opposed to that of my own country. I knew that when I was with him I was in the presence of greatness, and my encounter with him was certainly the most important meeting of my life". Following a nervous collapse that led to a period in a psychiatric hospital, Ward returned to England in October 1945 and was discharged from the army "on grounds of disability".

=== Society osteopath ===
After the Second World War, Ward worked for the Osteopathic Association Clinic in Dorset Square, London. While there, he had opportunities to treat well-known public figures, the first of whom was the American ambassador, W. Averell Harriman. Later, Ward treated Winston Churchill's son-in-law Duncan Sandys, who recommended Ward to Churchill himself.

Ward now had sufficient status and recommendations to set up his own private practice, in Cavendish Square just off Harley Street. He soon attracted a clientele from the worlds of politics, society, and show business, and his social life became absorbed into this milieu. Ward's polished manners and conversational skills assured him social success. He befriended the cartoonist and socialite Arthur Ferrier, whose parties Ward attended regularly and where he mixed with, among others, Prince Philip of Greece and Denmark, later the Duke of Edinburgh but then a junior officer in the Royal Navy. Ward's own parties were noted for their social mix: "a barrister, a barrow-boy, a writer, a motor salesman, a peer, and always, for some reason, a steady stream of pretty girls."

Ward enjoyed the company of beautiful women, but his relationships were often platonic. His preference was for the type he called "alley-cats" - city girls he could impress and dominate. He generally enjoyed discussing and watching sexual activity rather than participating, a factor which may have contributed to the failure of his marriage on 27 July 1949, to actress Patricia Mary Baines, who came from a prosperous middle-class background.

Throughout the 1950s Ward's practice grew. Among his new patients was Lord Astor, who became a close friend and who helped Ward to cement his place in London society. In return, Ward introduced the shy Astor to his own world of nightclubs, parties, and women. In 1956, for a nominal rent, Astor gave Ward the use of a riverside cottage in the grounds of his Astor family estate at Cliveden, in Buckinghamshire. Many of Ward's assorted friends from all walks of life joined him for weekends at the cottage, where from time to time they would be joined by Astor and his guests from the main house. Sometimes Ward and his party would mingle with the gatherings at the main house.

In his spare time, Ward had attended art classes at the Slade school, and subsequently developed a profitable sideline in portrait sketches. In 1960, he was commissioned by The Illustrated London News to provide a series of portraits of national and international figures. These included members of the royal family, among them Prince Philip and Princess Margaret.

Ward hoped to visit the Soviet Union to draw portraits of Soviet leaders; to help him, one of his patients, the Daily Telegraph editor Sir Colin Coote, arranged an introduction to Yevgeny Ivanov, listed as a naval attaché at the Soviet Embassy. British Intelligence (MI5) knew from the Soviet double agent Oleg Penkovsky that Ivanov was an intelligence officer in the Soviet GRU.

Ward and Ivanov became firm friends. Ivanov frequently visited Ward at Wimpole Mews and sometimes joined Ward's weekend parties at the Cliveden cottage.

MI5 considered Ivanov a possible defector and sought Ward's help to this end, allocating him to a case officer known as "Woods." Ward was later used by the British Foreign Office as a backchannel, through Ivanov, to the Soviet Union, and was involved in unofficial diplomacy at the time of the 1962 Cuban Missile Crisis.

== Profumo affair ==
In 1959, Ward met Christine Keeler, a 17-year-old showgirl who was working at Murray's Cabaret Club in Beak Street, Soho. She agreed to move in with him, although their relationship was not sexual, merely platonic. She stayed with him, on and off, for the next several years and often spent time at the riverside cottage. During the weekend of 8–9 July 1961, Keeler was among several guests at the cottage with Ward. At the main house, among a large gathering from the worlds of politics and the arts, was John Profumo, the Secretary of State for War, and his wife, the actress Valerie Hobson.

On the Saturday evening, Ward's and Astor's parties mingled at the Cliveden swimming pool, which Ward and his guests had permission to use. Ward introduced Keeler to Profumo, who was greatly attracted to her and promised to keep in touch. Ward later reported to MI5 that Profumo and Ivanov had met, and that Profumo had shown considerable interest in Keeler. This information was an unwelcome complication in MI5's plans to use her in a honeytrap operation against Ivanov which might secure his defection.

Keeler and Profumo embarked on a brief affair; some suggest that it ended after a few weeks, while others believe that it continued, with decreasing fervour, until December 1961. Keeler and Profumo usually met at Ward's house in Wimpole Mews. Profumo did not pay Keeler for her time, apart from a few small presents and on one occasion, £20 as a gift for her mother (equivalent to £390 in 2025). On 9 August 1961, Profumo was warned by Sir Norman Brook, the Cabinet Secretary, of the dangers of mixing with Ward's group, since MI5 were at this stage unsure of Ward's dependability. That same day, Profumo wrote Keeler a letter, beginning "Darling...", cancelling an assignation they had made for the following day. Some commentators have assumed that this letter ended the association; Keeler insists that the affair ended later, after her persistent refusals to stop living with Ward.

The press and public remained largely ignorant of the Keeler-Profumo liaison until early in 1963, when Keeler became a focus of newspaper attention as the "missing witness" in a case involving one of her former lovers, Johnny Edgecombe. At that point Keeler began talking indiscriminately and attempted to sell her story to newspapers. None at this stage dared print it, but rumours of the affair were widespread, and there was much speculation. A few days after the trial, on 21 March, the satirical magazine Private Eye printed the most detailed summary so far of the rumours, with the main characters lightly disguised: "Mr James Montesi", "Miss Gaye Funloving", "Dr Spook", and "Vladimir Bolokhov".

In a statement to the House of Commons on 22 March 1963, Profumo denied any impropriety with Keeler. Ward, who knew the truth, at first supported Profumo; however, when he found himself the target of an aggressive police investigation and facing prostitution charges, he revealed his knowledge to Profumo's political masters and to the press.

Profumo found the burden of sustaining his lie too much, confessed his guilt, and resigned from government and parliament. Two days after the resignation, amid growing rumours of widespread sex scandals in government and high society, Ward was arrested and charged with several counts of living off the earnings of prostitution and of procuring.

== Trial and death ==
Ward's committal proceedings began on 28 June, at Marylebone magistrates' court, where the Crown's evidence was fully reported in the press. Ward was committed for trial at the Old Bailey but was released on bail pending trial. In his account of the trial, which began on 22 July, Richard Davenport-Hines describes it as an act of political revenge: "The exorcism of scandal in high places required the façade of [Ward's] conviction on vice charges". While living with Ward, Keeler and her fellow model Mandy Rice-Davies had made small contributions to household expenses, and had repaid money lent to them by Ward. The thrust of the prosecution's case, in which Keeler and Rice-Davies were their principal witnesses, was that these payments indicated that Ward was living off their earnings from prostitution (and was thus a pimp). Ward's approximate income, from his practice and from his portraiture, had been around £5,500 a year, a substantial sum at that time (equivalent to £103,000 in 2025). However, one of the police officers involved in the investigation, Sergeant Arthur Eustace, stated that "Ward had no money in his British bank account" at the time, and that they could find nothing to indicate that he had been living off "immoral earnings". Despite being a prosecution witness, Rice-Davies "truculently tried to testify ... on behalf of the defendant", arguing that "you might as well prosecute every bachelor in London."

The prosecution case looked weak, but Ward's perceived image had been tarnished in the committal proceeding. None of his well-known friends offered to speak on his behalf, and MI5 did not reveal the uses they had made of Ward as a channel of communication to the Soviets. The prosecuting counsel, Mervyn Griffith-Jones, who adopted a tone of moral outrage, "pronounc[ing] words like 'prostitute', 'pimp', and even 'sexual intercourse' with obvious distaste", portrayed Ward as a man who represented "the very depths of lechery and depravity", and described him as "a thoroughly filthy fellow", while the judge, Sir Archie Marshall, adopted a similarly hostile attitude. Ward was represented by James Burge, who described Griffith-Jones as somebody who could "make even a honeymoon sound obscene."

Towards the end of the trial, information relating to another case, in which Keeler had been a leading witness, was revealed by the Court of Appeal. This indicated that Keeler's evidence in that earlier case had been false. Marshall did not reveal the salient fact to the Ward trial jury that the reliability of the prosecution's chief witness had been compromised, and invited the jury to disregard the appeal court's decision.

On 30 July, Marshall began his summary in a speech which was so damning that Ward despaired. That evening, after writing numerous letters to friends and to the authorities, Ward took an overdose of sleeping tablets and was taken to hospital. The next day, Marshall completed his summary and the jury found Ward guilty in absentia on the charges of living off the earnings of prostitution, while acquitting him of several other counts. Sentencing was postponed until Ward was fit to appear, but he died on 3 August.

On 9 August, a coroner's jury ruled Ward's death as suicide by barbiturate poisoning. According to reports, Ward left several notes, one of which read, "I'm sorry to disappoint the vulture ... I feel the day is lost. The ritual sacrifice is demanded and I cannot face it". On the day of the inquest, after a private memorial service at the chapel in St Stephen's Hospital, Ward's remains were cremated at Mortlake Crematorium. "Though his solicitor had asked that no flowers be sent, there was a wreath of two hundred roses from, among others", English playwrights John Osborne and Arnold Wesker, theatre critic Kenneth Tynan, writers Angus Wilson and Alan Sillitoe, and musician Acker Bilk, "who later withdrew his name". "With the flowers came a note: “To Stephen Ward, victim of British hypocrisy.”" Tynan stated that "British society created him, used him, and ruthlessly destroyed him. The Establishment has closed its ranks around its body."

In their accounts of the security aspects of the Profumo affair, Anthony Summers and Stephen Dorril provide extra information concerning Ward's last hours, his movements and his visitors. They also quote from an interview with "a former MI6 operative", who asserted that Ward had been murdered by an agent working on behalf of MI6. The main motive for the killing was Ward's ability to embarrass the government and the royal family. The method, apparently, was to encourage Ward to continue to take barbiturates until a fatal dose had been ingested. The reporter Tom Mangold, one of the last to see Ward alive, dismisses the murder theory, while allowing that there are unexplained circumstances relating to Ward's death.

== Aftermath ==
The government appointed Lord Denning, the Master of the Rolls, to investigate the various rumours that had emanated from and around the Profumo affair. Denning's report, published on 26 September 1963, concluded that there had been no security leaks nor evidence to link members of the government with associated scandals. He laid most of the blame for the affair on Ward, an "utterly immoral" man whose diplomatic activities were "misconceived and misdirected".

The Profumo affair had damaged Harold Macmillan's government; Macmillan resigned as prime minister in October 1963, citing health reasons. His successor was Lord Home who renounced his peerage and served as Sir Alec Douglas-Home. In the October 1964 general election, the Conservative government was narrowly defeated by the Labour Party and Harold Wilson became prime minister.

Ward's role on behalf of MI5 was confirmed in 1982, when the Sunday Times located his former contact, "Woods". Keeler, in one of several accounts of her life, denounced Ward as a Soviet spy, and a traitor ranking alongside Kim Philby, Guy Burgess and Donald Maclean, but without providing any evidence.

Many commentators share Davenport-Hines's view that Ward was a scapegoat and that his trial was an "historical injustice", and while not in his text, the emotive term show trial appears as a chapter heading. The human rights lawyer Geoffrey Robertson, who has written a book on the trial, Stephen Ward was Innocent, OK, has campaigned for the case to be reopened on several grounds, including the premature scheduling of the trial, lack of evidence to support the main charges and various misdirections by the trial judge in his summation. Above all, the judge failed to disclose Keeler's perjury at an earlier trial, which made her a tainted witness. Robertson has argued that "Ward was obviously not guilty of the two charges on which he was convicted, namely living off the earnings of prostitutes, for the simple reason that Christine and Mandy were not prostitutes and the even simpler reason that they lived off his earnings as a successful osteopath and painter."

In January 2014, the case, which has been described as "a gross miscarriage of justice", came under consideration by the Criminal Cases Review Commission but in 2017, the commission decided not to refer the case to the Court of Appeal, one factor being the unavailability of a full transcript of the trial. The transcript of Marshall's summing up, lodged at the National Archives, has been sealed until the year 2046, "100 years after the birth of Ms Rice-Davies, the youngest of the trial witnesses", since the standard practice "is to refuse access for one hundred years from the birth of the youngest witness in order to ensure that she is dead before revelations are made that could invade her privacy", although Rice-Davies was in fact born in 1944, not 1946.

== In popular culture ==
During a late 1963 episode of That Was the Week That Was, Ward's name was included on a list of those who had died during the outgoing year, among Édith Piaf, Jean Cocteau and John F. Kennedy. Referred to as a "black sheep", Ward's name was paired with that of Guy Burgess. In the 1989 film Scandal, which is about the Profumo affair, Ward is played by John Hurt. In Andrew Lloyd Webber's Stephen Ward the Musical, which opened in the West End at the Aldwych Theatre on 19 December 2013 and closed in 2014, Ward was portrayed by Alexander Hanson. According to Geoffrey Robertson, the script of the musical is "remarkably faithful to the facts". Ward appeared in the second season of the Netflix drama series The Crown in 2017, played by Richard Lintern. In the 2019 BBC television drama series The Trial of Christine Keeler, Ward was played by James Norton.

== Sources ==
- Davenport-Hines, Richard Peter Treadwell (2013). An English Affair: Sex, Class and Power in the Age of Profumo (2nd ed.). London, United Kingdom of Great Britain: William Collins (HarperCollins). ISBN 978-0-00-743586-9 – via Google Books.
- Denning, Lord Alfred (1992) [1963]. The Denning Report (the Profumo Affair). London: Pimlico Books. ISBN 0-7126-5255-8. Originally published as Cmnd. 2152 by Her Majesty's Stationery Office, 1963
- Irving, Clive; Hall, Ron; Wallington, Jeremy (1963). Scandal '63: A Study of the Profumo Affair (4th ed.). London: Heinemann.
- Keeler, Christine; Thompson, Douglas; et al. (Foreword by Seymour Platt) (2019) [2002]. Blake, John (ed.). Secrets and Lies: The Trials of Christine Keeler (4th ed.). London, United Kingdom of Great Britain: John Blake Publishing. ISBN 978-1-78219-961-8 – via Google.
- Knightley, Phillip; Kennedy, Caroline (1987). Cape, Jonathan (ed.). An Affair of State: The Profumo Case and the Framing of Stephen Ward. London: Jonathan Cape. ISBN 0-224-02347-0.
- Profumo, David (2007). Murray, John (ed.). Bringing the House Down: A Family Memoir (2nd ed.). London: John Murray (Publishers). ISBN 978-0-7195-6609-7.
- Robertson, Geoffrey (2013). Stephen Ward Was Innocent OK: The Case for Overturning his Conviction. London: Biteback Publishing. ISBN 978-1-84954-690-4.
- Summers, Anthony; Dorril, Stephen (1989). Honeytrap. London: Coronet Books. ISBN 0-340-42973-9.
