= Alexander William Sheppard =

Australian soldier (1913–1997)

Alex Sheppard
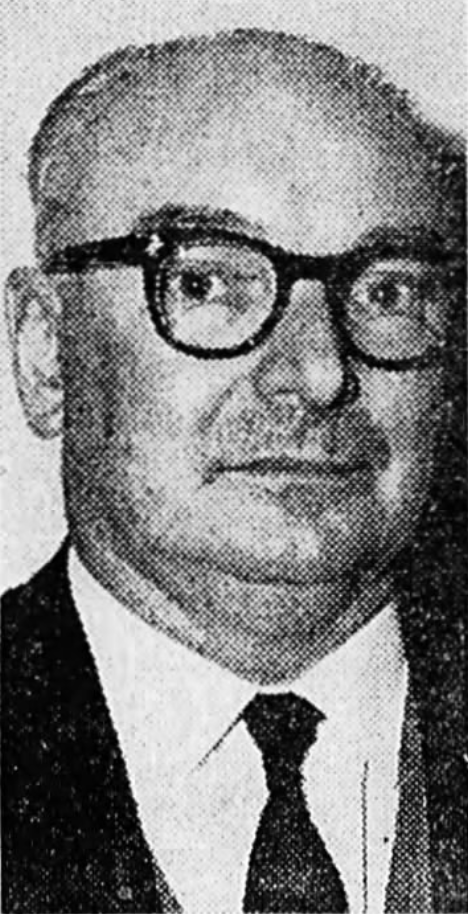
- Born: Alexander William Sheppard; 2 June 1913; East Melbourne, Australia
- Died: 10 June 1997 (aged 84); Sydney, Australia
- Occupations: Soldier, bookseller, publisher, writer
- Awards: Military Cross

Alexander William Sheppard MC (2 June 1913 – 10 June 1997) was an Australian soldier, bookseller, publisher and writer. Rising to the rank of Colonel during World War II, he won the Military Cross for his role in the Allied evacuation from Greece in 1941. As a post–1945 rehabilitation officer in Greece he denounced the atrocities of the Greek Civil War and became an "outspoken critic" of British policies and the Greek governments Britain supported. In the 1960s he fought against book censorship in Australia.

== Early life and career ==
Alex Sheppard was born in East Melbourne, Victoria, on 2 June 1913. His parents were William John Sheppard, a labourer and later a tool sharpener, and his wife Alicia (née Simmonds), who had formerly been a Salvation Army officer. He lived in the Melbourne suburbs of Collingwood, Fitzroy North where he went to school, and finally East Preston.

He studied commerce and law at the University of Melbourne. While studying he worked a part-time evening job with AWA. After graduating, he worked as a secretary with the Maritime Radio Officers' Union. He represented the union and others as an industrial advocate in the Commonwealth Court of Conciliation and Arbitration.

In his spare time he served as a member of the Australian Army Reserve.

== World War II – Greece and Middle East ==
After the declaration of war in September 1939, Sheppard immediately enlisted in the Second Australian Imperial Force and was commissioned as a lieutenant. In January 1940 his unit departed Australia and disembarked in Palestine. He worked as a Defending Officer reviewing disciplinary cases in which soldiers were accused of impertinence or insubordination, the result of which he became unpopular with certain fellow officers for gaining acquittals where those officers had failed to correctly follow army regulations. Already a linguist fluent in several languages, he attended classes in modern Greek "as often as he could" at the Berlitz language school in Tel Aviv.

He took part in the Western Desert campaign and was present during the siege of Tobruk. He was promoted to Major and was responsible for the welfare of the civilian population in the port town of Derna near Benghazi.

In March 1941 Sheppard was sent to northern Greece, where his unit's mission was to cover for the retreat of Greek troops facing the imminent German invasion of that country. He worked as a liaison officer, then was in charge of transporting food and supplies by donkey, with the assistance of local Greek porters and resistance fighters, over rough tracks and in mountain areas and "always at risk from attack from... enemy patrols".

Returning to Athens, he was ordered to organise and supervise the evacuation of Commonwealth troops from the beach at Porto Rafti (known by the military code name of "Beach D"). In so doing, he succeeded in rescuing of "over 15,000" troops under cover of darkness over five nights "without a hitch" and "without loss of life".

In Crete he assisted in co-ordinating the partisan groups in harassing the German occupiers, after which he was evacuated to Alexandria, Egypt, by submarine. He was then sent to Baalbek in the Mandate for Syria and the Lebanon where he was appointed Deputy Adjutant General of the 6th Division and acting Deputy Quartermaster General in the 6th Division of the Australian Army.

He was recommended for the award of a Military Cross, with the recommendation commending him for performing two duties in Greece – the moving of supplies on donkeys "even in the presence of enemy patrols" and his organising and controlling the embarkation of "15,000" troops – "with distinction, courage and determination".

== World War II – Australia ==
When, following the attack on Pearl Harbor, the Curtin Labor government in Australia decided to bring Australian troops back from the Middle East to the Pacific area, the 6th and 7th Divisions were ordered to return to Australia. Sheppard, now aged 27, was promoted to Lieutenant Colonel and sent to the 6th Division Headquarters near Adelaide River, Northern Territory as Acting Assistant Quartermaster General, with orders to help strengthen Darwin's defenses in the wake of recent Japanese attacks there. Finding military preparations there in a "shambles", he set about improving signals, supply lines, accommodation and the quality of the frontline troops (with unreliable militia troops being replaced by combat-experienced AIF soldiers).

After nine months in the Northern Territory, Sheppard was sent to Melbourne to sit on an inquiry "charged with drawing up plans for a Legal Service". He was promoted to the rank of Colonel. His duties brought him into regular but acrimonious contact with Sir Thomas Blamey, the Commander in Chief of the Australian Military Forces and he hoped for a transfer to the combat frontlines in New Guinea.

== Postwar Greece: Red Cross, UNRRA, British Economic Mission ==
Sheppard had not forgotten his experiences in Greece and the Greek people who had assisted Allied troops at great personal risk. He was "over-joyed" to hear of the liberation of Greece in October but his "optimism ... turned to despair" as he witnessed the British campaign, under Winston Churchill, to crush the Greek republican resistance and reinstall the monarchy. In April 1945 he accepted an offer to return to Greece as head of a team of volunteers from the Australian Red Cross working for the United Nations Relief and Rehabilitation Administration (UNRRA) while retaining his position in the Australian Army's Reserve of Army Officers.

Sheppard was the UNRRA's Officer in Charge of refugee camps at Florina, Kozani and Sidhirokastron. In the first six months, he helped 15,000 refugees, but he found the camps places of "desperation, destitution and horror", that the UNRRA was only "half tackling the problem of Displaced Persons, with no resettlement or retraining program" in place, and that the Royalist government in Athens was pinning a "communist" label on any republican, liberal or democrat refugee and treating them appallingly.

When his services with the refugees were no longer needed, he was made Officer in Charge of the UNRRA Northern Greece clothing programmes. He distributed food and clothing. Finding that UNRRA food relief supplies were often not being distributed by the government but hoarded in warehouses (in order to increase the government's power over the population by using hunger as a weapon), on one occasion he demonstrated his belief in direct action by "smashing open a warehouse and distributing food to hungry peasants".

He came across the Pavlo Milas Artillery Barracks which was used as a "concentration camp for left-wing political prisoners" and tried to improve the conditions of the inmates there. He regularly reported his findings to senior British and Greek officials. He came to believe that Greece in that period was becoming a "police state" under martial law.

In July 1948 he was appointed Director of the Northern Greek Office of the British Economic Mission. His role required him to spend British funds to repair roads and other infrastructure, assist in reviving various Greek industries, and to support orphanages and schools. He also continued to assist political prisoners, attend trials being held under the Emergency Measures Acts recently passed by the Greek government, and support the activities of trade unionists. All the while he would regularly report abuses to E. H. Peck, the British Consul in Salonika, hoping that Peck would pass that information back to the Foreign Office in London. He was warned by General Clark, the head of the British Economic Mission, not to get "too close" to trades unions.

Following a plebiscite, King George II was restored to the Greek throne. Mass arrests and executions of both moderate and communist leftists, and village massacres, became more frequent, and the civil war worsened. Sheppard continued to attend trials and visit jails and camps. On one occasion, he intervened to prevent the execution of a fifteen year old schoolgirl, Euphraxia Nicolaides, who had been charged with "giving material comfort to the rebels". For this he was reprimanded for "exceeding his authority" and "interfering in the affairs of a friendly nation".

During these post-war years in Greece, Sheppard made sure to locate and visit the friends that he had made during the war years to "thank them for everything they had done, not just for him but for other Australian troops" at great risk for themselves and their family members.

== Unofficial ambassador for Greek rebels ==
Having lost his position with the British Economic Mission in January 1947 when it shut down its operations in Greece, Sheppard returned to Britain and undertook a series of speaking engagements throughout England and Wales on behalf of the League for Democracy in Greece.

He addressed the Foreign Affairs Sub-Committee in the House of Commons in Westminster. It was on that occasion that he learnt his eye-witness reports on the various Greek Civil War atrocities submitted to Peck for forwarding to the Foreign Office had been altered by Peck or someone else to suggest the leftists were to blame and absolving the right-wing forces.

Returning to Australia to rejoin his family, Sheppard found himself under attack by conservatives including Adair Macalister Blain, MP, and Major William S. Jordan in News Weekly, suggesting he was a Communist. In reply, the Australian Minister for the Army, the Hon. Cyril Chambers confirmed that "Army records do not indicate that this officer has had any official connexion of the nature mentioned". A similar accusation occurred in October 1948 when Jack Lang, MP declared that Sheppard was a traitor, whose passport should be confiscated. The Australian Minister for Immigration, the Hon. Arthur Calwell, wrote a letter confirming Sheppard was not a Communist and that his Australian passport remained valid. In a letter to the News Weekly, Sheppard reiterated that he was "not a Communist but an active Christian and a communicant with the Church of England, an impartial friend of liberalism for 17 years".

In 1948 he attended a United Nations Organization peace conference in Paris on the Greek Civil War. He had no diplomatic status but had been deputised to attend by General Markos Vafeiadis, the leader of the rebel Democratic Army of Greece and its Provisional Democratic Government, and authorised to communicate the substance of Markos's peace terms. At the end those peace terms were scuppered by one of Markos's colleagues, Nikos Zachariadis.

In the same year, the Athens government accused the rebels of abducting children and sending them abroad for Communist indoctrination. It brought these claims before the Special Commission of the United Nations Organization for the Balkans. Sheppard set about his own fact finding mission, visiting Greek children in camps in Yugoslavia, Romania, Bulgaria, Albania and Hungary, and found the children well cared for and not being indoctrinated and that they had been voluntarily sent there by their parents to avoid the bombing campaigns in Greece. The U.N. General Assembly finally declared in November 1948 that the children had not been forcibly abducted.

Sheppard continued to write and hold meetings to alert the Australian and world public to the ongoing crisis in Greece. Following a plea from the Provisional Democratic Government rebels to represent their cause before the U.N., he sailed for Europe in September 1949. However, when he reached Geneva, he found that the position of the rebels had collapsed due to infighting amongst its leaders which undermined their forces on the battlefield.

In 1950, finding himself expelled from the League for Democracy in Greece, Sheppard founded a new group, the Committee for Democracy in Greece, through he continued his public meetings on Greece.

== Bookseller and publisher ==
Sheppard decided not to continue a career in the Army or law, and instead in 1950 he and his wife purchased Morgan's Bookshop at 9 Castlereagh Street, Sydney. That bookshop became "an oasis in excellence of thought" and his many customers included politicians such as William McMahon and Herbert Evatt. In 1957, Sheppard was briefly involved with John Wear Burton in establishing a Canberra branch of Morgan's.

Sheppard supported the "No" case against Robert Menzies's 1951 referendum seeking to ban the Communist Party of Australia. During this campaign he found himself arguing against conservative Catholic Action elements in the trade unions and against B. A. Santamaria's News Weekly.

In 1961 Sheppard and his wife sold Morgan's Bookshop and opened another in Anchor House, Sydney and yet another in North Sydney, before opening the Sheppard Bookshop at 104 Bathurst Street, Sydney.

He became active in book trade and writers' associations, notably as president of both the NSW Booksellers Association and the Federal Booksellers Association and foundational treasurer of the Australian Society of Authors. He was also an active member of the NSW Council for Civil Liberties.

In 1968 Sheppard set up Alpha Books, an "aggressively Australian" one person publishing house operating in direct competition with the large multinational businesses dominating the Australian book publishing market in that period. Notable books published by Alpha included Joanne Stevenson's No Case to Answer (about the Melbourne–Voyager collision), Vince Kelly's A Man of the People (about Sir William McKell), and J. T. Lang's The Turbulent Years.

== Challenge to Australian censorship laws ==
Sheppard had long supported freedom of speech, and wrote articles criticising Australia's banning of books by writers such as Stephen Linakis, Barry Hines, Stephen Vizinczey and Restif de la Bretonne and asking "why were these books banned?".

During the mid-1960s, he mounted a series of vigorous challenges to the restrictive book censorship laws in Australia. His actions ran the risk of him being fined or jailed by the authorities.

Sheppard had been "annoyed" when in 1964 he had heard some British writers refer to Australia's "juvenile censorship laws" and he "decided to do something about it" by publishing in 1965, with the assistance of several colleagues including Leon Fink, a Sydney entrepreneur, and Ken Buckley, the secretary of the NSW Council for Civil Liberties, the book The Trial of Lady Chatterley's Lover in Australia. At that time D. H. Lawrence's novel Lady Chatterley's Lover had been designated, by the Department of Customs & Excise and under the Australian Commonwealth law, a "prohibited import" in Australia for four years, and The Trial of Lady Chatterley's Lover, an account of the British trial about that country's ban of the novel, had recently been banned for importation into Australia.

Sheppard realised that the Federal law which banned the import of those books from overseas did not prohibit anything printed by the Australian States. So he technically avoided the Federal ban by having friends in England airmail him a few pages of the book at a time, and then assembling the whole book and printing it in Australia. He then sent a copy to the State Attorney-General, Chief Secretary and Police Commissioner in every Australian state, "with letters inviting them to prosecute him" if they thought he was breaking the laws of their state.

No Australian state took action, except Victoria whose "pugnacious" and "at times ... reactionary" Attorney-General, Arthur Rylah, decided to prosecute Sheppard, not for publishing an obscene article but for contravening a law which prohibited the reproduction of trial evidence by unauthorised persons. However, due to the publicity the case was attracting, Victoria dropped the case and the Federal government ended the banning of this book.

1n 1966 Sheppard announced his plan to publish James Baldwin's Another Country, another book then banned as a "prohibited import" in Australia, and that he would again import pages by air mail and then assemble the pages and print the book. He did this and the Australian ban was lifted.

Sheppard's publications of The Trial of Lady Chatterley's Lover and Another Country in Australia attracted great publicity and have been described as causes célèbres. He avoided fines and jail time but lost money when cheaper foreign copies were immediately and legally imported from abroad once the bans had been lifted.

A proposal suggested by Senator Ken Anderson to introduce uniform book censorship in all of the nine Australian states was seen by Sheppard as "even less liberal" than the previous laws.

A number of books would remain banned in Australia until the early 1970s when the federal Minister of Customs and Excise, Don Chipp, largely ended censorship of printed material in the country.

== Final years ==
In the 1960s and 1970s Sheppard continued to engage in "methodically organized interventions" during the Greek Regime of the Colonels and was one of the foundation members and the chairman of the Australian Committee for the Restoration of Democracy in Greece (1967–74). He was a regular at Sydney demonstrations against the Vietnam War. In 1963, alongside Walter Stone, Dal Stivens and Jill Hellyer, he co-founded the Australian Society of Authors (ASA).

== Bibliography ==
=== Books written by A. W. Sheppard ===
- Britain in Greece: An Exposé of How Greece Ceased to be the Home of Liberty and Became a Police State, and Particularly of the Part Played in this by British Officialdom and British Policy: A Study in International Interference, London: League for Democracy in Greece, 1947.
- An Australian Officer in Greece: An Exposé of How Greece... Became a Police State..., Melbourne: International Bookshop for the Democritus League, 1947.
- Inside Story: Greece's Struggle for Freedom, Sydney: League for Democracy in Greece, c. 1947.
- Les enfants Grecs ont retrouvé la paix et le bien-être, Paris: A.W. Sheppard, c. 1948.
- Mindszenty and the Protestant Pastors: A Factual Account of the Famous Trials in Hungary and Bulgaria, Sydney: Free Citizen Press, 1949.
- The Nazis Rise Again: The Story of the First Rise of Nazism, Its Temporary Eclipse, and Its Resurgence in Recent Times, Sydney: Gornall, c. 1950.
- Catholic Action and Australian Labor, Sydney: Morgan Publications, c. 1955 (Freedom Series, no. 1).

=== Books edited by A. W. Sheppard ===
- Georges Lambrinos (Giorgis Lambrinos), Makronissos: the American Dachau in Greece, Sydney: League for Democracy in Greece, c. 1949. Translated from the modern Greek with an introduction by A. W. Sheppard. Original title (transliterated): To amerikaniko Dachaou stin Ellada.
- G. H. Fearnside and Ken Clift, Dougherty, a great man among men: a biography of Major General Sir Ivan Dougherty, Sydney: Alpha Books, 1979.

=== Articles written by A. W. Sheppard ===
- "City without a soul: commercial League of Nations in Alexandria", Sydney Morning Herald, 18 July 1942, p. 7.
- "Miracle of the Nile Delta: harnessing of a flood", The Sydney Morning Herald, 1 August 1942, p. 7.
- "Fiasco in Greece: II. Griswold's one chance", The Nation, 6 December 1947, p. 616.
- "Inside Franco's domain", The Nation, 9 October 1948, pp. 401–403.
- "Torture flowers", 31 March 1973, p. 18 - review of Amalia Fleming's A Piece of Truth
- "This is a man", The Sydney Morning Herald, 7 February 1976, p. 18 - review of biography of Iven Mackay
- "The heroes of Kokoda find their champion", The Age, 16 April 1983, p. 137.
- "Wartime leader finds fulfilment in peace", The Sydney Morning Herald, 18 June 1983, p. 133 - review of biography of Brigadier Sir Frederick Galleghan
- "2,650 days and nights of intrigue", The Sydney Morning Herald, 28 December 1985, p. 31.
- "Testing times for a spy", The Sydney Morning Herald, 1 March 1986, p. 46.
- "Lord Kitchener: could he have stymied the 1917 Revolution?", The Sydney Morning Herald, 5 April 1986, p. 48.
- "Greeks in Australia", The Sydney Morning Herald, 19 April 1986, p. 158.
- "Allegations of war crimes", The Age, 20 September 1986, p. 157.
- "A tale of courage and error", The Sydney Morning Herald, 18 November 1986, p. 47 - review of Ten Days to Destiny: The Battle for Crete by G. C. Kiriakopoulos.
- "Porto Rafti evacuees kept their shirts on", The Sydney Morning Herald, 6 July 1991, p. 41.
- "Publishing hero deserves better", The Sydney Morning Herald, 15 October 1994, p. 158.

== Honours ==
- Military Cross (1944)

== Personal life ==
In 1938 Sheppard married Daisie Eileen B. Douglas (born 1912) who was normally referred to as Eileen. They had two daughters, Joan Alicia Sheppard and Helen Faith Sheppard.

Sheppard died on 10 June 1997 and Eileen died on 21 May 2001.
