= R v Penguin Books Ltd =

1960 UK court case on obscenity laws

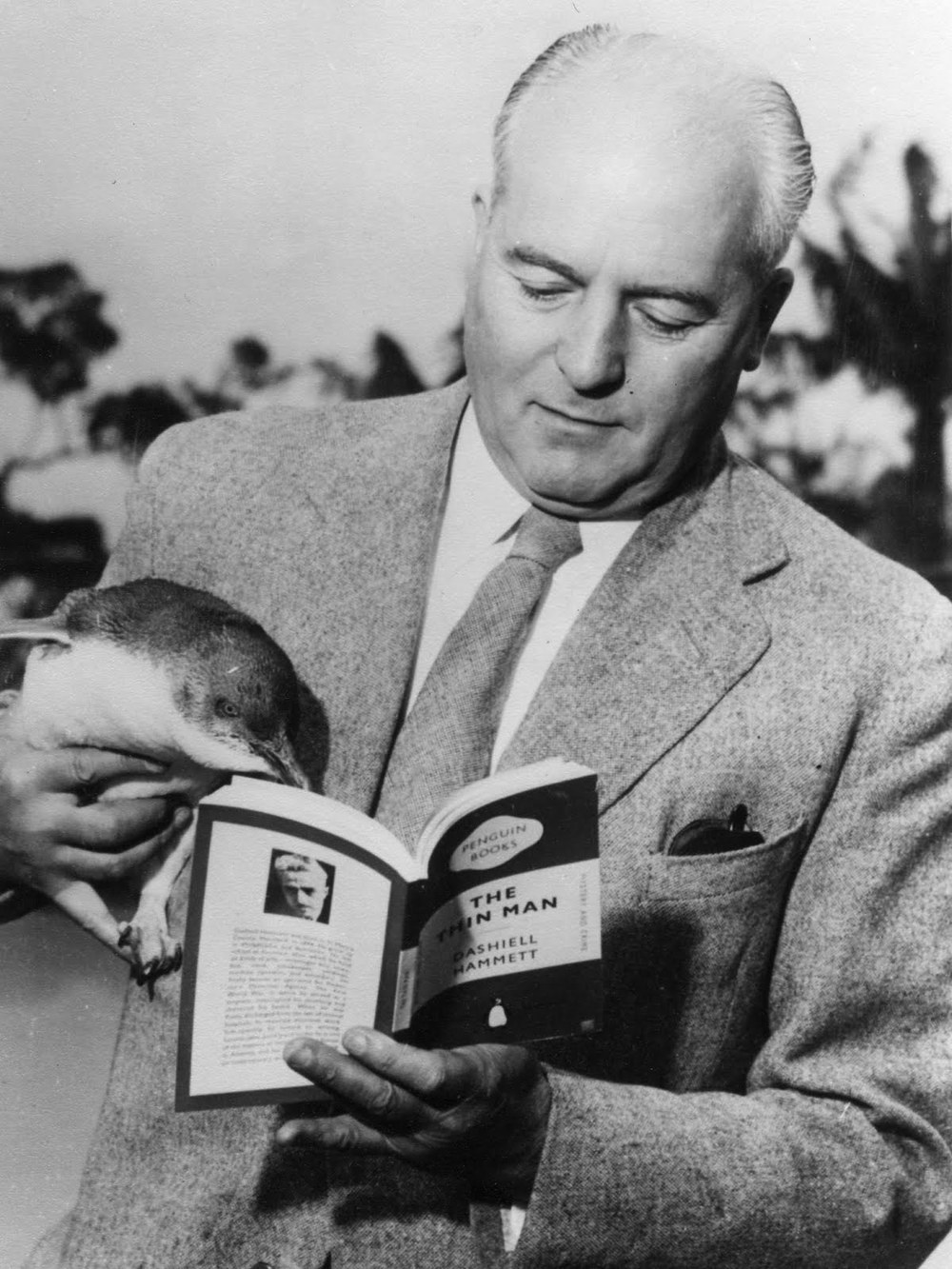
Allen Lane, founder of Penguin Books Ltd. and co-defendant in the case.

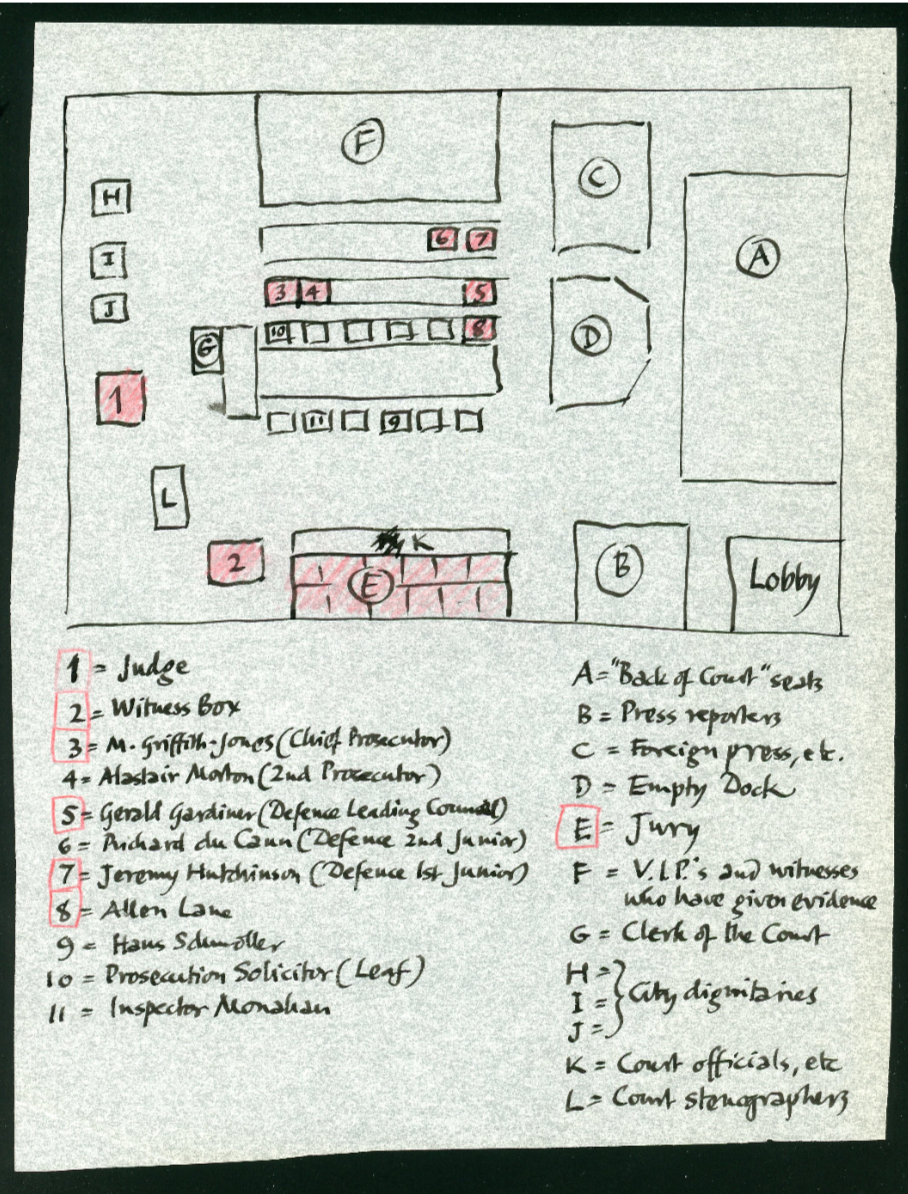
Courtroom diagram by Hans Schmoller from the October to November 1960 Lady Chatterley trial at the Old Bailey in London

R v Penguin Books Ltd (Note: [1961] Crim LR 176) (also known as The Lady Chatterley Trial) was the public prosecution in the United Kingdom of Penguin Books under the Obscene Publications Act 1959 (Note: 1959 Chapter 66 7 and 8 Eliz 2) for the publication of D. H. Lawrence's 1928 novel Lady Chatterley's Lover. The trial took place over six days, in No 1 court of the Old Bailey, between 20 October and 2 November 1960, with Mervyn Griffith-Jones (Note: Senior Treasury Counsel at the Old Bailey, junior counsel Mr Alastair Morton) prosecuting, Gerald Gardiner counsel for the defence (Note: with Jeremy Hutchinson and Richard du Cann) and Laurence Byrne presiding. The trial was a test case of the defence of public good provision under section 4 of the Act which was defined as a work "in the interests of science, literature, art or learning, or of other objects of general concern".

The jury found for the defendant in a result that ushered in the liberalisation of publishing and that some saw as the beginning of the permissive society in Britain.

== Legislative and legal background ==
The Obscene Publications Bill was first put before the UK Parliament in 1955 as a private member's bill on the recommendation of the Herbert Committee (Note: At the instigation of the Society of Authors. Penguin had previously run the risk of prosecution for obscene libel with the publication of Germinal and The Decameron.) in response to what was seen as the failure of the existing common law offence of obscene libel. The Bill's sponsor Roy Jenkins cited five prosecutions in 1954 (Note: R v Secker 1 WLR 1138; R v Reiter 2 Q.B. 16 especially. See "Obscene Publications". Parliamentary Debates (Hansard). Vol. 597. House of Commons. 16 December 1958. col. 992–1051. for the Commons debate of the Select Committee Report.) which highlighted the uncertainty of the law on obscenity and that the basis of the existing law, R v Hicklin, had the effect of a stringent literary censorship. Consequently, the resultant Act made specific provision for a defence of public good, broadly defined as a work of artistic or scientific merit, intended to exclude literature from the scope of the law while still permitting the prosecution of pornography or such works that would under section 2 of the Act "tend to deprave and corrupt persons likely to read it". The Act also required the court to consider the work as a whole, put a time limit on prosecutions, provided booksellers with a defence of innocent dissemination, gave publishers a right of defence against a destruction order, provided the right of appeal, and limited the penalty of conviction. The Act came into force on 30 August 1959.

The Director of Public Prosecutions (DPP), Sir Theobald Mathew, made submission to the Bill's Commons Select Committee on 27 May 1957 that his office would "take into account the existing reputation of the author, the publisher, the printer" before deciding on prosecution. Roy Jenkins wrote to The Spectator on 26 August 1960 (Note: While the case was sub judice.) that the DPP's decision to indict Penguin was a misapplication of the law. (Note: A point he also attempted to make in his testimony at the trial before being silenced by the judge.)

== Publication history ==
Lawrence's novel had been the subject of three drafts before the final unexpurgated typewritten transcript was submitted to the Florentine printers on 9 March 1928 with the intention of publishing a private limited edition of 1000 copies. Martin Secker refused to publish the work in this form, forcing Lawrence to publish the first edition of the final version himself without copyright protection in July 1928. That August, U.S. customs confiscated imported copies of this edition, as indeed did Scotland Yard. Although The First Lady Chatterley published by the Dial Press in 1944 was declared obscene by a U.S. court (overruled several months later), it took until 21 July 1959 for a U.S. court to rule that the first authorised unexpurgated edition of Lady Chatterley's Lover (published by Grove) was not obscene. On 16 August 1960, Penguin published the first unexpurgated English edition of Lady Chatterley's Lover.

On 18 March 1960 the Chief Constable of Peterborough wrote to the DPP seeking advice regarding the imminent publication of the book, though there was no evidence of publication at this time. On 16 August Penguin presented 15 copies to D.I. Monahan; legal proceedings were instituted, and a summons was issued on 25 August at Bow Street Magistrates' Court.

== Trial ==
=== Counsels' opening addresses ===
Prosecuting, Mervyn Griffith-Jones began by urging the jury to decide if the book was obscene under section 2 of the Act and if so whether its literary merit provided for a 'public good' under section 4, and that they must judge the book as a whole. Inviting them to consider as a test of whether it would deprave or corrupt he asked "Would you approve of your young sons, young daughters—because girls can read as well as boys—reading this book? Is it a book you would have lying around your own house? Is it a book that you would even wish your wife or your servants to read?" This last question was the cause of some amusement in the court, and as a signal of how out of touch the establishment were with everyday life, has echoed in popular culture since. He also conceded that Lawrence was a writer of stature and that the book may have had some literary value but the obscenity of its language, its recommendation of what appears to be adulterous promiscuity and that the plot is mere padding for descriptions of sexual intercourse outweighed any such defence.

Gerald Gardiner outlined the case for the defence: that the book was not obscene under section 2 as it would not deprave or corrupt anyone, and that due to Lawrence's status the work satisfied section 4. That "Lawrence's message, as you have heard, was that the society of his day in England was sick, he thought, and the sickness from which it was suffering was the result of the machine age, the 'bitch-goddess Success', the importance that everybody attached to money, and the degree to which the mind had been stressed at the expense of the body; and that what we ought to do was to re-establish personal relationships, the greatest of which was the relationship between a man and a woman in love, in which there was no shame and nothing wrong, nothing unclean, nothing which anybody was not entitled to discuss." Therefore, the descriptions of sex were necessary and appropriate.

The defence then called 35 witnesses (Note: In order: Graham Hough, Helen Gardner, Joan Bennett, Rebecca West, Bishop of Woolwich, Vivian de Sola Pinto, William Emrys Williams, A. Stephen Hopkinson, Richard Hoggart, Francis Cammaerts, Sarah Beryl Jones, C. V. Wedgwood, Francis Williams, E. M. Forster, Roy Jenkins, Walter Allen, Anne Scott-James, James Hemming, Raymond Williams, Norman St John-Stevas, J. W. Lambert, Allen Lane, Canon Milford, Kenneth Muir, Stanley Unwin, Cecil Day-Lewis, Stephen Potter, Janet Adam Smith, Noel Annan, Donald Tytler, John Connell, Dilys Powell, C. K. Young, Hector Hetherington, Bernardine Wall.) to testify to the artistic, sociological and moral value of the book. The prosecution called two witnesses: D.I. Monahan and Stephen Webb from the Board of Trade.

=== Bishop of Woolwich ===
The defence called John Robinson, the Bishop of Woolwich, to elicit "[w]hat, if any, are the ethical merits of this book?" After objection from the prosecution on the relevance of this testimony the judge agreed it satisfied the "other objects" criterion of subsection 2 section 4 of the Act. Robinson said that while Lawrence's view was not Christian his intention "is to portray the sex relationship as something essentially sacred." He continued "as in a real sense a holy communion. For him flesh was completely sacramental of spirit. His descriptions of sexual relations cannot be taken out of the context of his whole, to me, quite astonishing sensitivity to the beauty and value of all organic relationships." Pressed by Griffith-Jones on whether the book had any instructional value, Robinson admitted it did not but, asked by Gardiner if it were a book Christians ought to view, Robinson said "yes", over the objection of the prosecution that it was for the jury to decide if its publication was justified. Nevertheless, Robinson's statement led to the newspaper headline "A Book All Christians Should Read".

=== Richard Hoggart ===
In testimony that was later seen to have had a deciding influence on the trial (Note: "very much the 'man of the match' for the defence team – had made a powerful impact by his down-to-earth evidence". Robertson in Rolph 1990, p. x) the sociologist and lecturer in English Literature Richard Hoggart was called to testify to the literary value of Lady Chatterley's Lover. In a detailed textual analysis of the book under defence examination, Hoggart was asked about the purpose of the obscene words in the book: "[t]he first effect, when I first read it was some shock, because they don't go into polite literature normally. Then as one read further on one found the words lost that shock. They were being progressively purified as they were used. We have no word in English for this act which is not either a long abstraction or an evasive euphemism, and we are constantly running away from it, or dissolving into dots, at a passage like that. He wanted to say, 'This is what one does. In a simple, ordinary way, one fucks,' with no sniggering or dirt."

Cross-examining for the prosecution, Griffith-Jones pursued Hoggart's previous description of the book as "highly virtuous if not puritanical". "I thought I had lived my life under a misapprehension as to the meaning of the word 'puritanical'. Will you please help me?" "Yes, many people do live their lives under a misapprehension of the meaning of the word 'puritanical'. This is the way in which language decays. In England today and for a long time the word 'puritanical' has been extended to mean somebody who is against anything which is pleasurable, particularly sex. The proper meaning of it, to a literary man or to a linguist, is somebody who belongs to the tradition of British Puritanism generally, and the distinguishing feature of that is an intense sense of responsibility for one's conscience. In this sense the book is puritanical."

=== Legal argument and ruling ===
During examination of James Hemming the question was submitted by Gardiner whether reference to other books was permissible as evidence with respect to the author's intention and particularly the production of other books to show by way of comparison what the climate of literature was and how well the authorial intention was carried out; further, that the 1959 Act had changed the law regarding judging the work as a whole and whether the Act required proof of criminal intent. Gardiner's contention was that intent to deprave and corrupt was a rebuttable one and hence evidence can be called to prove there was no intent to deprave. In reply, Griffith-Jones cited R v Montalk 1932 that "the offence of uttering and publishing an obscene libel [...] is established as soon as the Prosecution has proved the publication and obscenity of the matter charged, and a jury should not be directed that, beyond this, they must find an intent to corrupt public morals.'" Gardiner countered that while he accepted the prosecution's argument in R v Montalk that intent to corrupt public morals is inferred from the act of publication, that presumption is itself a matter of fact and rebuttable.

The judge gave his opinion that the defence was not justified in calling evidence to prove that there was no intent to deprave and corrupt, that defence could not produce other books with respect to evidence of the present book's obscenity rather than literary merit and that expert testimony could not be called as to the public good of the work which was a matter for the jury.

=== Closing statements ===
In a lengthy speech, which has been praised for its "forensic advocacy", Gardiner began by recapitulating the testimony of the defence witnesses, after which he went on to examine the tactics of the prosecution: "In answer to what these witnesses have said, hardly any question has been put to them by the prosecution about the book as a whole. The technique has been just as it used to be before the Act: to read out particular passages and say "Now do you call that moral?", or "Do you think that is a good bit of writing?" The one thing which this Act has made plain is that in future, in fairness to the author, the book must be judged as a whole." In reference to the desirability of publication Gardiner invited the jury to consider that, "In my submission to you the defendants have shown, on the balance of probabilities, that it would be for the public good that this book should be generally available. I say on the balance of probabilities because ... where the prosecution has to establish something in a criminal case the burden which rests on them is to satisfy a jury beyond a reasonable doubt; where the defence have to discharge some burden of proof it is a lesser burden, it is the burden of satisfying a jury on a mere balance of probabilities." And in referring to the judge's ruling on the admissibility of other books for comparison Gardiner simply entreated the jury: "All you can do is to judge it as a whole in the existing climate of literature and with your own knowledge of human life."

In his closing remarks Griffith-Jones examined the definition of obscenity and the change of its wording in law: "It is true that the old definition is now altered, and the words 'those whose minds are open to such influences', are changed to 'those who may in all the circumstances read the book'. You may think that place rather a less burden upon the prosecution than hitherto, that it rather widens the scope of this Act than otherwise, for now, irrespective of whether the person reading the book is one of a rather dull or perhaps retarded or stupid intellect, one whose mind may be open to such influences, there is not any such restricted class. It is anyone who may read the book in all the circumstances." With respect to the moral character of the book he observed: "It is said that this book condemns promiscuity. Does it? [...] But it does [condone promiscuity], doesn't it? The earlier sexual experiences of both parties, then Michaelis, then Mellors – it is said that this is only showing how perfect sexual intercourse can lead to ultimate happiness. Members of the jury, the short answer to that view of the matter is this, which I think I put to one witness: what is there in the book to suggest that if the sexual intercourse between lady Chatterley and Mellors had not eventually turned out to be successful she would not have gone on and on and on elsewhere until she did find it?" In a point not raised in cross-examination Griffith-Jones asked the jury to consider the passage of the novel on p. 258 (Note: Penguin 1960 edition.) which suggested heterosexual anal sex, then a criminal act in England and Wales, which (though Griffith-Jones didn't belabour the point), had it been examined more closely, might have been damning to the defence case that the book was not obscene.

After three hours of deliberation the jury returned a unanimous verdict of not guilty.

== Legal and cultural consequences ==
Lord Teviot moved for the Second Macmillan ministry to ban all such publications on 14 December 1960; peers exchanged 18,770 words but voted down his motion in a spoken vote. Had the vote succeeded, it still would have needed backing from the House of Commons to create any legal changes.

The decision marked an important turning point in the way Obscene Publications Act prosecutions were handled. Generally, it was established that a prosecution would not be brought against the written word in a work of literary merit. The subsequent acquittal of the publishers of Inside Linda Lovelace in 1976 broadened this to include written works regardless of literary merit.

Richard Hoggart in his autobiography wrote of the trial: "It has been entered on the agreed if conventional list of literary judgements as the moment at which the confused mesh of British attitudes to class, to literature, to the intellectual life, and to censorship, publicly clashed as rarely before – to the confusion of more conservative attitudes. On the far side of that watershed and largely as a consequence, the favoured story continues, we had the Permissive Society. All of which is excessive and over-simple, but has some truth." Philip Larkin referred to the trial in his 1974 poem "Annus Mirabilis":

Sexual intercourse began
In nineteen sixty-three
(which was rather late for me) –
Between the end of the Chatterley ban
And the Beatles' first LP.

== See also ==
- The Chatterley Affair
- Irving v Penguin Books and Lipstadt
- Oz trial
- Penguin Group (USA) Inc. v. American Buddha
- Alexander William Sheppard

== Sources ==
- Rolph, C. H., ed. (1961). The Trial of Lady Chatterley (1st ed.). Harmondsworth, Middlesex, UK: Penguin Books. OCLC 541934851.
- Rolph, C. H., ed. (1990). The Trial of Lady Chatterley (2nd (30th Anniversary) ed.). Harmondsworth, Middlesex, UK: Penguin Books. ISBN 9780140133813. OCLC 23310007. With a foreword by Geoffrey Robertson.
