= Robin Griffith-Jones =

British priest

Robin Griffith-Jones (born 1956) is a Church of England priest, Master of the Temple in London and a lecturer in theology at King's College, London.

Griffith-Jones was educated at Westminster School and New College, Oxford, before working at Christie's for some years. He is a fellow of the Society of Antiquaries of London.

In 1999, Griffith-Jones was appointed Master of the Temple in London, the title given to the senior cleric of the Temple Church. His official style is currently "The Reverend and Valiant Master of the Temple". Prior to this he was chaplain of Lincoln College, Oxford, from 1992 to 1999 and a curate in Liverpool from 1989 to 1992. In 2026 he announced his retirement.

Griffith-Jones is the son of Mervyn Griffith-Jones, who was the prosecutor at the Lady Chatterley trial and the Common Serjeant of London at The Old Bailey.

In December 2015, Griffith-Jones appeared on the BBC's The Sky at Night, when the programme's topic was about the Star of Bethlehem, talking to Dallas Campbell.

Griffith-Jones is the brother of John Griffith-Jones.

== Books ==
- 2000: The Four Witnesses: The Rebel, the Rabbi, the Chronicler, and the Mystic. San Francisco: HarperSanFrancisco ISBN 978-0-06-251648-0
- 2004: The Gospel According to Paul: The Creative Genius Who Brought Jesus to the World. San Francisco: HarperSanFrancisco ISBN 0-06-073066-8
- 2006: The Da Vinci Code and the Secrets of the Temple: The Master of The Temple. Norwich: Canterbury Press ISBN 978-1-85311-731-2
- 2008: Mary Magdalene: The Woman whom Jesus Loved. Norwich: Canterbury Press ISBN 1-85311-818-4
