= Richard Du Cann =

British barrister (1929–1994)

Richard Du Cann QC (27 January 1929 – 4 August 1994) was a British barrister and judge. He worked as a criminal lawyer in defence and prosecution and later became a recorder (judge) in the Crown Court. Du Cann was involved with several significant cases such as the Lady Chatterley's Lover obscenity trial, one of the inquests into the death of Roberto Calvi, the Blue Arrow fraud trial and the trial of John Stonehouse MP for charges relating to his attempt to fake his own death. Du Cann also wrote a book, The Art of the Advocate, for the instruction of law students.

== Legal career ==
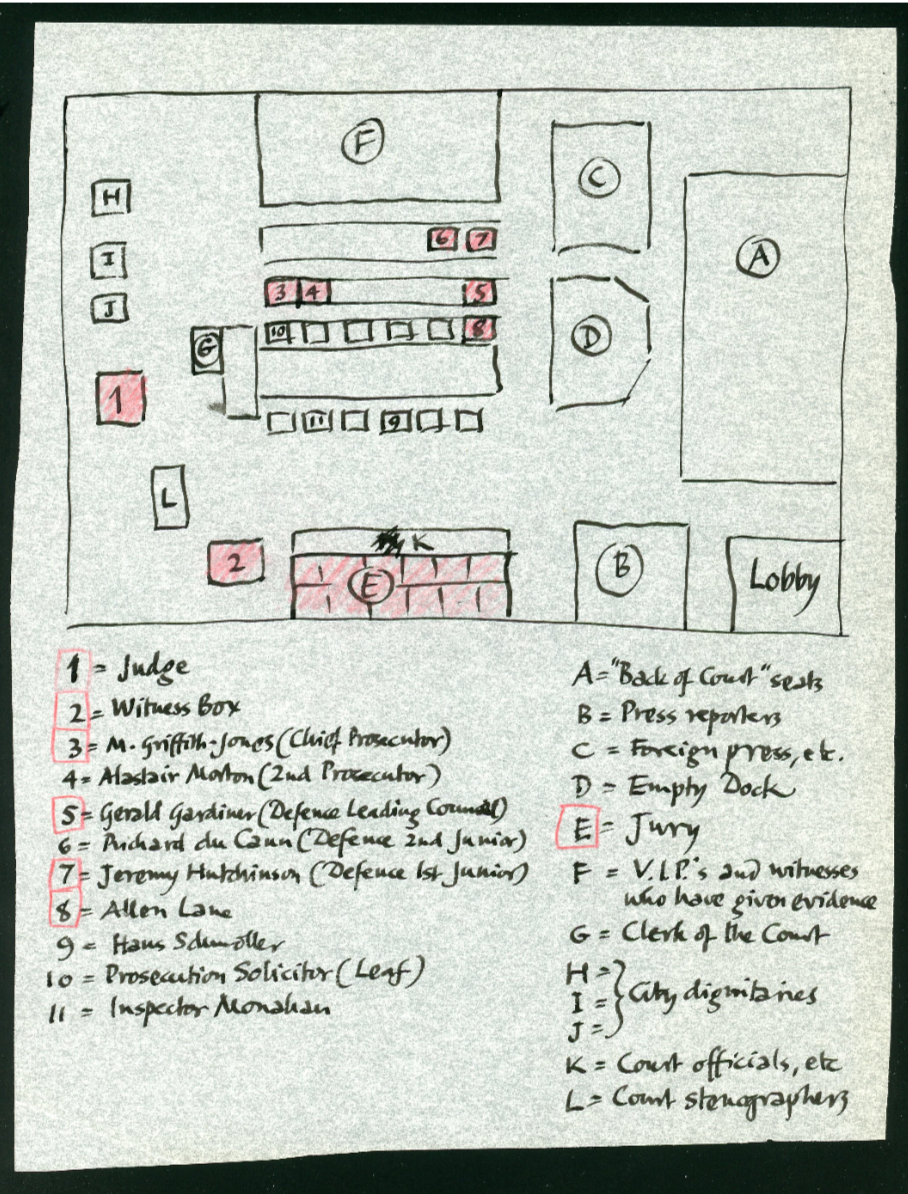
A diagram of the court during the Lady Chatterley's Lover trial, Du Cann's position as second junior defence counsel is marked as number 6.

Du Cann was born in London on 27 January 1929. He was educated at Steyning Grammar School in West Sussex and Clare College of the University of Cambridge. Du Cann followed in his father's footsteps to become a barrister and was pupilled to James Burge at the chambers of R.E. Seaton, practising in criminal law. He was called to the bar by Gray's Inn in 1953.

Du Cann served as Treasury counsel (prosecution barrister) for the Inner London quarter sessions from 1966 to 1970 and for the Central Criminal Court from 1970 to 1975 but also worked in defence. He became Queen's Counsel in 1975 and was chairman of the Criminal Bar Association from 1977 to 1980. Du Cann was elected a bencher of Gray's Inn in 1979 and from 1980 until 1981 served as chairman of the Bar of England and Wales. From 1982 until 1994 he was a recorder (judge) in the Crown Court.

Du Cann acted successfully for the defence in R v Penguin Books Ltd, the 1960 prosecution for obscenity over the 1929 novel Lady Chatterley's Lover, and in the obscenity trial of the 1972 film Last Tango in Paris. Du Cann was also involved in one of the inquests into the 1982 suspicious death of Italian banker Roberto Calvi and the 1992 Blue Arrow fraud trial. With Geoffrey Robertson he was appointed to defend British MP John Stonehouse in his trial for charges arising from an attempt to fake his own death in 1974. Stonehouse later dismissed Du Cann and Robertson and chose to represent himself, against Robertson's advice. Stonehouse was found guilty and sentenced to seven years' imprisonment.

== Personal life and legacy ==
Du Cann married Marley Sawtell in 1955. They went on to have two sons and two daughters; one son, Christian, also became a barrister. Du Cann wrote a book aimed at instructing law students, The Art of the Advocate, that was first published in 1964 and in a revised edition in 1993. From around 1977 Du Cann gave an annual lecture, focussing on professional standards, for the Council of Legal Education. He died in London on 4 August 1994, around a year after his retirement. His chambers of 40 years, now known as the Three Raymond Buildings, awards an annual Du Cann Prize for Excellence in Advocacy.
