= The Chatterley Affair =

2006 film

DVD cover

The Chatterley Affair is a BBC television drama produced by BBC Wales and broadcast on BBC Four on 20 March 2006. It is a semi-fictitious account of the obscenity trial which followed the publication of D. H. Lawrence's 1928 novel Lady Chatterley's Lover in 1960. Written by Andrew Davies and directed by James Hawes, it draws heavily, and accurately, on the court reporter's notes (published by Penguin as The Trial of Lady Chatterley) for scenes that take place within the courtroom but also presents entirely fictitious scenes involving the deliberations of jury members. Like all jury deliberations under English law, these were unmonitored when they took place.

The Chatterley Affair stars Louise Delamere and Rafe Spall as two fictional jurors who become lovers during the course of the trial with their brief relationship taking on, and reflecting aspects of, the novel's own narrative and themes. The script inverts the novel's central motif by showing a relationship between a worldly woman and a naive man, rather than the other way around.

Also portrayed are numerous real-life participants in the trial, such as judge Mr Justice Byrne (played here by Karl Johnson), prosecutor Mervyn Griffith-Jones (Pip Torrens), defence lawyer Gerald Gardiner (Donald Sumpter) and sociologist Richard Hoggart (David Tennant).

== Critical reception ==
Nancy Banks-Smith of The Guardian gave the film a positive review.
