= Barbara Wall (writer) =

English Catholic writer (1911–2009)

Barbara Wall (née Barbara Lucas; 1911 – 8 April 2009) was an English Catholic writer active in organizations linked to Catholic peace traditions. In 1972 she received the Benemerenti medal for her work for peace. She wrote under her maiden name, Barbara Lucas, and was a founder of the British version of The Catholic Worker. She also did numerous translations.

She was the wife of Bernard Wall, the mother of Bernardine Bishop and the grandmother of Matt Bishop.

== Partial bibliography ==
- Stars were Born (1936)
- The Trembling of the Sea (1938)
- Anna Collett (1948)
