= Bernardine Bishop =

English novelist, teacher and psychotherapist

Bernardine Anna Livia Mary Bishop (née Wall; 16 August 1939 – 4 July 2013) was an English novelist, teacher and psychotherapist. Her first novel, Perspectives, was published by Hutchinson in 1961. During a half-century break between publishing her first two novels and her third, the 2013 Costa prize-nominated Unexpected Lessons In Love, she brought up a family, taught, and practised as a psychotherapist.

Diagnosed with cancer of the colon in 2008, and subsequently forced to give up her psychotherapy work because of the illness, she reinvigorated her literary career by writing three novels, of which Unexpected Lessons In Love was the first. The book had only just been published when, having been informed that her condition was terminal, she decided to withdraw from chemotherapy and "turn her face towards Jerusalem". She died the following July.

== Life and career ==
=== Background and presence at the Lady Chatterley Trial ===
Bishop was born in London, England to a literary family. Her mother, Barbara Wall, a novelist and translator, and her father, Bernard, who wrote on Italian and Spanish history and culture, were leading Catholic thinkers of the day, entertaining a stream of literati including René Hague, Gavin Maxwell and Dylan Thomas at their Ladbroke Road home. The poet and suffragist Alice Meynell was a great-grandmother on her mother’s side.

She spent her formative years, during World War II, with her grandmother Madeline at Greatham, West Sussex, and was reunited with her parents in London following the cessation of hostilities. Bishop was educated at the Convent of Our Lady of Sion, Bayswater, west London, and Newnham College, Cambridge, where her lecturers in English included C. S. Lewis, E. M. Forster and F. R. Leavis. Her peers at Cambridge included David Frost and Peter Cook, and the novelist Margaret Drabble.

After graduating she became the youngest defence witness in the celebrated Lady Chatterley trial of 1960, when Penguin Books was prosecuted under the Obscene Publications Act for the publication of D. H. Lawrence’s Lady Chatterley's Lover. The last witness to be called, she appeared at the behest of Michael Rubinstein, a friend of the family and solicitor for Penguin Books, who believed her testimony would be sufficiently lucid and guileless to illustrate that reading the book had not corrupted her.

Presented as a fresh-faced convent girl, Bishop was asked by defence counsel, Gerald Gardner QC, whether she was already familiar with the four-letter words in the book. She assured him that she had known all those terms before reading it, and went on to tell the court that the expurgated version had very little literary merit, "because it is not the book Lawrence wrote… treating that very important human relationship with great dignity."

Bishop later said in an interview with The Oldie magazine, "It was a simple syllogism for me. Good writers should not be censored; Lawrence was a good writer; Lawrence should not be censored."

=== First marriage and published work ===
In 1961 Bishop married the pianist Stephen Bishop (later known as Stephen Kovacevich) and published her first novel. Perspectives, centred around the youthful staff of a fictitious London-based political magazine, was described by Guardian reviewer Isabel Quigly as “an extremely bright book, opening one's eyes to all sorts of aspects of youth”.

Playing House, a more serious work concerning the sexual mores of two couples, followed in 1963 and demonstrated a growing interest in psychoanalysis, particularly Melanie Klein’s reading of object relations theory.

Bishop also appeared on the BBC literary quiz show Take It Or Leave It alongside Anthony Burgess and John Betjeman, but personal circumstances would militate against her expanding her literary canon. Following the end of her marriage she took a job as an English teacher, first in Westbourne Park and then in Holloway, to support herself and her two young sons, Matthew (Matt Bishop, now a director of the Aston Martin Formula 1 team) and Francis (Francis 'Foff' Bishop, a West Sussex fireman). There was no time for writing with two toddlers to attend to: “They don’t even let you read the paper.”

Between her separation from Stephen Bishop in 1965 and the annulment of their marriage in 1967, Bishop underwent a period of tremendous stress, during which she sought relief through psychotherapy. Inspired by this, she decided to train as a psychotherapist herself, continuing to teach English part-time. She said of her time in the education profession that her greatest achievement had been to instil in the pupils, drawn from working class areas of north London, a love of Shakespeare.

=== Second marriage and work as a psychotherapist ===
In 1981 she married Bill Chambers, a mathematics lecturer at the University of London, and afterwards became a psychotherapist at the London Centre for Psychotheraphy. There she co-wrote a series of four books on psychotherapy published by Karnac in the Practice of Psychotherapy series, and wrote eight scientific papers, five of which were published in the British Journal of Psychotherapy. The papers, chiefly concerned with exploring psychoanalytic understandings through literature, attracted large audiences. She was, according to an appreciation published in the Journal after her death, an active contributor on all fronts, chairing committees with kindness and empathy. Her highly esteemed paper on Shakespeare’s Othello, Faith And Doubt In The Good Object, was selected for the celebratory edition of the British Journal’s papers.

=== Diagnosis with cancer of the colon and return to writing ===
Ill health, following her diagnosis with cancer of the colon in 2008, ultimately forced her to retire from her work as a therapist but led to a reflowering of her literary career. Believing herself to be in remission, she took up the pen and wrote three further novels before her condition returned and was pronounced terminal in 2012, ending, in her words, a period of "happy uncertainty" in her life.

Unexpected Lessons In Love was published in 2013, with the encouragement of Margaret Drabble, who described it as "one of the most enjoyable books I’ve read in years" because it confronted "one of the last taboos of modern life" with a lightness of touch. It draws on Bishop’s life experiences in that the principal character, Cecilia, is a retired psychotherapist living with cancer, although Bishop herself said that she and Cecilia were not one and the same; her cat, Sidney, was the only real-life character in the novel.

"I remember the delight at being in control of my own story again," wrote Bishop in her Author’s Note at the end of the novel. "During my treatment for cancer, the endless hospital appointments, the chemo and radiotherapy sessions, the agony of waiting for results, of sitting in front of doctors who knew more than I did about my future, I ceded authority to others. Now at my desk, I took it back. Cancer was one journey; my book would be another."

=== Critical response to final three novels ===
The Spectator described Unexpected Lessons In Love as "a wonderful novel, one of those rare books which leaves the reader with a deeper understanding of the human heart". It was shortlisted in the Best Novel category of the Costa Book Awards, and described by the judges as an "unflinching, darkly funny story of love, obsession and illness that is unexpected in every way".

"Witty, original and empathetic, the novel explores many forms of love, particularly the maternal bond," wrote Pamela Norris in the Literary Review, "but what gripped readers was Bishop’s candid discussion of physical issues, from the pros and cons of the opaque colostomy bag to the perplexities of sex after surgery."

Her final two novels would be published posthumously, Hidden Knowledge in 2014 and The Street in 2015. While Unexpected Lessons In Love was praised for its deft and often humorous handling of difficult subject matter, Hidden Knowledge is a darker work. In it Bishop sets up a number of seemingly parallel narratives in order to explore, in her words, "The things people do not know about themselves, the things they cannot face."

The book’s handling of contentious issues – one narrative thread concerns a predatory paedophile priest, and a mother’s attempts to learn more about his role in her son’s death – impressed critics.

"Apparently clear-cut moral distinctions constantly blur," wrote Gerard Woodward in The Guardian. "The themes Bishop deals with are so complex and nuanced it is unsurprising that she spends so much time describing her characters' state of mind. If there is an occasional sense that characters are more talked about than talking, this is still an extraordinarily brave and powerful novel, and one that pins down the darker aspects of human experience with a precision beyond most writers."

"Like Hardy and Shakespeare, Bishop relishes coincidence and the unexpected quirks of fate," wrote Norris in the Literary Review. "This gives the novel a welcome lightness and sense of irony, despite its tragic undertones."

The Street documents the intertwined lives of the residents of an ordinary suburban street, exploring the notion of community. "This lovely, surprising novel is the very last by Bernardine Bishop, who died in 2013," wrote Kate Saunders in The Times. "Like her novel Unexpected Lessons in Love, it is filled with life and optimism and a wicked sense of comedy. Characters find each other in ways that seem random, until it all falls into place at the deeply satisfying ending."

=== Final months ===
After completing what would be her final novel, The Street, Bishop was informed that her condition was terminal. "All the energy went out of me at that point and I felt dreadfully poor and sad and I haven’t written since," she said in a March 2013 interview. "I would have liked to have had a few more years. I would have liked a couple more novels."

Having elected to give up chemotherapy and "turn her face towards Jerusalem", she spent her final months reconnecting with old friends and acquaintances, thereby avoiding the need for a final stint in hospital or hospice, and reconciling herself with her fate. Bishop’s mother had lived to be 97, and her end was "not a pleasure. A lively-minded, still active woman became deaf as a post and simply could not participate. Well, I shall escape all that."

== Novels ==
- Perspectives (1961)
- Playing House (1963)
- Unexpected Lessons In Love (2013)
- Hidden Knowledge (2014, posthumous)
- The Street (2015, posthumous)
