= Matthew Bishop =

Matthew Bishop is the name of:

- Matthew Bishop (footballer) (born 1975), former Australian rules footballer
- Matthew Bishop (journalist), economics journalist and writer
- Matt Bishop (journalist)
- Matt Bishop (politician), British politician
