= John Thomas and Lady Jane =

1927 novel by D. H. Lawrence, later rewritten as Lady Chatterley's Lover

- 1961 Italian edition
- Author: D. H. Lawrence
- Language: English
- Publication date: 1927

John Thomas and Lady Jane is a 1927 novel by D. H. Lawrence. The novel is the second, less widely known, version of a story that was later told in the more famous, once-controversial, third version Lady Chatterley's Lover, published in 1928. John Thomas and Lady Jane are the pet names for the genitalia of the protagonists.

"The book, according to a statement from Ferran, is a more simple, direct telling of the tale, with a few key differences. Parkin, the gamekeeper, is here a simple man from the village who chose his profession over being a miner, so that he could preserve his solitude. In the 1928 novel, he’s named Mellors and, though working-class, is a former army officer." — Moira Macdonald, Seattle Times arts critic

== Publication ==
This version originally published as an Italian translation Le Tre "Lady Chatterley". Milano: Mondadori, 1954.

- D. H. Lawrence, The First Lady Chatterley (The first version of 'Lady Chatterley's Lover) with a foreword by Frieda Lawrence (Heinemann, 1972)
- D. H. Lawrence, John Thomas and Lady Jane (The second version of 'Lady Chatterley's Lover) (Heinemann, 1972).

The book was also published in a volume entitled The First and Second Lady Chatterley Novels with the first version of the story, The First Lady Chatterley.

== Reception ==
The New Republic said, "What is left makes the second version a better book, for while freer from polemics about the perils of industrialization, it is dramatic and sensitively realistic about the emotional and economic wasteland in which the lives of colliers and foundrymen and their families are lived."

== Adaptation ==
In 1981, some material from this book was used for Keith Miles's stage version at the Belgrade Theatre in Coventry, England, and later performed by the Buffalo Theatre Ensemble at the Theatre Building in Chicago.

In 1993, some material from this book was used for the Ken Russell television mini-series Lady Chatterley.

In 2006, it was used as the basis of a French film adaptation called Lady Chatterley, directed by Pascale Ferran.

== Bibliography ==
- Lawrence, David Herbert (1972). Gant, Roland (ed.). John Thomas and Lady Jane. Viking Press. ISBN 978-0-670-40812-2. OCLC 1072423200.
- Lawrence, David Herbert (1973). John Thomas and Lady Jane : the second version of Lady Chatterley's lover. Harmondsworth: Penguin. ISBN 0140037322. OL 22127736M – via Open Library.
- Lawrence, David Herbert (1972). The first Lady Chatterley : the first version of Lady Chatterley's lover. London : Heinemann. ISBN 978-0-434-40736-1.

== Parody ==
Comedian Spike Milligan parodied the story in his According to Spike Milligan series, under the title of D. H. Lawrence's John Thomas and Lady Jane – Part II of Lady Chatterley's Lover.
