= James Hemming =

British child psychologist, educationalist, and humanist

- Born: 9 September 1909; Ashton-under-Lyne
- Died: 25 December 2007 (aged 98); Kingston upon Thames
- Occupations: Child psychologist, educationalist, humanist
- Spouse(s): Taylor (m. 1928, divorced) Kay (m. 1945; died 1993)

Clifford James Hemming (9 September 1909 – 25 December 2007) was a British child psychologist, educationalist and humanist.

== Biography ==
Born in Ashton-under-Lyne, James Hemming's childhood education was patchy, and he later obtained his BA via a correspondence course run by Birkbeck College, London.

Hemming taught at schools in Bristol, Bournemouth and at Isleworth grammar school, Middlesex. On the outbreak of the second world war, Hemming taught English and PE at Isleworth.

In 1945, Hemming married Kay, another teacher. She died in 1993.

James Hemming died in Kingston Hospital, Kingston upon Thames, leaving an estate worth £1,615,879 net. Beneficiaries from his will included Oxfam, National Children's Bureau, Amnesty International UK, Friends of the Earth, World Wide Fund for Nature, Greenpeace, Cancer Research Campaign, British Humanist Association, Arthritis and Rheumatism Council, Unicef, and the Adlerian Society for Individual Psychology.

== Writing and activism ==
James appeared as a defence witness in the Penguin Books obscenity trial of Lady Chatterley's Lover in 1960.

Hemming was a regular panel member on the 1970s BBC programme If You Think You've Got Problems.

=== Politics ===
Around 1942–46 Hemming was involved with Common Wealth, a socialist political party. Later he was active in local Labour Party politics, and was a member of the Green Alliance.

=== Teaching and education ===
He was a governor of St. Georges in the East secondary modern school and Mayfield Girls' Secondary School (now closed).

He launched a campaign against the use of the cane, and was an advocate for sex education. He opposed the introduction of Section 28, declaring in 1987 that homosexuality was "morally acceptable as a way of life".

Hemming had a particular interest in moral education, from a humanist perspective, and was active in the work of the Campaign for Moral Education and the Social Morality Council (later The Norham Foundation). He served on the executive committee of the Social Morality Council and was on the editorial board of its journal, Journal of Moral Education. He was a member of the Television Research Committee, set up to investigate the impact of mass media on the moral development of young people.

The Times Educational Supplement described Hemming as "one of the drivers behind the introduction of personal, social and health education.

He also spent some time lecturing in Africa, and wrote widely used books for schools. He was educational adviser to the World Education Fellowship.

=== Eagle comic ===
Hemming was involved in the launch of The Eagle. Hemming wrote,

I came in on Eagle originally because Johnny Metcalfe of Colman, Prentis & Varley rang me up to know if I was interested in the project. I was drawn in to taking the original dummy around to show the teacher and head teacher organisations. We met first around then. The launch complete, you asked me to stay linked as your consultant. So there we, very pleasantly, were. As for those early days, there was the sheer miracle of Eagle appearing regularly as, for months, perforce, we had no time in hand. Then there was the solid identification and teamwork that somehow got the work done week by week.

=== Humanism ===
A member since its formation in 1963, Hemming was President of the British Humanist Association from 1977 to 1980, and vice-president until his death. He served on the BHA's Education Committee for 30 years (c1966s–1998) and was a humanist representative on the Religious Education Council of England and Wales (1980s–1990s). He was also an honorary associate of the Rationalist Association and a vice-president of the Gay and Lesbian Humanist Association.

He was a signatory to Humanist Manifesto II (1973).

The James Hemming Essay Prize was established in 2009 and is administered by the British Humanist Association, New Humanist magazine and the South Place Ethical Society. The inaugural prizes were awarded in August 2009.

== Works ==
=== Books and pamphlets ===
- The Problem of Child Crime. (1944). (Common Wealth Popular Library, no. 6).
- (with Josephine Balls) The Child is Right – a Challenge to Parents and Other Adults. (1945). London: Longmans, Green.
- The teaching of social studies in secondary schools. (1949). London: Longmans.
- Mankind against the killers. (1956). London: Longmans, Green.
- Problems of Adolescent Girls. (1960, 2nd ed 1967).
- Adolescents and Society. (1962). (Arthur Mellows Memorial Lecture).
- Understand yourself and other people. (1966). Oxford: Blackwell.
- The psychology of adolescence: nine lectures. (1966).
- Individual Morality. (1969).
- (with Howard Marratt).Humanism and Christianity: the common ground of moral education: a consideration. (1969). Isleworth: H. Marratt.
- The alternative society. (1969). (Conway Memorial Lecture).
- Sex Education in Schools
- (with Zena Maxwell). Sex and Love. (1972). London: Heinemann Educational .
- You and Your Adolescent. (1975).
- The Betrayal of Youth: secondary education must be changed. (1980). London: Marion Boyars.
- Instead of God: Pragmatic Reconsideration of Beliefs and Values. (1986).

=== Articles ===
- "Agony Aunties and Their Contribution to Health Education (a) The Search for Reassurance." The Journal of the Royal Society for the Promotion of Health, Vol.92 (5), 1972, pp. 246–249.
- "Another Prospect on Moral Education" Journal of Moral Education, Vol.9 (2), 1980, pp. 75–80.
- "Why I am an atheist", New Humanist, Vol.100 (4), Autumn, 1985, pp. 32–33.
- "Physiology of moral maturity", Journal of Moral Education, Vol.20 (2), 1991, pp. 127–137.
- "The Living Cosmos", New Humanist, Vol.109 (2), 1993, pp. 7–8.
- "Morality after myth". Journal of Moral Education, Vol.25 (1), 1996, pp. 39–45.

== Bibliography ==
- McLean, Ruari (1995). "Typography and parsons", Matrix (UK), no.15, Winter, pp. 56–62.
