= Laurence Byrne =

British High Court judge (1896–1965)

Sir Lawrence Austin Byrne (17 September 1896 – 1 November 1965), also known as Laurence Byrne, was a barrister and High Court judge. He is perhaps best known for the prosecution of William Joyce ("Lord Haw-Haw") in 1945, and as the presiding judge in the case of R v Penguin Books Ltd. in 1960, the prosecution of Penguin Books under the Obscene Publications Act 1959 for the publication of D. H. Lawrence's Lady Chatterley's Lover.

== Biography ==
Byrne was born into a wealthy Irish Catholic family at Cronybyrne House (Croneybyrne House), near Rathdrum, County Wicklow. He served as a lieutenant in the Queen's Royal West Surrey Regiment in the First World War. He married in 1928.

He was called to the bar at Middle Temple in 1918 and quickly became known for his skill as an advocate in criminal cases. Starting as a defence barrister, he was soon asked to undertake prosecutions for the Crown at the Old Bailey, where he was particularly active during the 1930s and 1940s. He was offered the position of Director of Public Prosecutions in 1944 when Sir Edward Atkinson retired, but declined; Atkinson's successor, Sir Theobald Mathew, was responsible for authorising the prosecution of Penguin Books in 1960. With Attorney General Sir Hartley Shawcross and Gerald Howard, he was one of three barrister for the prosecution in the trial of William Joyce (Lord Haw-Haw) in 1945.

He became Recorder of Rochester in 1939, and then became a High Court judge in 1945, being first assigned to the Probate, Divorce and Admiralty Division before moving to the King's Bench Division in 1947. In the case of R v Clarke in 1949, he held that a man who was judicially separated from his wife could be guilty of raping his wife, as an exception to a common law rule that was not overturned until the R v R case in 1991.

The Penguin Books case was the last at which Byrne presided. He retired in 1960 and lived in Enniskerry in Ireland before moving to Essex in 1964, where he died at Gosfield Hall.
