= Australian Copyright Council =

Australian Copyright Council (ACC) is an Australian non-profit organisation established in 1968 whose purpose is to promote understanding of copyright law in Australia.

== Affiliates ==
As of November 2021 the following organisations were affiliated with the Australian Copyright Council:

- Aboriginal Artist Agency Limited
- Australian Recording Industry Association
- Australian Society of Authors
- Australasian Music Publishers Association
- Australian Writers' Guild
- Australia New Zealand Screen Association
- Ausdance
- Australian Publishers Association
- Australian Screen Directors Authorship Collecting Society
- Australian Institute of Architects
- Australian Music Centre
- Australian Institute of Professional Photographers
- APRA AMCOS
- Big Studio Movie Licence
- Copyright Agency Limited
- Media Entertainment & Arts Alliance
- National Association for the Visual Arts
- National Tertiary Education Industry Union
- Phonographic Performance Company of Australia
- Screen Producers Association of Australia
- Screenrights
