= Mervyn Griffith-Jones =

British judge and barrister

Mervyn Griffith-Jones CBE MC
- Born: John Mervyn Guthrie Griffith-Jones; 1 July 1909; London, England
- Died: 13 July 1979 (aged 70); London, England
- Education: Eton College; Trinity Hall, Cambridge
- Spouse: Joan Clare Baker
- Children: 3, including John and Robin
- Parent: John Griffith-Jones

John Mervyn Guthrie Griffith-Jones CBE MC (1 July 1909 – 13 July 1979) was a British judge and former barrister. He led the prosecution of Penguin Books in the obscenity trial in 1960 following the publication of D. H. Lawrence's Lady Chatterley's Lover. His much quoted remark in his opening statement as to whether the novel was something "you would even wish your wife or servants to read" is often cited as representing the extent to which the British establishment had fallen out of touch with popular opinion at the time. He failed to convince the jury at the Chatterley trial, and the publishers were acquitted.

== Early life ==
Griffith-Jones was born in Hampstead, London. His father, John Stanley Phillips Griffith-Jones (1877/8–1949), was also a barrister. He was educated at Eton College and Trinity Hall, Cambridge, and was called to the Bar at Middle Temple in 1932, specialising in criminal law. He served with the Coldstream Guards during the Second World War, and was awarded the Military Cross in 1943. After the war, he was one of the British prosecuting counsel at the Nuremberg Trials (as Junior Counsel).

== Post-war legal career ==
He returned to the bar when he left the Army in October 1946 and became a specialist prosecuting counsel. He was counsel for the Crown at the north London quarter sessions from 1946 to 1950, and then at the Central Criminal Court at the Old Bailey from 1950 to 1964. He became senior Treasury counsel in 1959, and became a founder member of the Criminal Law Revision Committee that year.

In 1955, he was junior counsel to Christmas Humphreys for the prosecution of Ruth Ellis, the last woman to be hanged in the UK. He was known for prosecuting obscenity cases. At the 1954 trial of Walter Baxter and Heinemann for publishing Baxter's 1953 novel The Image and the Search, he asked jurors whether they would give the novel as a Christmas present "to the girls in the office; and if not, why not?", prefiguring the fateful question he posed at the opening of the Chatterley trial in 1960. Baxter and his publisher were acquitted.

He led the prosecution of Penguin Books for publishing Lady Chatterley's Lover in paperback format in the obscenity trial held at the Old Bailey from 20 October to 2 November 1960. The book was prosecuted under the Obscene Publications Act 1959, a private members bill introduced by Roy Jenkins, under which a work was considered in its entirety, and had a defence if it was justified by the public good. He asked jurors not to approach the novel "in any priggish, high-minded, super-correct mid-Victorian manner", but alleged that the novel induced "lustful thoughts in the minds of those who read it", and then asked, "...when you have read it through, would you approve of your young sons, young daughters – because girls can read as well as boys – reading this book? Is it a book that you would have lying around in your own house? Is it a book that you would even wish your wife or your servants to read?" The jury reportedly found this question amusing, and it has been described as the "first nail in the prosecution's coffin". A procession of eminent defence witnesses attested to the worth of the novel, and Penguin Books was acquitted of obscenity on 2 November.

In 1963 he was the prosecuting counsel in the trial of Stephen Ward, who was accused of living off the immoral earnings of Christine Keeler and Mandy Rice-Davies following the Profumo affair. Ward took a drugs overdose on the last day of the trial, and died on 3 August after being convicted in his absence.

After serving as recorder of Grantham and of Coventry, he became a full-time judge in 1964, presiding over criminal cases at the Old Bailey as the Common Serjeant of London until 1979.

== Outside the law ==
Griffith-Jones was a councillor in Westminster City Council from 1948 to 1954, and became a Lord Lieutenant in the City of London in 1967. He was appointed CBE in 1977. He was also an accomplished artist and held three exhibitions in London in the 1970s.

He married Joan Clare Baker at St Peter's, Pimlico, in January 1947. They had a daughter and two sons. He died of renal failure at St Stephen's Hospital (now rebuilt as Chelsea and Westminster Hospital) in Chelsea in 1979, aged 70, survived by his wife and children. His son, Robin Griffith-Jones, is the current Reverend and Valiant Master of the Temple. Griffith-Jones's aunt, Anne Griffith-Jones, founded the Tanglin Trust School, Singapore.

== Portrayal in popular culture ==
Mervyn Griffith-Jones has been portrayed by the following actors in film, television and theatre productions;

- Jonathan Newth in the 1984 British film Champions
- Daniel Massey in the 1989 British film Scandal
- Pip Torrens in the 2006 British television production The Chatterley Affair
- Paul Hickey in the 2006 British television docudrama Nuremberg: Nazis on Trial
- Anthony Calf in the 2013 West End musical Stephen Ward
- Alex Macqueen in the 2020 British television drama The Trial of Christine Keeler
