= Australian Society of Authors =

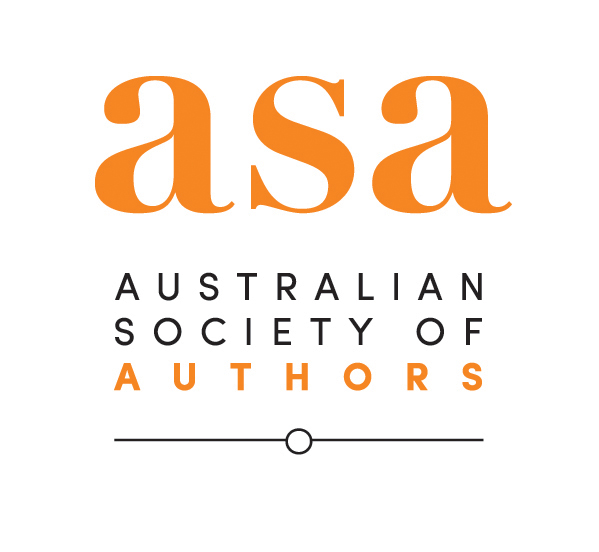
ASA logo

The Australian Society of Authors (ASA) was formed in 1963 as the organisation to promote and protect the rights of Australia's authors and illustrators. The Fellowship of Australian Writers played a key role it its establishment. The organisation established Public Lending Right (PLR) in 1975 and Educational Lending Right (ELR) in 2000. The ASA was also instrumental in setting up Copyright Agency, the Australian Copyright Council and the International Authors Forum.

The ASA provides information and advice on all aspects of writing and publishing. It administers several awards, including the ASA Medal, the Barbara Jefferis Award, the ASA/HQ Commercial Fiction Prize, Blake-Beckett Trust Scholarship, and the Varuna Ray Koppe Young Writers Residency.

== Founding ==
In October 1962 the President of the Fellowship of Australian Writers, Walter Stone, invited delegates from all other writers' societies to a meeting in Sydney to discuss the formation of a national organisation to represent professional authors. A series of meetings followed culminating in the formation of the ASA on 15 May 1963, and the acceptance of a provisional constitution on 26 June 1963.

Miles Franklin Award winning author Dal Stivens became the founding President of the ASA in 1963.

The poet Jill Hellyer was the first Executive Secretary and received an honorarium of £10 a week. Her home in Mt Colah became the ASA's first official address. Vice presidents were the novelist Morris West and the critic and sometime publisher P.R. ("Inky") Stephensen. The treasurer was bookseller A.W. Sheppard, and printer Walter Stone was the editor of the new society's journal Broadside (which would later become Australian Author). Other authors on the first committee and council included Nancy Cato, Nan Chauncy, C.B. Christesen, Joan Clarke, Dymphna Cusack, Frank Dalby Davison, Mary Durack Miller, John K. Ewers, Sir Keith Hancock, Xavier Herbert, A. D. Hope, Leonard Mann, Alan Marshall, David Martin, T. Inglis Moore, John O'Grady, Roland Robinson, Colin Simpson, Douglas Stewart, Judith Wright, Betty Roland, and Alan Yates.

== Campaigns and services ==
The ASA's first campaign was to abolish the "colonial royalty", by which Australian authors published by British publishers were paid a 10% royalty on book sales in the UK but only a 5% royalty on books sold in Australia, which were considered "export sales". There were also campaigns for an "open market" for books in Australia in an attempt to break the monopoly of British publishers.

The ASA also crusaded to convince a succession of governments that Public Lending Right (PLR) is legitimate recompense to authors for loss of sales when their books are held in Australian public libraries. In 1975, PLR was finally brought in. However, for another 25 years the ASA continued to cajole, argue and lobby for Educational Lending Right (ELR) to be introduced. Efforts were finally rewarded in 2000 when ELR was included as part of the Howard government's GST compensation package to the book industry. The PLR scheme makes payments to eligible Australian creators and publishers whose books are held in public lending libraries, while the ELR scheme makes similar payments for books held in educational libraries.

The ASA successfully campaigned for the government to expand PLR / ELR payments to include digital formats: ebooks and audiobooks with $12.9m announced for DLR (digital lending rights) in 2023.

== Copyright ==
The ASA was instrumental in setting up Copyright Agency, which pays creators whose work is copied under statutory licence. This work has resulted in payments of around $100 million distributed to Australian creators every year. The ASA also helped set up the Australian Copyright Council which provides information to the public on intellectual property issues.

The ASA has regularly defended authors against various governments' moves to remove territorial copyright on books. Known as "parallel importation", the repeal of territorial copyright would see a contraction of the Australian publishing industry and ultimately fewer opportunities for Australian authors to achieve publication and meaningful remuneration for their books.

== Awards ==
The ASA Medal is awarded to an Australian author or illustrator "who has made an outstanding contribution to Australian culture as both a creator and an advocate". The inaugural medal went to Anita Heiss in 2002; other recipients include Thomas Keneally (2019), Edel Wignell (2017), Valerie Parv (2014), Nadia Wheatley (2014), Robert Pullan (2012), Hazel Edwards (2009), Glenda Adams (2007), Inga Clendinnen (2005), and Tim Winton (2003).

The ASA administers the Barbara Jefferis Award, which is funded from a bequest from the late John Hinde in tribute to his wife, who was a founding member of the Society. The award was first presented in 2008 (to Rhyll McMaster for her book Feather Man (2007).

It also administers the annual Blake-Beckett Trust Scholarship, worth $20,000; the Varuna Ray Koppe Young Writers Residency; and, since 2020, the ASA/HQ Commercial Fiction Prize.

=== Authors' bequests ===
The Society received a bequest of the copyright of author Mouni Sadhu (Mieczyslaw Sudowski) in 1972 and currently administers the rights for the works of this author. In 2008, the ASA was bequeathed the literary estate of founder Dal Stivens by his heir Juanita Cragen. In July 2013, Edel Wignell bequeathed her writing earnings and copyright to the ASA.

== Structure and governance ==
The society has over 3,000 members, and a staff of six based in the society-owned building in Ultimo, an inner city suburb of Sydney.

As of November 2022 Olivia Lanchester is CEO and Sophie Cunningham is chair. Other board members include Kelly Gardiner (deputy chair), Kirsty Murray, Sarah Ayoub, Bronwyn Bancroft, Danielle Clode, Jock Given, Malcolm Knox, Jennifer Mills, and Nicholas Pickard.

== Publications ==
- Australian Society of Authors (1981), Newsletter, The Society
- Australian Society of Authors (1969), The Australian author, Australian Society of Authors, ISSN 0045-026X

== Records ==
Australian Society of Authors; Australian Writers' Guild (1963), Records of the Australian Society of Authors, 1963-circa 1999

== See also ==
- AuthorShare
