= Stephen Kovacevich =

American musician (1940–2026)

Kovacevich in 1970

Stephen Kovacevich (October 17, 1940 – October 27, 2026) was an American classical pianist and conductor. Particularly celebrated for his recordings of works by Beethoven, Bartók, and Schubert, he was known for technical skill, clarity of playing, and an intelligent approach to interpretation.

== Early life ==
Stephen Kovacevich was born in San Pedro, Los Angeles, California, on October 17, 1940, to a Croatian father and an American mother. When his mother remarried, his name was changed to Stephen Bishop, the name under which he performed in his early career. He later discovered that he was often being confused with the singer and guitarist Stephen Bishop. To avoid the confusion, he began performing as Stephen Bishop-Kovacevich and later simply as Stephen Kovacevich.

== Career ==
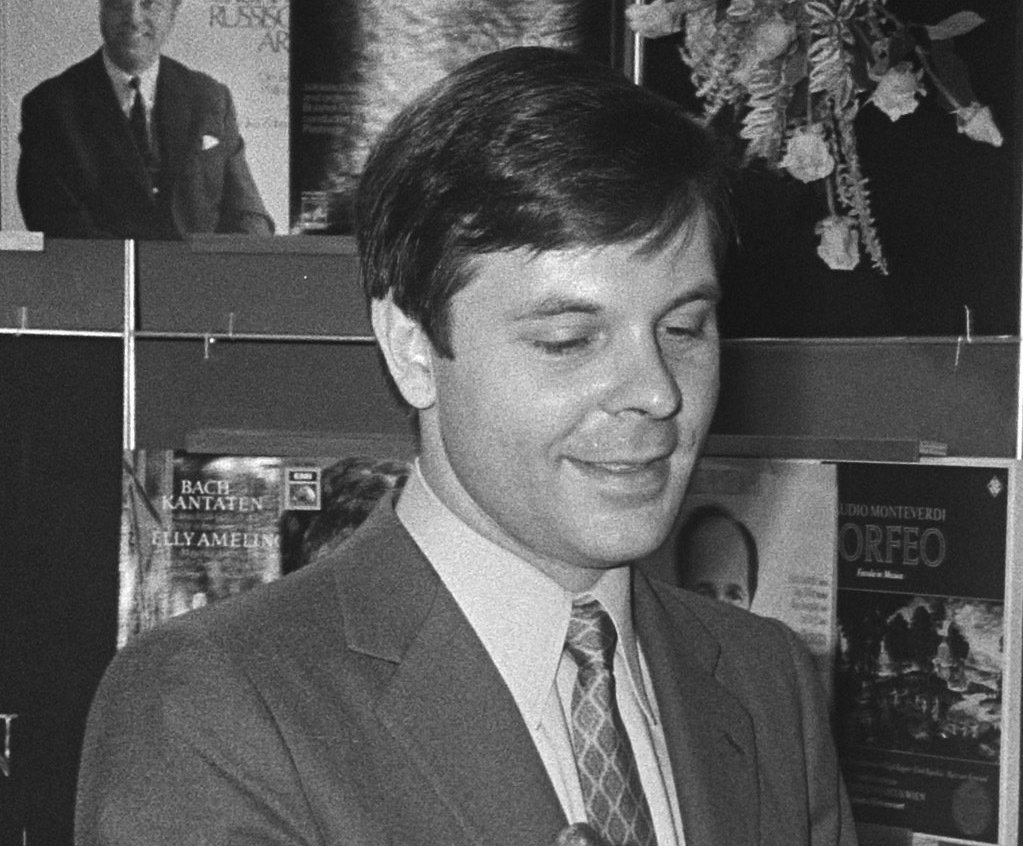
Kovacevich in 1970

He made his concert debut as a pianist at the age of 11; then, at the age of 18 he moved to London to study under Dame Myra Hess on a scholarship and was a London resident ever since, living in Hampstead. In 1961 he made a notable European debut at the Wigmore Hall, playing the Piano Sonata by Alban Berg, three Bach Preludes and Fugues and Beethoven's Diabelli Variations. He also toured Britain with Jacqueline du Pré. In 1967, he made his New York debut and since then he toured Europe, the United States, the Far East, Australia, New Zealand and South America. As a soloist and conductor, he frequently performed and recorded works by, amongst others, Mozart, Beethoven, Schubert, Brahms and Bartók. In later years, he performed works by Rachmaninoff.

Kovacevich often performed chamber works; his chamber music partners included Jacqueline du Pré, Martha Argerich, Steven Isserlis, Nigel Kennedy, Lynn Harrell, Sarah Chang, Gautier Capuçon, Renaud Capuçon and Emmanuel Pahud.

Aside from his performing career, Kovacevich gave master classes and recitals at Dartington International Summer School for many years.

== Selected recordings ==
After Kovacevich's death, critic David Hurwitz suggested the following list of five recordings as a "starter kit" of Kovacevich's work:

- Beethoven: Piano Concertos Nos. 4 & 5 (Decca, 2011) – Hurwitz listed Concerto No. 4 from this recording
- Schubert: Piano Sonata No. 21 in B flat major (Warner Classics, 1994)
- Bartók Piano Concertos Nos. 1-3 (Decca, 2000) – with Colin Davis and the London Symphony Orchestra
- Brahms Piano Concertos 1 & 2 Stephen Kovacevich (Decca, 2005) – with Davis and the London Symphony Orchestra
- Beethoven: Diabelli Variations / Bach: Partita No. 4 (Onyx, 2009) – Hurwitz listed the Diabelli Variations from this recording

== Personal life ==
From 1961 to 1967, Kovacevich was married to novelist and psychotherapist Bernardine Bishop, née Wall (1939–2013). They had two sons, Matt Bishop and Francis "Foff" Bishop.

In the 1970s, Kovacevich had a relationship with pianist Martha Argerich, with whom he performed. They had a daughter, Stéphanie. Later, in the mid-1980s, Kovacevich had a relationship with Basia Janowska, an artist and illustrator. They had a son, Milan.

Kovacevich died on October 27, 2026, at a hospital in London, at the age of 86. He had been recovering from hip surgery at the time of his death.
