= John Griffith-Jones =

British accountant (born 1954)

John Griffith-Jones DL
- Born: 11 May 1954 (age 72)
- Education: Eton College; Trinity Hall, Cambridge
- Spouse: Cathryn Mary Stone
- Children: 1 son, 1 daughter
- Parent(s): Mervyn Griffith-Jones; Joan Baker

John Guthrie Griffith-Jones DL (born 11 May 1954) is a British accountant. He was chairman of the Financial Conduct Authority.

== Early life ==
John Griffith-Jones was born on 11 May 1954. He is the son of Mervyn Griffith-Jones and Joan Baker. He was educated at Eton College, and he earned a bachelor of arts degree from Trinity Hall, Cambridge in 1975.

== Career ==
Griffith-Jones worked for KPMG from 1975 to 2012. He was the chairman of its Europe, Middle East, Africa and India division from 2008 to 2012.

Griffith-Jones was a director and deputy chairman of the Financial Services Authority from 2012 to 2013. Between April 2013 and April 2018 he served as the chairman of the Financial Conduct Authority.

Griffith-Jones served on the advisory board of the Cambridge Judge Business School from 2008 to 2016.

Griffith-Jones has been the Chair of StepChange Debt Charity since January 2019.

He was appointed a Deputy Lieutenant of Essex in 2019.

== Personal life ==
Griffith-Jones married Cathryn Mary Stone in 1990. They have a son and a daughter.
