= Jill Hellyer =

Australian poet (1925–2012)

- Born: April 1925 Sydney, Australia
- Died: December 2012 (aged 86–87) Goulburn, Australia
- Occupation: poet, novelist

Jill Hellyer (1925–2012) was an Australian poet and writer, and one of the founding members of the Australian Society of Authors. She was awarded an Order of Australia Medal (OAM) for services to Australian poetry.

== Biography ==
Jill Hellyer was born in 1925 in Sydney, Australia, to parents Harold and Ruby. Her father died when Jill was a child, followed by her elder brother Allan, who died of a chronic illness in his teenage years. Jill's mother, Ruby, was diagnosed with leukaemia and died when Jill was 12. Jill was sent to live with two unmarried aunts in the Sydney suburb of Seaforth, who raised her until adulthood and inspired several of her better-known poems, including "Living With Aunts", which is included in The Puncher and Wattman anthology of Australian Poetry. She attended North Sydney Girls High School.

An avid writer throughout her life, Jill Hellyer was a consistent contributor of poetry and prose to literary magazines such as Southerly, Overland, Meanjin and Heat. She helped to establish the Australian Society of Authors and was its foundation secretary from 1963 to 1971. In her 1989 auto-biographical piece "The luxury of Dreaming" she hints that the title she was given of 'part-time secretary' did not properly reflect the work that she had put into the organisation. She was, however, subsequently made a life member for her services. In 2006 she was awarded an OAM for that work and her contribution to Australian poetry. She published three collections of verse and a novel, as well as editing a biography and compiling a collection of satirical epitaphs.

Hellyer raised three children, two of whom had significant disabilities. She had six grandchildren, and three great-grandchildren. She died in Goulburn on 27 December 2012.

== Themes ==
Hellyer's work was highly influenced by her upbringing and adult life in Australia. Many of her poems centred around Australian history (The Last Song of Edward Kelly, The Ballad of Elinor Magee) or native landscape and wildlife (Song of the Humpback Whales, Dingo, Manly Pines). Others offered poignant portraits of Australian life (O'Regan's Bride, Miss Petty's Sunlight). However, Hellyer's most enduring and engaging work related to her subjective experiences of love, loss, and intensely felt details of everyday life (Alone, Living with Aunts, Young Girl Awakening, The Exile). Poems including To My Deaf Son, Facing Blindness, and Schizophrenia depicted Hellyer's struggles in raising two disabled sons.

== Selected works ==
=== Poetry ===
==== Collections ====
- The Exile – Selected Verse, 1969, Alpha Books.
- Song of the Humpback Whales – Selected Verse, 1981, Sisters Publishing Ltd.
- The Listening Place, 2007, Ginninderra Press.

==== List of poems ====
- Hellyer, Jill (March 1965). "Moment past". Meanjin Quarterly. 24 (1): 115.

=== Novels ===
- Not Enough Savages, 1975 Alpha Books

=== Non-fiction ===
- Tomb It May Concern Ed.
- The Luxury of Dreaming – Angry Women, 1989, Hale & Iremonger
- Letters to Huldah, 2013, Puncher & Wattmann

== Awards ==
- "Poetry Magazine Award".

== Sources ==
- The Puncher and Wattman anthology of Australian Poetry, Living with Aunts, page 223
- "MS 6814 Papers of Jill Hellyer (1925- )" – via National Library of Australia.
