= Ken Clift =

Australian Army officer

Kenneth (Ken) Rochester Clift
- Born: 9 January 1916; Sydney, New South Wales
- Died: 22 July 2009 (aged 93); Bondi, New South Wales
- Military career
- Allegiance: Australian Army
- Service years: 1939–45
- Rank: Lieutenant
- Service number: NX3698
- Units: 6th Division Signals; 1st Parachute Battalion
- Conflicts: World War II
- Awards: Distinguished Conduct Medal
- Other work: Author

Kenneth Rochester Clift DCM (9 January 1916 – 22 July 2009) was an Australian soldier and author. During World War II, he served with the 6th Division Signals and the 1st Parachute Battalion, and for his actions around Tobruk in 1941 he received the Distinguished Conduct Medal. After the war, he published several books including The Saga of a Sig. In 2007, when Clift was 91, the Defence Force School of Signals (DFSS) Holding Troop was renamed the "Ken Clift Troop" in his honour.

== War service ==
The day after war was declared, Clift enlisted with the Second AIF and sailed in the first convoy to Palestine. He saw service in Libya, Egypt, Bardia, Tobruk, Greece and Crete then, while returning to Australia, stopped in Ceylon (now Sri Lanka), where he completed a commando selection course. He later fought in the Kokoda Track campaign.

He entered the war as a signaller in the 2/1st Battalion (part of the 16th Brigade, 6th Division) and was discharged as a lieutenant in the 1st Australian Parachute Battalion in October 1945. He was in hospital when the war ended, after fracturing his back in a parachute jump. He always said that being a corporal was the easiest rank to get, noting that he was promoted to it four times in one year – and was busted back down again the same number of times.

Clift was regarded as a near miss for the Victoria Cross for his actions around Tobruk in 1941. He and two other linesmen, working ahead of the advancing troops, took on a battery of Italian field guns protected by machine-guns. With a cry of "At them, boys", Clift led the charge – between them they had only two pistols, a rifle and a few grenades with which to capture the guns and about sixty enemy soldiers.

== Clift Troop ==
"The Clift Troop" was another tribute to Clift in 2007. Clift attended the service as did some of his family. The troop formally known as "DFSS Holding Troop" put work in researching Clift's life and some of the soldiers put on a presentation and a speech on their research. Clift also spoke at the service, complimenting and thanking the troop for their work.

== Death ==
On 22 July 2009, Clift died at the age of 93 at a Sydney Hospital in Bondi at roughly 1:15 am, surrounded by family. Ken was survived by his wife Valerie and their children Patricia, Denise, kenneth and Ian, sixteen grandchildren, and six great grandchildren as well as his sisters Laurel O'Neill and Patricia Young and younger brother Don.

Clift's funeral was held at a Sydney crematorium. Many of Clift's friends and family attended as well as a number of soldiers from the "Clift Troop" who formed a guard of honour for his coffin. There were so many people at the crematorium for the service that they completely filled the building, which meant a number of people had to stand outside looking in through the door to see the service.

== Written works ==
- Clift, Kenneth Rochester. (1972). The Saga of A Sig. K.C.D. Publications.
- Clift, Kenneth Rochester. (1976). The Soldier Who Never Grew Up. Haldane Publishing Co.
- Clift, Ken and G. H. Fearnside. (1979). Dougherty, a great man among men: a biography of Major General Sir Ivan Dougherty. Alpha Books.
- Clift, Kenneth Rochester. (1980). War Dance: The Story of the 2/3rd Australian Infantry Battalion, 16 Brigade, 6 Division. Steamlined Press.

He also wrote a play, Sister Street, based on his war experiences, which was performed for Anzac Day in 2003.
