= Matt Bishop (journalist) =

English writer and public relations executive (born 1962)

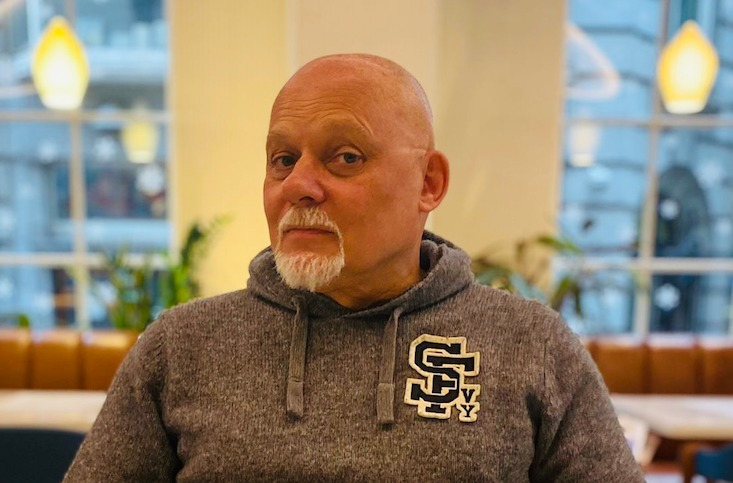
- Born: 25 December 1962 (age 63)

Matt Bishop (born 25 December 1962) is an English journalist, author, novelist and public relations executive.

== Background ==
Bishop was born in London to novelist Bernardine Bishop and pianist Stephen Kovacevich. His grandmother, Barbara Wall, and ancestors Viola Meynell and Alice Meynell, were also writers.

A longtime fundraiser for CLIC Sargent, Bishop donates proceeds from his novel The Boy Made the Difference to the charity.

As editor of F1 Racing, Bishop played a role in exposing McLaren's 'brake-steer' system, which was later banned. He also wrote columns for Autosport.

The Boy Made the Difference is based on Bishop’s experience as a volunteer during the HIV/AIDS crisis.

== Career ==
After leaving the Cardinal Vaughan Memorial School, Holland Park, in 1981, he failed to qualify as a London bus driver and then worked as a bookmaker, a betting-shop manager, and a minicab driver until the 1990s, when he began to freelance as a writer for Sporting Life and applied to university to study psychology. Dropping out after a year, he began his full-time writing career at Car magazine in 1993, becoming features editor, then in September 1995 moved to Focus magazine as deputy editor then acting editor, before joining F1 Racing (now renamed GP Racing) magazine as editor in December 1996, remaining until September 2007. F1 Racing sold 1.25 million copies a month worldwide during Bishop's tenure.

In the wake of the 2007 Formula 1 espionage controversy, which resulted in the McLaren Formula 1 team being fined an unprecedented $100 million, Bishop was recruited by McLaren chairman Ron Dennis to become the company's communications director, starting work at McLaren in January 2008. He left McLaren in July 2017. He wrote his first novel, The Boy Made the Difference (published in 2020), before returning to motorsport public relations work in 2018 as a member of the senior leadership team of W Series, the world’s first single-seater motor racing championship for female drivers only.

On 10 December 2020 it was announced that Bishop had been recruited by the Aston Martin Formula 1 team to be its chief communications officer, starting in 2021.

Bishop now runs his own boutique comms, PR, social media, content creation, and digital marketing agency, Diagonal Communications, writes a weekly online column for Motor Sport and co-hosts the And Colossally That's History podcast.

== Works ==
=== Non-fiction ===
- Emmo: a Racer’s Soul (co-written with Emerson Fittipaldi, 2014)

=== Novels ===
- The Boy Made the Difference (2020)
