= Lady Chatterley's Lover =

1928 novel by D. H. Lawrence

- 1932 UK authorised edition
- Author: D. H. Lawrence
- Language: English
- Genre: Erotic romance
- Publisher: Tipografia Giuntina, Florence, Italy
- Publication date: 1928 (private); 1932 (authorised); "Complete and unexpurgated" edition: 1959 (US); 1960 (UK)
- Publication place: Italy (1st publication)
- Preceded by: John Thomas and Lady Jane (1927)
- Text: Lady Chatterley's Lover at Wikisource

Lady Chatterley's Lover is the final novel by the English author D. H. Lawrence, first published privately in 1928, in Florence, Italy, and in 1929, in Paris, France. An unexpurgated edition was not published openly in the United Kingdom until 1960, when it was the subject of a watershed obscenity trial against the publisher Penguin Books, which won the case and quickly sold three million copies. The book was also banned for obscenity in the United States, Canada, Australia, India and Japan. The book soon became notorious for its story of the physical (and emotional) relationship between a working-class man and an upper-class woman, its explicit descriptions of sex and its use of then-unprintable profane words.

== Background ==
Lawrence's life, including his own relationship with his upper-class wife, Frieda, and his childhood in Nottinghamshire, influenced the novel. According to some critics, the fling of Lady Ottoline Morrell with "Tiger", a young stonemason who came to carve plinths for her garden statues, also influenced the story. Lawrence, who had once considered calling the novel John Thomas and Lady Jane in reference to the male and the female sex organs, made significant alterations to the text and story in the process of its composition.

Lawrence allegedly read the manuscript of Maurice by E. M. Forster, which was written in 1914 but published posthumously in 1971. That novel, although it is about a homosexual couple, also involves a gamekeeper becoming the lover of a member of the upper classes.

== Synopsis ==
The story concerns a young married woman, the former Constance Reid (Lady Chatterley), whose upper-class baronet husband, Sir Clifford Chatterley is paralysed from the waist down because of a Great War injury. Constance has an affair with the gamekeeper, Oliver Mellors, which develops into a serious relationship. The class difference between the couple highlights a major motif of the novel. The central theme is Constance's realisation that she cannot love with the mind alone. That realisation stems from a heightened sexual experience that Constance has felt only with Mellors, suggesting that love requires the elements of both body and mind. The novel has a somewhat open ending with Constance and Mellors facing an uncertain future, she pregnant by him, and Sir Clifford unwilling to divorce his wife.

== Characters ==
Constance, Lady Chatterley (Connie): The main character of the novel. Connie, who is an intellectual and socially progressive, is married to the cold and passionless Sir Clifford Chatterley. She falls in love with the gamekeeper Oliver Mellors and establishes a sexual bond with him. Having lived until then with a disappointing experience of her own sexuality, she matures as a sensual being and eventually leaves her husband.

Sir Clifford Chatterley, Bt: Connie's wealthy, handsome and well-built but paralyzed and impotent husband. Clifford, who is a successful writer and businessman, is emotionally cold and focused on material success. He looks down on the lower classes and feels they should remain in their place. Conscious of his inability to father an heir, Clifford is prepared to tolerate his wife seeking sexual satisfaction elsewhere and could even accept a child by another man, as long as appearances are kept up. Over the course of the story, Clifford becomes increasingly dependent on his nurse, Mrs. Bolton.

Oliver Mellors: The gamekeeper at Clifford Chatterley's estate, formerly an officer in the colonial army. Cold, intelligent, and noble in spirit, Mellors has endured a miserable marriage and now lives a quiet life alone, estranged from his wife and child. Mellors detests industrial modernity and nurses a dread of the future which makes him withdrawn. His relationship with Connie rekindles his passion for life. At the end of the novel, he plans to marry Connie.

Mrs. Ivy Bolton: Clifford's nurse. She is a middle-aged, complex, and intelligent woman. Her husband died in an accident in the mines owned by Clifford's family. Mrs. Bolton both admires and despises Clifford, and their relationship is intricate.

Michaelis: A successful Irish playwright. He has a brief relationship with Connie and proposes to her, but Connie sees him as a slave to success and devoid of passion.

Hilda Reid: Connie's older sister by two years. Hilda shares the same intellectual upbringing as Connie, but she looks down on Connie's relationship with Mellors due to his lower-class status. However, she eventually supports Connie.

Sir Malcolm Reid: The father of Connie and Hilda. He is a renowned painter and a sensual aesthete. He finds Clifford weak and immediately warms to Mellors.

Tommy Dukes: Clifford's friend and a brigadier general in the British army. He talks about the importance of sensuality but is personally detached from sexuality, only engaging in intellectual discussions.

Charles May, Hammond, Berry: Clifford's young intellectual friends. They visit Wragby and participate in meaningless discussions about love and sex.

Duncan Forbes: Connie and Hilda's artist friend. He paints abstract art, and at one point was in love with Connie. Connie initially claims she is pregnant with his child.

Bertha Coutts: Mellors' wife. Although she doesn't appear in the novel, her presence is felt. Separated from Mellors due to sexual incompatibility, she spreads rumors about Mellors, leading to his dismissal from his job.

Squire Winter: A relative of Clifford. He strongly believes in the old privileges of the aristocracy.

Daniele and Giovanni: Venetian gondoliers who serve Hilda and Connie. Giovanni hopes the women will pay him to have sex with them, but he is disappointed. Daniele reminds Connie of Mellors, as he is seen as a "real man."

== Themes ==
=== Mind and body ===
Richard Hoggart argues that the main subject of Lady Chatterley's Lover is not the explicit sexuality, which was the subject of much debate, but the search for integrity and wholeness. Key to this integrity is cohesion between the mind and the body, for "body without mind is brutish; mind without body... is a running away from our double being". Lady Chatterley's Lover focuses on the incoherence of living a life that is "all mind", which Lawrence found to be particularly true among the young members of the aristocratic classes, as in his description of Constance's and her sister Hilda's "tentative love-affairs" in their youth:

So they had given the gift of themselves, each to the youth with whom she had the most subtle and intimate arguments. The arguments, the discussions were the great thing: the love-making and connection were only sort of primitive reversion and a bit of an anti-climax.

The contrast between mind and body can be seen in the dissatisfaction each character experiences in their previous relationships, such as Constance's lack of intimacy with her husband, who is "all mind", and Mellors's choice to live apart from his wife because of her "brutish" sexual nature. The dissatisfactions lead them into a relationship that develops very slowly and is based upon tenderness, physical passion, and mutual respect. As the relationship between Lady Chatterley and Mellors builds, they learn more about the interrelation of the mind and the body. She learns that sex is more than a shameful and disappointing act, and he learns about the spiritual challenges that come from physical love.

Jenny Turner maintained in The Sexual Imagination from Acker to Zola: A Feminist Companion (1993) that the publication of Lady Chatterley's Lover broke "the taboo on explicit representations of sexual acts in British and North American literature". She described the novel as "a book of great libertarian energy and heteroerotic beauty".

=== Class ===
Lady Chatterley's Lover also presents some views on the early-20th-century British social context. That is most evidently seen in the plot on the affair of an aristocratic woman (Connie) with a working-class man (Mellors). That is heightened when Mellors adopts the local broad Derbyshire dialect, something he can slip into and out of. The critic and writer Mark Schorer writes of the forbidden love of a woman of relatively superior social situation who is drawn to an "outsider", a man of a lower social rank or a foreigner. He considers that to be a familiar construction in Lawrence's works in which the woman either resists her impulse or yields to it. Schorer believes that the two possibilities were embodied, respectively, in the situation into which Lawrence was born and that into which Lawrence married, which becomes a favourite topic in his work.

There is a clear class divide between the inhabitants of Wragby and Tevershall that is bridged by the nurse Mrs Bolton. Clifford is more self assured in his position, but Connie is often thrown when the villagers treat her as a Lady like when she has tea in the village. This is often made explicit in the narration such as here:

Clifford Chatterley was more upper class than Connie. Connie was well-to-do intelligentsia, but he was aristocracy. Not the big sort, but still it. His father was a baronet, and his mother had been a viscount's daughter.

There are also signs of dissatisfaction and resentment from the Tevershall coal pit colliers, whose fortunes are in decline, against Clifford, who owns the mines. Involved with hard, dangerous and health-threatening employment, the unionised and self-supporting pit-village communities in Britain have been home to more pervasive class barriers than has been the case in other industries (for an example, see chapter 2 of The Road to Wigan Pier by George Orwell.) They were also centres of widespread Nonconformism (Non-Anglican Protestantism), which hold proscriptive views on sexual sins such as adultery. References to the concepts of anarchism, socialism, communism and capitalism permeate the book. Union strikes were also a constant preoccupation in Wragby Hall.

Coal mining is a recurrent and familiar theme in Lawrence's life and writing because of his background, and it is prominent also in Sons and Lovers and Women in Love and short stories such as Odour of Chrysanthemums.

=== Industrialisation and nature ===
As in much of the rest of Lawrence's fiction, a key theme is the contrast between the vitality of nature and the mechanised monotony of mining and industrialism. Clifford wants to reinvigorate the mines with new technology and is out of touch with the living natural world, even though he identifies romantically with his status as aristocratic custodian of his country estate. In contrast, Connie often appreciates the beauty of nature and sees the ugliness of the mines in Uthwaite. Her heightened sensual appreciation applies to both nature and her sexual relationship with Mellors. Mellors for his part expresses disgust for the "mechanized greed" of modernity, for money and the ruling classes, and is on the other hand disappointed in the workers who seem to have lost their "pagan" vital spark and degenerated into consumerism.

== Censorship ==
A publisher's note in the 2001 Random House Inc. edition of the novel states that Lawrence "was unable to secure a commercial publication [of] the novel in its unexpurgated form". The author privately published the novel in 2000 copies to his subscribers in England, the United States and France in 1928. Later that same year, the second edition was privately published in 200 copies. Then, pirated copies of the novel were made.

An edition of the novel was published in Britain in 1932 by Martin Secker, two years after Lawrence's death. Reviewing it in The Observer, the journalist Gerald Gould noted that "passages are necessarily omitted to which the author undoubtedly attached supreme psychological importance—importance so great, that he was willing to face obloquy and misunderstanding and censorship because of them". An authorised and heavily censored abridgment was published in the United States by Alfred A. Knopf, Inc. also in 1932. That edition was subsequently reissued in paperback in the United States by Signet Books in 1946.

=== British obscenity trial ===
On 10 November 1960, the full unexpurgated edition, the last of three versions written by Lawrence, was published by Penguin Books in Britain, selling its first print run of 200,000 copies on the first day of publication.

The trial of Penguin under the Obscene Publications Act 1959 was a major public event and a test of the new obscenity law. The 1959 Act, introduced by Roy Jenkins, had made it possible for publishers to escape conviction if they could show that a work was of literary merit. One of the objections was to the frequent use of the word "fuck" and its derivatives. Another objection related to the use of the word "cunt".

Various academic critics and experts of diverse kinds, including E. M. Forster, Helen Gardner, Richard Hoggart, Raymond Williams and Norman St John-Stevas, were called as witnesses. The verdict, delivered on 2 November 1960, was "not guilty" and resulted in a far greater degree of freedom for publishing explicit material in the United Kingdom. The prosecution was ridiculed for being out of touch with changing social norms when the chief prosecutor, Mervyn Griffith-Jones, asked, "Is it a book you would even wish your wife or your servants to read?"

The Penguin second edition, published in 1961, contains a publisher's dedication, which reads: "For having published this book, Penguin Books was prosecuted under the Obscene Publications Act, 1959 at the Old Bailey in London from 20 October to 2 November 1960. This edition is therefore dedicated to the twelve jurors, three women and nine men, who returned a verdict of 'not guilty' and thus made D. H. Lawrence's last novel available for the first time to the public in the United Kingdom".

=== Australia ===
The book was banned in Australia, and a book describing the British trial, The Trial of Lady Chatterley, was also banned. In 1965 a copy of the British edition was smuggled into the country by Alexander William Sheppard, Leon Fink, and Ken Buckley, and then a run of 10,000 copies was printed and sold nationwide. The fallout from that event eventually led to the easing of censorship of books in the country. The ban by the Department of Customs and Excise on Lady Chatterley's Lover, along with three other books—Borstal Boy, Confessions of a Spent Youth, and Lolita—was lifted in July 1965. The Australian Classification Board, established in 1970, remains.

=== Canada ===
In 1962, McGill University Professor of Law and Canadian modernist poet F. R. Scott appeared before the Supreme Court of Canada to defend Lady Chatterley's Lover from censorship. Scott represented the appellants, who were booksellers who had been offering the book for sale.

The case arose when the police had seized their copies of the book and deposited them with a judge of the Court of Sessions of the Peace, who issued a notice to the booksellers to show cause why the books should not be confiscated as obscene, contrary to s 150A of the Criminal Code. The trial judge eventually ruled that the book was obscene and ordered that the copies be confiscated. That decision was upheld by the Quebec Court of Queen's Bench, Appeal Side (now the Quebec Court of Appeal).

Scott then appealed the case to the Supreme Court of Canada, which allowed the appeal on a 5–4 split and held that the book was not an obscene publication.

On 15 November 1960, an Ontario panel of experts, appointed by Attorney General Kelso Roberts, found that novel was not obscene according to the Canadian Criminal Code.

=== United States ===
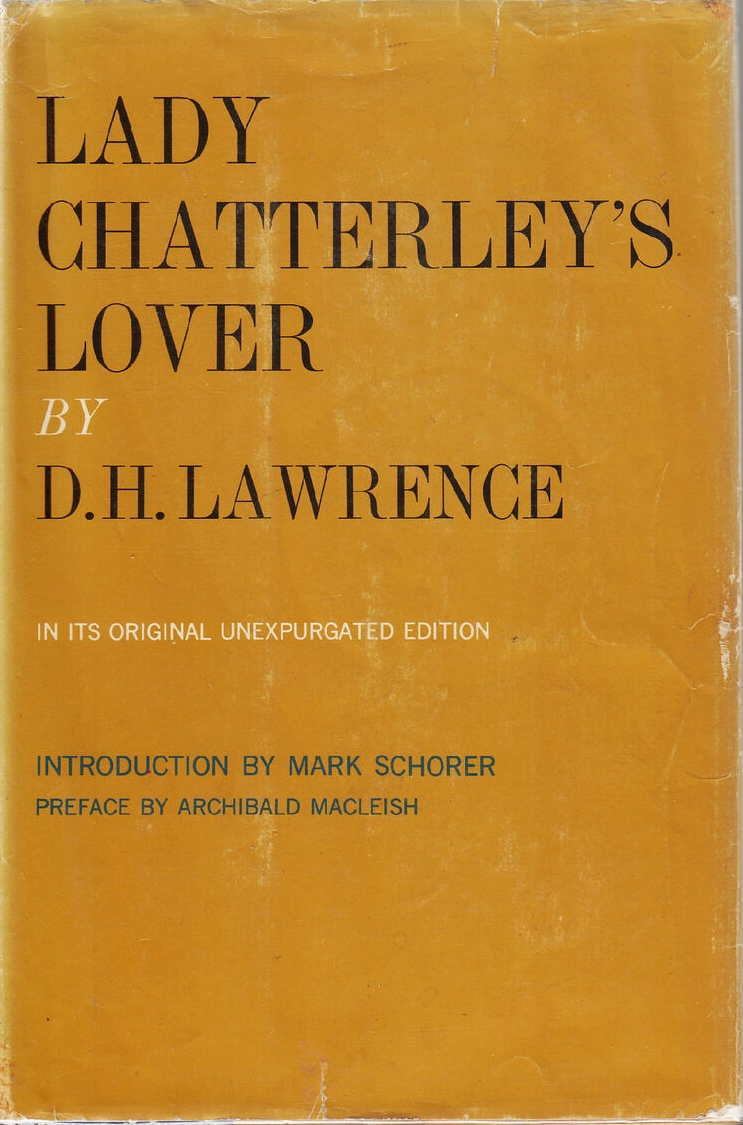
One of the US "unexpurgated" editions (1959)

Lady Chatterley's Lover was banned for obscenity in the United States in 1929. In 1930, Senator Bronson Cutting proposed an amendment to the Smoot–Hawley Tariff Act, which was being debated, to end the practice of having U.S. Customs censor allegedly obscene imported books. Senator Reed Smoot vigorously opposed such an amendment and threatened to read indecent passages of imported books publicly in front of the Senate. Although he never followed through, he included Lady Chatterley's Lover as an example of an obscene book that must not reach domestic audiences and declared, "I've not taken ten minutes on Lady Chatterley's Lover, outside of looking at its opening pages. It is most damnable! It is written by a man with a diseased mind and a soul so black that he would obscure even the darkness of hell!"

A 1955 French film version, based on the novel and released by Kingsley Pictures, was the subject of attempted censorship in New York in 1959 on the grounds that it promoted adultery. The US Supreme Court held on 29 June 1959 that the law prohibiting its showing was a violation of the First Amendment's protection of free speech.

The ban on Lady Chatterley's Lover, Tropic of Cancer and Fanny Hill was fought and overturned in court with assistance by publisher Barney Rosset and lawyer Charles Rembar in 1959. It was then published by Rosset's Grove Press, with the complete opinion by United States Court of Appeals Judge Frederick van Pelt Bryan, which first established the standard of "redeeming social or literary value" as a defence against obscenity charges. Fred Kaplan of The New York Times stated the overturning of the obscenity laws "set off an explosion of free speech".

Susan Sontag, in a 1961 essay in The Supplement to the Columbia Spectator that was republished in Against Interpretation (1966), dismissed Lady Chatterley's Lover as a "sexually reactionary" book and suggested that the importance given to vindicating it showed that the US was "plainly at a very elementary stage of sexual maturity".

=== Japan ===
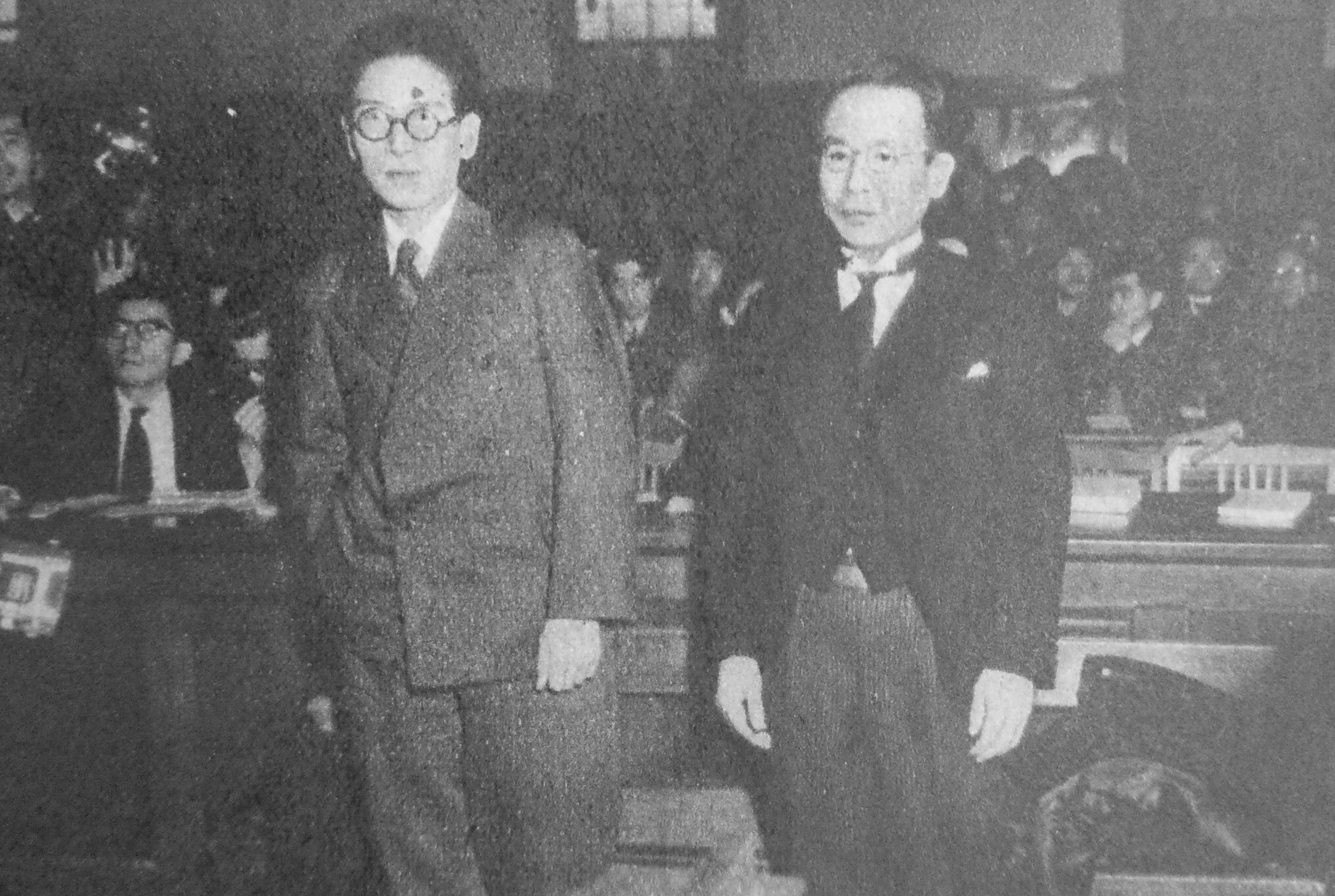
Translator Sei Itō (left) and his publisher Hisajirō Oyama (right) at the first Chatterley trial in Japan.

The publication of a full translation of Lady Chatterley's Lover by Sei Itō in 1950 led to a famous obscenity trial in Japan that extended from 8 May 1951 to 18 January 1952, with appeals lasting to 13 March 1957. Several notable literary figures testified for the defence. The trial ultimately ended in a guilty verdict with a ¥100,000 fine for Ito and a ¥250,000 fine for his publisher.

=== India ===
In 1964, the bookseller Ranjit Udeshi in Bombay was prosecuted under Section 292 of the Indian Penal Code (sale of obscene books) for selling an unexpurgated copy of Lady Chatterley's Lover.

Ranjit D. Udeshi v. State of Maharashtra (AIR 1965 SC 881) was eventually laid before a three-judge bench of the Supreme Court of India. Chief Justice Hidayatullah declared the law on the subject of when a book can be regarded as obscene and established important tests of obscenity such as the Hicklin test.

The court upheld the conviction:

When everything said in its favour we find that in treating with sex the impugned portions viewed separately and also in the setting of the whole book pass the permissible limits judged of from our community standards and as there is no social gain to us which can be said to preponderate, we must hold the book to satisfy the test we have indicated above.

== Cultural influence ==
In the United States, the full publication of Lady Chatterley's Lover was a significant event in the "sexual revolution". The book was then a topic of widespread discussion and a byword of sorts. In 1965, Tom Lehrer recorded a satirical song, "Smut", in which the speaker in the song lyrics cheerfully acknowledges his enjoyment of such material; "Who needs a hobby like tennis or philately?/I've got a hobby: rereading Lady Chatterley".

In Lady C: The Long, Sensational Life of Lady Chatterley's Lover, Guy Cuthbertson wrote that Lady Chatterley's Lover "is a book that has crept into so many walks of life that so many people have heard of, and that has been so frequently adapted, copied, illustrated, and referenced". In "What Did 'Lady Chatterley' Liberate?", Louis Menand notes numerous things to which Lady Chatterley's Lover gave rise, including the name of Lady Chatterley pub in Eastwood, Nottinghamshire; the song "Das War die Lady Chatterley", recorded by the German group Die Schock-Kings; as well as "the sequels, the spinoffs, and the rewrites", including "more than two dozen published just in this [the 21st] century".

The British poet Philip Larkin's poem "Annus Mirabilis" begins with a reference to the trial:

Sexual intercourse began
In nineteen sixty-three
(Which was rather late for me) –
Between the end of the Chatterley ban
And the Beatles' first LP.

In 1976, the story was parodied by Morecambe and Wise on their BBC sketch show. A "play what Ernie wrote", The Handyman and M'Lady, was obviously based on it, with Michele Dotrice as the Lady Chatterley figure. Introducing it, Ernie explained that his play "concerns a rich, titled young lady who is deprived of love, caused by her husband falling into a combine harvester, which unfortunately makes him impudent".

In the 1998 film Pleasantville, a film that narrativizes conservative cultural nostalgia for the 1950s as a response to the sexual revolution of the 1960s, Jennifer (played by Reese Witherspoon) reads Lady Chatterley's Lover as a principal part of her character development, causing her to become "colored", the film's metaphor for personal growth and transformation.

A 2007 episode of Mad Men saw Joan, Peggy, and other women in the office discuss Lady Chatterley's Lover. It is spoken of in scandalous tones and Joan remarks that the pages 'just fall open' to presumably the most salacious portions of the book.

A 2020 episode of Ghosts had Fanny (a ghost and the former lady of the manor from the Edwardian era) reading the book, and then developing feelings for Mike (the alive husband of her descendant, whom she otherwise thinks of as uncouth and uncultured) while he does garden work. Any pretenses of a full relationship are dashed, however, when she sees him slovenly eating a plate of nachos.

Lady Chatterley's Lover is also mentioned by characters in Meyer Levin's novel Compulsion.

== Bibliography ==
=== Editions ===
- First published privately in 1928 in Florence, with assistance from Pino Orioli, and in France in 1929. A private edition was issued in Australia by Inky Stephensen's Mandrake Press in 1929.
- Soon after the 1928 publication and suppression, an unexpurgated Tauchnitz edition appeared in Europe. Jock Colville, then 18, purchased a copy in Germany in 1933 and lent it to his mother Lady Cynthia, who passed it on to Queen Mary, only for it to be confiscated by King George V.
- In 1946, Victor Pettersons Bokindustriaktiebolag Stockholm, Sweden published an English hardcover edition, copyright Jan Förlag. It is marked "Unexpurgated authorized edition". A paperback edition followed in 1950.
- Lawrence, D. H. (1959) [1928], Lady Chatterley's Lover (1st ed.), Grove.
- Lawrence, D. H. (1959) [1928], Lady Chatterley's Lover (1st ed.), Signet.
- Lawrence, D. H. (1961) [1928], Lady Chatterley's Lover (2nd ed.)
- The Second Lady Chatterly's Lover was first issued in English in 1972, although Lawrence's version dates to 1927.
- Hoggart, R. (1973). "Introduction". Lady Chatterley's Lover (2nd ed.). Harmondsworth: Penguin. ISBN 0-14-001484-5..
  - ——— (1961), "Introduction", Lady Chatterley's Lover (2nd ed.).
- Michael Squires, ed. (1993) [1st Pub. 1928]. Lady Chatterley's Lover. Cambridge University Press. ISBN 0-521-22266-4. LCCN 91008194. OCLC 23220488. OL 1530768M.
- Dieter Mehl & Christa Jansohn, ed. (1999). The First and Second Lady Chatterley Novels. Cambridge University Press. ISBN 0-521-47116-8. These two books, The First Lady Chatterley and John Thomas and Lady Jane, were earlier drafts of Lawrence's last novel.
- Lawrence, D. H. (2002). Squires, Michael (ed.). Lady Chatterley's Lover and A Propos of 'Lady Chatterley's Lover'. The Cambridge Edition of the Works of D. H. Lawrence. Cambridge: University of Cambridge Press. ISBN 0-521-00717-8. "Edited with an introduction, explanatory notes, glossary, textual apparatus and various appendices by Michael Squire. The standard and definitive text."
- ——— (2003) [1928], Lady Chatterley's Lover, New York: Signet.
- The Second Lady Chatterley's Lover. Oneworld Classics. 2007. ISBN 978-1-84749-019-3.

=== Further reading ===
- Cuthbertson, Guy (May 2026), Lady C: The Long, Sensational Life of Lady Chatterley's Lover. London and New Haven: Yale University Press, ISBN 978-0-300-26637-5
- Rolph, C. H. (5 March 1991) [1st Pub. 1961]. The Trial of Lady Chatterley: Regina V. Penguin Books Limited. London: Penguin. ISBN 0-14-013381-X. OL 7348331M.
- Sybille Bedford (2016), The Trial of Lady Chatterley's Lover, with an introduction by Thomas Grant, London: Daunt Books, ISBN 978-1-907970-97-9
- Augustine, Ivyanne Marie (Winter 2018). Regeneration and Social Spaces in "Lady Chatterley's Lover" (PDF) (Thesis). University of Michigan. "A thesis presented for the B. A. degree with Honors in The Department of English"

== Adaptations ==
=== Books ===
Lady Chatterley's Lover was re-imagined as a love triangle set in contemporary Silicon Valley, California in the novel Miss Chatterley by Logan Belle (the pseudonym for American author Jamie Brenner) published by Pocket Star/Simon & Schuster, May 2013.

=== Film and television ===
Lady Chatterley's Lover has been adapted for film and television several times:

- L'Amant de lady Chatterley (1955), French drama film starring Danielle Darrieux, was banned in the United States because it "promoted adultery", but was released in 1959 after the Supreme Court reversed that decision.
- Edakallu Guddada Mele (On top of Edakallu Hill) (1973), an Indian Kannada language film starring Jayanthi and directed by Puttanna Kanagal, was loosely based on the Kannada novel of the same name which was inspired by Lady Chatterley's Lover.
- Sharapancharam (Bed of Arrows) (1979), an Indian Malayalam language film starring Jayan and Sheela and directed by Hariharan, was loosely based on Lady Chatterley's Lover.
- Lady Chatterley's Lover (1981), a British/French film directed by French director Just Jaeckin in the English language and produced by Menahem Golan and Yoram Globus, starred Sylvia Kristel and Nicholas Clay. (Jaeckin had previously directed Kristel in Emmanuelle, which was released in 1974.)
- Lady Chatterley (1993), is a BBC Television serial which was directed by Ken Russell for BBC Television; it starred Joely Richardson and Sean Bean and incorporated some material from the longer second version John Thomas and Lady Jane.
- Milenec lady Chatterleyové (1998) is a Czech television version directed by Viktor Polesný and starring Zdena Studenková (Constance), Marek Vašut (Clifford), and Boris Rösner (Mellors).
- Ang Kabit ni Mrs Montero (Mrs. Montero's Paramour, 1998) is a Filipino soft-core film adapted by director Peque Gallaga.
- The French director Pascale Ferran filmed a French-Language version (2006) with Marina Hands as Constance and Jean-Louis Coulloc'h as the gamekeeper, which won the Cesar Award for Best Film in 2007. Marina Hands was awarded best actress at the 2007 Tribeca Film Festival. The film was based on John Thomas and Lady Jane, Lawrence's second version of the story. It was broadcast on the French television channel Arte on 22 June 2007 as Lady Chatterley et l'homme des bois (Lady Chatterley and the Man of the Woods).
- Lady Chatterley's Daughter (Lady Chatterley's Ghost) (2011) an American film. Director/Fred Olen Ray. Actress/Cassandra Cruz.
- Lady Chatterley's Lover (2015) is a BBC television film starring Holliday Grainger, Richard Madden and James Norton. Produced by Hartswood Films and Serena Cullen Productions, it was first broadcast on BBC One on 6 September 2015. It was released by Netflix as a drama series and stars Madden as Mellors; Grainger as Lady Chatterley; and Norton as Sir Clifford.
- Lady Chatterley's Lover (2022) is an American film directed by French director Laure de Clermont-Tonnerre and starring Emma Corrin and Jack O’Connell as Constance Reid and Mellors, respectively. It also featured Matthew Duckett as Sir Clifford Chatterley. It was released on 25 November 2022 in UK cinemas and on 2 December 2022 on Netflix.

Use of character

The character of Lady Chatterley appears in Fanny Hill Meets Lady Chatterly (1967), Lady Chatterly [sic] Versus Fanny Hill (1974) and Young Lady Chatterley (1977). Bartholomew Bandy meets her shortly after her 1917 marriage in the novel Three Cheers for Me (1962, revised 1973) by Donald Jack.

=== Radio ===
Lady Chatterley's Lover was adapted for BBC Radio 4 by Michelene Wandor and broadcast in two parts in September 2006. Constance, Mellors and Sir Clifford were played respectively by Lia Williams, Robert Glenister and Roger Allam.

=== Theatre ===
Lawrence's novel was dramatised as a three-act play by the British playwright John Harte. It was produced at the Arts Theatre in London in 1961. The Arts was a theatre club: members of the audience had to be members. The theatre was therefore not subject to the authority of the official theatre censor, the Lord Chamberlain. The critic Felix Barker wrote, "Episodic, boring, full of trite dialogue and with some very stilted performances, this unimaginative exercise in bringing Lawrence to the stage must be accounted a failure". Clive Barnes commented that the play did not tackle Lawrence's themes of "sex. nature, industrialisation, and the animal humanity of man" and consisted of "stilted dialogue and the consequently unrealistic situation". A proposed transfer to a larger West End theatre had to be abandoned because the producer considered that changes demanded by the Lord Chamberlain's Office would render the play "phoney" and "mean the death of the play".

A new stage version, adapted and directed by Philip Breen and produced by the English Touring Theatre and Sheffield Theatres, opened at the Crucible Theatre in Sheffield, between 21 September and 15 October 2016, before touring the UK until November 2016. When the production played at the Festival Theatre, Malvern a reviewer wrote, "Full marks to Philip Breen for arguably being the first director to present this literary classic as the writer probably intended". The reviewer in The Times found the play and production "clinical ... lacking in energy ... stilted".

== Parody ==
MAD Magazine published in 1963 a spoof called Lady Chatterley's Chopped Liver And Other Recipes.

== See also ==
- Le Monde's 100 Books of the Century
