= Parliamentary constituencies in Northamptonshire =

The location of Northamptonshire relative to England.

The county of Northamptonshire is divided into 7 parliamentary constituencies: 2 borough constituencies and 5 county constituencies.

== Constituencies ==
Conservative † Labour ‡

Constituency (Note: BC denotes borough constituency, CC denotes county constituency.)	Electorate	Majority (Note: The majority is the number of votes the winning candidate receives more than their nearest rival.)	Member of Parliament	Nearest opposition	Map
Corby and East Northamptonshire CC	78,770	6,331	Lee Barron ‡	Tom Pursglove †	
Daventry CC	76,539	3,012	Stuart Andrew †	Marianne Kimani ‡	
Kettering CC	79,360	3,820	Rosie Wrighting ‡	Philip Hollobone †	
Northampton North BC	75,713	9,014	Lucy Rigby ‡	Dan Bennett †	
Northampton South BC	71,512	4,071	Mike Reader‡	Andrew Lewer †	
South Northamptonshire CC	76,555	3,687	Sarah Bool †	Rufia Ashraf ‡	
Wellingborough and Rushden CC	77,542	5,486	Gen Kitchen ‡	David Goss †	

== 2024 boundary changes ==
See 2023 review of Westminster constituencies for further details.

Former name
1. Corby CC
2. Daventry CC
3. Kettering CC
4. Northampton North BC
5. Northampton South BC
6. South Northamptonshire CC
7. Wellingborough CC
Boundaries 2010–2024

2010–2024 constituencies in Northamptonshire

Current name
1. Corby and East Northamptonshire CC
2. Daventry CC
3. Kettering CC
4. Northampton North BC
5. Northampton South BC
6. South Northamptonshire CC
7. Wellingborough and Rushden CC
Boundaries 2024–present

Current constituencies in Northamptonshire

For the 2023 review of Westminster constituencies, which redrew the constituency map ahead of the 2024 United Kingdom general election, the Boundary Commission for England maintained seven constituencies in Northamptonshire, as detailed below, with boundary changes to reflect changes to ward boundaries following the reorganisation of local government authorities within the county and to bring the electorates within the statutory range. Corby was renamed Corby and East Northamptonshire, and Wellingborough renamed Wellingborough and Rushden. These changes came into effect from the 2024 general election.

Containing electoral wards from North Northamptonshire

- Corby and East Northamptonshire
- Daventry (part)
- Kettering
- South Northamptonshire (part)
- Wellingborough and Rushden

Containing electoral wards from West Northamptonshire

- Daventry (part)
- Northampton North
- Northampton South
- South Northamptonshire (part)

== Results history ==
Primary data source: House of Commons research briefing – General election results from 1918 to 2019

=== 2024 ===
The number of votes cast for each political party who fielded candidates in constituencies comprising Northamptonshire in the 2024 general election were as follows:

Party	Votes	%	Change from 2019	Seats	Change from 2019
Labour	122,226	36.3%	▲7.2%	5	▲5
Conservative	100,203	29.8%	▼29.2%	2	▼5
Reform	61,502	18.3%	New	0	Steady
Greens	23,170	6.9%	▲4.0%	0	Steady
Liberal Democrats	22,306	6.6%	▼1.8%	0	Steady
Others	6,894	2.0%	▲1.4	0	Steady
Total	336,331	100.0		7	

=== Percentage votes ===
Election year	1974 (Feb)	1974 (Oct)	1979	1983	1987	1992	1997	2001	2005	2010	2015	2017	2019	2024
Labour	38.6	41.3	36.3	25.5	27.1	33.5	45.0	43.8	37.5	25.7	25.7	35.9	29.1	36.3
Conservative	39.1	40.6	50.2	49.0	51.7	51.8	40.4	41.2	43.1	47.4	50.6	55.7	59.0	29.8
Reform	–	–	–	–	–	–	–	–	–	–	–	–	–	18.3
Green Party	–	–	–	–	*	*	*	*	*	0.8	3.5	1.7	2.9	6.9
Liberal Democrat^{1}	22.0	18.1	12.8	25.2	20.8	14.3	11.1	12.6	15.2	19.1	4.1	4.1	8.4	6.6
UKIP	–	–	–	–	–	–	*	*	*	2.8	16.0	2.5	*	–
Other	0.3	–	0.7	0.2	0.4	0.4	3.4	2.5	4.2	4.3	0.1	0.1	0.6	2.0

^{1}1974 & 1979 – Liberal Party; 1983 & 1987 – SDP–Liberal Alliance

* Included in Other

=== Seats ===
Election year	1974 (Feb)	1974 (Oct)	1979	1983	1987	1992	1997	2001	2005	2010	2015	2017	2019	2024
Labour	2	2	1	0	0	0	5	5	2	0	0	0	0	5
Conservative	3	3	4	6	6	6	1	1	4	7	7	7	7	2
Total	5	5	5	6	6	6	6	6	6	7	7	7	7	7

=== Maps ===
==== 1885–1910 ====
1885

1886

1892

1895

1900

1906

Jan 1910

Dec 1910

==== 1918–1945 ====
1918

1922

1923

1924

1929

1931

1935

1945

==== 1950–1979 ====
1950

1951

1955

1959

1964

1966

1970

==== 1974–present ====
The borders of Northamptonshire changed from 1974, with the Soke of Peterborough area becoming part of neighbouring Cambridgeshire.

Feb 1974

Oct 1974

1979

1983

1987

1992

1997

2001

2005

2010

2015

2017

2019

2024

== Historical representation by party ==
A cell marked → (with a different colour background to the preceding cell) indicates that the previous MP continued to sit under a new party name.

=== 1885 to 1918 ===
Conservative Independent Liberal Labour Liberal Liberal-Labour Liberal Unionist National Party

Constituency	1885	1886	89	91	1892	1895	1900	1906	Jan 1910	Dec 1910	17	18
Northampton	Labouchère							Paul	Lees-Smith			
Northampton	Bradlaugh			Manfield		Drucker	Shipman		McCurdy			
Northamptonshire East	Channing									Money		→
Northamptonshire Mid	Spencer					Pender	Spencer	Manfield				
Northamptonshire North	Cecil					Monckton	Stopford-Sackville	Nicholls	Brassey			
Northamptonshire South	Knightley				Guthrie	Douglas-Pennant	FitzRoy	Grove	FitzRoy		→	→
Peterborough	Wentworth-FitzWilliam	→	Morton			Purvis		Greenwood				

=== 1918 to 1950 ===
Coalition Liberal (1918–22) / National Liberal (1922–23) Conservative Co-operative Labour Speaker

Constituency	1918	1922	1923	1924	28	1929	1931	1935	40	43	1945
Daventry	FitzRoy				→					R, Manningham-Buller	
Kettering	Waterson	Parker	Perry	M. Manningham-Buller		Perry	Eastwood		Profumo		Mitchison
Northampton	McCurdy		Bondfield	Holland	Malone		M. Manningham-Buller		Summers		Paget
Peterborough	Brassey					Horrabin	Cecil			Hely-Hutchinson	Tiffany
Wellingborough	Smith	Shakespeare	Cove			Dallas	James				Lindgren

=== 1950–1983 ===
Conservative Labour

Constituency	1950	1951	1955	1959	62	1964	1966	69	1970	Feb 1974	Oct 1974	1979
Kettering	Mitchison					de Freitas						Homewood
Northampton / Northampton North (1974)	Paget									Colquhoun		Marlow
Wellingborough	Lindgren			Hamilton		Howarth		Fry				
Peterborough	Nicholls									Transferred to Huntingdon and Peterborough		
Northamptonshire South / Daventry (1974)	Manningham-Buller				Jones							Prentice
Northampton South										Morris		

=== 1983–present ===
Conservative Labour

Constituency	1983	1987	1992	1997	2001	2005	2010	12	2015	2017	2019	24	2024
Corby / Corby & East Northants (2024)	Powell			Hope			Mensch	Sawford	Pursglove				Barron
Daventry	Prentice	Boswell					Heaton-Harris						Andrew
Kettering	Freeman			Sawford		Hollobone							Wrighting
Northampton North	Marlow			Keeble			Ellis						Rigby
Northampton South	Morris			Clarke		Binley			Mackintosh	Lewer			Reader
Wellingborough / W & Rushden (2024)	Fry			Stinchcombe		Bone						Kitchen	
South Northamptonshire							Leadsom						Bool

== See also ==
- List of electoral wards in Northamptonshire
- Northamptonshire in the European Parliament (disambiguation)
- Parliamentary constituencies in the East Midlands
