= List of Communist Party MPs (UK) =

This is a list of Communist Party MPs. It includes all members of Parliament elected to the British House of Commons representing the Communist Party of Great Britain from 1834 onwards.

Member	Image	Constituency	Years served	Notes	Ref
Cecil Malone		Leyton East	1920–1922	Elected as Coalition Liberal 1918; defected to British Socialist Party 1919, which formed main constituent of Communist Party of Great Britain 1920. Did not seek re-election 1922, having joined the Independent Labour Party. Labour MP for Northampton 1928 – 1931	
Walton Newbold		Motherwell	1922–1923	Elected without Labour opposition. Application to take the Labour whip and sit with the Labour group rejected; did not seek re-election 1923.	
Shapurji Saklatvala		Battersea North	1924–1929	Labour MP 1922–1923; re-elected as Communist 1924 without Labour opposition; defeated 1929 against Labour opposition.	
Willie Gallacher		West Fife	1935–1950	Elected against Labour opposition; defeated 1950 against Labour opposition.	
Phil Piratin		Mile End	1945–1950	Elected against Labour opposition; seat abolished 1950, defeated at Stepney against Labour opposition.	
