= Sydney Morgan =

Sydney Morgan may refer to:

- Syd Morgan, Plaid Cymru politician
- Sydney, Lady Morgan (1781?–1859), Irish novelist
- Sydney Cope Morgan (1887–1967), British barrister and politician
