= 1940 Northampton by-election =

UK Parliamentary by-election

The 1940 Northampton by-election was held on 6 December 1940. The by-election was held due to the resignation of the incumbent Conservative MP, Mervyn Manningham-Buller. It was won by the Conservative candidate Spencer Summers.

Northampton by-election, 1940
Party	Candidate	Votes	%	±%
Conservative	Spencer Summers	16,587	93.4	+41.9
Christian Pacifist	William Stanley Seamark	1,167	6.6	New
Majority		15,420	86.8	+83.8
Turnout		17,754	30.0	−49.6
Conservative hold		Swing		
