= Sydney Cope Morgan =

British barrister and Liberal Party politician

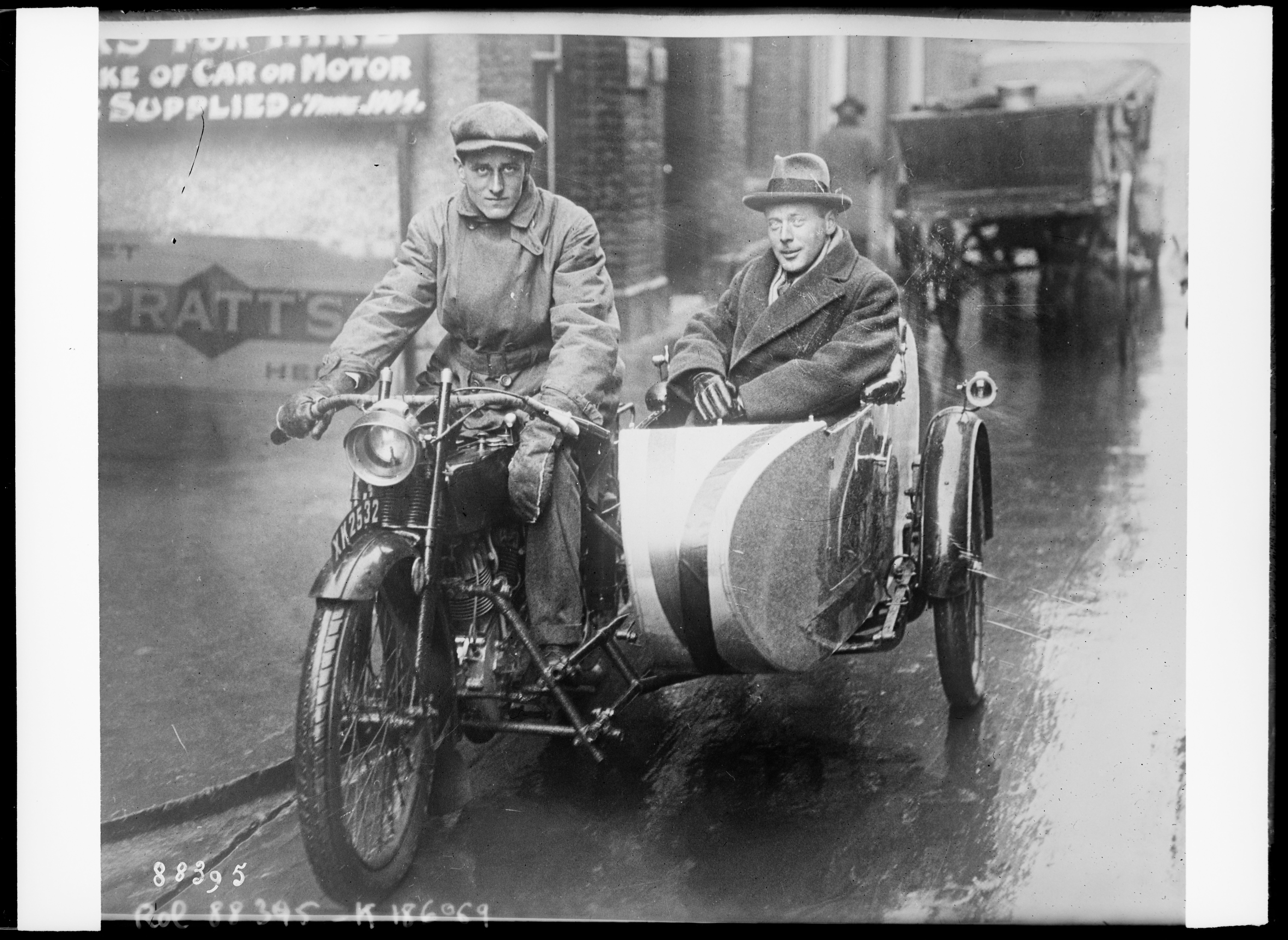

Sydney Cope Morgan MBE QC (25 October 1887 – 14 October 1967), was a British barrister and Liberal Party politician.

== Background ==
Morgan was the eldest son of George Ernest Morgan, of Cookham Dean, Berkshire. He was educated at Taunton School and Trinity College, Cambridge. In 1918 he was made a Member of the Order of the British Empire.

== Professional career ==
Morgan served in the European War, 1914–18 as a Major in the South Wales Borderers. He received the Call to Bar in 1921. He was a Captain on the General List from 1940–44. In 1946 he was appointed a Queen's Counsel. He was Leader of the Parliamentary Bar from 1952–62. He became a Bencher, Middle Temple in 1954.

== Political career ==
Morgan was Liberal candidate for the Cambridge division at the 1922 Cambridge by-election. The Liberal party had not contested the previous election when Labour came second. However, Morgan's campaign helped to re-establish the party as a political force in the borough;

1922 Cambridge by-election Electorate 28,402
Party	Candidate	Votes	%	±%
Unionist	George Newton	10,897	48.7	−26.6
Labour	Hugh Dalton	6,954	31.1	+6.4
Liberal	Sydney Morgan	4,529	20.2	N/A
Majority		3,943	17.6	−33.0
Turnout			80.4	+19.6
Unionist hold		Swing	-16.5	

He was again Liberal candidate for Cambridge at the 1922 General Election which took place shortly after. At this election he was able to improve the Liberal vote and take second place from the Labour party;

1922 General Election: Cambridge Electorate 28,402
Party	Candidate	Votes	%	±%
Unionist	George Newton	11,238	48.7	+0.0
Liberal	Sydney Morgan	7,005	30.4	+10.2
Labour	Alec Sandy Firth	4,810	20.9	−11.2
Majority		4,233	18.3	
Turnout			81.2	+0.8
Unionist hold		Swing	-5.1	

He was again Liberal candidate for Cambridge at the 1923 General Election. He achieved a 5% swing but this was not enough to unseat the sitting Unionist;

1923 General Election: Cambridge Electorate 28,920
Party	Candidate	Votes	%	±%
Unionist	George Newton	9,814	42.0	−6.7
Liberal	Sydney Morgan	7,852	33.5	+3.1
Labour	Alec Sandy Firth	5,741	24.5	+3.6
Majority		1,962	8.5	−9.8
Turnout			80.9	−0.3
Unionist hold		Swing	-5.1	

He did not contest the 1924 General Election. He was Liberal candidate for the Northampton division at the 1928 Northampton by-election. The seat was a Unionist/Labour marginal which made it tough for a Liberal candidate. However, he managed to retain the level of support the party had won at the previous general election;

1928 Northampton by-election Electorate: 48,048
Party	Candidate	Votes	%	±%
Labour	Cecil Malone	15.173	37.5	+0.3
Unionist	Alexander Frederick Gordon Renton	14,616	36.1	−3.4
Liberal	Sydney Morgan	9,584	23.7	+0.4
Ind. Conservative	Augustine Hailwood	1,093	2.7	+2.7
Majority		557	1.4	3.8
Turnout			84.2	−2.8
Labour gain from Unionist		Swing	+1.9	

He did not stand for parliament again.
