= 1920 Northampton by-election =

UK parliamentary by-election

← 1918	1 April 1920	1922 →
- Turnout: 67.1% (29,929)

	First party	Second party
Candidate	Charles McCurdy	Margaret Bondfield
Party	National Liberal	Labour
Popular vote	16,650	13,279
Percentage	55.6%	44.4%
Swing	▼7.1	▲7.1
MP before election
McCurdy
Liberal
Subsequent MP
McCurdy
National Liberal

The 1920 Northampton by-election was a parliamentary by-election held for the British House of Commons constituency of Northampton on 1 April 1920.

== Vacancy ==
The by-election was caused by the appointment of the sitting Coalition Liberal MP, Charles McCurdy as Minister of Food Control. Under the Parliamentary rules of the day, McCurdy was required to resign his seat and fight a by-election.

== Candidates ==
=== Liberals ===
The Northampton Liberals agreed to support McCurdy, although the mood in the association was reported as being strongly in favour of the maintenance of the Liberal Party as an independent political force and wary of any moves which might involve fusion with the Coalition Conservatives or the creation of a Centre Party.

=== Conservatives ===
The Unionists agreed not to run a candidate against McCurdy in view of their party’s role in the Coalition government of David Lloyd George and the need to support Lloyd George “as the man who had guided the ship of state through the years of war into the calmer waters of peace”.

=== Labour ===
The Labour Party chose as their candidate Mrs Margaret Bondfield. Mrs Bondfield was originally a textiles worker who became a trade union official for the Shop Assistants' Union. She was also a founder-member and an officer of the Women's Labour League. She went on to become one of the first women elected to Parliament for Labour and the Britain’s first female Cabinet Minister.

== Issues ==
Given Mc Curdy’s appointment the price of food was an early campaign issue with Labour attacking the government for high prices and McCurdy defending the actions of the Coalition in setting up a committee to investigate the price of food and the level of profits in the industry. However McCurdy was able to counter Labour criticism by reminding voters that this was not an issue which the Parliamentary Labour Party had raised at all during 1919 and the policy of the government to use regulation to maintain and check prices was essentially the same approach that Labour had adopted.

In her election address, Mrs Bondfield declared her support of a Capital levy on accumulated wealth, as opposed to indirect taxation, and the appointment of an International Economic Council to apportion supplies and credits according to need. She blamed British support for the White movement in the Russian Civil War for the high price of bread. She also supported the right of the Irish people to self-determination and independence from Britain.

In his election address, issued on 27 March 1920, McCurdy dealt exclusively with questions of food control and profiteering. He linked his appointment as Food Minister and the measures the government were taking with the issue of high prices. If he were re-elected, he argued, it would be a blow against the exploitation of the consumer and against the profiteer. In view of his personal commitment to the job, Labour was finding it hard to paint McCurdy as a friend of the profit-mongers.

== The result ==
McCurdy held his seat with a reduced majority (down to 3,371 from 7,275 at the 1918 general election and a reduced percentage of the poll (down to 55.6% from 62.7%). Labour had campaigned strongly. They had anticipated the appointment of McCurdy as a Minister and had adopted Mrs Bondfield in good time to begin nursing the constituency. They were well organised if some commentators felt their candidate’s sex was a disadvantage to their electoral prospects. The by-election at Camberwell North West held on the previous day had also resulted in a Coalition Liberal hold by a newly appointed minister, Thomas James Macnamara against the challenge of a female Labour candidate, Miss Susan Lawrence. Although Lawrence was to go on to gain election to Parliament later and Mrs Bondfield's persistence in Northampton paid off at the 1923 election, the failure of two women candidates in by-elections at the same time was a setback to the adoption of female candidates.

The result was also good news for Lloyd George who was pleased to see his newly appointed ministers being returned successfully to Parliament. By-election results early in the life of the government had not gone so well and Northampton and other results were regarded as something of a revival in government fortunes. The results also encouraged the Coalition Liberals to believe that any revival of Asquithian Liberalism was a mirage. However, as we have seen the failure of the Independent Liberals to contest Northampton was not solely a question of weakness of organisation or spirit. There was genuine confusion and soul-searching in the party over the Asquith-Lloyd George split and McCurdy was to face an Independent Liberal opponent at the 1922 as well as Labour.

== The votes ==
Northampton by-election, 1920:
Party		Candidate	Votes	%	±%
C	Liberal	Charles McCurdy	16,650	55.6	−7.1
	Labour	Margaret Bondfield	13,279	44.4	+7.1
Majority			3,371	11.2	−14.2
Turnout			29,929	67.1	+4.6
	Liberal hold		Swing	-7.1	
C indicates candidate endorsed by the coalition government.

== See also ==
- List of United Kingdom by-elections
- United Kingdom by-election records
