= Anthony Thomas Smith =

British politician (1935–2017)

Anthony Thomas Smith QC (21 June 1935 – 15 September 2017) was a British lawyer and Liberal Party politician.

== Background ==
Smith was born the son of Sydney Ernest Smith and Winston Victoria Smith. He was educated at Northampton, Stafford, and Hinckley Grammar Schools, and at King's College, Cambridge (Exhibitioner; MA). In 1959 he married Letitia Ann Wheldon Griffith. They had one son and two daughters.

== Professional career ==
Smith was Called to the Bar by the Inner Temple in 1958. He served as a Flying Officer in the RAF from 1958 to 1960, then returned to his legal career. He was founder and Chairman of the Birmingham Free Representation Scheme. He was made a QC in 1977 and appointed as a Recorder. He was made a Bencher in 1985.

== Political career ==
Smith was Liberal candidate for the Northampton division at the 1959 General Election. The constituency was a Labour/Conservative marginal and the Liberals had not run a candidate since coming a poor third in 1950. His prospects were not good and the party did not improve on its position.

=== Electoral record ===
General Election 1959: Northampton
Party	Candidate	Votes	%	±%
Labour	Reginald Thomas Guy Des Voeux Paget	27,823	46.30	−6.45
Conservative	Joan Christabel Jill Knight	25,106	41.77	−5.48
Liberal	Anthony Thomas Smith	7,170	11.93	N/A
Majority		2,717	4.52	−0.98
Turnout		60,099	82.87	+0.27
Registered electors		72,521		
Labour hold		Swing	-0.49	
