= Francis Beale =

Francis Beale may refer to:

- Francis Beale (writer) (fl. 1656), English author
- Francis Beale (MP) (born 1577), MP for Northampton

== See also ==
- Frank Beal (1862–1934), American actor and director
- Frances M. Beal (born 1940), American feminist
