= William Lane (fl. 1571) =

English politician

William Lane (fl. 1571) was an English politician.

He was a member (MP) of the Parliament of England for Northampton in 1571. He was a son of Ralph and Maud Lane.
