= 1928 Northampton by-election =

UK parliamentary by-election

The 1928 parliamentary by-election for the British House of Commons constituency of Northampton.

== Previous MP ==
The sitting Conservative MP, Sir Arthur Holland died on 7 December 1927, causing a by-election. He had been the MP here since 1924, when he gained the seat from Labour.

== Electoral history ==
The Liberal party lost the seat in 1923 and at the 1924 election, the seat became a Labour/Conservative marginal.

General election, 29 October 1924
Party	Candidate	Votes	%	±%
Conservative	Arthur Holland	16,017	39.5	+9.5
Labour	Margaret Bondfield	15,046	37.2	−3.3
Liberal	James Manfield	9,536	23.3	−6.2
Majority		971	2.3	N/A
Turnout		40,599	87.0	+2.7
Conservative gain from Labour		Swing	+6.4	

== Candidates ==
The Conservative candidate selected to defend the seat was A.F.G. Renton, who had come second at Leeds West in the 1924 general election. The defeated Labour MP from 1924, Margaret Bondfield was elected MP for Wallsend in the 1926 by-election, so Labour had to find a new candidate. They selected Cecil L'Estrange Malone. In the 1918 general election, Malone was elected as the Coalition Liberal MP for Leyton East. Around 1919-20 he became a Communist and stood down from parliament prior to the 1922 general election. He unsuccessfully stood as the Labour candidate for Ashton-under-Lyne at the 1924 general election. The Liberal candidate, Sydney Cope Morgan had not contested the last election. A fourth candidate entered the contest in the figure of a 53-year-old Manchester baker, E.A. Hailwood. He had also stood as an Independent Conservative candidate at the 1927 Southend by-election, coming fourth. He put himself forward as a candidate protesting against Baldwin's lack of leadership as Prime Minister.

== Campaign ==
The appeal of Augustine Hailwood was made principally on the issue of trade. He called for the introduction of protective tariffs which he argued would benefit the local shoe and boot industry.

== Result ==
Northampton by-election, 1928
Party	Candidate	Votes	%	±%
Labour	Cecil L'Estrange Malone	15,173	37.5	+0.3
Unionist	Alexander Frederick Gordon Renton	14,616	36.1	−3.4
Liberal	Sydney Cope Morgan	9,584	23.7	+0.4
Ind. Unionist	E.A. Hailwood	1,093	2.7	New
Majority		557	1.4	N/A
Turnout		40,466	84.2	−2.8
Labour gain from Unionist		Swing	+1.9	

Hailwood had taken just enough votes off the official Conservative candidate to enable Labour to win.

== Aftermath ==
Neither Morgan nor Hailwood contested the 1929 general election. However, L'Estrange and Renton faced each other again.

General election 1929
Party	Candidate	Votes	%	±%
Labour	Cecil L'Estrange Malone	22,356	41.7	+2.2
Conservative	Alexander Frederick Gordon Renton	20,177	37.7	+1.6
Liberal	Helen Schilizzi	11,054	20.6	−3.1
Majority		2,179	4.0	+2.6
Turnout		53,587	87.5	+3.3
Labour hold		Swing	+3.2	
