= Geoffrey Balde =

English politician

Geoffrey Balde (fl. 1414–1428) was an English politician. He sat as MP for Northampton in November 1414.
