= William Begworth =

English politician

William Begworth (fl. 1391–1406) was an English politician. He sat as MP for Northampton in 1391.

He also served as bailiff of Northampton from Michaelmas 1397 till 1398 and collector of a tax in Northampton in March 1401.
