= Helen Argenti =

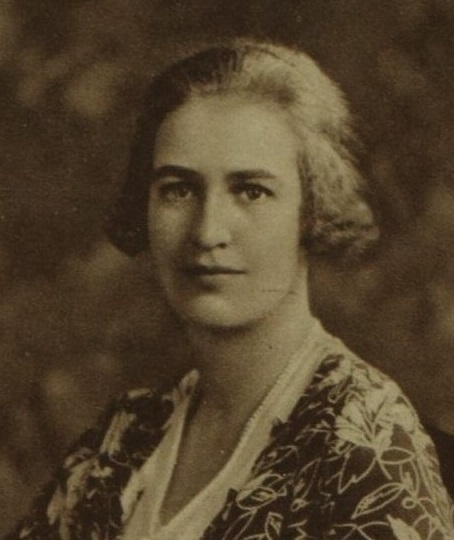
Helen Argenti

Helen Argenti (née Alexandra Helen Schilizzi; 28 April 1904 – 23 March 1988) was a British lecturer and Liberal Party politician. She was made a Grand Officer of the Holy Sepulchre, an Officer Order of Evpomas, and awarded the Greek Commemorative Naval Medal.

== Background ==
Argenti was born the third daughter of Stephen John Schilizzi and Julia Lucas Schilizzi (née Ralli) of Loddington Hall, Kettering. She was a niece of the Greek Prime Minister, Eleftherios Venizelos, who married her aunt, philanthropist Helena Schilizzi. She had a Greek Orthodox upbringing. The family moved to Guilsborough Court, Northampton. Her father was High Sheriff of Northamptonshire in 1915. In 1930 she married Philip Pandely Argenti. They had a son, Pandely Paul Laurence Stephen Argenti and two daughters.

== Career ==
Argenti played a role in support of the Allies in World War I. She organised help for the Venizelist troops, being responsible for a fund that supplied the troops with basic clothing.

After the war she became actively involved in the League of Nations Union that would see her traveling to various parts of the world. For three years she was a lecturer for the League of Nations Union. She traveled extensively in Bulgaria, Romania, Hungary and Austria. She also visited the United States and crossed Canada from coast to coast. She worked for the Belgian Section of the Federation of Associations of the League of Nations. She obtained the backing of the International Federation of University Women in organising meetings in Sofia, Bulgaria. In Sofia she delivered lectures and met with top officials and Ministers.

When not traveling she returned to the family home at Guilsborough Court, Northampton. She was also active in the local community, serving as Honorary Secretary of the Northamptonshire branch of the League of Nations Union. Through her support of the League of Nations she was drawn into the Liberal Party. At the age of just 24 she was adopted as prospective Liberal candidate for Northampton in September 1928. She attended the Annual Meeting of the National Liberal Federation in 1928 and spoke in the debate on armaments. She opposed a proposal for an "immediate and substantial reduction in armaments" arguing that this would have a drastic effect on employment. She preferred a gradual reduction in arms. Nine months after being chosen as Northampton's Liberal candidate, voters went to the polls in the 1929 General Election. Although Northampton had last returned a Liberal as recently as 1922, in a by-election early in 1928, the Liberal candidate had finished third in a contest closely fought between Unionist and Labour. That made Argenti's campaign a tough one, despite the fact that the vote was being given to women under 30 for the first time. She came third, polling just over a fifth of the vote.

General Election 1929: Northampton
Party	Candidate	Votes	%	±%
Labour	Cecil John L'Estrange Malone	22,356	41.7	+2.2
Unionist	Alexander Frederick Gordon Renton	20,177	37.7	+1.6
Liberal	Alexandra Helen Schilizzi	11,054	20.6	−3.1
Majority		2,179	4.0	+0.6
Turnout			87.5	+3.3
Labour hold		Swing	+0.3	

She did not stand for parliament again. However, now married, Helen Argenti remained active within the Liberal Party, most notably in the Women's Liberal Federation. In 1939 she supported the peace efforts of Prime Minister Neville Chamberlain out of a sense of national unity. This encouraged her to write to Liberal Party leader Sir Archibald Sinclair, whom she criticised for giving vocal support to Chamberlain's critic Sir Anthony Eden.

She was buried on 28 March 1988, at the Greek Orthodox Cemetery, in West Norwood.
