= 1922 Cambridge by-election =

UK parliamentary by-election

← 1918	16 March 1922	1922 (GE) →

Constituency of Cambridge
- Registered: 27,833
- Turnout: 80.4% (▲19.5%)
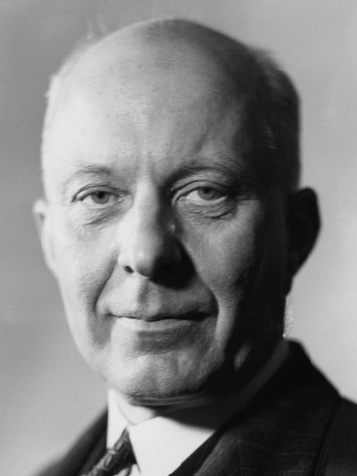
	First party	Second party	Third party
	Con		Lib
Candidate	George Newton	Hugh Dalton	Sydney Cope Morgan
Party	Conservative	Labour	Liberal
Popular vote	10,897	6,954	4,529
Percentage	48.69%	31.07%	20.24%
Swing	▼26.61%	▲6.37%	New
MP before election
Eric Geddes
Conservative
Subsequent MP
George Newton
Conservative

The 1922 Cambridge by-election was a by-election held on 16 March 1922 for the British House of Commons constituency of Cambridge.

The by-election was caused by the resignation on 7 November 1921 of the town's Conservative Party Member of Parliament (MP) Sir Eric Geddes, who had held the seat since 1917, and had come under criticism as Minister of Transport for the scale of nationalisation he had overseen, and over charges of departmental inefficiency. He chose to resign as both cabinet minister and MP.

The result was a comfortable victory for the new Conservative candidate Sir George Newton, who held the seat until his elevation to the peerage in 1934 as Baron Eltisley. The election nonetheless saw a sharp fall in the Conservative share of the vote (by over one third) since the 'khaki election' of 1918, although the Conservative vote only actually fell by 656, and Newton's fall in vote share is mainly attributable by a slight rise in the Labour vote, and the appearance of the first Liberal candidate to contest the seat since 1910.

Of the two unsuccessful candidates, Hugh Dalton was a Cambridge-educated LSE lecturer in economics who went on to be an MP from 1924, and became Labour's Chancellor under Clement Attlee; and Sydney Cope Morgan was a Cambridge-educated barrister who went on to contest the seat again for the Liberals with an increased vote at each of the next two general elections.

All three candidates were contesting the seat for the first time, and Dalton would not contest the seat again.

== Result of the previous general election in Cambridge ==
General election 1918: Cambridge
Party		Candidate	Votes	%	±%
C	Unionist	Eric Geddes	11,553	75.30	N/A
	Labour	Thomas Rhondda Williams	3,789	24.70	N/A
Majority			7,764	50.60	N/A
Turnout			15,342	60.95	N/A
	Unionist hold		Swing		
C indicates candidate endorsed by the coalition government.

== Result of 16 March 1922 by-election ==
By-election 1922: Cambridge
Party	Candidate	Votes	%	±%
Conservative	George Newton	10,897	48.69	−26.61
Labour	Hugh Dalton	6,954	31.07	+6.37
Liberal	Sydney Cope Morgan	4,529	20.24	N/A
Majority		3,943	17.62	−32.98
Turnout		22,380	80.41	+19.46
Unionist hold		Swing	-28.84	

== See also ==
- List of United Kingdom by-elections
- Cambridge constituency
- 1934 Cambridge by-election
- 1967 Cambridge by-election
- 1976 Cambridge by-election
