= John Bernhill =

English politician

John Bernhill (fl. 1410–1435) was an English politician. He sat as MP for Northampton in May 1421.

He also served as town clerk of Northampton from Michaelmas 1410 till 1411; bailiff from 1418 till 1419; and mayor from 1431 till 1432.
