= Charles Ross (politician, born 1799) =

British politician

Charles Ross (1799–1860), was a British politician, Member of Parliament for Orford (1822–1826), St Germans (1826–1832) and Northampton (1832–1837).

== Life ==
He was the son of Alexander Ross, Surveyor-General of the Ordnance and Isabella Barbara Evelyn Gunning, daughter of Sir Robert Gunning, 1st Baronet.

He was put forward as a candidate for St Albans by his father when he was just 21; he came second but had to step aside under threat of contest from John Easthope, despite the initial acquiescence of Lord Althorp, the local grandee. He was nominated at Orford by the 3rd Marquess of Hertford for the constituency of Orford, after Castlereagh's suicide, and became a solid Tory Member of Parliament, to 1837. He also served as a Civil Lord of the Admiralty from 1830 to 1832, as one of the Lords Commissioners of the Treasury 1834–1835 and as a Commissioner of Audit from 1849 until his death on 21 March 1860.

Ross is buried at Kensal Green Cemetery, London.
