= Hastings Lees-Smith =

British politician (1878–1941)

The Right Honourable Hastings Lees-Smith
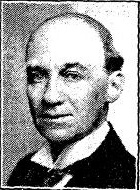
- Lees-Smith in 1929

Leader of the Opposition
- In office 22 May 1940 – 18 December 1941
- Monarch: George VI
- Preceded by: Clement Attlee
- Succeeded by: The Lord Pethick-Lawrence

President of the Board of Education
- In office 2 March 1931 – 24 August 1931
- Monarch: George V
- Prime Minister: Ramsay MacDonald
- Preceded by: Sir Charles Trevelyan, Bt
- Succeeded by: Sir Donald Maclean

Postmaster General
- In office 7 June 1929 – 2 March 1931
- Monarch: George V
- Prime Minister: Ramsay MacDonald
- Preceded by: The Lord Selsdon
- Succeeded by: Clement Attlee
Parliamentary offices
Member of Parliament for Keighley
In office 14 November 1935 – 18 December 1941
Preceded by	George Harvie-Watt
Succeeded by	Ivor Bulmer-Thomas
In office 29 October 1924 – 7 October 1931
Preceded by	Robert Pilkington
Succeeded by	George Harvie-Watt
In office 15 November 1922 – 16 November 1923
Preceded by	Robert Clough
Succeeded by	Robert Pilkington
Member of Parliament for Northampton
In office 1910 – 25 November 1918 Serving with Charles McCurdy
Preceded by	Herbert Paul; John Greenwood Shipman
Succeeded by	Charles McCurdy

Personal details
- Born: 26 January 1878 British India
- Died: 18 December 1941 (aged 63) London, England
- Party: Labour
- Spouse: Joyce Holman (m. 1915)
- Education: Queen's College, Oxford

Hastings Bertrand Lees-Smith (26 January 1878 – 18 December 1941) was a British Liberal turned Labour politician who was briefly in the cabinet as President of the Board of Education in 1931. He was the acting Leader of the Opposition and Leader of the Labour Party (as chairman of the Parliamentary Labour Party) from 1940 until his death, during the time Clement Attlee was in government.

== Family background ==
Lees-Smith was from an army family. His father was a major in the Royal Artillery and he was born in British India. He was educated at Aldenham School, as a cadet at the Royal Military Academy, Woolwich, and Queen's College, Oxford. Rejecting a military career, he chose academia and was appointed as a lecturer in Public Administration at the London School of Economics in 1906, where he remained throughout his political career. He was also Chairman of the Executive Committee of Ruskin College, Oxford, from 1907 to 1909. He resigned on appointment as Professor of Public Administration at the University of Bristol.

In 1909, he went on an extended tour of India to lecture at Bombay on economics and advise on economics teaching. As a result of his experiences he wrote Studies in Indian Economics. He joined a territorial regiment in 1915, and was wounded as a stretcher bearer on the Western Front and invalided out of the armed forces in 1917.

He married Joyce Holman in 1915, and they had two children.

In 1938, he distributed 40 British passports to German Jews in Frankfurt, thus aiding their escape. The Chest of Surprises describes the Lees-Smith family history.

== Liberal Party ==
At the January 1910 general election, Lees-Smith was elected as a Liberal for the two-member Northampton constituency. Unlike his fellow Northampton MP, Charles McCurdy, Lees-Smith allied with H. H. Asquith rather than David Lloyd George in the Liberal split during the First World War and, as a consequence, was not offered support by the Coalition in the 1918 general election. Rather than defend Northampton (which had been reduced to one member), he moved to the new Don Valley constituency but lost to a Coalition-supported National Democratic and Labour Party candidate. Indicating his estrangement from the Liberal Party, he fought as an "Independent Radical", even though he had been adopted by the local Liberal association. He was the member of Parliament who, in July 1917, read Siegfried Sassoon's declaration that the First World War had continued too long and should be ended.

== Labour Party ==
In 1919, Lees-Smith joined the Labour Party. He was picked as Labour candidate for Keighley and won the seat in the 1922 general election, profiting from a divided opposition. He was a noted speaker on banking and on reform of the House of Lords, about which he wrote several books including Second Chambers in Theory and Practice (1923). Unfortunately for Lees-Smith, the Conservatives did not stand a candidate in the 1923 general election and he was defeated by the Liberal candidate. That defeat prevented him from being appointed as a Minister in the first Labour government.

== Ministerial office ==
The collapse of the Liberal Party in the 1924 general election meant that Lees-Smith won his seat back, and he was swiftly appointed to a frontbench role. When Labour returned to office in 1929, he was made Postmaster-General. In that role, he defended the nationalised Post Office and tried to smarten up Post Office counters. In a reshuffle in March 1931, he was promoted to President of the Board of Education and sworn of the Privy Council. In that capacity, in June he gave the opening address at the Second International Congress of the History of Science. He had only a brief time in office before the government fell, and Lees-Smith refused to follow Ramsay MacDonald into the National Government.

Defeated again in 1931, Lees-Smith again won his seat back in 1935. He served on the front bench but was not invited by Winston Churchill to join the Coalition government in 1940. As one of the most senior Labour figures not in office, the responsibilities of running the party were given to him. In his partisan role he strongly supported Churchill's conduct as war leader even if the war was not always running in the Allies' favour.

He died at his home in London on 18 December 1941.

Parliament of the United Kingdom
Preceded by Herbert Paul; John Greenwood Shipman	Member of Parliament for Northampton; 1910–1918; With: Charles McCurdy	Succeeded by Charles McCurdy
Preceded by Sir Robert Clough	Member of Parliament for Keighley; 1922–1923	Succeeded by Robert Pilkington
Preceded by Robert Pilkington	Member of Parliament for Keighley; 1924–1931	Succeeded by George Harvie-Watt
Preceded by George Harvie-Watt	Member of Parliament for Keighley; 1935–1941	Succeeded by Ivor Thomas
Political offices
Preceded by Sir William Mitchell-Thomson, Bt	Postmaster-General; 1929–1931	Succeeded by Clement Attlee
Preceded by Sir Charles Trevelyan, Bt	President of the Board of Education; 1931	Succeeded by Sir Donald Maclean
Preceded by Clement Attlee	Leader of the Opposition; 1940–1941	Succeeded by Frederick Pethick-Lawrence
