= Arthur Holland (British Army officer) =

British Army general and politician (1862–1927)

Lieutenant-General Sir Arthur Holland KCB KCMG DSO MVO
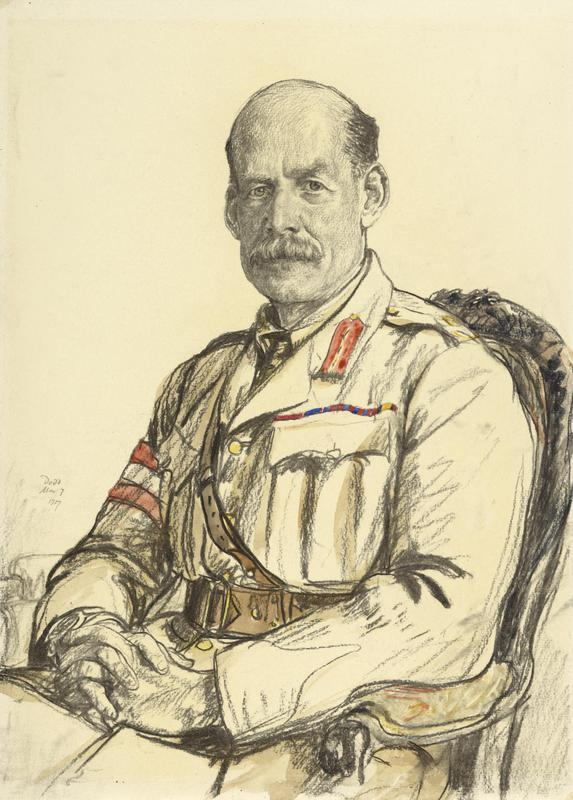
- 1917 portrait by Francis Dodd
- Born: Arthur Edward Aveling Butcher; 13 April 1862; Kent, England
- Died: 7 December 1927 (aged 65)
- Military career
- Allegiance: United Kingdom
- Branch: British Army
- Service years: 1880–1920
- Rank: Lieutenant-General
- Commands: I Corps; 1st Division; Royal Military Academy, Woolwich
- Conflicts: First World War
- Awards: Knight Commander of the Order of the Bath; Knight Commander of the Order of St Michael and St George; Distinguished Service Order; Member of the Royal Victorian Order; Mentioned in Despatches; Legion of Honour

Lieutenant-General Sir Arthur Edward Aveling Holland, KCB, KCMG, DSO, MVO (13 April 1862 – 7 December 1927) was a British Army officer and Conservative and Unionist politician.

== Early military career ==
Born the son of Major General Butcher, Butcher changed his surname to Holland in 1910. Holland was, after graduating from the Royal Military Academy at Woolwich, commissioned into the Royal Artillery in May 1880. He was promoted to captain in November 1888.

After being promoted to major on augmentation in July 1898, he served in the Second Boer War and then became assistant military secretary to the governor and commander-in-chief of Malta in 1903. He was promoted to lieutenant colonel in November 1905 and to brevet colonel in November 1908.

He later served at the War Office from January 1910 as an assistant military secretary, and was promoted to colonel on the same date. In September 1912 he was appointed commandant of the Royal Military Academy, Woolwich, for which he was later promoted to the temporary rank of brigadier general in January 1913.

== First World War ==
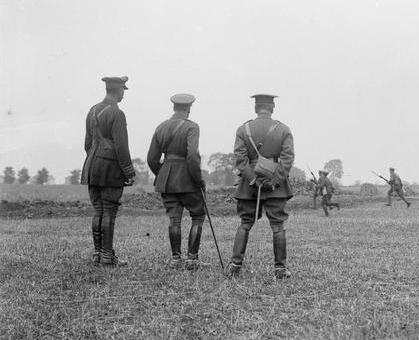
King George V (centre) watching a practice attack at the Third Army Trench Mortar School at Ligny-Saint-Flochel, where the King was received by Major General Arthur Holland, MGRA Third Army (right), and Major Hudson, who was in charge, 9 August 1916.

He also served in the First World War, which began in the summer of 1914, becoming brigadier general, Royal Artillery (BGRA) of the 8th Division in September, in which capacity he took part in the Battle of Neuve Chapelle in March 1915. In June he was made a CB "for services rendered in connection with Military Operations in the Field".

In July he became BGRA for VII Corps but was only there briefly as in September, after being promoted to the temporary rank of major general, he succeeded Major General Richard Haking as general officer commanding (GOC) of the 1st Division.

His major general's rank having been made substantive in January 1916, "for distinguished service in the Field", he led his division in the first few months of 1916, although not in any major actions.

He continued his war service as major general, Royal Artillery (MGRA) for General Sir Edmund Allenby's Third Army from June 1916.

He became GOC of I Corps from February 1917, upon being made a temporary lieutenant general, and which he commanded for the remainder of the war.

== Postwar and final years ==
He became colonel commandant of the Royal Artillery in October 1919. He retired from the army in March 1920, after his rank of lieutenant-general was made permanent.

== Member of Parliament ==
Holland was Member of Parliament for Northampton from 1924 until his death in 1927. The consequent by-election for his seat was won by the Labour candidate Cecil Malone.

== Family ==
Arthur Holland married Mary Kate Duval; they had one daughter. He died in 1927 and was interred in Greenwich Cemetery.

Military offices
| Preceded by Richard Henry Jelf | Commandant of the Royal Military Academy Woolwich; 1912–1914 | Succeeded by William Cleeve |
| Preceded by Richard Haking | General Officer Commanding 1st Division; 1915–1916 | Succeeded by Peter Strickland |
| Preceded by Hubert Gough | General Officer Commanding I Corps; 1917–1918 | Post disbanded |
Parliament of the United Kingdom
| Preceded by Margaret Bondfield | Member of Parliament for Northampton; 1924–1927 | Succeeded by Cecil Malone |
