= Northamptonshire in the European Parliament =

Northamptonshire in the European Parliament may refer to three European Parliament constituencies that represented the English county of Northamptonshire:

- Northamptonshire (European Parliament constituency) (1979–1994), a single-member constituency
- Northamptonshire and Blaby (European Parliament constituency) (1994–1999), a single-member constituency
- East Midlands (European Parliament constituency) (1999–2020), a much larger six-member constituency
