= Mervyn Manningham-Buller =

British Army officer and politician (1876–1956)

Sir Mervyn Edward Manningham-Buller, 3rd Baronet (16 January 1876 – 22 August 1956) was a British Conservative politician and Member of Parliament (MP).

== Family ==
His parents were Major-General Edmund Manningham-Buller and Lady Anne Coke. He married Lilah Constance Cavendish, daughter of Major-General Charles Cavendish, 3rd Baron Chesham and Lady Beatrice Constance Grosvenor, on 8 July 1903. Their children included Reginald Manningham-Buller, who served as Attorney-General.

== Military career ==
Manningham-Buller was commissioned as a second lieutenant in The Rifle Brigade on 9 October 1895, and was promoted to lieutenant on 25 May 1898, and to captain on 18 March 1901. He was seconded to the Imperial Yeomanry for service in the Second Boer War (1899–1901), and was 2nd in command of the 21st Battalion until he relinquished this appointment on 12 March 1902, when he returned to his regiment. Following the end of hostilities in South Africa, he returned to the United Kingdom in August 1902, and resigned from the army in January 1903. He later received the rank of lieutenant-colonel.

== Political career ==
Between 1924 and 1929 he was Conservative Member of Parliament for Kettering. In 1931 he was elected MP for Northampton; he resigned in 1940 upon becoming Steward of the Manor of Northstead.

=== Death ===
Mervyn Manningham-Buller died in Chelsea, London, aged 80.

Parliament of the United Kingdom
Preceded by Samuel Perry	Member of Parliament for Kettering; 1924–1929	Succeeded by Samuel Perry
Preceded by Cecil Malone	Member of Parliament for Northampton; 1931–1940	Succeeded by Spencer Summers
Baronetage of the United Kingdom
Preceded by Morton Edward Manningham-Buller	Baronet (of Dilhorne); 1910–1956	Succeeded by Reginald Manningham-Buller
