= Herbert Paul =

English writer and MP (1853–1935)

Herbert Paul

Herbert Woodfield Paul (1853–1935) was an English writer and Liberal MP.

== Life ==
He was the eldest son of George Woodfield Paul, Vicar of Finedon, and Jessie Philippa Mackworth. He was educated at Eton College and Corpus Christi College, Oxford, where he became President of the Oxford Union. He was called to the bar at Lincoln's Inn in 1878. He was a leader-writer on the Daily News. In 1883 he married Elinor Budworth, daughter of the Hon. William Ritchie, Legal member of the Viceregal Council at Calcutta.

In 1892 Paul became MP for Edinburgh South. He lost his seat in 1895, but remained politically active speaking out against the Boer War for instance at the Liberal conference of 1900. He returned to the House of Commons as MP for Northampton from 1906 to January 1910. From 1909 to 1918 he was the Second Civil Service Commissioner.

== Works ==
- Men and Letters, 1901
- Gladstone, 1901
- Matthew Arnold, 1902
- History of Modern England, 1904-6 (5 vols)
  - vol 1: Covers 1846 to 1855. Chapters include the last Whig Government, Palmerston's Foreign Policy, The Irish Famine, The Court and the People, Revolution and Reaction, English Chartists and Irish Rebels, The Era of Retrenchment, The Expansion of England, Theology and Literature, Lord Palmerston's Triumph, The Development of the Colonies, England and the Church of Rome, The Literature of the Mid-Century, Palmerston's Fall, The First Government of Lord Derby, The Coalition, The Eastern Question, The First Part of the Russian War, The Second Part of the Russian War. online
  - vol 2: Covers 1855–1865. online v 2
  - vol 3: Covers 1865 to 1875. Chapters include The Russell-Gladstone Ministry, The Education of the Conservative Party, The Irish Church, Parties in the Church of England, The Climax of Liberalism, England and the Continent, Army Reform, The Settlement with America, The Conservative Reaction, The Liberal Heritage, Theology and Literature, The Ministry of All the Opportunities, Intellectual and Social Progress. online
  - vol 4: Covers 1875 to 1885. Chapters include The Storm in the East, Lord Beaconsfield's Position, The Fruits of Imperialism, The Storm in the West, The Policy of Reversal, The Irish Revolution, Egypt, The Soudan, Lord Spencer's Task, The Franchise, The Fall, Church and State. online
  - vol 5: Covers 1885 to 1895. online
- Life of Froude, 1905 online

== Notes ==
Parliament of the United Kingdom
Preceded by Hugh Childers	Member of Parliament for Edinburgh South; 1892 – 1895	Succeeded by Robert Cox
Preceded by Henry Labouchère; John Greenwood Shipman	Member of Parliament for Northampton; 1906 – Jan. 1910; With: John Greenwood Shipman	Succeeded by Charles McCurdy; Hastings Lees-Smith
