= John Greenwood Shipman =

British politician

Shipman

Dr John Greenwood Shipman (13 February 1848 – 20 October 1918) was an English barrister and Liberal Party politician.

== Family and education ==
Shipman was born in Manchester the only son of John Shipman of Northampton and his wife Ruth (née Sheffield). Ruth Shipman was the aunt of George Sheffield (1839–1892), the Manchester artist. He went to school in Northampton and afterwards at Hurstpierpoint College. He undertook his further education first at London University where he passed the first LL.B examination with honours. He then went on to New College, Oxford and took a second class in the final year of jurisprudence in 1875, a first class in the Bachelor of Civil Law examination in 1878 and was Vinerian Law Scholar in 1878. In 1877 he had obtained an Inns of Court studentship in civil law and in 1878 gained a scholarship in common law given by the Inner Temple.

In 1885 he married Ann Elizabeth Hobbs, who died six weeks after the ceremony.

In 1906 he married Clara Alice Gent from Northampton.

== Career ==
On leaving school, Shipman was articled to a solicitor in London but when his articles expired he decided to read for the Bar. He was called to the bar at the Inner Temple in 1878 and joined the Midland Circuit. He took his LL.D in 1895.

== Politics ==
=== Gravesend ===
Shipman first contested a Parliamentary election for the Liberals at Gravesend in Kent at the 1892 general election. The final meeting of his campaign was the scene of considerable public disorder. He was prevented by the mob from speaking from the platform and after he had left a fight took place between his supporters and those of his Unionist opponent. Fireworks were thrown and a hosepipe was deployed from the stage. The riot left several people sustaining injuries.

=== Northampton ===
Shipman did not return to the political fray in 1895 but in May 1900 he was adopted by the Liberals to fight one of the seats at Northampton, a two-member constituency in the general election of 1900. Shipman proclaimed himself a pronounced Radical and a Home Ruler. He also announced he was in favour of continued British supremacy in South Africa and was a supporter of the Liberal Imperialists, a centrist faction within the Liberal Party in the late Victorian and Edwardian periods, favouring a more positive attitude towards the development of the British Empire and Imperialism.

In Northampton, Shipman should have been running in partnership with Henry Labouchère who had represented the borough for Liberalism since 1880. However Labouchère had fallen out with the Northampton Liberal and Radical Association and said he wished to fight the election as an Independent. Labouchère was out of the country at the start of the election so Shipman was obliged to issue his election address separately. In the end Labouchère did stand again as a Liberal and he and Shipman were elected, Shipman’s seat being a gain from the Unionists.

Shipman held his seat at the 1906 general election despite the intervention this time of Labour candidates, making it a three-cornered contest. However by 1909 Shipman decided he did not wish to fight any more elections citing reasons of health and he retired from Parliamentary politics at the January 1910 general election. Both Northampton seats were held for the Liberal Party by new candidates.

=== Women’s Suffrage interests ===
Shipman was a supporter of the Women’s Local Government Society and campaigned with them for improved rights for women taking part in local government elections and activities.

In 1905 Shipman sponsored a Bill in Parliament, the Local Authorities (Qualification of Women) Bill, to encourage the election of women to local government office and to place directly elected women on education authorities. The Bill got as far as passing its Second Reading by a majority of 150 votes but was taken no further. Its purpose was to involve women more greatly in many areas of local government activity such as housing the poor, running public lodging houses, managing the female side of "lunatic asylums" (sic), the prevention of cruelty to children, supervision of industrial schools, the supervision of midwives and baby farms, of homes for inebriate women, of Police Courts and court waiting rooms and other aspects of public health. To this end, he led a deputation to Prime Minister Henry Campbell-Bannerman in November 1906. The deputation did not get the Prime Minister’s assurance that the Bill would be supported by the government that Session but he did say the Cabinet were strongly in support and hoped the Bill could be passed in the next Session. He blamed the disruptive tactics of the Opposition for not bringing it forward at once.

In 1907, Shipman moved an amendment to the Qualification of Women (County and Borough Councils) Bill to remove the exclusion of women from being elected chairman of a County Council or as a Mayor of a borough. The Bill eventually became law in 1907 and, inter alia, clarified that women ratepayers were able to be elected to Borough and County Councils.

== Death ==
Shipman died at his home Templemore, Dallington, Northampton on 20 October 1918, aged 70.

== John Greenwood Shipman home ==
In 1930, Shipman’s widow presented their former home in Dallington to the Manfield Hospital, Northampton for use as a convalescent home in the memory of her late husband. It was visited in 1932 by the Duke and Duchess of York (later George VI and Queen Elizabeth The Queen Mother) on their official visit to Northampton.

Parliament of the United Kingdom
Preceded by Henry Labouchère; Adolphus Drucker	Member of Parliament for Northampton; 1900 – January 1910; With: Henry Labouchère 1900–1906; Herbert Paul 1906–January 1910	Succeeded by Hastings Lees-Smith; Charles McCurdy
