= Adolphus Drucker =

Drucker in 1895

Charles Gustavus Adolphus Drucker (1 May 1868 – 10 December 1903) was a Conservative Member of Parliament for Northampton.

He was born in Amsterdam, the third son of Louis Drucker (1807–1884) and Therese nee Temme. He stood for Northampton at the 1892 general election shortly after becoming naturalized as a British citizen. Northampton was a two-member constituency, and Drucker was one of two Conservative candidates running against two Liberal candidates. The Liberals took both seats (with 5439 votes and 5162 votes). Drucker came fourth with 3236 votes, performing better than the local Conservative Association appear to have been expecting.

At the 1895 general election, there were six candidates for the two seats: Drucker and a fellow Conservative; two candidates officially-endorsed by the Liberal party; and one Socialist and one Independent Radical. The "splitting" of the non-Conservative vote allowed Drucker to take the second seat with 3820 votes against the third-placed Edward Harford on 3703 votes.

Drucker did not stand for re-election at the 1900 general election, although he had indicated his intention of doing so during the first half of 1900. His decision not to stand may have been associated with the adverse publicity surrounding certain legal proceedings he was involved in at this time. Barclays Bank were pursuing him for £5000 plus interest on a promissory note he had signed (dated 8 September 1899). Drucker had denied that he was liable to pay that money to Barclays, arguing that he had been the victim of a swindling financier. But judgment was given against him for the amount claimed, plus costs. And it was revealed that there were two further promissory notes for £5000 each, which Barclays were also pressing him to pay. Following further legal processes a receiving order was eventually made against Drucker in the London Bankruptcy Court in early July 1901.

Drucker had travelled to British Columbia in the early part of 1901, and was not present when the first meeting of his creditors was convened at the London Bankruptcy Court on 23 July 1901. His legal representative (Mr. Alfred Beyfus) told the meeting: "When the debtor came to this country a few years ago he had a fortune of something like £300,000, which he had inherited from his father, and no doubt he had lost the major part of it in investments in companies and kindred matters. The family was a very wealthy one and would probably come forward with an offer to the creditors." The meeting was adjourned for a fortnight to allow Beyfus to attempt to communicate with Drucker and his family regarding the making of such an offer. When the meeting was reconvened on 6 August 1901, Beyfus stated that he had received a cablegram from Drucker in which he stated that he intended to return to London in late September, and asked for a further postponement of proceedings until after his return. This meeting resolved to adjudicate Drucker bankrupt, and to appoint a trustee and a committee of inspection.

The standard procedure following Drucker`s being adjudicated bankrupt would have been for him to file with the Bankruptcy Court a statement of his accounts/financial affairs, and to "surrender" to the Court to face a public examination. The public examination was initially scheduled for 27 August 1901. Upon the case being called, the Senior Official Receiver stated that Drucker had not "surrendered" nor had any accounts been filed. The public examination was adjourned to 24 October. On 24 October 1901, the situation was the same, "it being stated that Mr. Drucker was ill in Switzerland". The public examination was postponed to 12 December. On 12 December, it was reported that Drucker had still not "surrendered" or filed any accounts. The public examination was postponed to 30 January 1902. During January 1902, there was finally some movement: a statement of Drucker's accounts/financial affairs was filed with the Court. But Drucker was absent from the Bankruptcy Court on 30 January, and the public examination was adjourned for a week. To cut a long story short, Drucker never did turn-up at the Bankruptcy Court for public examination, or to give evidence to support his claim that his mother should be recognised as being a significant creditor and should be accorded substantial voting rights regarding the administration of his bankruptcy. On 6 February 1902 the Court was told he was in England, but "too ill to attend" and a medical certificate was put in. On 20 February the Court was told he had gone to Genoa because of the bad weather in England. On 17 March a letter "written from abroad" was read to the Court in explanation of his non-appearance, saying "We are all Dutch, and don't believe in English justice".

Drucker died in Bellevue Hospital, New York on 10 December 1903.

Parliament of the United Kingdom
Preceded by Henry Labouchère; Moses Manfield	Member of Parliament for Northampton; 1895 – 1900; With: Henry Labouchère	Succeeded by Henry Labouchère; John Greenwood Shipman
