= Francis Beale (MP) =

English politician

Francis Beale (Dec. 1577 – at least 1637), of Barnes, Surrey and later of Newport, Isle of Wight, was an English politician.

He was a member (MP) of the parliament of England for Northampton in 1614.
