= George Newton, 1st Baron Eltisley =

British politician (1879-1942)

George Douglas Cochrane Newton, 1st Baron Eltisley, KBE (14 July 1879 – 2 September 1942) was a Conservative Party politician in the United Kingdom.

Newton was educated at Eton and Trinity College, Cambridge. He was appointed High Sheriff of Cambridgeshire and Huntingdonshire for 1909. Following the First World War, he joined the Rural Reconstruction in the Department of the Ministry of Reconstruction. He was invested as a Knight Commander of the Order of the British Empire in the 1919 New Year Honours.

He was then elected as Member of Parliament for Cambridge at a by-election in 1922 following the resignation of the Conservative MP Sir Eric Geddes.

Newton retained the seat at the 1922 general election, and was re-elected at four further elections until he was elevated to the peerage in 1934 as Baron Eltisley, of Croxton in the County of Cambridge. The title became extinct on his death in September 1942, aged 63.

Newton married Muriel Mary Georgina Duke (1888–1953) in 1905. Their daughter the Honourable Myra Newton was first wife of Sir Gifford Fox MP.

Parliament of the United Kingdom
| Preceded by Sir Eric Geddes | Member of Parliament for Cambridge; 1922–1934 | Succeeded by Richard Tufnell |
Peerage of the United Kingdom
| New creation | Baron Eltisley; 1934–1942 | Extinct |
