= Henry Labouchère =

British politician, writer, publisher and theatre owner

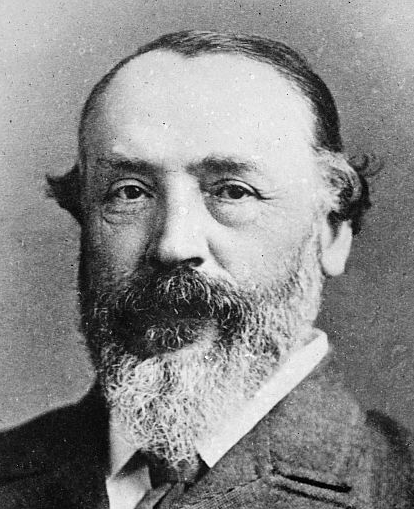

Member of Parliament for Middlesex
- In office 15 April 1867 – 21 November 1868
- Preceded by: Robert Culling Hanbury
- Succeeded by: George Hamilton

Member of Parliament for Northampton
- In office 27 April 1880 – 12 January 1906
- Succeeded by: Herbert Paul

Personal details
- Born: 9 November 1831 London, England
- Died: 15 January 1912 (aged 80) Florence
- Political party: Liberal
- Spouse: Henrietta Hodson (m. 1887)
- Education: Eton College
- Alma mater: Trinity College, Cambridge
- Occupation: writer, publisher and theatre owner
- Known for: Labouchere Amendment criminalising male homosexual activity

Henry Du Pré Labouchère (9 November 1831 – 15 January 1912) was an English politician, writer, publisher and theatre owner in the Victorian and Edwardian eras. He is now most remembered for the Labouchère Amendment, which for the first time criminalised all male homosexual activity in the United Kingdom.

Labouchère, who came from a wealthy Huguenot banking family, was a junior member of the British diplomatic service before briefly serving in Parliament in 1865–68. He lived with the actress Henrietta Hodson from 1868, and they married in 1887. He made a name for himself as a journalist and theatre producer, first buying a stake in The Daily News and in 1876 founding the magazine Truth, which he bankrolled during an extensive series of libel suits.

In 1880, he returned to Parliament as the Liberal member for Northampton, and became a key figure in the radical Home Rule wing of the party. He was a controversial figure, and opposition from Queen Victoria as well as from senior Liberals ensured that he was never given a ministerial position. He became increasingly unpopular because of his opposition to the Second Boer War, and resigned from politics in 1906, when he left Britain and retired to Italy.

== Early life ==
Labouchère was born in London to a family of Huguenot extraction, (Note: The family name is variously given as Labouchère or Labouchere; both he and other members of his family used both forms during his lifetime.) the eldest of three sons and six daughters of John Peter Labouchère (d. 1863) and Mary Louisa née Du Pré (1799–1863). John, who settled at Broome Hall, was a partner in the banking house of Thomas Hope, and then in Deacon's; his uncle, also called Henry Labouchère (d. 1869), entered politics and served in Parliament from 1826 to 1859, when he was made a peer as Baron Taunton. Despite disapproving of Labouchère, his uncle helped the young man's early career and left him a sizeable inheritance when he died leaving no male heir. His grandfather Pierre (Peter) César Labouchère was also a partner in Hope's, and married a daughter of Sir Francis Baring. His mother Mary was from an English nabob family, the daughter of James Du Pré MP, a nephew of Lord Caledon, and his wife Madeline Maxwell, a niece of the Duchess of Gordon.

Labouchère was educated at Eton and Trinity College, Cambridge, where, he later said, he "diligently attended the racecourse at Newmarket", losing £6,000 in gambling in two years. (Note: Labouchère remained an avid gambler and is credited with devising the Labouchere system, a betting strategy for organising play at roulette and other games of chance.) He was accused of cheating in an examination, and his degree was withheld. Leaving Cambridge, he was sent to South America to look after family business interests there; however, he ended up working in a circus troupe in Mexico and lived for several months in an Ojibwe camp near Minneapolis.

== Early diplomatic and political career ==
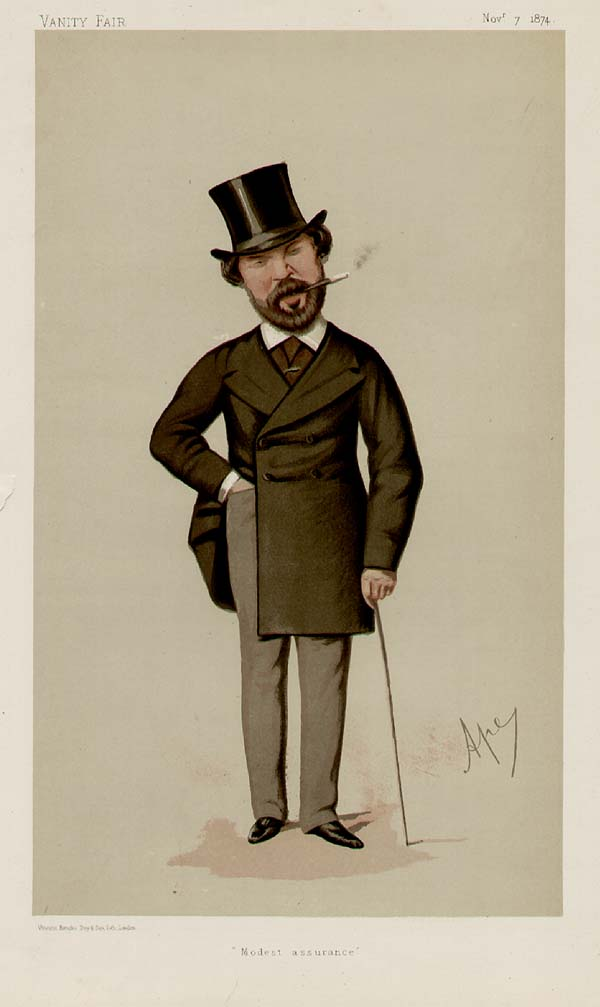
Caricature of Labouchère by Ape in Vanity Fair, 1874

While he was in the US, Labouchère (without his prior knowledge) was found a place in the British diplomatic service by his family. Between 1854 and 1864, he served as a minor diplomat in Washington, Munich, Stockholm, Frankfurt, Saint Petersburg, Dresden, and Constantinople. He was, however, not known for his diplomatic demeanour, and acted impudently on occasion. He went too far when he wrote to the Foreign Secretary to refuse a posting offered to him, "I have the honour to acknowledge the receipt of your Lordship's despatch, informing me of my promotion as Second Secretary to Her Majesty's Legation at Buenos Ayres. I beg to state that, if residing at Baden-Baden I can fulfil those duties, I shall be pleased to accept the appointment." He was politely told that there was no further use for his services.

The year after his dismissal, Labouchère was elected at the 1865 general election as a member of parliament (MP) for Windsor, as a Liberal. However, that election was overturned on petition, and in April 1867 he was elected at a by-election as an MP for Middlesex. At the 1868 election he lost the seat by 110 votes. He did not return to the House of Commons for 12 years.

== Theatre producer, journalist and writer ==
In 1867, Labouchère and his partners engaged the architect C. J. Phipps and the artists Albert Moore and Telbin to remodel the large St. Martins Hall to create Queen's Theatre, Long Acre. A new company of players was formed, including Charles Wyndham, Henry Irving, J. L. Toole, Ellen Terry, and Henrietta Hodson. By 1868, Hodson and Labouchère were living together out of wedlock, as they could not marry until her first husband died in 1887. Labouchère bought out his partners and used the theatre to promote Hodson's talents; the theatre made a loss, Hodson retired, and the theatre closed in 1879. The couple finally married in 1887. They had one child together, Mary Dorothea (Dora) Labouchère (1884–1944).

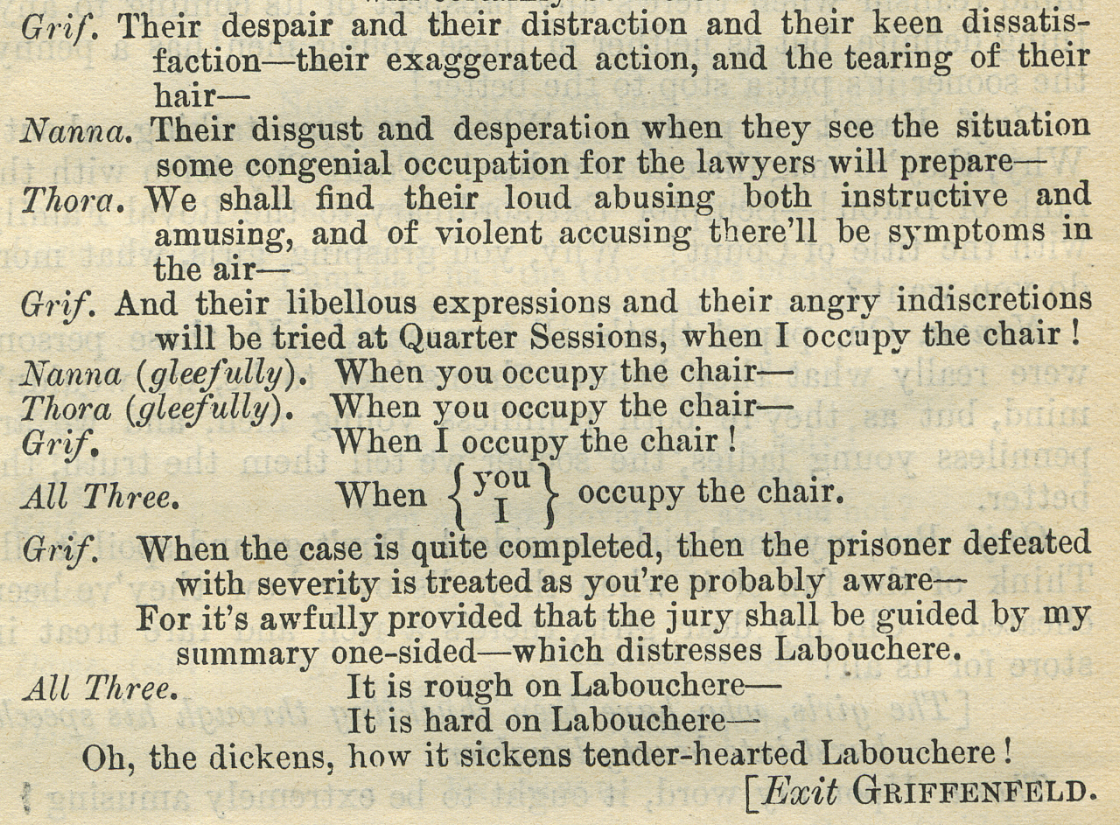
Third verse of "When a gentleman supposes" from His Excellency by W. S. Gilbert.

During the break in his Parliamentary career, Labouchère gained renown as a journalist, editor, and publisher, sending witty dispatches from Paris during the Siege of Paris in 1870–1871, noting the eating of zoo elephants, donkeys, cats and rats when food supplies ran low. This series of articles helped restore the circulation of the Daily News, in which he had bought a stake in 1868. His unflinching style gained a large audience for first his reporting, and later his personal weekly journal, Truth (started in 1876), which was often sued for libel. With his inherited wealth, he could afford to defend such suits. Labouchère's claims to being impartial were ridiculed by his critics, including W. S. Gilbert (who had been an object of Labouchère's theatrical criticism) in Gilbert's comic opera His Excellency (see illustration at right). In 1877, Gilbert had engaged in a public feud with Labouchère's lover Henrietta Hodson.

Labouchère was a vehement opponent of feminism; he campaigned in Truth against the suffrage movement, ridiculing and belittling women who sought the right to vote. He was also a virulent anti-semite, opposed to Jewish participation in British life, using Truth to campaign against "Hebrew barons" and their supposedly excessive influence, "Jewish exclusivity" and "Jewish cowardice". One of the victims of his attacks was Edward Levy-Lawson, proprietor of The Daily Telegraph. In 1879 there was a much-reported court case following a fracas on the doorstep of the Beefsteak Club between Labouchère and Levy-Lawson. The committee of the club expelled Labouchère, who successfully sought a court ruling that they had no right to do so.

== Return to Parliament ==
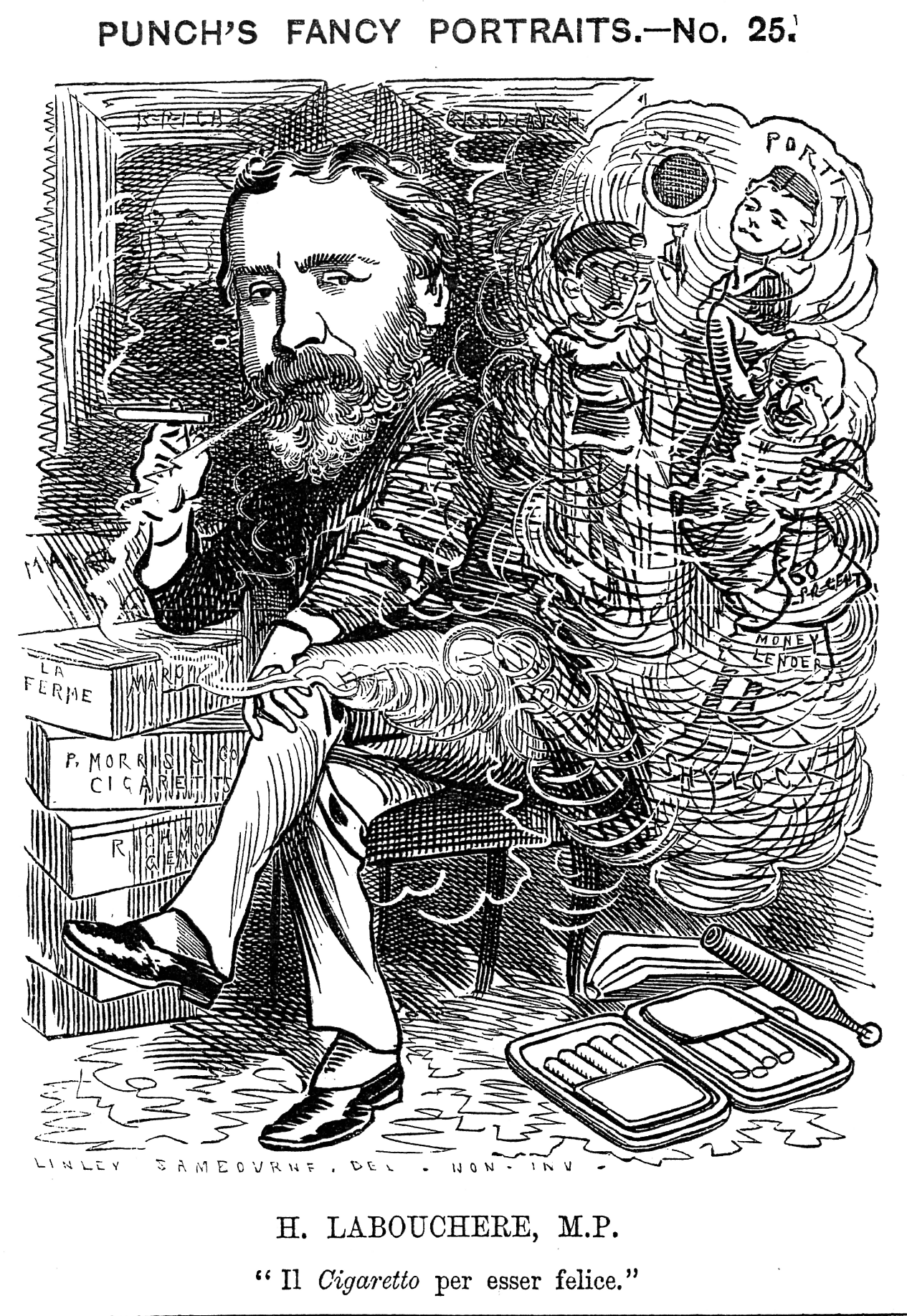
1881 Punch cartoon

Labouchère returned to Parliament in the 1880 election, when he and Charles Bradlaugh, both Liberals, won the two seats for Northampton. (Bradlaugh's then-controversial atheism led Labouchère, a closet agnostic, to refer sardonically to himself as "the Christian member for Northampton".)

In 1884, Labouchère unsuccessfully proposed legislation to extend the existing laws against cruelty to animals. In 1885, Labouchère, whose libertarian stances did not preclude a fierce homophobia, drafted the Labouchère Amendment as a last-minute addition to a Parliamentary Bill that had nothing to do with homosexuality. (Note: The Criminal Law Amendment Bill, 1885 was introduced to outlaw sex between men and underage girls.) His amendment outlawed "gross indecency"; sodomy was already a crime, but Labouchère's Amendment now criminalised any sexual activity between men. (Note: Labouchère's contemporary Frank Harris wrote that Labouchère proposed the amendment to make the law seem "ridiculous" and so discredit it in its entirety; some historians agree, citing Labouchère's habitual obstructionism and other attempts to sink this bill by the same means. Others write that Labouchère's role in the Cleveland Street scandal makes it plain that he was strongly in favour of using the criminal law to control male sexuality, despite his own irregular private life.) Ten years later the Labouchère Amendment allowed for the prosecution of Oscar Wilde, who was given the maximum sentence of two years' imprisonment with hard labour. Labouchère expressed regret that Wilde's sentence was so short, and would have preferred the seven-year term he had originally proposed in the Amendment.

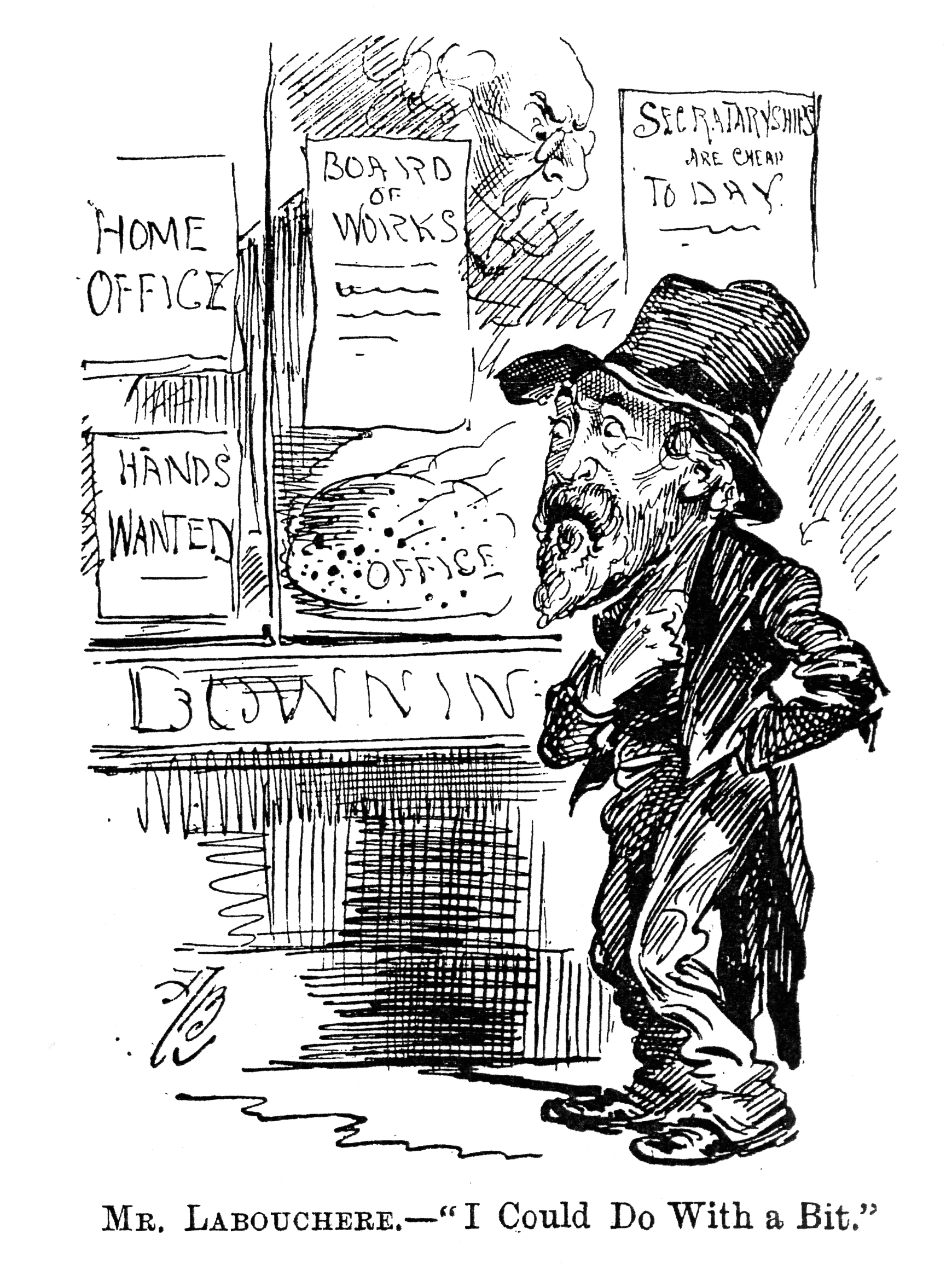
1892 cartoon of Labouchère as a hungry tramp; Gladstone eyes him from within the parliamentary bakery.

During the 1880s, the Liberal Party faced a split between a Radical wing (led by Joseph Chamberlain) and a Whig wing (led by the Marquess of Hartington), with its party leader, William Ewart Gladstone straddling the middle. Labouchère was a firm and vocal Radical, who tried to create a governing coalition between the Radicals and the Irish Nationalists that would exclude or marginalise the Whigs. This plan was wrecked in 1886, when, after Gladstone came out for Home Rule, a large contingent of both Radicals and Whigs chose to leave the Liberal Party to form the Liberal Unionist Party allied with the Conservatives.

Between 1886 and 1892, a Conservative government was in power, and Labouchère worked tirelessly to remove them from office. When the government was turned out in 1892, and Gladstone was called to form an administration, Labouchère expected to be rewarded with a cabinet post. Queen Victoria refused to allow Gladstone to offer either Labouchère or Charles Dilke an office, however, as she had a strong personal dislike of them – "she would never allow such horrid men to enter the Gov^{t}". Her dislike of Labouchère stemmed from his editorship of Truth, which she felt had insulted the Royal Family. According to the historian Vernon Bogdanor, this was the last time a British monarch vetoed a prime minister's appointment of a cabinet minister. (Note: Francis Beckett (quoting from the diaries of Sir Alan Lascelles) claims otherwise, suggesting that George VI vetoed the appointment of Hugh Dalton as foreign secretary by Clement Attlee in 1945. Roy Jenkins, however, notes that Attlee ignored the king's advice, which was given on 26 July 1945, and offered the foreign secretaryship to Dalton the following day, later changing his mind after receiving representations from Herbert Morrison and senior civil servants.) However, Gladstone may have been happy to drop Labouchère given his lack of political support. Likewise, the new foreign secretary, Lord Rosebery, a personal enemy of Labouchère, declined to offer him the ambassadorship to Washington for which Labouchère had asked.

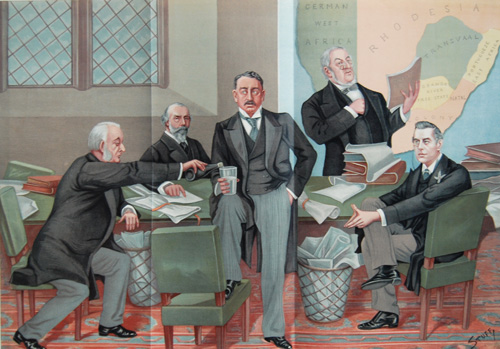
"Empire Makers and Breakers": scene at the South Africa Committee 1897. Left to right: Richard Webster, Labouchère, Cecil Rhodes, William Harcourt, Joseph Chamberlain

Through the 1890s, Labouchère was a critic of both Liberal and Conservative Imperial policies; he demanded an enquiry into Rhodesian policy in 1893–94, and in 1895 sat on the commission enquiring into the Jameson Raid. However, his position became gradually alienated from his party and from public opinion, as he strongly opposed the South African War and argued for peace. His reputation was also tarnished by a series of financial scandals: in 1897, he was accused in the press of share-rigging, using Truth to disparage companies, advising shareholders to dispose of their shares and, when the share prices fell as a result, buying them himself at a low price. He failed to reply to the accusations, and his reputation suffered. A later pamphlet by Henry Hess of The Critic, in 1905, revealed further financial misdealings.

== Retirement ==
When the Liberal party took power in December 1905, Labouchère was not offered any political office by Henry Campbell-Bannerman, the new prime minister. He was disappointed in this – he had been a strong supporter of Campbell-Bannerman – and retired from Parliament the following month, choosing not to stand at the 1906 general election. His only political reward from the new government was a privy councillorship.

He retired to Florence, Italy, where he died seven years later, leaving a fortune of half a million pounds sterling (Note: £500,000 in 1912 equates to around £62,530,000 in 2023, according to calculations based on the Consumer Price Index measure of inflation.) to his daughter Dora, who was by then married to Carlo, Marchese di Rudini.

== Sources ==
- Beckett, Francis (2000). Clement Attlee. Politico's Publishing Limited. p. 199. ISBN 1-902301-70-6.
- Bogdanor, Vernon (1997). The Monarchy and the Constitution. Oxford: Oxford University Press. ISBN 0-19-829334-8.
- Jenkins, Roy (1998). The Chancellors. London: Macmillan. ISBN 0-333-73057-7.
- Sherson, Erroll (1925). London's Lost Theatres of the Nineteenth Century. London: Bodley Head. OCLC 51413815.
- Thorold, Algar (1913). The Life of Henry Labouchere. New York and London: G. P. Putnam's Sons. OCLC 400277.

== Works (examples) ==
- Diary of the besieged resident in Paris, Hurst and Blackett, London 1871
- The Brown Man's Burden, a parody by Labouchère of Rudyard Kipling's "The White Man's Burden"; Truth and Literary Digest (Feb. 1899)

== Notes and references ==
Notes

Parliament of the United Kingdom
Preceded by Richard Vyse; William Vansittart	Member of Parliament for Windsor; 1865 – 1866; With: Sir Henry Hoare, Bt	Succeeded by Charles Edwards; Roger Eykyn
Preceded by Robert Culling Hanbury; George Byng	Member of Parliament for Middlesex; 1867 – 1868; With: George Byng	Succeeded by Lord George Hamilton; George Byng
Preceded by Pickering Phipps; Charles Merewether	Member of Parliament for Northampton; 1880 – 1906; With: Charles Bradlaugh 1880–1891; Moses Manfield 1891–1895; Charles Drucker 1895–1900; John Greenwood Shipman from 1900	Succeeded by Herbert Paul; John Greenwood Shipman
