= Charles McCurdy =

British politician

Charles McCurdy PC
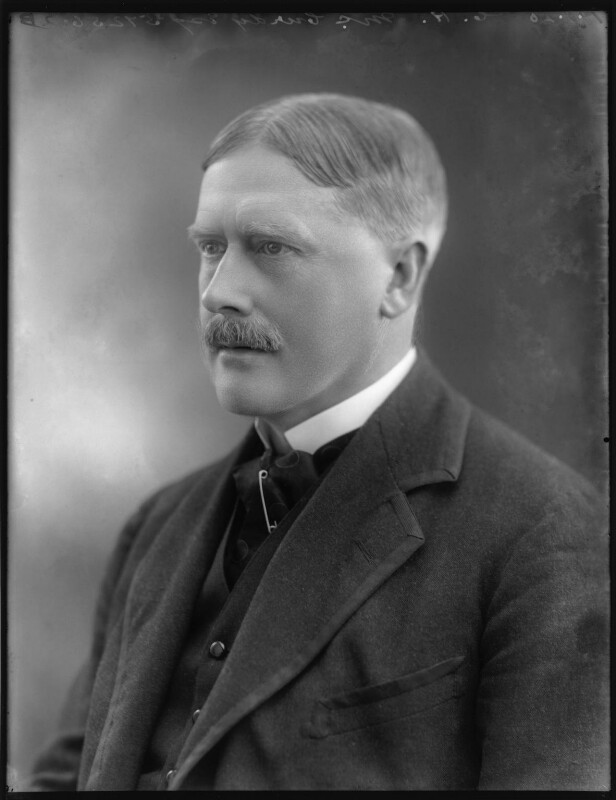

Government Chief Whip in the House of Commons; Parliamentary Secretary to the Treasury
- In office 1 April 1921 – 19 October 1922 Serving with Leslie Wilson
- Monarch: George V
- Prime Minister: David Lloyd George
- Preceded by: Freddie Guest
- Succeeded by: Leslie Wilson

Coalition Liberal Chief Whip (Note: Became National Liberals in January 1922)
- In office 1 April 1921 – 20 December 1922
- Leader: David Lloyd George
- Preceded by: Freddie Guest
- Succeeded by: Edward Hilton Young

Minister of Food Control
- In office 19 March 1920 – 31 March 1921
- Prime Minister: David Lloyd George
- Preceded by: George Roberts
- Succeeded by: Office abolished

Parliamentary Secretary to the Ministry of Food Control
- In office 27 January 1919 – 19 March 1920
- Prime Minister: David Lloyd George
- Preceded by: Waldorf Astor
- Succeeded by: William Mitchell-Thomson

Member of Parliament for Northampton
- In office 15 January 1910 – 6 December 1923
- Preceded by: John Greenwood Shipman
- Succeeded by: Margaret Bondfield

Personal details
- Born: Charles Albert McCurd; 13 March 1870
- Died: 10 November 1941 (aged 71)
- Party: Liberal (Before 1916, 1923–1941)
- Other political affiliations: Coalition Liberal (1916–1922); National Liberal (1922–1923)
- Relatives: Margaret Wingfield (niece)
- Education: Loughborough Grammar School
- Alma mater: Pembroke College, Cambridge
- Profession: Barrister

Charles Albert McCurdy (13 March 1870 – 10 November 1941) was a British Liberal Member of Parliament and minister in the Lloyd George Coalition Government. He was made a member of the Privy Council in 1920.

== Early life and career ==
McCurdy was educated at Loughborough Grammar School and Pembroke College, Cambridge. He then became a barrister.

== Political career ==
McCurdy

He was elected Member of Parliament for Northampton, then a two-member constituency, in 1910. He was returned in 1918 when it was reduced to a single-member seat, his former Liberal co-member Hastings Lees-Smith having sought election elsewhere and joined the Labour Party.

=== Coalition government ===
He was Parliamentary Secretary to the Ministry of Food Control from 1919 to 1920 and then Minister of Food Control in 1920. After the Ministry of Food Control was abolished in April 1921, he was appointed Coalition Liberal Chief Whip (officially 'Parliamentary Secretary to the Treasury') in succession to Frederick Guest. Guest had held the position during the 1918 seat negotiations with the Unionists. Unlike Guest, McCurdy was more concerned with strengthening the Liberals part in the Coalition and took a much tougher line with the Unionists. A junior Unionist whip Robert Sanders, wrote in his diary that McCurdy was "a particularly bad-mannered fellow...the reverse...of Guest".

McCurdy favoured a general election in January 1922 and the formation of a Centre Party made up of Liberals, moderate Conservatives and moderate Labour MPs. In March 1922, McCurdy wrote to Lloyd George claiming that one hundred Unionist MPs would defect if a Centre Party was formed. Lloyd George, however, decided to stay with the Coalition. He left office with Lloyd George when the Unionists ended the coalition in October 1922.

=== Liberal reunion ===
After the coalition ended, McCurdy favoured Liberal reunion. He was influential in drawing up the Liberals' manifesto for the 1923 general election, moving it further in a free trade direction. However, he was not returned at that election. He died in November 1941, aged 71, a month before his former co-member for Northampton, Hastings Lees-Smith.

McCurdy's niece, Margaret Wingfield, was an influential member of the Liberal Party, and eventually its President.

=== Elections contested ===
==== UK Parliament elections ====
Date of election	Constituency	Party	Votes	%	Result
1906	Winchester	Liberal	1,272	49.0	Not elected (2nd)
1910 (Jan)	Northampton	Liberal	5,289	22.9*	Elected
1910 (Dec)	Northampton	Liberal	6,179	28.6*	Elected
1918	Northampton	Coalition Liberal	18,010	62.7	Elected
1922	Northampton	National Liberal	19,974	52.3	Elected
1923	Northampton	Liberal	11,342	29.5	Not elected (3rd)

== Note ==
Parliament of the United Kingdom
Preceded by Herbert Paul; John Greenwood Shipman	Member of Parliament for Northampton; January 1910 – 1923; With: Hastings Lees-Smith, 1910–1918	Succeeded by Margaret Bondfield
Political offices
Preceded by George Henry Roberts	Minister of Food Control; 1920 – 1921	Office abolished
Preceded by Freddie Guest	Government Chief Whip in the House of Commons; Parliamentary Secretary to the Treasury; 1921 – 1922; With: Leslie Wilson	Succeeded by Leslie Wilson
Party political offices
Preceded by Freddie Guest	Coalition Liberal Chief Whip; 1921–1922	Party reorganized as National Liberals
New political party	National Liberal Chief Whip; 1922	Succeeded by Edward Hilton Young
