= Northampton (constituency) =

Parliamentary constituency in the United Kingdom, 1918–1974

- Former borough constituency for the House of Commons
- County: Northamptonshire
- Major settlements: Northampton

1295–1918
- Seats: 2

1918–1974
- Type of constituency: borough constituency
- Replaced by: Northampton North (Majority) and Northampton South (Part)

Northampton was a parliamentary constituency (centred on the town of Northampton), which existed until 1974.

It returned two Members of Parliament (MPs) to the House of Commons of England until 1707, the House of Commons of Great Britain until 1800 and to the House of Commons of the Parliament of the United Kingdom until its representation was reduced to one member for the 1918 general election. The constituency was abolished for the February 1974 general election, when it was replaced by the new constituencies of Northampton North and Northampton South.

A former MP of note for the constituency was Spencer Perceval, the only British Prime Minister to be assassinated.

== Members of Parliament ==
=== MPs 1295–1640 ===
- 1295: constituency established, electing two MPs

Parliament	First member	Second member
1377	Sir Gerard de Braybooke of Castle Ashby	
1377	Sir Thomas Preston of Gretton	
1378	Sir John Seton	
1379	Sir Thomas Preston of Gretton	
1380	Sir Thomas Preston of Gretton	
1382	Giles St John of Plumpton	
1386	William Spriggy	William Ringwood
1388 (Feb)	Thomas Pirie	John Stotesbury
1388 (Sep)	John Honybourne	John Besford
1390 (Jan)	John Colingtree	John Sywell
1390 (Nov)		
1391	William Begworth	John Stotesbury
1393	William Spriggy	Stephen Wappenham
1394		
1395	Nicholas Horncastle	John Woodward
1397 (Jan)	Richard Stormsworth	Thomas Overton
1397 (Sep)		
1399	John Loudham	John Spring
1401		
1406	Henry Empingham	Thomas Wintringham
1407	John Rivell	John Temple
1410	Simon Dunstall	John Lincoln
1411	Richard Wems	William Rushden
1413 (Feb)		
1413 (May)	Roger Maltman	Alexander Deyster
1414 (Apr)		
1414 (Nov)	Geoffrey Balde	John Hethersett
1415		
1416 (Mar)	John Hendley	John Buckingham
1416 (Oct)		
1417	William Clerk	Thomas Colley
1419	Thomas Stotesbury	Ralph Passenham
1420	William Maltman	William Harpole
1421 (May)	John Bernhill	John Colden
1421 (Dec)	John Spriggy	Stephen Kynnesman
1427	Thomas Compworth	
1477–1478	Robert Pemberton	
1510–1515	No names known	
1523	John Parvyn	Thomas Doddington
1529	Lawrence Manley	Nicholas Rand
1536	?	
1539	?	
1542	?	
1545	?	
1547	Richard Wenman	Anthony Bryan
1553 (Mar)	George Tresham	William Chauncy
1553 (Oct)	Francis Morgan	Lawrence Manley
1554 (Apr)	Francis Morgan	John Horpool
1554 (Nov)	Henry Clerke	Ralph Freeman
1555	Nicholas Rand	John Balgye
1558	Thomas Colles	Edward Manley
1559 (Jan)	William Carvell	Edmund (or Edward) Kinwelmersh
1562–3	Lewis Montgomery	Ralph Lane
1571	Christopher Yelverton	William Lane|-
1572 (Apr)	Christopher Yelverton	John Spencer
1584 (Nov)	Sir Richard Knightley	Thomas Catesby
1586 (Sep)	Sir Richard Knightley	Peter Wentworth
1588 (Oct)	Peter Wentworth	Richard Knollys
1593	Valentine Knightley	Peter Wentworth
1597 (Oct)	Christopher Yelverton	Henry Yelverton
1601	Henry Hickman	Francis Tate
1604	Henry Yelverton	Edward Mercer
1614	Henry Yelverton	Francis Beale
1621–1622	Richard Spencer	Thomas Crewe
1624	Richard Spencer	Christopher Sherland
1625	Richard Spencer	Christopher Sherland
1626	Richard Spencer	Christopher Sherland
1628	Richard Spencer	Christopher Sherland
1629–1640	No Parliaments convened	

=== MPs 1640–1918 ===
Election	First member	First party	Second member	Second party
April 1640	Richard Knightley	Parliamentarian	Zouch Tate	Parliamentarian
November 1640	Richard Knightley	Parliamentarian	Zouch Tate	Parliamentarian
December 1648	Knightley excluded in Pride's Purge – seat vacant		Tate not recorded as sitting after Pride's Purge	
1653	Northampton was unrepresented in the Barebones Parliament			
1654	Peter Whalley		Northampton had only one seat in the First and Second Parliaments of the Protectorate	
1656	Francis Harvey		Northampton had only one seat in the First and Second Parliaments of the Protectorate	
January 1659	Francis Harvey		James Langham	
May 1659	Not represented in the restored Rump			
March 1660	Francis Harvey		Richard Rainsford	
June 1660	Sir John Norwich, Bt.		Richard Rainsford	
April 1661	Francis Harvey		James Langham	
November 1661	Sir Charles Compton		Richard Rainsford	
1662	Sir James Langham, Bt.		Richard Rainsford	
March 1663	Sir William Dudley, Bt.		Richard Rainsford	
April 1663	Hon. Christopher Hatton		Richard Rainsford	
March 1664	Hon. Christopher Hatton		Sir John Bernard	
April 1664	Hon. Christopher Hatton		Sir Henry Yelverton, Bt.	
1670	Sir William Fermor		Henry O'Brien	
1678	Sir William Fermor		Hon. Ralph Montagu	
February 1679	Sir William Fermor		Sir Hugh Cholmley, Bt.	
August 1679	William Langham		Hon. Ralph Montagu	
1685	Richard Rainsford		Sir Justinian Isham, Bt.	
1689	William Langham		Sir Justinian Isham, Bt.	
1690	William Langham		Sir Thomas Samwell, Bt.	
1694	William Langham		Sir Justinian Isham, Bt.	
1695	Christopher Montagu		Sir Justinian Isham, Bt.	
1698	Christopher Montagu		William Thursby	
1701	Christopher Montagu		Thomas Andrew	
1702	Sir Matthew Dudley, Bt.		Bartholomew Tate	
1704	Sir Matthew Dudley, Bt.		Francis Arundell	
1705	George Montagu		Francis Arundell	
1710	George Montagu		William Wykes	
1715	William Wilmer		William Wykes	
1722	William Wilmer		Edward Montagu	
1727	Hon. George Compton		Edward Montagu	
1734	Hon. George Compton		William Wilmer	
1744	Hon. George Compton		George Montagu	
April 1754	Hon. George Compton		Charles Montagu	
December 1754	Hon. Charles Compton		Charles Montagu	
1755	Richard Backwell		Charles Montagu	
1759	Richard Backwell		Frederick Montagu	
1761	Spencer Compton		Frederick Montagu	
1763	Lucy Knightley		Frederick Montagu	
1768	Vice-Admiral Sir George Brydges Rodney		Sir George Osborn, Bt.	
1769	Vice-Admiral Sir George Brydges Rodney		Hon. Thomas Howe	
1771	Vice-Admiral Sir George Brydges Rodney		Wilbraham Tollemache	
1774	Sir George Robinson, 5th Bt.		Wilbraham Tollemache	
1780	George Spencer	Whig	George Rodney	
1782	George Bingham	Tory	George Rodney	
1784	Charles Compton	Tory	Fiennes Trotman	Whig
1790	Charles Compton	Tory	Hon. Edward Bouverie	Whig
1796	Hon. Spencer Perceval	Tory	Hon. Edward Bouverie	Whig
1810	Hon. Spencer Perceval	Tory	William Hanbury	Whig
1812	Spencer Compton	Tory	William Hanbury	Whig
1818	Spencer Compton	Tory	Sir Edward Kerrison, Bt.	Tory
1820	Sir George Robinson, 6th Bt.	Whig	William Leader Maberly	Whig
1830	Sir George Robinson, 6th Bt.	Whig	Sir Robert Gunning, Bt.	Tory
1831	Sir George Robinson, 6th Bt.	Whig	Robert Vernon Smith	Whig
1832	Charles Ross	Tory	Robert Vernon Smith	Whig
1834	Charles Ross	Conservative	Robert Vernon Smith	Whig
1837	Raikes Currie	Radical	Robert Vernon Smith	Whig
1857	Charles Gilpin	Radical	Robert Vernon Smith	Whig
1859	Charles Gilpin	Liberal	Robert Vernon Smith	Liberal
1859 by-election	Charles Gilpin	Liberal	Anthony Henley	Liberal
February 1874	Charles Gilpin	Liberal	Pickering Phipps	Conservative
October 1874 by-election	Charles Merewether	Conservative	Pickering Phipps	Conservative
1880	Henry Labouchère	Liberal	Charles Bradlaugh	Liberal
1891 by-election	Henry Labouchère	Liberal	Philip Manfield	Liberal
1895	Henry Labouchère	Liberal	Adolphus Drucker	Conservative
1900	Henry Labouchère	Liberal	John Greenwood Shipman	Liberal
1906	Herbert Paul	Liberal	John Greenwood Shipman	Liberal
Jan. 1910	Hastings Lees-Smith	Liberal	Charles McCurdy	Liberal
1916	Hastings Lees-Smith	Liberal	Charles McCurdy	Coalition Liberal
1918	Representation reduced to one member			

=== MPs 1918–1974 ===
Election	Member	Party	Notes
1918	Charles McCurdy	Coalition Liberal	Government Chief Whip (1921–1922)
1922	Charles McCurdy	National Liberal	
Nov 1923	Charles McCurdy	Liberal	
Dec 1923	Margaret Bondfield	Labour	
1924	Arthur Holland	Conservative	Died December 1927
1928 by-election	Cecil Malone	Labour	Member for Leyton East (1918–1922)
1931	Mervyn Manningham-Buller	Conservative	Member for Kettering (1924–1929)
1940 by-election	Spencer Summers	Conservative	Secretary for Overseas Trade (1945)
1945	Reginald Paget	Labour	
Feb 1974	constituency abolished: see Northampton North		

== Election results ==
=== Elections in the 1830s ===
General election 1830: Northampton
Party	Candidate	Votes	%	±%
Whig	✓ George Robinson	1,376	42.2	
Tory	✓ Sir Robert Gunning, 3rd Baronet	1,315	40.4	
Whig	Raikes Currie	566	17.4	
Turnout		1,919	c. 80.0	
Registered electors		c. 2,400		
Majority		61	1.8	
Whig hold		Swing	−0.2	
Majority		749	23.0	N/A
Tory gain from Whig		Swing	+8.8	

General election 1831: Northampton
Party	Candidate	Votes	%	±%
Whig	✓ George Robinson	1,686	37.5	−4.7
Whig	✓ Robert Vernon Smith	1,383	30.7	+13.3
Tory	Sir Robert Gunning, 3rd Baronet	1,241	27.6	+7.4
Tory	James Lyon	191	4.2	−16.0
Majority		142	3.1	N/A
Turnout		2,404		
Registered electors				
Whig hold		Swing		
Whig gain from Tory		Swing		

- After the election, a 13-day scrutiny was approved by the Mayor and tallies were revised to 1,570 for Robinson, 1,279 for Vernon Smith, 1,157 for Gunning, and 185 for Lyon. 188 votes were rejected.

General election 1832: Northampton
Party	Candidate	Votes	%	±%
Whig	✓ Robert Vernon Smith	1,321	27.8	−2.9
Tory	✓ Charles Ross	1,275	26.9	−0.7
Whig	George Bainbridge	1,191	25.1	−12.4
Tory	Henry FitzRoy	958	20.2	+16.0
Turnout		2,406	96.4	
Registered electors		2,497		
Majority		46	0.9	−2.2
Whig hold		Swing	−5.3	
Majority		84	1.8	N/A
Tory gain from Whig		Swing	−3.5	

General election 1835: Northampton
Party	Candidate	Votes	%	±%
Whig	✓ Robert Vernon Smith	1,119	35.2	+7.4
Conservative	✓ Charles Ross	1,111	34.9	−12.2
Whig	Charles Hill	951	29.9	+4.8
Turnout		c. 1,591	c. 73.0	c. −23.4
Registered electors		2,178		
Majority		8	0.3	−0.6
Whig hold		Swing	+6.8	
Majority		160	5.0	+3.2
Conservative hold		Swing	−12.2	

General election 1837: Northampton
Party	Candidate	Votes	%	±%
Whig	✓ Robert Vernon Smith	1,095	35.9	−29.2
Radical	✓ Raikes Currie	1,033	33.8	N/A
Conservative	Charles Ross	925	30.3	−4.6
Turnout		1,922	92.4	c. +19.4
Registered electors		2,079		
Majority		62	2.1	+1.8
Whig hold		Swing	−13.5	
Majority		108	3.5	N/A
Radical gain from Conservative		Swing		

=== Elections in the 1840s ===
General election 1841: Northampton
Party	Candidate	Votes	%	±%
Whig	✓ Robert Vernon	990	32.6	−3.3
Radical	✓ Raikes Currie	970	32.0	−1.8
Conservative	Henry Willoughby	897	29.6	−0.7
Chartist	Peter Murray McDouall	176	5.8	New
Turnout		1,517 (est)	75.9 (est)	c. −16.5
Registered electors		1,997		
Majority		20	0.6	−1.5
Whig hold		Swing	−0.8	
Majority		73	2.4	−1.1
Radical hold		Swing	+0.8	

General election 1847: Northampton
Party	Candidate	Votes	%	±%
Radical	✓ Raikes Currie	897	28.6	−3.4
Whig	✓ Robert Vernon	841	26.8	−5.8
Conservative	Lebbeus Charles Humfrey	652	20.8	+6.0
Conservative	Augustus Frederick Bayford	607	19.3	+4.5
Chartist	John Epps	141	4.5	−1.3
Turnout		1,569 (est)	84.0 (est)	+8.1
Registered electors		1,867		
Majority		56	1.8	−0.6
Radical hold		Swing	−4.3	
Majority		189	6.0	+5.4
Whig hold		Swing	−5.5	

=== Elections in the 1850s ===
Vernon Smith was appointed Secretary of State for War, requiring a by-election.

By-election, 11 February 1852: Northampton
Party	Candidate	Votes	%	±%
Whig	✓ Robert Vernon	823	63.2	+36.4
Conservative	Christopher Markham	480	36.8	+3.3
Majority		343	26.4	+20.4
Turnout		1,303	57.6	−26.4
Registered electors		2,263		
Whig hold		Swing	+16.6	

General election 1852: Northampton
Party	Candidate	Votes	%	±%
Whig	✓ Robert Vernon	855	33.8	+7.0
Radical	✓ Raikes Currie	825	32.6	+4.0
Conservative	George Ward Hunt	745	29.4	−10.7
Chartist	John Ingram Lockhart	106	4.2	−0.3
Turnout		1,585 (est)	70.0 (est)	−14.0
Registered electors		2,263		
Majority		30	1.2	−4.8
Whig hold		Swing	+6.2	
Majority		80	3.2	+1.4
Radical hold		Swing	+4.7	

Vernon Smith was appointed President of the Board of Control, requiring a by-election.

By-election, 5 March 1855: Northampton
Party	Candidate	Votes	%	±%
Whig	✓ Robert Vernon	Unopposed		
Whig hold				

General election 1857: Northampton
Party	Candidate	Votes	%	±%
Whig	✓ Robert Vernon	1,079	37.1	+3.3
Radical	✓ Charles Gilpin	1,011	34.8	+2.2
Conservative	George Ward Hunt	815	28.1	−1.3
Turnout		1,860 (est)	78.3 (est)	+8.3
Registered electors		2,375		
Majority		68	2.3	+1.1
Whig hold		Swing	+2.0	
Majority		196	6.7	+3.5
Radical hold		Swing	+1.4	

General election 1859: Northampton
Party	Candidate	Votes	%	±%
Liberal	✓ Charles Gilpin	1,151	36.5	+1.7
Liberal	✓ Robert Vernon	1,143	36.3	−0.8
Conservative	James Thomas Mackenzie	832	26.4	−1.7
Chartist	Richard Hart	27	0.9	New
Majority		311	9.9	+3.2
Turnout		1,979 (est)	78.3 (est)	0.0
Registered electors		2,526		
Liberal hold		Swing	+1.3	
Liberal hold		Swing	0.0	

Vernon Smith was raised to the peerage, becoming 1st Baron Lyveden, and causing a by-election.

By-election, 5 July 1859: Northampton
Party	Candidate	Votes	%	±%
Liberal	✓ Anthony Henley	Unopposed		
Liberal hold				

=== Elections in the 1860s ===
General election 1865: Northampton
Party	Candidate	Votes	%	±%
Liberal	✓ Anthony Henley	1,269	28.2	−8.1
Liberal	✓ Charles Gilpin	1,250	27.8	−8.7
Conservative	George Frederick Holroyd	1,029	22.9	+9.7
Conservative	Sackville Stopford	950	21.1	+7.9
Majority		221	4.9	−5.0
Turnout		2,249 (est)	85.8 (est)	+7.5
Registered electors		2,620		
Liberal hold		Swing	−8.5	
Liberal hold		Swing	−8.8	

General election 1868: Northampton
Party	Candidate	Votes	%	±%
Liberal	✓ Charles Gilpin	2,691	28.5	+0.7
Liberal	✓ Anthony Henley	2,154	22.8	−5.4
Conservative	Charles Merewether	1,634	17.3	−5.6
Conservative	William Edmonstone Lendrick	1,396	14.8	−6.3
Liberal	Charles Bradlaugh	1,086	11.5	N/A
Liberal	Frederick Richard Lees	492	5.2	N/A
Majority		520	5.5	+0.6
Turnout		4,727 (est)	71.4 (est)	−14.4
Registered electors		6,621		
Liberal hold		Swing	+3.3	
Liberal hold		Swing	+0.2	

=== Elections in the 1870s ===
General election 1874: Northampton
Party	Candidate	Votes	%	±%
Conservative	✓ Pickering Phipps	2,690	25.3	+10.5
Liberal	✓ Charles Gilpin	2,310	21.7	−6.8
Conservative	Charles Merewether	2,175	20.5	+3.2
Liberal	Anthony Henley	1,796	16.9	−5.9
Liberal	Charles Bradlaugh	1,653	15.6	+4.1
Turnout		5,312 (est)	77.8 (est)	+6.4
Registered electors		6,829		
Majority		894	8.4	N/A
Conservative gain from Liberal		Swing	+6.7	
Majority		135	1.2	−4.3
Liberal hold		Swing	−6.8	

Gilpin's death caused a by-election.

By-election, 7 October 1874: Northampton
Party	Candidate	Votes	%	±%
Conservative	✓ Charles Merewether	2,171	37.6	−8.2
Liberal	William Fowler	1,836	31.8	+4.7
Liberal	Charles Bradlaugh	1,766	30.6	+3.5
Majority		335	5.8	N/A
Turnout		5,773	84.5	+6.7
Registered electors		6,829		
Conservative gain from Liberal		Swing	−4.5	

=== Elections in the 1880s ===
General election 1880: Northampton
Party	Candidate	Votes	%	±%
Liberal	✓ Henry Labouchère	4,158	29.8	+2.7
Liberal	✓ Charles Bradlaugh	3,827	27.4	+0.3
Conservative	Pickering Phipps	3,152	22.6	−2.7
Conservative	Charles Merewether	2,826	20.2	−0.3
Majority		675	4.8	−3.6
Turnout		6,982 (est)	85.3 (est)	+7.5
Registered electors		8,189		
Liberal hold		Swing	+1.5	
Liberal gain from Conservative		Swing	+1.5	

Bradlaugh was unseated after voting in the Commons before taking the Oath of Allegiance, causing a by-election.

By-election, 12 April 1881: Northampton
Party	Candidate	Votes	%	±%
Liberal	✓ Charles Bradlaugh	3,437	51.0	−6.2
Conservative	Edward Corbett	3,305	49.0	+6.2
Majority		132	2.0	−2.8
Turnout		6,742	82.4	−2.9 (est)
Registered electors		8,185		
Liberal hold		Swing	−6.2	

Bradlaugh was expelled from the House of Commons due to his continuing prevention from taking the Oath, causing a by-election.

By-election, 4 March 1882: Northampton
Party	Candidate	Votes	%	±%
Liberal	✓ Charles Bradlaugh	3,796	50.7	−6.5
Conservative	Edward Corbett	3,688	49.3	+6.5
Majority		108	1.4	−3.4
Turnout		7,484	89.5	+4.2 (est)
Registered electors		8,361		
Liberal hold		Swing	−6.5	

Bradlaugh resigned and sought election once more, after a resolution to exclude him from the precincts of the House of Commons was sought.

By-election, 21 February 1884: Northampton
Party	Candidate	Votes	%	±%
Liberal	✓ Charles Bradlaugh	4,032	52.4	−4.8
Conservative	Henry Charles Richards	3,664	47.6	+4.8
Majority		368	4.8	0.0
Turnout		7,696	86.6	+1.3 (est)
Registered electors		8,886		
Liberal hold		Swing	−4.8	

General election 1885: Northampton
Party	Candidate	Votes	%	±%
Liberal	✓ Henry Labouchère	4,845	37.1	+7.3
Liberal	✓ Charles Bradlaugh	4,315	33.1	+5.7
Conservative	Henry Charles Richards	3,890	29.8	−13.0
Majority		425	3.3	−1.5
Turnout		8,561	89.3	+4.0 (est)
Registered electors		9,582		
Liberal hold		Swing	+6.9	
Liberal hold		Swing	+6.1	

General election 1886: Northampton
Party	Candidate	Votes	%	±%
Liberal	✓ Henry Labouchère	4,570	28.2	−8.9
Liberal	✓ Charles Bradlaugh	4,353	26.8	−6.3
Liberal Unionist	Richard Turner	3,850	23.7	N/A
Conservative	Thomas Orde Hastings Lees	3,456	21.3	−8.5
Majority		503	3.1	−0.2
Turnout		8,343	87.1	−2.2
Registered electors		9,582		
Liberal hold		Swing	−2.3	
Liberal hold		Swing	−1.0	

=== Elections in the 1890s ===
Bradlaugh's death caused a by-election.

By-election, 12 February 1891: Northampton
Party	Candidate	Votes	%	±%
Liberal	✓ Philip Manfield	5,436	59.4	+4.4
Conservative	Robert Arthur Germaine	3,723	40.6	−4.4
Majority		1,713	18.8	+15.7
Turnout		9,159	84.1	−3.0
Registered electors		10,895		
Liberal hold		Swing	+4.4	

General election 1892: Northampton
Party	Candidate	Votes	%	±%
Liberal	✓ Henry Labouchère	5,439	31.1	+2.9
Liberal	✓ Philip Manfield	5,164	29.5	+2.7
Conservative	Henry Charles Richards	3,651	20.9	−2.8
Conservative	Adolphus Drucker	3,235	18.5	−2.8
Majority		1,513	8.6	+5.5
Turnout		9,078 (est)	81.2	−5.9
Registered electors		11,180		
Liberal hold		Swing	+2.9	
Liberal hold		Swing	+2.8	

General election 1895: Northampton
Party	Candidate	Votes	%	±%
Liberal	✓ Henry Labouchère	4,884	27.0	−4.1
Conservative	✓ Adolphus Drucker	3,820	21.0	+2.5
Lib-Lab	Edward Harford	3,703	20.4	−9.1
Conservative	Jacob Jacobs	3,394	18.7	−2.2
Social Democratic Federation	Frederick George Jones	1,216	6.7	New
Independent Liberal	J. M. Robertson	1,131	6.2	New
Turnout		9,554 (est)	83.5	+2.3
Registered electors		11,442		
Majority		1,490	8.3	−0.3
Liberal hold		Swing	−3.3	
Majority		117	0.6	N/A
Conservative gain from Liberal		Swing	+5.8	

=== Elections in the 1900s ===
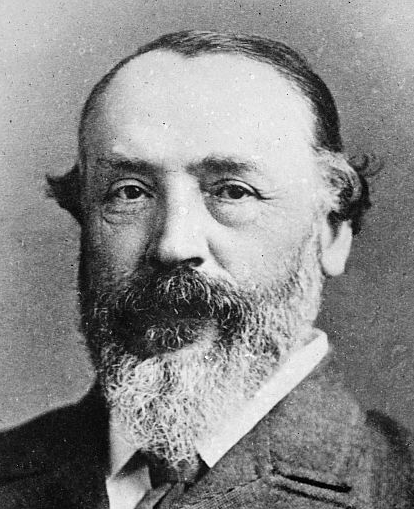
Labouchère

General election 1900: Northampton
Party	Candidate	Votes	%	±%
Liberal	✓ John Shipman	5,437	28.2	+7.8
Liberal	✓ Henry Labouchère	5,281	27.3	+0.3
Conservative	Richard Rouse Boughton Orlebar	4,480	23.2	+2.2
Conservative	H E Randall	4,124	21.3	+2.6
Turnout		19,322	83.1	−0.4
Registered electors		12,180		
Majority		957	5.0	N/A
Liberal gain from Conservative		Swing	+2.8	
Liberal hold		Swing	−1.0	

Paul

Shipman

General election 1906: Northampton
Party	Candidate	Votes	%	±%
Liberal	✓ Herbert Paul	4,479	20.7	−6.6
Liberal	✓ John Shipman	4,244	19.5	−8.7
Conservative	Richard Rouse Boughton Orlebar	4,078	18.8	−4.4
Conservative	Frederic Gorell Barnes	4,000	18.4	−2.9
Social Democratic Federation	Jack Williams	2,544	11.7	New
Social Democratic Federation	James Gribble	2,366	10.9	New
Turnout		21,711	92.0	+8.9
Registered electors		11,954		
Majority		166	0.7	−4.3
Liberal hold		Swing	−1.1	
Liberal hold		Swing	−2.2	

=== Elections in the 1910s ===
McCurdy

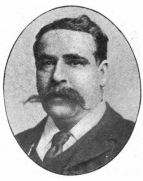
Quelch

General election January 1910: Northampton
Party	Candidate	Votes	%	±%
Liberal	✓ Hastings Lees-Smith	5,398	23.3	+2.6
Liberal	✓ Charles McCurdy	5,289	22.9	+3.4
Conservative	Richard Rouse Boughton Orlebar	4,569	19.8	+1.0
Conservative	Frederic Gorell Barnes	4,464	19.3	+0.9
Social Democratic Federation	James Gribble	1,792	7.7	−4.0
Social Democratic Federation	Harry Quelch	1,617	7.0	−3.9
Majority		720	3.1	+2.4
Turnout		23,129	92.7	+0.7
Liberal hold				
Liberal hold				

General election December 1910: Northampton
Party	Candidate	Votes	%	±%
Liberal	✓ Charles McCurdy	6,179	28.6	+5.7
Liberal	✓ Hastings Lees-Smith	6,025	27.8	+4.5
Conservative	F. C. Parker	4,885	22.6	+2.8
Conservative	J. V. Collier	4,550	21.0	+1.7
Majority		1,140	5.2	+2.1
Turnout		21,639	87.7	−5.0
Liberal hold				
Liberal hold				

A General Election was due to take place by the end of 1915. By the summer of 1914, the following candidates had been adopted to contest that election. Due to the outbreak of war, the election never took place.

- British Socialist Party: Ben Tillett

McCurdy

General election 1918: Northampton
Party		Candidate	Votes	%
C	National Liberal	Charles McCurdy	18,010	62.7
	Labour	Walter Halls	10,735	37.3
Majority			7,275	25.4
Turnout			28,745	62.5
Registered electors			46,007	
	National Liberal win (new boundaries)			
C indicates candidate endorsed by the coalition government.

=== Elections in the 1920s ===
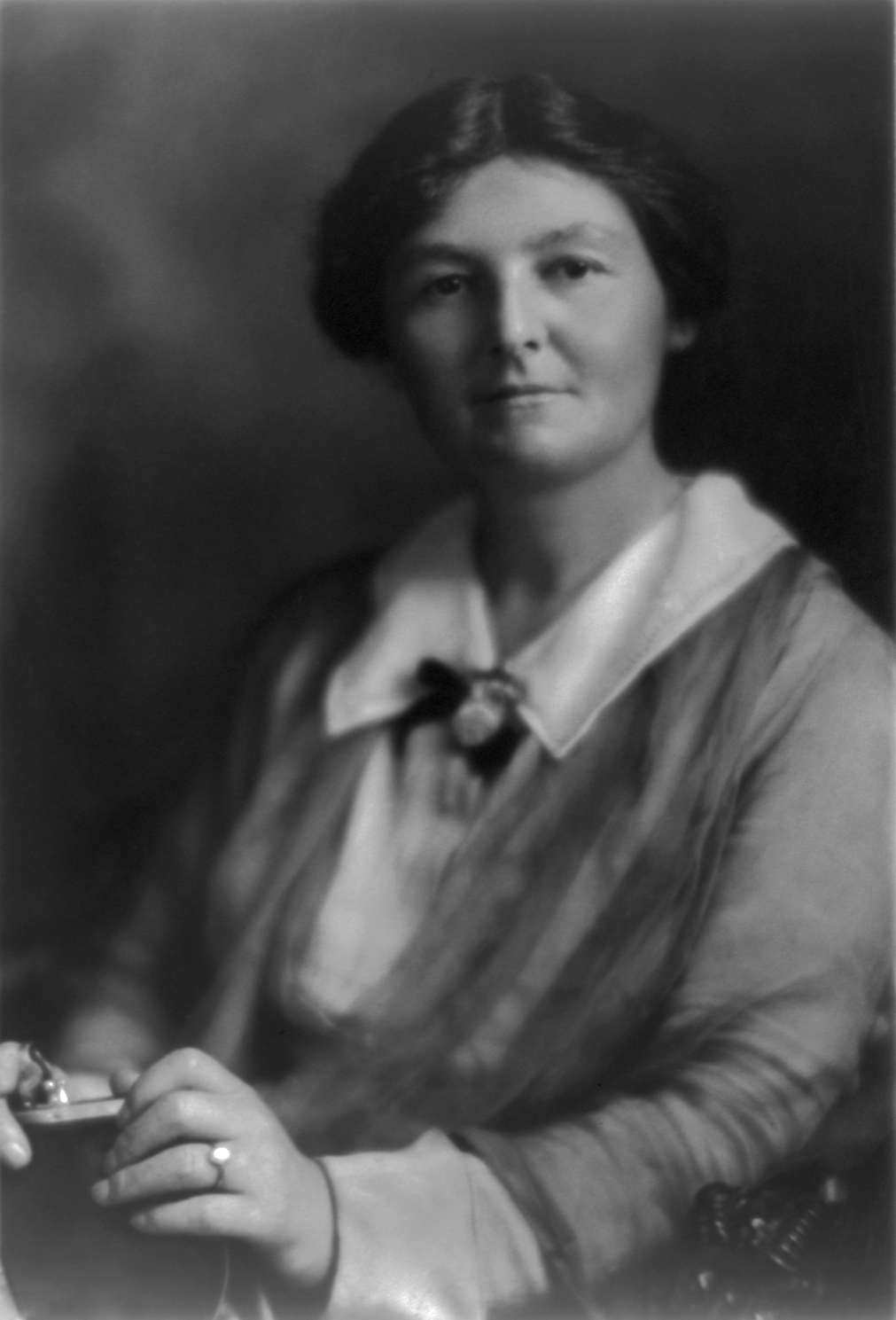
Bondfield

1920 Northampton by-election
Party		Candidate	Votes	%	±%
C	National Liberal	Charles McCurdy	16,650	55.6	−7.1
	Labour	Margaret Bondfield	13,279	44.4	+7.1
Majority			3,371	11.2	−14.2
Turnout			29,929	67.1	+4.6
Registered electors			44,573		
	National Liberal hold		Swing	−7.1	
C indicates candidate endorsed by the coalition government.

General election 1922: Northampton
Party	Candidate	Votes	%	±%
National Liberal	Charles McCurdy	19,974	52.3	−10.4
Labour	Margaret Bondfield	14,498	37.9	+0.6
Liberal	Henry Vivian	3,753	9.8	New
Majority		5,476	14.4	N/A
Turnout		38,225	85.5	+23.0
Registered electors		44,722		
National Liberal hold		Swing		

General election 1923: Northampton
Party	Candidate	Votes	%	±%
Labour	Margaret Bondfield	15,556	40.5	+2.6
Unionist	John Veasy Collier	11,520	30.0	New
Liberal	Charles McCurdy	11,342	29.5	–22.8
Majority		4,036	10.5	N/A
Turnout		38,418	84.3	−1.2
Registered electors		45,599		
Labour gain from Liberal		Swing		

General election 1924: Northampton
Party	Candidate	Votes	%	±%
Unionist	Arthur Holland	16,017	39.5	+9.5
Labour	Margaret Bondfield	15,046	37.2	−3.3
Liberal	James Manfield	9,436	23.3	−6.2
Majority		971	2.3	N/A
Turnout		40,499	87.0	+2.7
Registered electors		46,543		
Unionist gain from Labour		Swing	+6.4	

1928 Northampton by-election
Party	Candidate	Votes	%	±%
Labour	Cecil Malone	15,173	37.5	+0.3
Unionist	Alexander Renton	14,616	36.1	−3.4
Liberal	Sydney Morgan	9,584	23.7	+0.4
Ind. Unionist	E.A. Hailwood	1,093	2.7	New
Majority		557	1.4	N/A
Turnout		40,466	84.2	−2.8
Registered electors		48,048		
Labour gain from Unionist		Swing	+1.9	

General election 1929: Northampton
Party	Candidate	Votes	%	±%
Labour	Cecil Malone	22,356	41.7	+4.5
Unionist	Alexander Renton	20,177	37.7	−1.8
Liberal	Helen Schilizzi	11,054	20.6	−2.7
Majority		2,179	4.0	N/A
Turnout		53,587	87.5	+0.5
Registered electors		61,222		
Labour gain from Conservative		Swing	+3.2	

=== Elections in the 1930s ===
General election 1931: Northampton
Party	Candidate	Votes	%	±%
Conservative	Mervyn Manningham-Buller	34,817	63.6	+25.9
Labour	Cecil Malone	19,898	36.4	−5.3
Majority		14,919	27.2	N/A
Turnout		54,715	87.4	−0.1
Conservative gain from Labour		Swing		

General election 1935: Northampton
Party	Candidate	Votes	%	±%
Conservative	Mervyn Manningham-Buller	25,438	51.5	−12.1
Labour	Reginald Paget	23,983	48.5	+12.1
Majority		1,455	3.0	−24.2
Turnout		49,421	79.6	−7.8
Conservative hold		Swing		

General Election 1939–40

Another General Election was required to take place before the end of 1940. The political parties had been making preparations for an election to take place and by the Autumn of 1939, the following candidates had been selected;

- Conservative:
- Labour: Reginald Paget
- British Union: Norah Elam

=== Elections in the 1940s ===
1940 Northampton by-election
Party	Candidate	Votes	%	±%
Conservative	Spencer Summers	16,587	93.4	+41.9
Christian Pacifist	William Stanley Seamark	1,167	6.6	New
Majority		15,420	86.8	+83.8
Turnout		17,754	30.0	−49.6
Conservative hold		Swing		

General election 1945: Northampton
Party	Candidate	Votes	%	±%
Labour	Reginald Paget	27,681	56.36	+7.86
Conservative	Spencer Summers	20,684	42.11	−9.39
Independent Labour	James Edward Bugby	749	1.53	New
Majority		6,997	14.25	N/A
Turnout		49,114	75.52	−4.08
Registered electors		65,038		
Labour gain from Conservative		Swing	+8.63	

=== Elections in the 1950s ===
General election 1950: Northampton
Party	Candidate	Votes	%	±%
Labour	Reginald Paget	31,946	48.98	−7.38
Conservative	R.L. Agnew	24,664	37.81	−4.30
Liberal	Sydney Husbands Alloway	8,619	13.21	New
Majority		7,282	11.17	−3.08
Turnout		65,229	87.55	+12.03
Registered electors		74,502		
Labour hold		Swing	−1.54	

General election 1951: Northampton
Party	Candidate	Votes	%	±%
Labour	Reginald Paget	35,038	53.67	+4.69
Conservative	John Veasey Collier	30,244	46.33	+8.52
Majority		4,794	7.34	−3.83
Turnout		65,282	86.41	−1.14
Registered electors		75,551		
Labour hold		Swing	−1.92	

General election 1955: Northampton
Party	Candidate	Votes	%	±%
Labour	Reginald Paget	32,119	52.75	−0.92
Conservative	William Clark	28,771	47.25	+0.92
Majority		3,348	5.50	−1.84
Turnout		60,890	82.60	−3.81
Registered electors		73,713		
Labour hold		Swing	−0.92	

General election 1959: Northampton
Party	Candidate	Votes	%	±%
Labour	Reginald Paget	27,823	46.30	−6.45
Conservative	Jill Knight	25,106	41.77	−5.48
Liberal	Anthony Smith	7,170	11.93	New
Majority		2,717	4.53	−0.97
Turnout		60,099	82.87	+0.27
Registered electors		72,521		
Labour hold		Swing	−0.49	

=== Elections in the 1960s ===
General election 1964: Northampton
Party	Candidate	Votes	%	±%
Labour	Reginald Paget	28,568	49.04	+2.74
Conservative	Jill Knight	24,128	41.42	−0.35
Liberal	Irene Watson	5,557	9.54	−2.39
Majority		4,440	7.62	+3.09
Turnout		58,253	79.66	−3.21
Registered electors		73,129		
Labour hold		Swing	+1.55	

General election 1966: Northampton
Party	Candidate	Votes	%	±%
Labour	Reginald Paget	31,541	56.74	+7.70
Conservative	Oliver Wright	24,052	43.26	+1.84
Majority		7,489	13.48	+5.86
Turnout		55,593	76.38	−3.28
Registered electors		72,781		
Labour hold		Swing	+2.93	

=== Elections in the 1970s ===
General election 1970: Northampton
Party	Candidate	Votes	%	±%
Labour	Reginald Paget	27,424	51.16	−5.58
Conservative	Cecil Parkinson	26,183	48.84	+5.58
Majority		1,241	2.32	−11.16
Turnout		53,607	71.87	−4.51
Registered electors		74.590		
Labour hold		Swing	−5.58	

== Sources ==
- Robert Beatson, "A Chronological Register of Both Houses of Parliament" (London: Longman, Hurst, Res & Orme, 1807)
- D Brunton & D H Pennington, Members of the Long Parliament (London: George Allen & Unwin, 1954)
- Cobbett's Parliamentary history of England, from the Norman Conquest in 1066 to the year 1803 (London: Thomas Hansard, 1808)
- Leigh Rayment's Historical List of MPs – Constituencies beginning with "N" (part 2)

Parliament of the United Kingdom
Vacant since 1806 Title last held by Cambridge University	Constituency represented by the prime minister 1809–1812	Vacant until 1827 Title next held by Seaford
