= Spencer Summers =

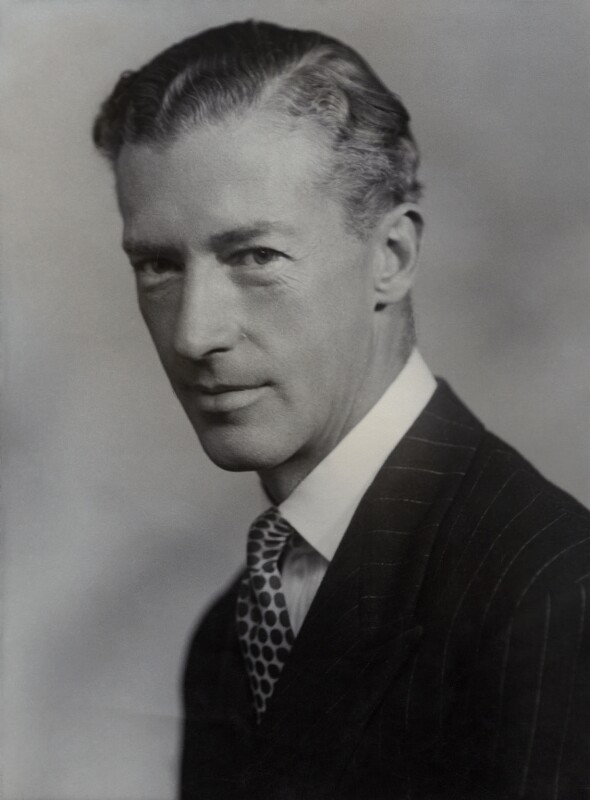
Summers

Sir Gerard Spencer Summers (27 October 1902 – 19 January 1976) was a British Conservative politician.

== Biography ==
Summers was born in Flintshire, Wales, in 1902, and educated at Wellington School and Trinity College, Cambridge. He became a director of the family business of John Summers & Sons, steelmakers.

During the Second World War (1940-1945) he was the elected Member of Parliament (MP) for Northampton and appointed the Director-General of Regional Organisation at the Ministry of Supply. In 1945, he was the Secretary for Overseas Trade in the post-war caretaker government.

In 1946 he also assumed the role of first chairman of the Outward Bound Trust. He was also a Governor of UWC Atlantic College from its opening in 1962–76, and was on the foundation committee for three years prior to its opening.

He was MP for Aylesbury from 1950 until his retirement in 1970. He was knighted in 1956 and selected High Sheriff of Northamptonshire for 1974–75.

== Personal life ==
Spencer Summers married Jean Pickering in London in 1930. Their son, Shane, was a racing driver who competed in a few non-Championship Formula One races, but was accidentally killed at the age of 24 when practicing for the 1961 Silver City Trophy at the Brands Hatch circuit in Kent. Sir Gerard Spencer Summers died near Banbury, Oxfordshire in 1976, aged 73.

Political offices
Preceded by Harcourt Johnstone	Secretary for Overseas Trade; 1945	Succeeded by Hilary Marquand
Parliament of the United Kingdom
Preceded by Sir Mervyn Manningham-Buller	Member of Parliament for Northampton; 1940–1945	Succeeded by Reginald Paget
Preceded by Sir Stanley Reed	Member of Parliament for Aylesbury; 1950–1970	Succeeded by Timothy Raison
Honorary titles
Preceded by Michael Berry	High Sheriff of Northamptonshire; 1974	Succeeded by Timothy Sergison-Brooke
