= Reginald Paget, Baron Paget of Northampton =

British politician

Reginald Thomas Guy Des Voeux Paget, Baron Paget of Northampton, QC (2 September 1908 – 2 January 1990), also known as Reginald Guy Thomas Du Voeux Paget, was a British lawyer and Labour politician.

== Career ==
The son of Major Guy Paget, he was educated at Eton and Trinity College, Cambridge, where he read law, but did not graduate. Paget joined the Labour Party whilst he was an undergraduate at Cambridge, a decision made striking by the fact that his family had produced five generations of Conservative and Liberal MPs. He was called to the bar in 1934.

He stood as the Labour candidate for Northampton in 1935, but was not elected. During World War II he served in the Royal Naval Volunteer Reserve (1940–43). After the war, he was advocate for Field Marshal Erich von Manstein during his trial for war crimes. He later wrote Manstein: His Campaigns and His Trial (1957). He took silk in 1947.

He stood again as the Labour candidate for Northampton in 1945, and won the seat. He was repeatedly re-elected until February 1974, when the constituency was abolished. From 1960 to 1964, Paget successively served as junior opposition spokesman for the Royal Navy and the Army. During his tenure in the House of Commons, he was an independent voice, playing a major role in the campaign to abolish capital punishment. He was a strong opponent of the execution of Derek Bentley and argued for Timothy Evans to be posthumously pardoned for the murder of his child (a crime widely believed to have been committed by John Christie).

Paget was an outspoken critic of Harold Wilson during the 1963 Labour Party leadership election, and remained just as firm a critic once Wilson became Prime Minister, at one point resigning the party whip after disagreeing with the Government's decision to sanction Ian Smith's white minority regime in Rhodesia following its unilateral declaration of independence from Britain (the whip was later restored). In 1968, during a speech given at the University of Nottingham, Paget called upon Wilson to resign, declaring: "Mr Wilson has reached the point at which nobody anywhere in the world believes a word he says." These attacks led him to be censured twice by his constituency party, although on both occasions he survived the threat of deselection.

Paget was initially supportive of British entry into the European Economic Community (EEC), and in 1954 became Secretary of the UK Council of the European Movement. However, in later years his views changed: in 1971 he was one of the majority of Labour MPs to vote against membership, and during the 1975 EEC referendum campaign he gave a speech in the House of Lords in which he stated that the EEC was impotent in the face of the Soviet threat; in the resulting vote a day later he was one of only 20 peers to vote against remaining in the EEC.

On 2 January 1975, he was created a life peer as Baron Paget of Northampton, of Lubenham in Leicestershire.

Paget was said to be the slowest speaker in the House of Commons and was master of the Pytchley Hunt from 1968 to 1971, an unusual position for a Labour MP.

== Family ==
In 1931, he married Sybil Helen Gibbons (Nancy), daughter of Sills Clifford Gibbons. They occupied Lubenham Lodge, two miles west of Market Harborough, from 1964. He later separated from his wife, and had a relationship with Diana Spearman, widow of the Conservative MP Sir Alexander Spearman.

== Arms ==
Coat of arms of Reginald Paget, Baron Paget of Northampton
Coronet A Coronet of a Baron Crest A Lion rampant Sable collared Or supporting an Antique Shield Argent charged with an Escallop Sable Escutcheon Arms: Sable a Cross engrailed between in the 1st and 4th quarters an Escallop Argent Motto Espere et Persevere

Parliament of the United Kingdom
Preceded by Sir Spencer Summers	Member of Parliament for Northampton; 1945 – February 1974	Constituency abolished
