= Cecil Malone =

British politician

Lieutenant-Colonel Cecil Malone
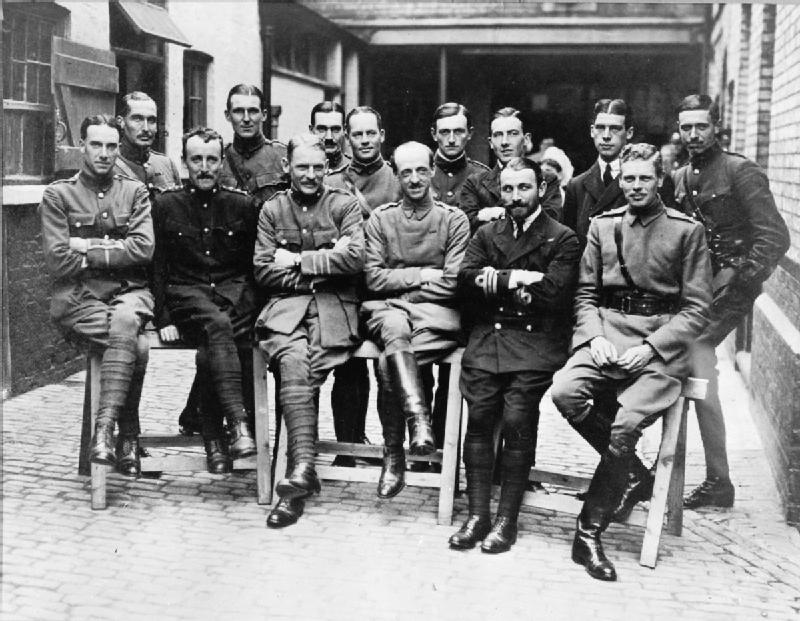
- Lt. Cecil Malone (rear row, 3rd from r.) with other pioneering officers of the RFC in 1913, including Charles Samson of the HMS Ben-my-Chree

Parliamentary Private Secretary to the Minister for Pensions
- In office 1931–1931
- Prime Minister: Ramsay MacDonald
- Minister: Frederick Roberts

Member of Parliament for Northampton
- In office 9 January 1928 – 7 October 1931
- Preceded by: Arthur Holland
- Succeeded by: Mervyn Manningham-Buller

Member of Parliament for Leyton East
- In office 14 December 1918 – 26 October 1922
- Preceded by: New constituency
- Succeeded by: Ernest Edward Alexander

Personal details
- Born: Cecil John L'Estrange Malone; 7 September 1890
- Died: 25 February 1965 (aged 74)
- Party: Liberal (until 1919); BSP (1919–20); CPGB (1920–22); Labour (from 1922)
- Spouse: Leah Kay (m. 1921; died 1951)

Military service
- Allegiance: United Kingdom
- Branch/service: Royal Navy; Royal Air Force
- Years of service: 1905–1919
- Rank: Lieutenant (RN); Lieutenant-Colonel (RAF)
- Commands: HMS Engadine; HMS Ben-my-Chree; East Indies and Egypt Seaplane Squadron
- Awards: Order of the Nile; Officer of the Order of the British Empire (revoked in 1921)

Cecil John L'Estrange Malone (7 September 1890 – 25 February 1965) was a British politician and pioneer naval aviator who served as the United Kingdom's first Communist member of parliament.

== Early years and military service ==
Malone was born in Dalton Holme, a parish in the East Riding of Yorkshire, on 7 September 1890. He was the son of the Reverend Savile L'Estrange Malone and Frances Mary Faljomb. His maternal grandmother Selina Jenkinson was a daughter of Charles Jenkinson, 3rd Earl of Liverpool. He was related to the sisters Constance Markievicz and Eva Gore-Booth.

Malone was educated at Cordwalles School in Maidenhead before joining the Royal Navy in 1905 and went through officer training at Royal Naval College, Dartmouth. On 15 March 1910, he was confirmed as a sub-lieutenant having previously been acting in that rank. In 1911, he was part of the second course approved by the Admiralty to attend Naval Flying School, Eastchurch. He was promoted to lieutenant from sub-lieutenant on 15 December 1911.

Malone earned his Royal Aero Club certificate (No. 195) on 12 March 1912. In the Army Manoeuvres of 1912, Malone flew a twin-engined triple-screwed Short biplane. He is also noted for flying off the forecastle of HMS London steaming 12 knots (22 km/h; 14 mph).

During the First World War, Malone commanded Royal Naval Air Service (RNAS) planes in the Cuxhaven Raid on 25 December 1914. From August 1914 to March 1915, he captained HMS Engadine, a cross-channel steamer converted to a seaplane carrier. From March 1915 to April 1916, he captained HMS Ben-my-Chree, another steamer converted to a seaplane carrier. Under Malone's command, seaplanes from Ben-my-Chree were the first on record to carry torpedoes and they torpedoed three enemy vessels in 1916. Malone then took over command of the East Indies and Egypt Seaplane Squadron, for which he was awarded the Fourth Class of the Order of the Nile.

Malone was appointed to the Plans Division of the Admiralty in 1918 before becoming the First British Air Attache at the Embassy of the United Kingdom, Paris. In this capacity, he was the Air Representative of the Supreme War Council in Versailles in 1918. He was awarded Officer of the Order of the British Empire (OBE) for his war efforts.

== Early political career ==
Malone was elected as the Coalition Liberal Member of Parliament (MP) for East Leyton at the 1918 general election. He was a member of the anti-communist Reconstruction Society and wrote a number of articles strongly criticising left-wing activists. As Adams and Wilson wrote, "his early career contained no hint of his subsequent espousal of the communist cause."

On 13 September 1919, with a passport endorsed by the British Foreign Office in hand, Cecil Malone embarked on the S.S. Arcturus for Helsinki. There Malone, who intended to visit Soviet Russia despite the blockade of the country, unexpectedly met up with another individual planning on crossing over to Petrograd. After travelling by sea and land to the border, the pair managed to cross the frontier through deserted forests and marshland by foot, arriving at the Soviet border on Sunday, 28 September. The two arrived in Petrograd by train at 6 pm the following day. Malone met and spoke with key leaders of the trade union movement in Petrograd before proceeding by train to Moscow.

In Moscow, Malone met with Maxim Litvinov, then a top official in the People's Commissariat of Foreign Affairs, with whom he had a long discussion. He later met for an hour with foreign minister Georgii Chicherin. Malone's new friends arranged for him to accompany Red Army leader Leon Trotsky on an inspection of troops at Tula aboard Trotsky's special train. Accompanying Malone on the trip were the head of the Supreme Council of National Economy (VSNKh), Alexei Rykov; chief of food supply for the Russian Republic, Alexander Tsiurupa; and People's Commissar of Education Anatoly Lunacharsky.

The British Socialist Party published the paperback edition of Malone's experiences in Soviet Russia early in 1920.

During his visit, detailed in his memoir, Malone toured factories and theatres, power stations and government offices. He found the mission of the Bolshevik government in attempting economic reconstruction to be compelling and emerged from his trip a committed communist. "The history of Allied negotiations and transactions with Russia appears to have been a chain of catastrophes and mistakes" he wrote:

"...[I]t seems there was a culpable lack of foresight in visualizing the forces behind the Revolution. Every effort was made by Lenin and Trotsky to bring about peace with the Allies. They were prepared to refuse to sign the Treaty of Brest-Litovsk with Germany, and instead to continue the fight on the side of the Allies, but the Allies refused to recognize them ... Various interventional operations, mostly carried out on the plea of protecting Russia against the invasion from Germany, were inaugurated, but really, as we now see, they were carried out in the interests of the capitalist class in Russia. It seems incredible that such slender excuses for intervention should have been allowed to hold good for so long.... [N]ow we find ourselves supporting partisan leaders in Russia by the supply of arms and munitions at the expense of the British taxpayer, and in addition we find our Government carrying on an inhuman and illegal blockade against the Russian people, the result of which during the coming winter months will indeed be terrible."

Upon his return to England, Malone became active in the Hands Off Russia campaign, and in November 1919 he officially joined the proto-Communist British Socialist Party (BSP). Malone was soon being elected to the party's leadership through the patronage of Theodore Rothstein. In the summer of 1920, the BSP became the main constituent of the Communist Party of Great Britain (CPGB), and as a result, Malone became the first CPGB MP. He attended the London Communist Unity Convention held 31 July and 1 August 1921, at which he was elected to the new party's governing Central Committee. Malone's sudden conversion to revolutionary politics brought more questions than answers, and its genuineness was questioned. John Maclean claimed that Malone was a counter-revolutionary sent to disrupt the workers' movement, and he refused to speak alongside Malone.

Official CPGB historian James Klugmann saw Malone as a leading figure in the party's first year of existence:

"In the first months of the Party's existence Col. Malone was very active not only in Parliament, but addressing mass meetings and rallies all over the country. Whatever his theoretical weaknesses, he was a man of passion, moved by the revolutionary tremors that were shaking the world, full of wrath and indignation against the powers that be, and after a fiery speech in the Albert Hall on November 7, 1920, he was charged with sedition under Regulation 42 of the Defense of the Realm Act ... [h]e was sentenced to six months in the Second Division."

The line which landed Malone in jail related to his argument that during a revolutionary crisis, excesses might occur resulting in the killing of some prominent members of the bourgeoisie. "What are a few Churchills or a few Curzons on lampposts compared to the massacre of thousands of human beings?", Malone asked his audience. Despite Malone's prosecution, the Communist Party did not disavow Malone's rhetorical flourish, going so far as to publish an official party pamphlet, entitled What are a Few Churchills? in January 1921. He was stripped of his OBE on 24 June 1921.

Malone came to the attention of Special Branch, whose role it was to combat "Bolshevik subversion". He was frequently mentioned in reports to the cabinet on Revolutionary Organisations in the United Kingdom. Malone worked to promote the affiliation of the CPGB to the Labour Party, which was under consideration as a tactical matter, urged by Lenin. Malone was particularly keen and stated "There are still a few differences between the Communist Party and the Labour Party. I am glad to realise, however, that this will soon be settled by affiliation".

== Later political and military career ==
Malone dissociated himself from the Communist Party of Great Britain and joined the Independent Labour Party, which was affiliated to the Labour Party, in 1922. He was the Labour candidate for Ashton-under-Lyne in the 1924 general election, but was unsuccessful.

From 1924 he became interested in the Far East and was involved in the Hands Off China campaign which was established in 1925. He visited both China and Japan in 1926, and developed a relation with Eugene Chen.

However, following the death of Arthur Holland in 1927, Malone was elected as MP for Northampton in the ensuing 1928 by-election. He was re-elected at the 1929 general election, and served in Ramsay MacDonald's government as the Parliamentary Private Secretary to the Minister of Pensions, Frederick Roberts, in 1931. He was not re-elected in the 1931 general election.

Malone returned to military service in the Second World War. In 1942 he was the staff officer to the chief warden of the City of Westminster Civil Defence. From 1943 to 1945 he served in the Admiralty Small Vessels Pool. Following the end of the war in 1945, he became the Vice President of the Royal Television Society, the founder and chairman of the Radio Association, and a fellow of the Royal Aeronautical Society. By the time of his death his publications included The Russian Republic, New China, and Manchukuo: Jewel of Asia.

== Later life ==
Malone married Leah Kay in 1921. After her death, he remarried in 1956. He died on 25 February 1965, aged 74.

Military offices
New title Ship chartered by the Royal Navy	Officer Commanding HMS Ben-my-Chree; 1915–1916	Succeeded by Charles Rumney Samson
Parliament of the United Kingdom
New constituency	Member of Parliament for Leyton East; 1918 – 1922	Succeeded by Ernest Edward Alexander
Preceded by Arthur Holland	Member of Parliament for Northampton; 1928 – 1931	Succeeded by Sir Mervyn Manningham-Buller
