= Tom Pursglove =

British politician (born 1988)

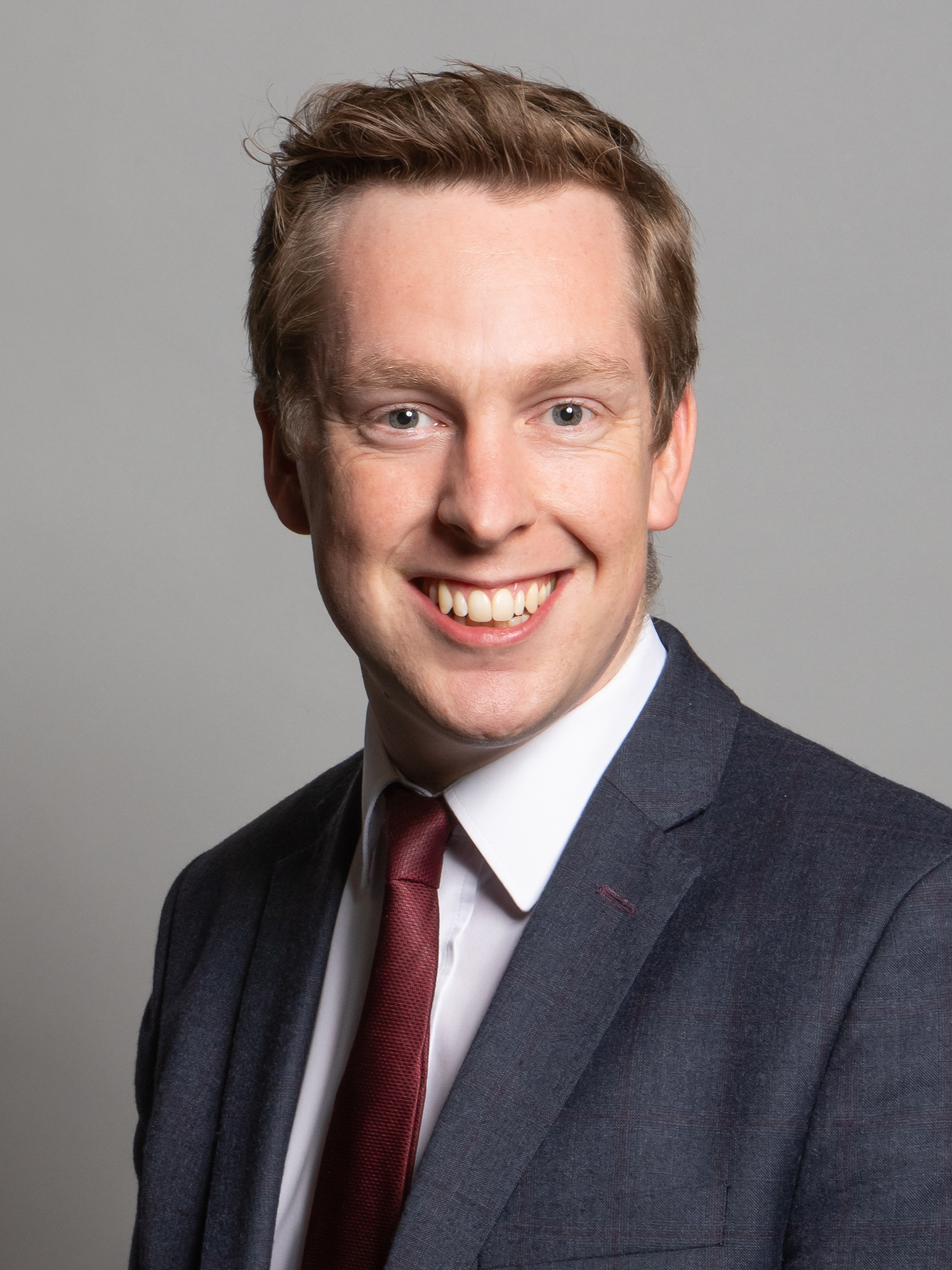
- Official portrait, 2020

Minister of State for Legal Migration and the Border (Note: As Minister of State for Immigration from September to October 2022.)
- In office 7 December 2023 – 5 July 2024
- Prime Minister: Rishi Sunak
- Preceded by: Robert Jenrick (Note: As Minister of State for Immigration.)
- Succeeded by: Seema Malhotra (Note: As Minister of State for Migration and Citizenship)
- In office 7 September 2022 – 25 October 2022
- Prime Minister: Liz Truss
- Preceded by: Kevin Foster
- Succeeded by: Robert Jenrick

Minister of State for Disabled People, Health and Work
- In office 28 October 2022 – 7 December 2023
- Prime Minister: Rishi Sunak
- Preceded by: Claire Coutinho
- Succeeded by: Mims Davies

Minister of State for Crime and Policing (Note: Jointly with the Ministry of justice.)
- In office 7 July 2022 – 7 September 2022
- Prime Minister: Boris Johnson
- Preceded by: Kit Malthouse
- Succeeded by: Jeremy Quin

Parliamentary Under-Secretary of State for Justice and Tackling Illegal Migration (Note: Jointly with the Home Office.)
- In office 17 September 2021 – 7 July 2022
- Prime Minister: Boris Johnson
- Preceded by: Chris Philp
- Succeeded by: Simon Baynes

Vice Chairman of the Conservative Party for Youth
- In office 27 July 2018 – 15 January 2019
- Chairman: Brandon Lewis
- Preceded by: Ben Bradley
- Succeeded by: Nigel Huddleston

Member of Parliament for Corby
- In office 7 May 2015 – 30 May 2024
- Preceded by: Andy Sawford
- Succeeded by: Lee Barron

Personal details
- Born: Thomas Christopher John Pursglove; 5 November 1988 (age 37) Kettering, England
- Party: Conservative
- Education: Sir Christopher Hatton School
- Alma mater: Queen Mary University of London

Thomas Christopher John Pursglove (born 5 November 1988) is a British politician. A member of the Conservative Party, he served as a minister from September 2021 to July 2024 and was the Member of Parliament (MP) for Corby from May 2015 until 2024, when he was defeated.

Pursglove has previously served as Minister of State for Disabled People, Health and Work, Minister of State for Immigration, and Minister of State for Crime and Policing. Aged 26 at the time of his election, he was the youngest Conservative MP of the 2015–2017 Parliament.

== Early life and career ==
Pursglove was born in Kettering on 5 November 1988, and grew up in Wellingborough. He was educated at Sir Christopher Hatton School, a state comprehensive school in Wellingborough, and graduated from Queen Mary University of London in 2010 with a politics degree.

In 2007, at the age of 18, Pursglove became the youngest councillor in the country when he was elected for Croyland Ward on Wellingborough Borough Council. The election saw the Conservative Party extend their dominance in Wellingborough, winning 30 of the 36 posts available. Pursglove was re-elected in 2011, but did not stand again in 2015.

In addition to his role as a councillor, Pursglove worked as a parliamentary assistant to the Conservative MP for Daventry Chris Heaton-Harris and worked with the Conservative MP for Wellingborough Peter Bone. Prior to being elected as an MP, Pursglove was deputy chairman of the Wellingborough Conservative Association.

== Parliamentary career ==
Pursglove was elected as MP for Corby at the 2015 general election with 42.8% of the vote and a majority of 2,412. He won back for the Conservatives a seat that had been lost to Labour in a 2012 by-election after the former Conservative MP Louise Mensch stood down.

In July 2016, following Theresa May's appointment as Prime Minister, Pursglove was appointed as parliamentary private secretary to Robert Goodwill, the Minister of State for Immigration at the Home Office.

Pursglove was re-elected at the 2017 general election with an increased vote share of 49.2% and an increased majority of 2,690 votes.

In February 2018, following the announcement that Northamptonshire County Council had brought in a section 114 notice, putting it in special measures following a crisis in its finances, Pursglove was one of seven local MPs who released a statement arguing that the problems with the authority were down to mismanagement from the Conservative councillors who led it rather than funding cuts from the Conservative Government. They further argued that government commissioners should take over the running of the council.

On 27 July 2018, following Ben Bradley's resignation over disagreements with the government's policy on Brexit, Pursglove was selected to replace him as Vice Chairman of the Conservative Party for Youth. In February 2019, fellow Conservative MP Nigel Huddleston replaced Pursglove in the role following his resignation over the approach of the party towards Brexit.

In August 2019, Pursglove was appointed as an assistant government whip in the first Johnson ministry.

Pursglove was re-elected at the 2019 general election with an increased vote share of 55.2% and an increased majority of 10,268 votes.

In September 2021, he was appointed Parliamentary Under-Secretary of State for Immigration, Compliance and Courts during the cabinet reshuffle, a role held jointly between the Home Office and Ministry of Justice.

In October 2022, following the resignation of Liz Truss as Prime Minister, Pursglove announced that he would be supporting previous Prime Minister Boris Johnson in the subsequent leadership election.

In October 2023, Pursglove was reported to have been campaigning with Peter Bone, who had been suspended from the House of Commons and had had the Conservative whip suspended. Following criticism by the Labour Party about this, the Prime Minister's spokesman said that Rishi Sunak had confidence in Pursglove. In the general election of 2024 he was defeated by the Labour party candidate.

== Political views ==
=== Criticism of the European Union ===
Pursglove was one of the founders of Grassroots Out, an organisation which advocated United Kingdom withdrawal from the European Union. The organisation was led by politicians from a range of political parties, including fellow Conservative MP Peter Bone and Labour MP Kate Hoey. In February 2016 it was announced that Pursglove and fellow Conservative MP Peter Bone would be speakers at the UKIP Spring Conference. Although rare for representatives of rival political parties to appear at such events, they argued any role they had there would be as representatives of the Grassroots Out group.

In April 2016, Pursglove was criticised for taking payments of £21,750 from the Grassroots Out campaign, of which he was chief executive, which some fellow campaigners argued should have been donated to further campaigning. However, he argued his work had "keep costs to a minimum, allowing us to spend the maximum amount on campaigning", rather than hiring outside expertise. In May 2016, he stated that, given the choice, he would ultimately prefer to see Britain leave the EU than his party secure another majority at the next general election, but also said that he was a 'loyal Conservative' and had no desire to defect to UKIP.

=== The environment ===
In 2015, Pursglove expressed scepticism about human influence on climate change and advocated abolishing the Department of Energy and Climate Change. Also in 2015, Pursglove questioned public spending on reducing carbon emissions in the UK on the grounds that countries such as China produce more emissions and therefore needed to take more action.

== Post-parliamentary career ==
Following his defeat at the 2024 general election, Pursglove co-founded, and has worked as a Director, at public affairs consultancy Ascalane Partners.

== Notes ==
Parliament of the United Kingdom
Preceded by Andy Sawford	Member of Parliament for Corby; 2015–2024	Succeeded by Lee Barron
