= Sawford =

Sawford is a surname. Notable people with the surname include:

- Andy Sawford (born 1976), British politician
- Phil Sawford (born 1950), British politician
- Rod Sawford (born 1944), Australian politician
