= 2012 Corby by-election =

2012 UK Parliamentary by-election

- 15 November 2012

Corby constituency
- Turnout: 44.8% (▼24.4 pp)
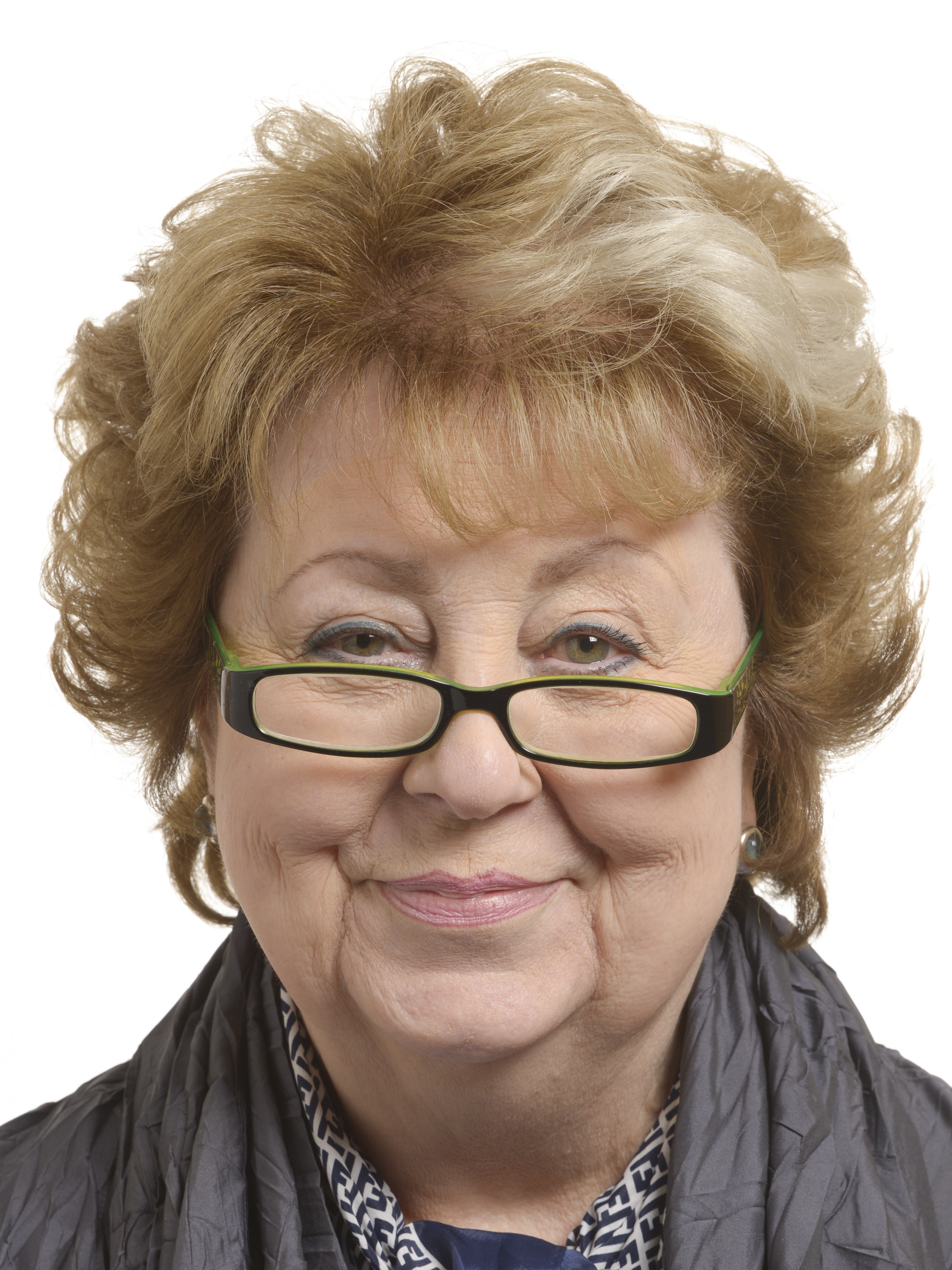
| | Lab | Con |
| Candidate | Andy Sawford | Christine Emmett | Margot Parker |
| Party | Labour | Conservative | UKIP |
| Popular vote | 17,267 | 9,476 | 5,108 |
| Percentage | 48.4% | 26.6% | 14.3% |
| Swing | ▲9.8 pp | ▼15.6 pp | New party |
MP before election
Louise Mensch
Conservative
Elected MP
Andy Sawford
Labour

A by-election for the United Kingdom parliamentary constituency of Corby was held on 15 November 2012, triggered by the resignation of incumbent Conservative Party MP Louise Mensch. It was won by Andy Sawford of the Labour Party, gaining the seat from the Conservatives.

The Conservatives' and Liberal Democrats' vote dropped significantly and UKIP came third with their highest-ever vote in a parliamentary by-election to that date.

The election was held on the same day as by-elections in Cardiff South and Penarth and Manchester Central, and the inaugural Police and Crime Commissioner elections.

== Background ==
Formed in 1983, the Corby constituency had been held by the Labour Party since 1997, but was gained by the Conservative candidate, author Louise Mensch (née Bagshawe), at the 2010 general election. In an email to the Prime Minister David Cameron on 6 August 2012, Mensch confirmed her intention to move to New York City to spend time with her new husband, Peter Mensch, whose work is there, and their family. Louise Mensch was appointed Steward and Bailiff of the Manor of Northstead, thereby resigning her seat in the House of Commons, on 29 August 2012.

All registered Parliamentary electors (i.e. British, Irish and Commonwealth citizens living in the UK and British citizens living overseas) who were aged 18 or over on 15 November 2012 and were on the electoral register for the constituency, were entitled to vote in the by-election. The deadline for voters to register to vote in the by-election was midnight on Wednesday 31 October 2012. (Note: The deadline for the receipt of electoral registration applications is the eleventh working day before election day.) However, those who qualified as an anonymous elector had until midnight on Thursday 8 November 2012 to register to vote. (Note: The deadline for the receipt and determination of anonymous electoral registration applications is the same as the publication date of the notice of alteration to the Electoral Register, i.e. the fifth working day before election day.)

== Election campaign ==
Ed Miliband launched the Labour campaign in the East Northamptonshire town of Thrapston rather than the traditional Labour stronghold of Corby.

In an interview with the Northamptonshire Telegraph at the campaign launch in Corby, UK Independence Party leader Nigel Farage said: "We intend to put together a serious campaign here."

A poll conducted 12–18 October by Lord Ashcroft in the constituency found 54% for Labour, 32% for the Conservatives, 10% for the Liberal Democrats and 8% for other candidates.

James Delingpole, a Daily Telegraph journalist who denies anthropogenic global warming, stated his intention to run as an independent, on a platform opposing wind farms. Delingpole stated this ambition on 17 September 2012 and met with prospective local voters. However, he never formally applied, pulling out after support from the Conservative energy minister, John Hayes, opposing onshore wind farms, which caused a minor rift between Conservative and Liberal Democrat ministers. Chris Heaton-Harris, (Con, Daventry) and campaign manager for the party at the by-election, was secretly filmed saying he had encouraged Delingpole to run as a "plan" whereby Delingpole would say he would stand, though he would never actually do so, in order to "cause some hassle" and thus promote opposition to wind farms. Lewes councillor, Donna Edmonds (Con) set up Delingpole's wind-farm campaign website. Both Heaton-Harris and Edmonds argued they had not broken any party rules on supporting an opposition candidate on the grounds that Delingpole never formally became a candidate. The news of the secret footage broke before the election in the national press.

== Result ==
The total ballots issued were 35,775, and there were 110 spoilt ballots. The result was the second largest numerical majority ever in the Corby constituency (for any party) since its creation in 1983 (only 1997 was higher). In percentage terms, the Labour majority is only slightly lower than that in 1997 (21.8% compared to 22.0%). The result also represented the highest ever vote and share for UKIP at a parliamentary by-election at the time (the highest share record was broken at Rotherham two weeks later, and the record for largest number of UKIP votes polled in a by-election was broken at Eastleigh in February 2013). Corby was also the fourth by-election (out of nine in Great Britain up to that time) of the 2010 parliament at which the Liberal Democrats lost their deposit.

This was the first seat gained by Labour in a by-election since the 1997 Wirral South by-election, and was the last by-election which resulted in a Labour gain until the 2022 Wakefield by-election.

A recount delayed the declaration of the result, called by the agent of the Liberal Democrat candidate, Jill Hope, who came 13 votes short of holding her deposit.

2012 Corby by-election
| Party | Candidate | Votes | % | ±% |
|---|---|---|---|---|
| Labour | Andy Sawford | 17,267 | 48.4 | +9.8 |
| Conservative | Christine Emmett | 9,476 | 26.6 | −15.6 |
| UKIP | Margot Parker | 5,108 | 14.3 | N/A |
| Liberal Democrats | Jill Hope | 1,770 | 5.0 | −9.5 |
| BNP | Gordon Riddell | 614 | 1.7 | −3.0 |
| English Democrat | David Wickham | 432 | 1.2 | N/A |
| Green | Jonathan Hornett | 378 | 1.1 | N/A |
| Independent | Ian Gillman | 212 | 0.6 | N/A |
| Cannabis Law Reform | Peter Reynolds | 137 | 0.4 | N/A |
| Church of the Militant Elvis | David Bishop | 99 | 0.3 | N/A |
| Independent | Mr Mozzarella | 73 | 0.2 | N/A |
| Young People's | Rohen Kapur | 39 | 0.1 | N/A |
| Democracy 2015 | Adam Lotun | 35 | 0.1 | N/A |
| United People's Party | Christopher Scotton | 25 | 0.1 | N/A |
| Turnout | | 35,665 | 44.8 | −24.4 |
| Majority | | 7,791 | 21.8 | |
| Labour gain from Conservative | | Swing | +12.7 | |

- The Labour Party candidate Andy Sawford was chosen in 2011. He was the chief executive of the Local Government Information Unit at the time and is the son of the former Kettering MP Phil Sawford. Sawford said he is a "Northamptonshire lad" who can trace his roots "at least eight generations".
- On 1 September 2012, the Conservative Party confirmed the choice of the Rutland County Councillor Christine Emmett as their defending candidate. Emmett was a member of William Hague's "Northern Transport Commission" and has been involved in NHS and transport infrastructure projects. She believes that it is important for people to "train for the jobs we have".
- The UK Independence Party (UKIP) candidate was Margot Parker, who stood for Libertas in the 2009 European Parliament elections in the East Midlands. She stood against the "government's need to micro-manage every aspect" of people's lives.
- Jill Hope, the Liberal Democrat candidate, said she was standing to deal with unemployment in the constituency as "here the issue is isolation and lack of access to work".
- Gordon Riddell, candidate of the far-right British National Party, stood on a platform of finding jobs and housing for local people.
- On 30 August 2012, David Wickham was confirmed as the English Democrats' candidate through an affiliated blog. Wickham wanted to reverse the decline in manufacturing and called for the establishment an English parliament, an end to mass uncontrolled immigration and the departure of the UK from the EU.
- On 6 October, the Green Party announced that Jonathan Hornett had been selected as its candidate following a ballot of local members. He stated, "The Green Party is the only alternative to cuts, climate change and social injustice. Locally we want more wind farms and public services; and no more housing developments, roads, warehouses or nuclear waste."
- Independent candidate Ian Gillman had stood as the UK Independence Party candidate in Corby at the 2001 general election.
- It was announced on 3 September that Peter Reynolds, leader of Cannabis Law Reform (formerly the Legal Cannabis Alliance) would stand as a candidate. He argues that the cannabis issue shows how the main parties "refuse to listen to public opinion".
- David Bishop stood as candidate for the Elvis Loves Pets party, the latest incarnation of the satirical Church of the Militant Elvis Party.
- 'Mr Mozzarella' was a character appearing in advertisements for Just Eat, an online food order and delivery brand, who set up the 'Don't Cook Party'. The head of brand marketing for Just Eat, Richard Murfitt, was the election agent for Mozzarella.
- On 2 September, the Young People's Party announced that they would stand Dr Rohen Kapur, previously an independent candidate in the Hornsey and Wood Green seat in the 2010 general election. Dr Kapur would abolish income tax and VAT.
- On 30 August, it was announced that Adam Lotun was to stand as an independent candidate with the backing of Democracy 2015. Lotun stood on a platform of a living wage and renationalisation of public transport. The party was first publicly mooted on 4 September 2012, and this was the first election in which it was involved.
- Christopher Scotton, East Midlands organiser, was confirmed as the candidate for the newly formed United People's Party. He describes the UPP as "non-xenophobic" which promotes international co-operation.

== Previous result ==
General election 2010: Corby
| Party | Candidate | Votes | % | ±% |
|---|---|---|---|---|
| Conservative | Louise Bagshawe | 22,886 | 42.2 | +2.3 |
| Labour Co-op | Phil Hope | 20,991 | 38.6 | −4.5 |
| Liberal Democrats | Portia Wilson | 7,834 | 14.5 | +1.7 |
| BNP | Roy Davies | 2,525 | 4.7 | New |
| Majority | | 1,895 | 3.5 | N/A |
| Turnout | | 54,180 | 69.2 | +3.6 |
| Conservative gain from Labour Co-op | | Swing | +3.4 | |

== See also ==
- List of United Kingdom by-elections (2010–present)
- Opinion polling for the 2015 United Kingdom general election
