= Andy Sawford =

British Labour Co-op politician

Shadow Minister for Communities and Local Government
- In office 7 October 2013 – 8 May 2015
- Leader: Ed Miliband
- Preceded by: Helen Jones
- Succeeded by: Steve Reed

Member of Parliament for Corby
- In office 15 November 2012 – 30 March 2015
- Preceded by: Louise Mensch
- Succeeded by: Tom Pursglove

Personal details
- Born: 15 March 1976 (age 50) Desborough, Northamptonshire
- Party: Labour and Co-operative
- Parent: Phil Sawford (father)
- Education: Durham University

Andrew Sawford (born 15 March 1976) is a British politician who served as Member of Parliament (MP) for Corby from 2012 to 2015. A member of the Labour and Co-operative parties, he was a Shadow Minister for Communities and Local Government from 2013 to 2015.

== Early life and career ==
Sawford was born in Desborough, Northamptonshire on 15 March 1976 to Phil and Rosemary Sawford. He was educated at a comprehensive school. He went on to study history at Durham University and graduated in 1997.

Following university, Sawford worked in Parliament for the then-Corby MP Phil Hope. He was a councillor and Cabinet Member on Dartford Borough Council in Kent from 1999 to 2003 representing Littlebrook Ward. Sawford also worked for the Local Government Association (LGA).

From 2003 to 2007, Sawford was director of Connect Public Affairs advising local authorities and organisations such as the National Association of Local Councils (NALC) and the Association of Police Authorities (APA). He was from 2008 to 2012 chief executive of the Local Government Information Unit (LGiU), a London-based thinktank and registered charity.

== Parliamentary career ==
In October 2011, Sawford was selected to contest the marginal Corby constituency for Labour at the next general election. Following the resignation of incumbent Conservative Louise Mensch in 2012, he won Corby at the subsequent by-election which became the first Labour by-election gain since 1997.

Sawford sat on the Communities and Local Government Committee from 2012 to 2013. He was appointed as a Shadow Minister for Communities and Local Government, responsible for local government, in October 2013.

He proposed a bill under the Ten Minute Rule that would allow the public sector to bid against private sector providers for control over rail franchises. Sawford also proposed a Private Member's Bill on zero hours contracts.

Sawford was defeated by Conservative Tom Pursglove at the 2015 general election, who won with a similar vote margin to Mensch's result in 2010.

== Post-parliamentary career ==
After Parliament, Sawford became chief executive of Connect Communications, and later led a management buy-out to take ownership of the business. In June 2019 it was announced that Connect had acquired Stratagem, a Belfast-based public affairs agency. He also serves on the board of the Public Relations and Communications Association, and is a governor of the Kettering Buccleuch Academy.

== Personal life ==
His father, Phil Sawford, served as Labour MP for Kettering, a neighbouring constituency to Corby, from 1997 to 2005.

Parliament of the United Kingdom
Preceded by Louise Mensch	Member of Parliament for Corby; 2012–2015	Succeeded by Tom Pursglove
