= 1940 Kettering by-election =

UK parliamentary by-election

The 1940 Kettering by-election was a parliamentary by-election held on 6 March 1940 for the British House of Commons constituency of Kettering in Northamptonshire.

== Previous MP ==
The seat had become vacant when the constituency's Conservative Member of Parliament (MP), John Eastwood, resigned his seat following his appointment as a Metropolitan Police magistrate. He had been Kettering's MP since the 1931 general election, when he defeated the sitting Labour MP Samuel Perry. The result at the 1935 general election had been close: Mr J. F. Eastwood (C.), 22,885; Mr J. R. Sadler (Lab and Co-op), 21,042; Conservative majority 1,843.

== Candidates ==
The Conservative candidate was John Profumo, a British Army officer and son of a prominent barrister of Italian origin. He was described by the Market Harborough Advertiser and Midland Mail as follows:

Now serving as a Lieutenant in the Northants Yeomanry, Mr. Profumo was educated at Harrow and Oxford, securing a degree in agricultural and political economy, and distinguished himself at sport. He decided while at college to make politics his career, and to complete his education he took a world trip alone. Afterwards he started political work in the East Fulham Conservative Association, of which he became chairman, and on several occasions, he visited Geneva for meetings of the League of Nations and an international labour conference. An air pilot, Mr. Profumo toured several European countries by plane in 1938 to make a study of the economic conditions. He is the elder son of Baron Albert Profurno. K.C., of Avon Dassett. Warwickshire.

According to the terms of the Second World War electoral truce, the Labour party declined to contest the election. However, William Ross, a local steelworker and Labour Party councillor in Corby contested the seat. He was disowned by his local Labour Party and by the party's National Executive Committee, and stood as a "Workers' and Pensioners' Anti-War" candidate.

The Market Harborough Advertiser and Midland Mail reported that Ross was a member of the Corby Food Control Committee. Never once had Coun. Ross given a trace of his attitude towards the war in his speeches at Urban Council meetings, however he was one of the principal councillors to urge for the speedy erection of public air-raid shelters In the town.

Councillor Ross had been returned as a Labour member of Corby's new Urban Council at the first elections in March 1939. His candidacy was supported by several other Labour councillors: GB Smith [county councillor], Thomas Frederick de la Court, and G. L. Caldwell, the latter serving as his election agent. He was also supported by Mr James Taylor Cole, President of Kettering Pensioners’ Parliament.

Ross came down to Corby from Glasgow three years earlier to take up employment at the steel works of Stewarts and Lloyds. He was 38 years old, a married man with two daughters, and he lived in one of Stewarts and Lloyds estate houses.

== Result ==
On a turnout barely half of that at the 1935 general election, Profumo held the seat comfortably, with 73% of the votes cast. At just 25 years old, he was the 'baby' of the House.

After the declaration, Profumo said: “I am delighted with the result. The electorate of the Kettering Division have demonstrated their loyalty and determination to bring the war to a speedy and just conclusion.”

Ross said: “The substantial number of votes cast for me is an indication of the growing opposition of the people to the National Government and the war.”

After the election, Ross and his election agent and fellow councillor G. L. Caldwell were both sacked by Stewarts and Lloyds for taking time off without notice to campaign. They were not initially provided with their insurance cards, according to the customary procedure when employees were discharged. In the Autumn of 1940, Ross joined the Communist Party, and moved to Birmingham to become its district organiser. It seems that Ross had joined the communist party when he was a Lanarkshire coal miner in Lanarkshire in 1926, and 'was urged to work within the Labour Party he found established in Kettering […] before resuming open communist party membership’.

Profumo had a successful career in the army (where he rose to the rank of Brigadier and was awarded an OBE), He was defeated at Kettering in the 1945 general election. He returned to Parliament in 1950, and rose to become Secretary of State for War in 1960, before his career was destroyed in 1963 by a political scandal which became known as the Profumo affair.

Kettering by-election, 6th March 1940
| Party | Candidate | Votes | % | ±% |
|---|---|---|---|---|
| Conservative | John Profumo | 17,914 | 73.0 | +20.9 |
| Workers' and Pensioners' Anti-War | William Ross | 6,616 | 27.0 | New |
| Majority | | 11,298 | 46.0 | +41.8 |
| Turnout | | 24,530 | 37.8 | −39.5 |
| Conservative hold | | Swing | | |

== See also ==
- Kettering constituency
- Kettering
- Lists of United Kingdom by-elections
- United Kingdom by-election records
