= William Homewood =

British politician

William Dennis Homewood

Member of Parliament
- In office 3 May 1979 – 13 May 1983
- Preceded by: Geoffrey de Freitas
- Succeeded by: Roger Freeman
- Constituency: Kettering

Personal details
- Born: 17 March 1920
- Died: 13 January 1989 (aged 68) Market Harborough
- Party: Labour
- Occupation: Politician

William Dennis Homewood (17 March 1920 – 13 January 1989) was a British Labour Party politician.

Homewood was Member of Parliament for Kettering from 1979 to 1983. After the boundary changes of that year, he stood in Corby, but lost to the Conservative candidate William Powell. He died in Market Harborough in 1989, at the age of 68.

Parliament of the United Kingdom
Preceded by Geoffrey de Freitas	Member of Parliament for Kettering; 1979–1983	Succeeded by Roger Freeman
