= Phil Sawford =

British Labour politician

Member of Parliament for Kettering
- In office 1 May 1997 – 11 April 2005
- Preceded by: Roger Freeman
- Succeeded by: Philip Hollobone

Personal details
- Born: Philip Andrew Sawford; 26 June 1950 (age 75) Loddington, Northamptonshire
- Party: Labour
- Other political affiliations: Socialist Campaign Group (1997–2005)
- Spouse: Rosemary Stokes (m. 1971)
- Children: 2, including Andy
- Education: Loddington CE Primary School; Kettering Grammar School
- Alma mater: Ruskin College, Oxford; University of Leicester

Philip Andrew Sawford (born 26 June 1950) is a British politician who served as Member of Parliament (MP) for Kettering from 1997 to 2005. A member of the Labour Party, he was Leader of Kettering Borough Council from 1991 to 1997.

== Early life and career ==
Sawford was born in Loddington, a small Northamptonshire village west of Kettering, on 26 June 1950. He was educated at Loddington Church of England Primary School and Kettering Grammar School. Sawford became an apprentice carpenter, and worked as a steelworker from 1977 until the closures and mass redundancies at Corby Steelworks in 1980.

He gained a Diploma at Ruskin College, Oxford in 1982, and later gained a BA degree from the University of Leicester in 1985. Sawford forged a career in training and personnel development, working for a training partnership in Wellingborough from 1985 to 1997.

== Local government career ==
Sawford was first elected to public office as a Member of Desborough Town Council in 1977 and became Chair in 1984. He went on to represent Loatland ward on Kettering Borough Council from 1980. Sawford was elected leader of the borough council following the 1991 local elections, when Labour became the largest party. He continued to serve in the role when they won an overall majority in 1995, but stood down from the Borough and Town councils after his election to Parliament in 1997.

Sawford returned to elected office as a Member of Desborough Town Council in 2018, and became Chair once again in 2021.

== Parliamentary career ==
Sawford stood as the Labour candidate for Wellingborough at the 1992 general election, but lost to the Conservative incumbent Peter Fry despite a swing towards Labour.

He unexpectedly won the Kettering constituency at the 1997 general election, defeating Conservative Cabinet minister Roger Freeman. Sawford won with a majority of 189 after three recounts, which meant the election result was one of the last to declare. He narrowly increased his majority to 665 at the 2001 general election. He was a member of the Environmental Audit Committee from 2000 to 2001 and the Environment, Food and Rural Affairs Committee from 2001 to 2003.

Sawford is considered to be on the left of the Labour Party and was a member of the Socialist Campaign Group whilst an MP. He was a sworn republican, an outspoken campaigner for the abolition of hunting, and an opponent of the invasion of Iraq in 2003. He frequently rebelled against the New Labour government.

Sawford was defeated by Conservative Philip Hollobone at the 2005 election, in line with the national swing against Labour. In 2007, he was re-selected to contest Kettering for Labour at the next general election. Constituency boundary changes implemented at the 2010 general election gave the seat a notional Labour majority, but Sawford was again defeated by Hollobone with an increased majority of almost 20 percentage points.

== Personal life ==
He married Rosemary Stokes on 1 May 1971, with whom he had sons Andy and Lee. Andy served as Labour MP for Corby, a neighbouring constituency to Kettering, from a by-election in 2012 until 2015.

Parliament of the United Kingdom
Preceded by Roger Freeman	Member of Parliament for Kettering; 1997–2005	Succeeded by Philip Hollobone
