= Owen Parker =

British industrialist (1860–1936)

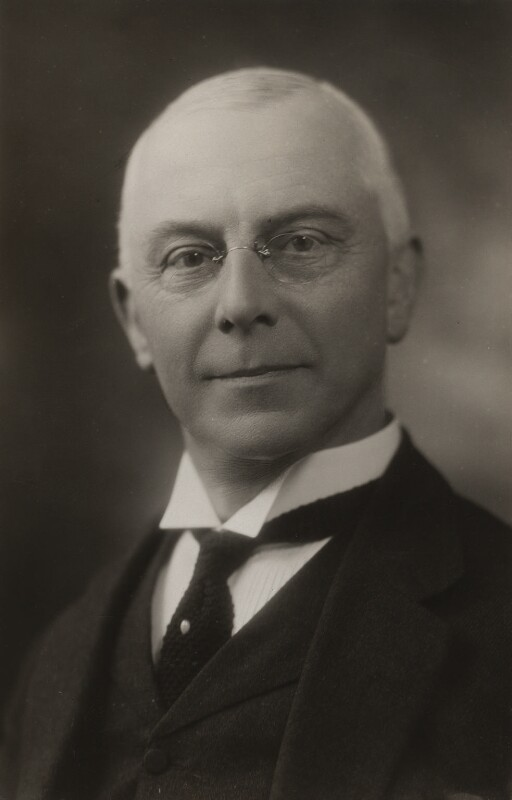
Parker in 1923

Owen Parker (1860 – 5 November 1936) was a British industrialist, who served as Conservative MP for Kettering in 1922–23.

Parker was born in Higham Ferrers, Northamptonshire, the son of Charles Parker, a boot and shoe manufacturer in the town. He was educated at the Chichele Grammar School in Higham Ferrers, then worked as a clerk in the London & North-Western Railway to gain business experience. He joined his father's business in 1879, became a partner in the factory in 1890, aged 30, and took over as sole proprietor on his father's death in 1899.

In 1897, he was elected to Higham Ferrers Town Council, and served as Mayor on eight occasions before retiring in 1919. He served on the local school board for twelve years, and as a justice of the peace from 1902 onwards.

He was elected President of the Incorporated Federated Associations of Boot and Shoe Manufacturers of Great Britain and Ireland in 1913, and in this capacity was an advisor to the government during the First World War, helping coordinate the industry to cope with the heavy demands of wartime production. He also chaired the committee overseeing the Derby Scheme for recruitment in the Midlands, and sat on the conscription appeals tribunal.

He stood for Parliament in the 1922 general election as a Conservative candidate for Kettering. He won it by a small margin over Alfred Waterson, the Labour and Co-Operative incumbent, but was defeated at the 1923 general election, when Samuel Perry retook the seat for Labour. He did not stand for election in 1924.

He continued in public service through the 1920s and 1930s, sitting on a wide range of public bodies, as a magistrate, and as a member of Northamptonshire County Council. However, his firm went into liquidation in 1933, following a loss of trade. Parker took heavy personal losses and his health suffered; he died aged 76 at his home in Higham Ferrers in November 1936. His funeral was a major public event, with a procession through the town and three lorries of wreaths. He left an estate of £3,000.

== Sources ==
- Craig, F.W.S., ed. (1969) British parliamentary election results 1918-1949 Glasgow: Political Reference Publications. p. 437. ISBN 0-900178-01-9.
- Whitaker's Almanack 1923 and 1924 editions
- Owen Parker - Members of Parliament after 1832
