= Ian Morrow =

Ian Morrow in 1963

Sir Ian Thomas Morrow (8 June 1912 – 19 April 2006) was a British "company doctor," accountant and briefly Liberal Party politician. In a long career, he saved many struggling businesses, the best known being Rolls-Royce.

== Early life ==
He was born to Thomas George Morrow, a jute mill manager in Brazil, and Jamesina Hunter, of Pilmour Links, St Andrews, Scotland. Jamesina Morrow travelled home for her confinement, but only managed to reach Manchester before giving birth to Ian. Ian Morrow was a great-great-grandson of the famous golfer Old Tom Morris.

He was educated at the Dollar Academy in Scotland.

== Career ==
To start his working career, he apprenticed with a Dundee jute company. He father insisted he take up accounting as his profession. In 1936, he became a chartered accountant.

During the Second World War, the partnership of Robson, Morrow & Co worked for the Ministries of Supply and Production. Morrow also undertook considerable work for the United Nations Relief and Rehabilitation Administration and the International Refugee Organization.

After the war, he formed a longstanding relationship with Hambros Bank, and in particular with Jocelyn Hambro, which would lead to a long, varied string of corporate assignments. He gained a reputation as a "company doctor" (a term he disliked): an expert capable of turning around troubled businesses. Perhaps his greatest challenge, and certainly his most publicised triumph, was with Rolls-Royce. The company was faced with bankruptcy during development of the RB211 aero engine. The British Government had to reluctantly step in and nationalise the business in 1971. Morrow was appointed deputy chairman (1970–71) and managing director (1971–72), and was in line to become chairman, but he resigned abruptly in October 1972 when his choice for his replacement as managing director was rejected by Michael Heseltine. Nevertheless, he had brought the crippling development costs under control and saved the company. In 1973, he was knighted for his efforts.

Morrow received an Honorary Doctorate from Heriot-Watt University in 1982

He remained highly sought after; he gave up his last public company directorship at the age of 85.

== Politics ==
After the war, he was politically active with the Liberal Party. He was Chairman of the Henley Division Liberal Association. He was elected Chairman of Bicester Parish Council. He was Liberal candidate for the Kettering division of Northamptonshire at the 1950 General Election. He did not stand for Parliament again.

General Election 1950: Kettering
Party	Candidate	Votes	%	±%
Labour	Gilbert Richard Mitchison	30,243	52.6	−1.0
Conservative	Sir Gyles Isham, Bt	22,169	38.6	−3.5
Liberal	Ian Thomas Morrow	4,692	8.2	N/A
Communist	L.P. O'Connor	368	0.6	N/A
Majority		8,074	14.0	+2.5
Turnout		57,472	88.1	13.0
Labour hold		Swing		

== Personal life ==
In 1940, he married Elizabeth Mary Thackray. They had one son and one daughter. In 1967, the marriage was dissolved and he married Sylvia Jane Taylor. They had one daughter, film producer Al Morrow.
