= Dan Bendon =

English cricketer

Personal information
- Full name: Daniel Steven Bendon
- Born: 12 January 1989 (age 37); Kettering, Northamptonshire, England
- Batting: Right-handed
- Bowling: Leg break googly

Domestic team information
- Years: Team
- 2007–2012: Bedfordshire
- 2012: Cardiff MCCU

Career statistics
Competition	First-class
Matches	1
Runs scored	5
Batting average	2.50
100s/50s	–/–
Top score	5
Balls bowled	36
Wickets	1
Bowling average	33.00
5 wickets in innings	–
10 wickets in match	–
Best bowling	1/33
Catches/stumpings	–/–
- Source: Cricinfo, 23 July 2019

Daniel Steven Bendon (born 12 January 1989) is an English former first-class cricketer.

Bendon was born at Kettering in January 1989. He was educated in Northamptonshire at the Burton Latimer School and the Sir Christopher Hatton School, before going up to Cardiff University. While studying at Cardiff, he made a single appearance in first-class cricket for Cardiff MCCU against Warwickshire at Edgbaston in 2012. Batting twice in the match, he was dismissed without scoring by Tom Milnes in the Cardiff first-innings, while in their second-innings he was dismissed for 5 runs by the same bowler. In Warwickshire's only innings, he took the wicket of Jim Troughton, taking figures of 1 for 33. In addition to playing first-class cricket, Bendon also played minor counties cricket for Bedfordshire from 2007–2012, making fifteen appearances in the Minor Counties Championship and fifteen appearances in the MCCA Knockout Trophy.
