= John Eastwood (barrister) =

British politician (1887–1952)

John Francis Eastwood OBE (13 October 1887 – 30 January 1952), was a British barrister and magistrate who served as a Conservative member of parliament in the United Kingdom from 1931 to 1940.

Born in Godalming, Surrey, the son of John Edmund Eastwood, he trained at the Inns of Court for a career at the bar and joined 2 Essex Court. In 1928 he was admitted as a freeman of the City of London, presented by the Company of Apothecaries.

At the 1931 general election, Eastwood was elected as Member of Parliament (MP) for Kettering in Northamptonshire, defeating the Labour member Samuel Perry. He held the seat at the 1935 general election, but resigned in 1940 to become a Metropolitan Police magistrate. He died in Chelsea, London aged 64.

== Family ==
On 29 April 1912 in Hampstead Eastwood married firstly Alice Leonora Zacyntha Boyle (23 February 1886 – 23 July 1933), of the family of the Earl of Cork and Orrery, and they had children. After her death, in 1934 in Surrey, he married her cousin Dorothea Constance Cecil Butler (born 1912), elder daughter of Rupert Beresford Butler and his wife Dorothea Cecil Boyle, also descended from the Earl of Cork. By her he had further children.

Parliament of the United Kingdom
Preceded by Samuel Perry	Member of Parliament for Kettering; 1931–1940	Succeeded by John Profumo
