= Heat Street =

Former news, opinion, and commentary website

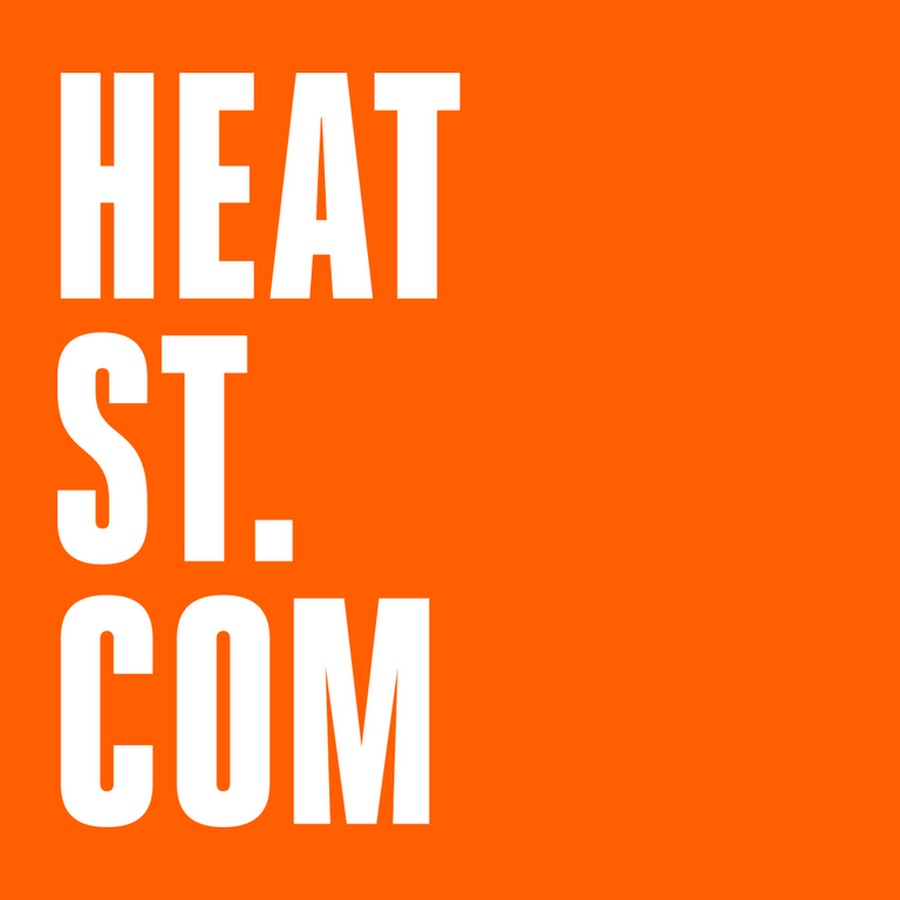
- Logo
- Website type: News and opinion
- Available in: English
- Dissolved: August 4, 2017; 9 years ago
- Owner: Dow Jones & Company
- Key people: Noah Kotch
- Website: www.heatst.com
- Commercial: Yes
- Registration: Optional, required to comment
- Launched: April 20, 2016; 10 years ago
- Current status: Merged into MarketWatch

Heat Street was a news, opinion and commentary website based in the United States and United Kingdom. The website was launched in April 2016 by U.S.-based British writer and former politician Louise Mensch. It was owned by News Corp under Dow Jones & Company and featured sections on politics, technology, culture, business, entertainment, and life. News Corporation announced that the site would shut down on August 4, 2017, to become part of MarketWatch.

The website has been described as center-right and libertarian.

== History ==
Mensch had first been exploring the idea of creating a blog under News Corp for about three years before it was pitched to Dow Jones CEO Will Lewis as a "libertarian Huffington Post". News Corp CEO Robert Thompson signed off on the project in late 2015.

The website was announced in February 2016. It launched officially on April 20, 2016, headed by British journalist Louise Mensch and television executive Noah Kotch.

Miles Goslett was hired as the site's UK editor in January 2016, prior to the site's launch. By Heat Street's seventh month of publication, it reported 8 million unique users to the site.

Mensch left Heat Street in mid-December 2016 and launched her own political blog, Patribotics, in January 2017, stating that she prefers the free hand self-publishing provides.

== Content ==
The site, which was housed under News Corp.'s Dow Jones & Company, used a more informal tone than other sites run by the company, such as Wall Street Journal. The Washington Times' Jennifer Harper described the site as follows: "The politics here are right-leaning and libertarian-minded; the publication also covers culture wars, commentary, technology, celebrity, business and assorted lifestyle matters."

In 2016, Mensch said Heat Street was defined less by politics than by "culture wars". The site has run articles sympathetic to Gamergate. Speaking to Politico, Mensch said the gaming community has been "maligned".

In December 2016, Mensch and the James Madison Project filed suit against five intelligence and law enforcement agencies including the U.S. Department of Justice's National Security Division and the Department of Homeland Security over withheld documents detailing evidence of Russian interference in the presidential election.
