= Lee Barron (politician) =

British politician

Lee Barron MP
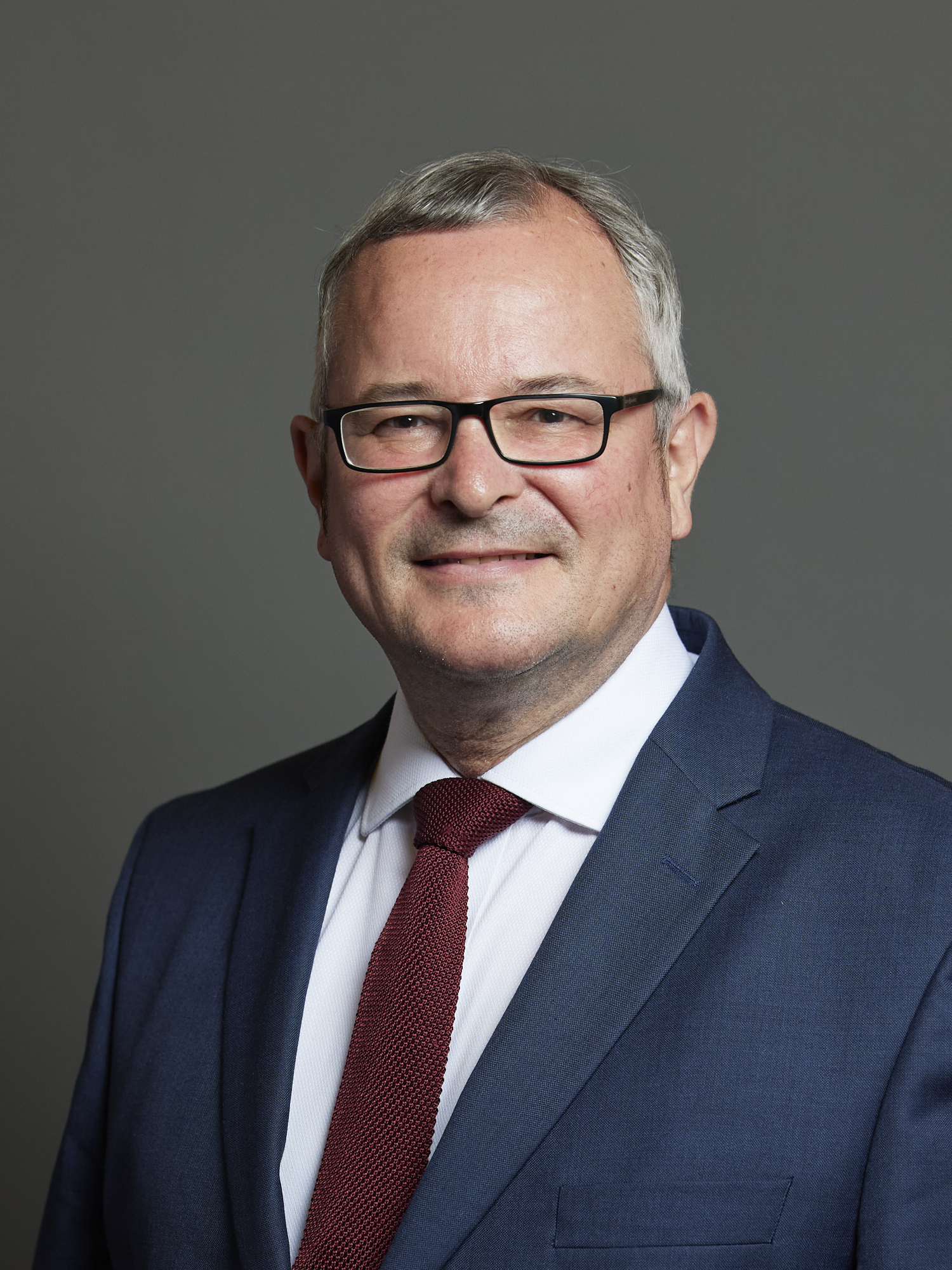
- Official portrait, 2024

Member of Parliament for Corby and East Northamptonshire
- Incumbent
- Assumed office 4 July 2024
- Preceded by: Tom Pursglove
- Majority: 6,331 (12.8%)

Personal details
- Born: Lee Jason Barron; 15 May 1970 (age 55)
- Party: Labour

Lee Jason Barron (born 15 May 1970) is a British politician and trade unionist and who has been the Member of Parliament (MP) for Corby and East Northamptonshire since 2024.

== Early life and career ==
Lee was raised in a working-class family in Far Cotton, Northampton, and went to Delapre Primary School.

Lee left school at 16 to take up an apprenticeship at Royal Mail as a postal worker. He later became the Communication Workers Union’s (CWU) Midlands Regional Secretary.

After Lee’s time working for the CWU, he became the Midlands Regional Secretary for the Trades Union Congress (TUC) representing over 1 million workers.

Lee has also been a Northampton magistrate for over 20 years.

== Political career ==
Barron is a former Northampton borough councillor and during this time was leader of the local Labour group.

In 2012, Barron was selected as the Labour candidate for the Northamptonshire Police, Fire and Crime Commissioner election, but stood down after he was caught out by a rule change that made him and many other candidates ineligible.

On 4 July 2024, Barron was elected as MP for Corby and East Northamptonshire, turning the incumbent Conservative Tom Pursglove’s 10,268 majority into his own 6,331 majority.

On 11 September 2024, Barron was elected as Chair of the All-Party Parliamentary Group (APPG) on Modernising Employment.

In November 2024, Barron voted in favour of the Terminally Ill Adults (End of Life) Bill, which proposes to legalise assisted suicide.

== Personal life ==
In a BBC radio debate before his election, Barron said he had always been a “Mod never a Rocker” and rides a "Vespa with 12 mirrors, eight spotlamps and continental whitewall tyres".
