= Patribotics =

Blog of Louise Mensch

Patribotics was the blog of British-American blogger, novelist and ex-politician Louise Mensch. The blog was launched in January 2017. In addition to hosting articles by Mensch, the site has occasionally hosted articles by Laurelai Bailey, and articles jointly written by Mensch and Claude Taylor, a former official in Bill Clinton’s White House.

Although some of the reports in Patribotics have been later confirmed by major mainstream news outlets, the blog was controversial and considered to be a collection of conspiracy theories. The blog has not had any new posts since 2020 and is no longer accessible.

== Inception ==
Louise Mensch, a former British MP who moved from England to the U.S. in 2012, launched Patribotics in January 2017, after stepping down as writer and manager of the news, opinion, and commentary site Heat Street, which she had co-launched in February 2016.

In February 2017, Mensch told The Guardian that she moved from writing for Heat Street to her own blog site because she prefers the freedom of self-publishing; she stated, "I didn't want to be subject to an editing process. Editors would ask: who are your sources? And I can't tell them." She said that she has been able to cultivate sources in the intelligence community because of her staunch advocacy of US and UK intelligence agencies following former NSA contractor Edward Snowden's revelations about mass surveillance.

== Reception ==
Mensch's inaugural post on Patribotics, titled "Dear Mr. Putin, Let’s Play Chess", was described by James Wolcott in Vanity Fair as a "must-read primer" on the Trump-Russia situation and "prescient as hell".

Mensch's February 14, 2017 article in Patribotics, which elaborated her theory that the 2016 Anthony Weiner sexting scandal was a hoax perpetrated by Russian-led hackers who also planted Hillary Clinton's emails on Anthony Weiner's laptop, was criticized by several journalists and commentators as conspiracy theory.

Several news outlets and journalists, including Keith Olbermann, have cited Mensch's Trump-Russia Patribiotics articles as credible and informed speculation. Some reviewers, including Vox, Slate and The New Republic, have asserted that Patribotics articles overall are conspiracy theories.
