= Hudson Union Society =

Social club in New York City

The Hudson Union Society is a members-only institution based in New York City that runs weekly celebrity showcases. The Hudson Union events, generally hosted by co-founder Joseph Pascal, feature special guests and audience interaction. Since its inception, the Hudson Union has hosted over 700 celebrities.

The organization has EIN 22-3834700 as a 501(c)(3) Public Charity; in 2020 it claimed total revenue of $226,826 and total assets of $59,865.

== History ==
The Hudson Union was created by Joseph Pascal and Louise Mensch, with the support of Princess Badiya of Jordan. All graduates of the University of Oxford in the U.K., they took inspiration from the Oxford Union.

== Notable speakers ==
The Hudson Union has hosted a variety of speakers, including:

- Choreographer and singer Paula Abdul
- Actress Jessica Alba
- Former US Secretary of State Madeleine Albright
- Musician and actor Kevin Bacon
- Actor Alec Baldwin
- Singer Tony Bennett
- Broadcast journalist Tom Brokaw
- Jazz musician Peter Brötzmann
- Bounty hunter Duane Chapman "Dog"
- News anchor Katie Couric
- Singer David Crosby
- Actor and Comedian Billy Crystal
- Singer Billy Ray Cyrus
- Indiana governor Mitch Daniels
- Chairman of the Joint Chiefs of Staff General Martin Dempsey
- Rapper, model and actress Rah Digga
- Singer Gloria Estefan
- Former US Senator Russ Feingold
- Actor James Franco
- Comedian and actress Whoopi Goldberg
- Former US Vice President Al Gore
- Secretary of Defense Chuck Hagel
- Conservative host Sean Hannity
- Actor Neil Patrick Harris
- Actress Anne Hathaway
- Actor and director Philip Seymour Hoffman
- US Senator John Kerry
- Political commentator Chris Matthews
- Political commentator Bill O'Reilly
- Television and radio presenter Steve Penk
- Former US Secretary of State Colin Powell
- Former US Secretary of Defense Donald Rumsfeld
- Actor William Shatner
- Former TV presenter Lorne Spicer
- Comedian and television host Jon Stewart
- Actor and writer Stanley Tucci
- Boxer Mike Tyson
- CEO of HP Meg Whitman
- Youngest winner of the Nobel Peace Prize Malala Yousafzai
- Actor Steven Schirripa
