= Sir Christopher Hatton Academy =

Location
- The Pyghtle; Wellingborough, Northamptonshire, NN8 4RP; England; 52.30855°N 0.69593°W

Information
- Former name: Sir Christopher Hatton School
- Type: Academy
- Established: 1983
- Local authority: North Northamptonshire Council
- Trust: Hatton Academies Trust
- Specialist: Maths and Computing
- Department for Education URN: 137912 Tables
- Ofsted: Reports
- Co-Principals: Nick Salisbury; Alastair Mitchell
- Gender: Mixed
- Age range: 11–18
- Enrolment: 1,481 (2025)
- Capacity: 1,254
- Houses: Luna; Orion; Titan; Equinox
- Website: www.hattonacademy.org.uk

Sir Christopher Hatton Academy (formerly Sir Christopher Hatton School) is an 11–18 mixed, secondary school and sixth form with academy status in Wellingborough, Northamptonshire, England. It was established in 1983 and is part of the Hatton Academies Trust. It is named after Sir Christopher Hatton, a prominent Tudor politician and courtier of Queen Elizabeth I.

== History ==
Logo of Sir Christopher Hatton School.

Sir Christopher Hatton School was established in 1983 following the merger of Westfield Boys School and Breezehill Girls School, on the Breezehill site. It has been a grant-maintained school and then a foundation school. It converted to academy status in March 2012 and renamed Sir Christopher Hatton Academy. It was rated 'outstanding' by Ofsted following its inspection in January 2015.

== Notable alumni ==
- Dan Bendon, cricketer
- Kylie Pentelow, journalist and television news presenter
- Tom Pursglove, politician
