= Louise Mensch =

British politician and blogger

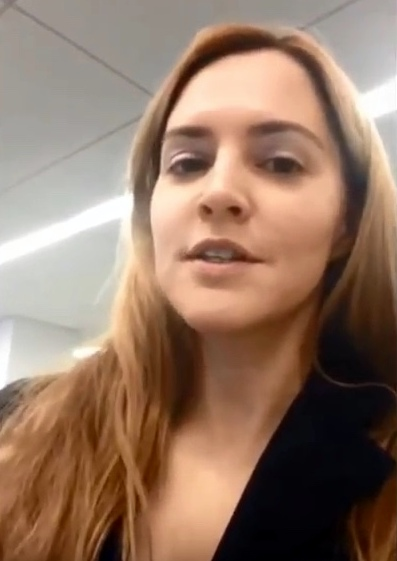
- Mensch in 2015

Member of Parliament for Corby
- In office 6 May 2010 – 29 August 2012
- Preceded by: Phil Hope
- Succeeded by: Andy Sawford

Personal details
- Born: Louise Daphne Bagshawe; 28 June 1971 (age 55) Westminster, London, England
- Party: Conservative (UK) (before 1996, 1997–present); Labour (UK) (1996–1997); Republican (US) (2017–2019)
- Spouses: Anthony LoCicero (m. 2000; div. 2009) Peter Mensch (m. 2011; div. 2019)
- Children: 4
- Relatives: Tilly Bagshawe (sister)
- Education: Christ Church, Oxford

Louise Daphne Mensch (née Bagshawe; born 28 June 1971) is a British blogger, novelist, and former Conservative Member of Parliament. In the 1990s she became known as a writer of chick lit novels under her maiden name Louise Bagshawe. She was elected Conservative MP for Corby at the 2010 UK general election.

Mensch resigned as an MP in August 2012 to move to New York City to live with her second husband, American music manager Peter Mensch. She began working for News Corp in 2014, and co-launched its Heat Street website in February 2016. Since leaving Heat Street in December 2016, she has published primarily on her blog Patribotics, which she launched in January 2017, and her Twitter account. She left News Corp entirely in March 2017.

Mensch and Heat Street have since courted controversy by promoting unverified claims, hoaxes, and conspiracy theories about the Trump administration and its ties to the Russian Federation. BuzzFeed called Mensch an "anti-Russian influence crusader" and one of a number of "anti-Trump public figures [who] share unreliable information".

== Early life ==
Louise Daphne Bagshawe was born in Westminster, London, daughter of Nicholas Wilfrid Bagshawe and Daphne Margaret (Triggs) Bagshawe, and was raised a Roman Catholic. Her father is descended from the recusant Catholic Bagshawe family, of Wormhill Hall, near Buxton, Derbyshire, and of Oakes-in-Norton. She was educated at Beechwood Sacred Heart School, Tunbridge Wells, and Woldingham School, a Catholic girls' boarding school in Surrey. She read English Language and Literature at Christ Church, Oxford, and was Secretary of the Oxford Union. She has a brother and two sisters, one of whom, Tilly Bagshawe, is a freelance journalist and author.

== As writer ==
Mensch won a 'Young Poet of the Year' award in 1989, at the age of 18. Following a six-month internship at MTV Europe, she worked as a press officer with EMI Records and then as a marketing official for Sony Music.

Mensch went on to a career writing novels in the chick lit fiction genre, publishing seventeen works in all: fifteen of which have appeared under her maiden name. They sold a total of over two million copies. Her first novel, Career Girls, was published in 1995. Mensch is an outspoken advocate of the genre, and has stated that it encourages girls to be ambitious. Before her run for parliament, she said: "There was so much sex in the first novel, I thought, there is no way I am ever going to be an MP. How will I get past the blue rinse brigade?" Reflecting further on her books, she stated: "All of them feature feminist heroines making it on their own. I simply couldn't write about some drippy Cinderella because I don't admire those women."

== Political career ==
Mensch joined the Conservative Party when she was 14; her parents supported the party. Subsequently, in 1996, she switched to the Labour Party, saying she believed Tony Blair to be "socially liberal but an economic Tory". By 1997, she returned to the Conservatives, helping her mother Daphne win a seat on East Sussex County Council from the Liberal Democrats; and campaigned in the 1997, 2001 and 2005 general elections. In 2001, Mensch co-founded the Oxonian Society, later renamed the Hudson Union Society, with Joseph Pascal and Princess Badiya bint El Hassan of Jordan.

Conservative party leader David Cameron placed Mensch on his "A-List" of Conservative candidates in 2006. In October 2006, she was selected to stand in the constituency of Corby, which she won at the 2010 general election with a majority of 1,951, defeating Labour incumbent Phil Hope. In June 2010, she was elected by other Conservative MPs to serve on the Select Committee for the Department of Culture, Media and Sport.

=== Murdoch phone hacking affair ===
On 19 July 2011, in the hearings of the House of Commons Select Committee for Culture, Media and Sport, Mensch interrogated James and Rupert Murdoch concerning their roles in the News of the World phone hacking scandal.

Political blogger Bagehot in The Economist named Mensch as the "surprise star" of the hearing, writing that her "sharp, precise, coolly scornful questions" contrasted with her "waffling, pompous" fellow committee members, and citing her clever confrontation of the Murdochs.

In the course of the hearings, Mensch erroneously stated that Piers Morgan had written in his autobiography about conducting phone hacking while he was the editor of the Daily Mirror. When challenged on CNN by Morgan, Mensch cited the protection of parliamentary privilege and declined either to withdraw the allegation or to repeat it. She later apologised to Morgan, and stated that she had misread a newspaper report about his book.

Three days after the hearing, Mensch received an email that alleged, among other things, that she had taken drugs and danced while drunk with violinist Nigel Kennedy at a club in Birmingham in the 1990s. Mensch publicly released the email, stating that the allegations were "highly probable" but said that she regretted only that others had to see her dancing and that she would not be deterred from asking further questions about phone hacking. Members of the Parliamentary committee denounced the attempt to intimidate Mensch, who subsequently admitted in The Sunday Times that she had used class A drugs.

=== Resignation ===
On 6 August 2012, Mensch resigned as the MP for Corby in order to move with her second husband, American music manager Peter Mensch, to New York City. Mensch had appeared likely to be promoted in the expected September government reshuffle. She was appointed to the nominal position of Crown Steward and Bailiff of the Manor of Northstead on 29 August 2012, thus vacating her seat.

=== Regulation of social networking websites ===
Following the rioting in England in 2011, Mensch called for social media services Twitter and Facebook to be shut down or to "take an hour off" during disturbances to stop the spread of false rumours wasting police resources. She compared the action with brief interruptions to road and rail networks during emergencies. However, some other Twitter users compared such action to the online censorship of regimes such as Iran and China, whilst Sussex police said they had used Twitter to stop rumours.

In June 2012, a man was given a 26-week prison sentence suspended for two years for sending Mensch an offensive and threatening email including threats to her children. Following his conviction, Mensch called for networking sites to identify anonymous bullies saying it was impossible for the victim to ascertain the seriousness of the threat posed, while the bullies felt they could do as they pleased without fear of retribution.

=== Cyberbullying ===
In May 2012, Mensch used her Twitter account to condemn abusive and threatening tweets that she had received, describing them as "misogyny and bullying". The tweets were subsequently reported in the mainstream press, and she drew praise and support from Twitter users for drawing attention to the issue, as well as from public figures Jeremy Vine and Isabel Hardman.

In May 2015, after that year's general election, Mensch herself was accused of cyberbullying Abby Tomlinson, the teenaged leader of the 'Milifandom'. Former Labour party deputy leader John Prescott "tweeted that Mensch's behaviour breached the Independent Press Standards Organisation's code on harassment", The Guardian reported at the time. Mensch stated that she would be deleting many of her tweets "as I do not wish to be accused of 'harassing'." Mensch denied the accusation, asserting that she had only criticised Tomlinson. Shortly afterwards, she wrote a 4,000-word blog entry to reiterate that she had not bullied Tomlinson and made new assertions about the sixth-form student.

In 2017, Mensch was alleged to have harassed a number of individuals who have taken issue with the veracity of the various conspiracy theories she has espoused online about Russia. Mensch, the Daily Beast has reported, has "resorted to ad hominem attacks on people with whom she disagrees ... notably accusing Naval Reserve intelligence officer and former FBI double agent Naveed Jamali of disseminating 'what can only be described as pro-Kremlin propaganda". Mensch added that she was especially incensed by Jamali's suggestion on Twitter that the Russians did not recruit top-secret leaker Edward Snowden "as Mensch has claimed" and initially were not even sure that he was "on the level."

== Journalism and internet ventures ==
In June 2012, Mensch joined forces with former Labour digital adviser Luke Bozier to set up a social networking website, a politics-based rival to Twitter. The site, named Menshn, pronounced "mention", allowed users to select their topic of interest. Mensch hoped to raise venture capital finance. The site was initially criticised by IT industry experts for using http instead of secure https to communicate passwords. Bozier disputed this claim, but the site switched to the secure protocol. Menshn closed in February 2013.

After leaving Parliament and moving to the US in 2012, Mensch began working as an independent journalist and also wrote articles for several newspapers, including The Times, and The Guardian. In The Guardian she wrote two articles advocating "reality-based feminism", in particular "Conservative feminism" or "Tory feminism", and critical of Britain's "modern feminist movement" (including equality impact assessment), which she called "ultra-feminism" and contrasted unfavourably with "American feminism".

In May 2014, Mensch started developing new digital projects for News Corporation. In February 2016 she co-launched Heat Street, a libertarian news, opinion and commentary website, with television executive Noah Kotch. On Heat Street, Mensch interviewed Adam Baldwin regarding the movement involved in the Gamergate controversy, claiming that it was Baldwin who created the Gamergate hashtag to "describe the scandal of falsely accused young men", and suggesting it is a hashtag that "divided the feminists – like me – and the fauxminists".

Mensch left Heat Street in mid-December 2016, and launched her own political blog, Patribotics, in January 2017. The blog is controversial, and cites unnamed sources in the intelligence community, publishing numerous conspiracy theories that have either remained unverified or debunked altogether. Mensch has stated that she prefers the freedom of self-publishing, which having her own blog affords; she told The Guardian, "I didn't want to be subject to an editing process. Editors would ask: who are your sources? And I can't tell them."

Mensch left News Corp entirely in March 2017.

== Commentary on the 2016 US presidential election ==
=== FISA warrant claim ===
In November 2016, Heat Street published an article titled "Exclusive: FBI 'Granted FISA Warrant' Covering Trump Camp's Ties To Russia", written by Mensch. Although ultimately it was later confirmed that US law enforcement agencies did utilise a FISA warrant against one former Trump aide, most of Mensch's claims were later debunked.

According to Mensch's article, the FISA warrant giving permission to investigate the Trump campaign was granted in October 2016, in "connection with the investigation of suspected activity between the server [in Trump Tower] and two banks, SVB Bank and Alfa Bank." The article also claimed that "it is thought in the intelligence community that the warrant covers any 'US person' connected to this investigation, and thus covers Donald Trump and at least three further men." In January 2017, Paul Wood on BBC News reported a FISA warrant issued on 15 October 2016 to intercept the electronic records from two Russian banks in relation to the Trump campaign; a week later, McClatchy independently confirmed the BBC report, and in February 2017 The Guardian wrote that "former officials said they believed that the Mensch and BBC account of the Fisa warrants was correct."

However, Glenn Kessler, writing in The Washington Post, wrote that McClatchy's article "like that of the BBC, differed significantly from the Heat Street account. Despite this, Mensch often cited the McClatchy article as evidence that her story was true.

In March 2017, the Trump administration cited the Heat Street and BBC stories as evidence for Trump's claims on Twitter that President Barack Obama had illegally wiretapped his phones. According to Kessler the BBC's account differed substantially from that of Mensch, the BBC alleging that: "Neither Mr Trump nor his associates are named in the FISA order, which would only cover foreign citizens or foreign entities — in this case the Russian banks." Kessler stated: "The Washington Post for months has sought to confirm this report of a FISA warrant related to the Trump campaign but has been unable to do so. Presumably, other major news organisations have tried to do so as well. So one has to take this claim with a huge dose of skepticism." Kessler added that the assertion that the FISA warrant was to examine possible activity between two Russian banks and a computer server in Trump Tower had not been confirmed by US news organisations, and that the Trump Organisation server communicating with Russian banks may have actually been located in Philadelphia, not Trump Tower. Moreover, according to the FBI as reported by The New York Times in October 2016, "there could be an innocuous explanation [for the server traffic], like a marketing email or spam."

In April 2017, The Washington Post reported that, during the summer of 2016, the FBI obtained a FISA warrant to monitor Carter Page, an advisor to the Trump campaign; the story was later corrected to show the warrant was obtained in October 2016, after Page had left the Trump campaign. The warrant was granted as part of an investigation into possible links between Russia and the Trump campaign. Mensch had claimed that various revelations vindicated her own narratives about FISA warrants. The FISA warrants on Page did not entail the surveillance of two Russian banks, as Mensch had done, and Mensch had not identified Page in her report.

=== Conspiracy theories regarding Donald Trump and Russia ===
During and after the 2016 US presidential election, Mensch's political commentary and social media accounts promoted numerous various conspiracy theories about the Russian government, Donald Trump and various individuals in Trump's circle. Mensch claims that she has seen evidence that Vladimir Putin had Andrew Breitbart murdered to make room for Steve Bannon at Breitbart. She has stated that the 2017 Istanbul nightclub shooting was a Russian false flag operation, with Russian intelligence operatives posing as ISIL terrorists; that onetime Trump chief political strategist Steve "Bannon and his team" were behind bomb threats to Jewish community centres; and that Russian intelligence operatives planted Hillary Clinton's emails on Anthony Weiner's laptop just before the 2016 presidential election. Mensch has also accused numerous people and organisations of being Russian "shills", "moles" and "agents of influence", including Facebook founder Mark Zuckerberg, Peter Thiel, Israeli Prime Minister Benjamin Netanyahu, and elements of Mossad (Israel's intelligence service).

In April 2017, Mensch claimed that "sources with links to the intelligence community" told her that it "is believed that Carter Page," [the former campaign aide and foreign policy adviser, to Donald Trump] went to Moscow in early July carrying with him a pre-recorded tape of Trump offering to change American policy if he were to be elected, to make it more favourable to Putin. In exchange, Page was authorised directly by Trump to request the help of the Russian government in hacking the election." No evidence has ever surfaced or been published to corroborate any of these allegations either. When others have questioned her claims, she has often attacked them on social media as being witting or unwitting agents of Russia.

In May 2017, Mensch wrote that then-Senator Orrin Hatch, Republican of Utah, who was named as "the 'Designated Survivor' at the inauguration of Donald Trump ... is likely to become President if charges" against President Trump, Vice-President Mike Pence, and then-Speaker of the House Paul Ryan" were soon brought, "according to the evidence, of illegal collusion with Russia, money laundering, and obstruction of justice". Federal authorities had gathered "voluminous evidence" that "Donald Trump... knowingly colluded with the Russian state in the hacking of the U.S election, and laundered Russian money through shell companies". Mensch added that federal authorities had uncovered evidence that Pence had "obstructed justice, conspired to obstruct justice.. and violated the Logan Act." She also claimed that conversations of Paul Ryan had "been legally intercepted", were on tape, and included Ryan admitting that he knew Russian money was being laundered into the Republican Party. Because Trump, Pence and Ryan might be removed from office at any moment after facing criminal charges, Mensch said, Senator Hatch would likely be named President. None of these claims turned out to be true, and none of these events that Mensch forecast ever occurred.

Mensch claimed that former US Representative Anthony Weiner was brought down as the result of a Russian intelligence operation to put the Clinton emails back in the news in the final days of the 2016 presidential election, saying: "I can exclusively report that there is ample evidence that suggests that Weiner was sexting not with a 15 year old girl but with a hacker, working for Russia, part of the US hacking group 'Crackas With Attitude', who hacked the head of the CIA, and a great many FBI agents, police officers, and other law enforcement officials." When the 15-year-old girl went public with her story for a BuzzFeed article, Mensch continued to state that Weiner was speaking to hackers posing as underage girls, while he also happened to also be in touch with a real 15-year-old girl at the same time.

== Personal life ==
In 2000, she married Italian-American real estate developer Anthony LoCicero. They have three children, but separated in 2009 and later divorced. In June 2011, she married American music manager Peter Mensch, whom she first met 20 years earlier, and resided with him in New York City until their divorce in August 2019. She currently lives in Manhattan where she invests in real estate.

Mensch disclosed in May 2016 that she was diagnosed with attention deficit hyperactivity disorder (ADHD), which made her realise she was "self medicating" with wine for stress and, as a result, has almost completely given up alcohol.

=== Drug use ===
Mensch has also commented, on BBC TV's Question Time during a debate on calls to decriminalise hard drugs, about taking hard drugs in her twenties, and subsequently told the press, in 2012: "It is something that I regret incredibly, that in my youth ... I messed with my brain. I said we all do stupid things when we are young. It's had long-term mental health effects on me."

== Bibliography ==
Novels

Writing as Louise Bagshawe:

- Career Girls (1995)
- The Movie (1996) aka Triple Feature
- Tall Poppies (1997)
- Venus Envy (1998)
- A Kept Woman (2000) aka For All the Wrong Reasons
- When She Was Bad... (2001)
- The Devil You Know (2003)
- Monday's Child (2004) aka The Go–To Girl
- Tuesday's Child (2005)
- Sparkles (2006)
- Glamour (2007)
- Glitz (2008)
- Passion (2009)
- Desire (2010)
- Destiny (2011)

Writing as Louise Mensch:

- Beauty (2014)
- Career Game (2015)

Anthology

- Five Romantic Reads (2005; with Donna Hay, Laura Wolf, Jane Elizabeth Varley and Stella Chaplin)

Parliament of the United Kingdom
Preceded by Phil Hope	Member of Parliament for Corby; 2010–2012	Succeeded by Andy Sawford
