= Roger Freeman, Baron Freeman =

British politician (1942–2025)

The Right Honourable The Lord Freeman PC
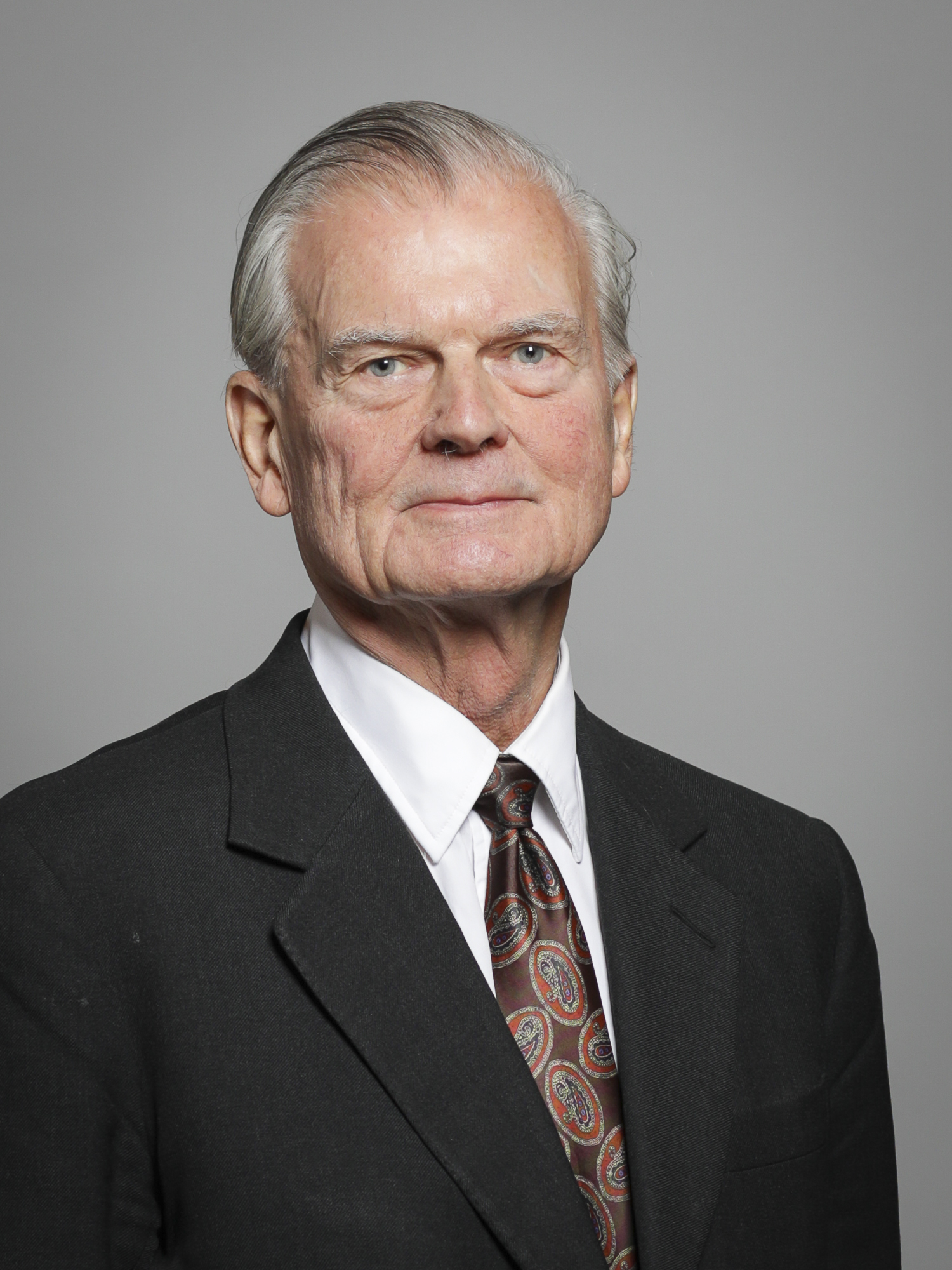
- Official portrait, 2019

Chancellor of the Duchy of Lancaster
- In office 26 June 1995 – 2 May 1997
- Prime Minister: John Major
- Preceded by: David Hunt
- Succeeded by: David Clark
Junior ministerial offices
Minister of State for Defence Procurement
In office 20 July 1994 – 26 June 1995
Prime Minister	John Major
Preceded by	Jonathan Aitken
Succeeded by	James Arbuthnot
Minister of State for Public Transport
In office 4 May 1990 – 20 July 1994
Prime Minister	Margaret Thatcher; John Major
Preceded by	Michael Portillo
Succeeded by	John Watts
Parliamentary Under-Secretary of State for Health
In office 16 December 1988 – 4 May 1990
Prime Minister	Margaret Thatcher
Preceded by	Edwina Currie
Succeeded by	Stephen Dorrell
Parliamentary Under-Secretary of State for the Armed Forces
In office 21 May 1986 – 15 December 1988
Prime Minister	Margaret Thatcher
Preceded by	The Lord Trefgarne
Succeeded by	Michael Neubert
Parliamentary offices
Member of the House of Lords
Lord Temporal
Life peerage 29 October 1997 – 1 October 2020
Member of Parliament for Kettering
In office 9 June 1983 – 8 April 1997
Preceded by	William Homewood
Succeeded by	Phil Sawford

Personal details
- Born: Roger Norman Freeman; 27 May 1942 Wirral, Cheshire, England
- Died: 2 June 2025 (aged 83) London, England
- Party: Conservative
- Education: Balliol College, Oxford

Roger Norman Freeman, Baron Freeman, PC (27 May 1942 – 2 June 2025) was a British politician. A member of the Conservative Party, he served as Chancellor of the Duchy of Lancaster in the Cabinet of Prime Minister John Major from 1995 to 1997. He was a Member of Parliament (MP) representing the constituency of Kettering from the 1983 general election until his defeat in 1997. He was made a life peer in 1997.

== Early life and career ==
Freeman was born in the Wirral on 25 May 1942, and privately educated at Whitgift School in Croydon.

He then studied at Balliol College, Oxford. When he was at Oxford, he was the President of the Oxford University Conservative Association in Hilary Term 1964. Before entering Parliament, he was a chartered accountant working for an investment bank.

== Political career ==
After an unsuccessful attempt to be elected as MP for Don Valley at the 1979 general election, Freeman was elected as MP for Kettering in 1983. Before joining the Cabinet, he served as Parliamentary Under Secretary of State for the Armed Forces (1986–88), Parliamentary Under Secretary of State for Health (1988–90), and Minister for Public Transport (1990–1995) ranking as Minister of State. In that post he was responsible for steering through the House of Commons the Railways Bill, providing for the privatisation of British Rail and enacted as the Railways Act 1993. At the time he achieved a degree of notoriety with his comment on a "cheap and cheerful" rail service being provided for typists.

In the 1993 Birthday Honours, Freeman was sworn of the Privy Council.

In 1995, he was brought into the Cabinet by John Major as Chancellor of the Duchy of Lancaster. In this role, he made a ministerial visit to Lancaster Royal Grammar School in 1995.

He also inaugurated the process of privatisation of HM Stationery Office (HMSO), though as a former minister for MOD Procurement, one of HMSO's major customers, he could be adjudged to have had a conflict of interest. He therefore misjudged the effect of privatisation on HMSO, which, rather than preserve the business as a whole, and protecting jobs, hastened the already-established process of splitting the business into its various parts, resulting in the destruction of some, and the sale of others to foreign owners. The loss of jobs has been massive. The National Audit Office later denounced the whole process as a debacle. It could be argued that he, along with his colleague Lord North in the other place, may have misled the house.

He did his best to make the dying days of the Major government more colourful by appearing on Channel 4's 'bottom up' television programme The People's Parliament. Appearing by video link, he was quizzed by the female Scots host on the alleged unapproachability of politicians "in grey suits". Freeman quipped: "Well, I can't just start turning up to work in a jumper!". Freeman's remark though was better-judged than any viewer might have realised at the time. The Major government's strategy weekend where Cabinet members arrived wearing jumpers was much lampooned.

Narrowly defeated in the 1997 general election, he was shortly afterwards raised to the peerage as Baron Freeman, of Dingley in the County of Northamptonshire in the 1997 Prime Minister's Resignation Honours. He sat in the House of Lords until his retirement on 1 October 2020.

== Charitable associations ==
Lord Freeman was the chairman of the charity SkillForce from 2004 to 2016. He was later a Patron of SkillForce and the Independent Transport Commission.

== Personal life and death ==
His wife, Jennifer Freeman, is a former Secretary of the Victorian Society and is a specialist developer of architecturally historic buildings. He died following a stroke and a protracted illness on 2 June 2025, at the age of 83.

== Arms ==
Coat of arms of Roger Freeman, Baron Freeman
Crest A badger sejant erect Proper supporting with the forepaws a pair of dividing compasses points downwards Or. Escutcheon Argent on a pale cotised Sable a pale Argent thereon three roses Gules barbed and seeded Or over all two bars wavy gemel counterchanged. Supporters On either side a springer spaniel Sable muzzled and bibbed Argent gorged with a plain collar attached thereto a chain flexed over the back Or. Motto Perpendens Perficiens

Parliament of the United Kingdom
Preceded by William Homewood	Member of Parliament for Kettering; 1983–1997	Succeeded by Phil Sawford
Political offices
Preceded by David Hunt	Chancellor of the Duchy of Lancaster; 1995–1997	Succeeded by David Clark
