= William Powell (Corby MP) =

British politician (1948–2022)

Member of Parliament for Corby
- In office 9 June 1983 – 8 April 1997
- Preceded by: Constituency created
- Succeeded by: Phil Hope

Personal details
- Born: 3 August 1948 Crickhowell, Powys, Wales
- Died: 23 March 2022 (aged 73)
- Party: Conservative

William Rhys Powell (3 August 1948 – 23 March 2022) was a British Conservative politician. A barrister, he was MP for Corby from 1983 to 1997, when he lost the seat to Labour's Phil Hope. Born in Crickhowell, Wales, he was educated at Lancing College and Emmanuel College, Cambridge.

Powell died on 23 March 2022, at the age of 73.
