= Corby and East Northamptonshire =

UK Parliament constituency (since 1983)

Coordinates: 52.48°N 0.53°W

- County constituency for the House of Commons
- Interactive map of boundaries from 2024
- Location within the East Midlands
- County: Northamptonshire
- Electorate: 76,748 (March 2020)
- Major settlements: Corby, Raunds, Thrapston and Oundle

Current constituency
- Created: 1983 (renamed in 2024)
- Member of Parliament: Lee Barron (Labour)
- Created from: Kettering and Wellingborough

Corby and East Northamptonshire is a constituency (Note: A county constituency (for the purposes of election expenses and type of returning officer)) in the English county of Northamptonshire. It is represented in the House of Commons of the UK Parliament since July 2024 by Lee Barron, of the Labour Party. (Note: As with all constituencies, the constituency elects one Member of Parliament (MP) by the first-past-the-post system of election at least every five years.)

Although the constituency had always, since its creation in 1983, contained parts of the former District of East Northamptonshire, it was formally known as Corby up until the 2024 general election. The constituency had sometimes been informally called "Corby and East Northamptonshire", but the 2007 Parliamentary Constituencies Order and Whitaker's Almanack both make it clear that, until 2024, its official name was "Corby". Further to the 2023 review of Westminster constituencies, the Boundary Commission for England recommended that it be officially renamed Corby and East Northamptonshire.

== Constituency profile ==
The Corby and East Northamptonshire constituency is located in Northamptonshire. It covers the large town of Corby, with a population of around 68,000, and the rural areas to its east. Other settlements in the constituency include the small market towns of Oundle, Thrapston and Raunds. Corby grew rapidly as an industrial town in the 1930s due to the establishment of a large steelworks. It has been nicknamed Little Scotland due to the large numbers of Scottish people who moved to Corby to work in the steel industry. Central Corby has high levels of deprivation whilst the rural areas of the constituency, particularly in the east around Oundle, are affluent.

On average, residents of the constituency have average incomes and low levels of education and professional employment when compared to nationwide figures. At the local council, most of the constituency is represented by Reform UK, although some Labour Party councillors were elected in Corby and some Conservatives were elected in the rural east. Voters in the constituency showed strong support for leaving the European Union in the 2016 referendum, with an estimated 60% voting in favour of Brexit compared to 52% nationally.

== History ==
From 1832 – 1918, the village of Corby was part of the North Northamptonshire constituency, which consisted of most of the Soke of Peterborough, the towns of Oundle and Thrapston and the surrounding villages and hamlets of north-eastern Northamptonshire.

The North Northamptonshire constituency boundaries were changed slightly in 1885, with some of the constituency being transferred to the newly created Mid Northamptonshire constituency. However, Corby remained within the revised constituency of North Northamptonshire.

The North Northamptonshire constituency was abolished in 1918 for that year's general election, and from 1918, Corby was part of the Kettering constituency. Corby remained part of the Kettering constituency until 1983. The Parliamentary seat of 'Corby' was created due to population increases in and around the town of Corby for the 1983 general election.

The constituency was created from parts of the seats of Kettering and Wellingborough. It is named after the town of Corby in Northamptonshire, and also covers much of the local government district of East Northamptonshire, but excluding Rushden and Higham Ferrers which are in the Wellingborough constituency. Since creation, the Corby constituency has been a marginal seat being won by the party that won the national election at each general election since its creation, with Corby inclined towards Labour, and the rural towns and villages of East Northamptonshire mostly Conservative. The first Member of Parliament elected for the constituency in 1983 was William Powell, who represented the Conservatives for three sessions of Parliament until 1997. Labour then held the seat until 2010.

On 6 August 2012, MP for the seat since 2010 Louise Mensch (formerly Louise Bagshawe) announced she was resigning, triggering a by-election held on 15 November 2012. Labour's Andy Sawford won, becoming the first Labour MP for the seat since Phil Hope was defeated in 2010, and only the second in the seat's history. This was Labour's first by-election win from a Conservative since the 1997 Wirral South by-election. At the 2015 general election Tom Pursglove standing for the Conservatives won with a small majority. He won again with a similar margin in 2017 and in 2019 Tom Pursglove took the seat for the third time, but with a majority of over 10,000, turning Corby into a non-marginal seat by Conservative Party standards.

At the 2024 general election, the seat was gained by Labour's Lee Barron amidst their national landslide victory, continuing the seat's bellwether streak of voting for the party that won nationally at every general election since its creation in 1983.

== Boundaries ==
=== Historic (Corby) ===
1983–2010: The District of Corby, and the District of East Northamptonshire wards of Barnwell, Brigstock, Drayton, Forest, Irthlingborough, King's Cliffe, Lower Nene, Margaret Beaufort, Oundle, Raunds, Ringstead, Stanwick, Thrapston, Willibrook, and Woodford.

2010–2021: The Borough of Corby, and the District of East Northamptonshire wards of Barnwell, Dryden, Fineshade, Irthlingborough, King's Forest, Lower Nene, Lyveden, Oundle, Prebendal, Raunds Saxon, Raunds Windmill, Ringstead, Stanwick, Thrapston, and Woodford.

2021–2024: With effect from 1 April 2021, the Borough of Corby and the District of East Northamptonshire were abolished and absorbed into the new unitary authority of North Northamptonshire. From that date, the constituency comprised the District of North Northamptonshire wards of Corby Rural, Corby West, Irthlingborough, Kingswood, Lloyds, Oakley, Oundle, Raunds and Thrapston.

=== Current (Corby and East Northamptonshire) ===
Following the 2023 review of Westminster constituencies, which came into effect for the 2024 general election, the constituency was reduced in size in order to bring it within the electoral quota by transferring parts of the Corby Rural and Irthlingborough wards to Kettering, and Wellingborough and Rushden respectively.

Further to a local government boundary review which came into effect in May 2025, the constituency now comprises the following wards of North Northamptonshire:

- Corby West; Gretton & Weldon; Irthlingborough (small part excluding the town of Irthlingborough); Kingswood; Lloyds & Corby Village; Oakley; Oundle; Raunds; Thrapston.

== Members of Parliament ==
Kettering and Wellingborough prior to 1983

Election	Member	Party
1983	William Powell	Conservative
1997	Phil Hope	Labour
2010	Louise Bagshawe	Conservative
2012 by-election	Andy Sawford	Labour
2015	Tom Pursglove	Conservative
2024	Lee Barron	Labour

== Elections ==
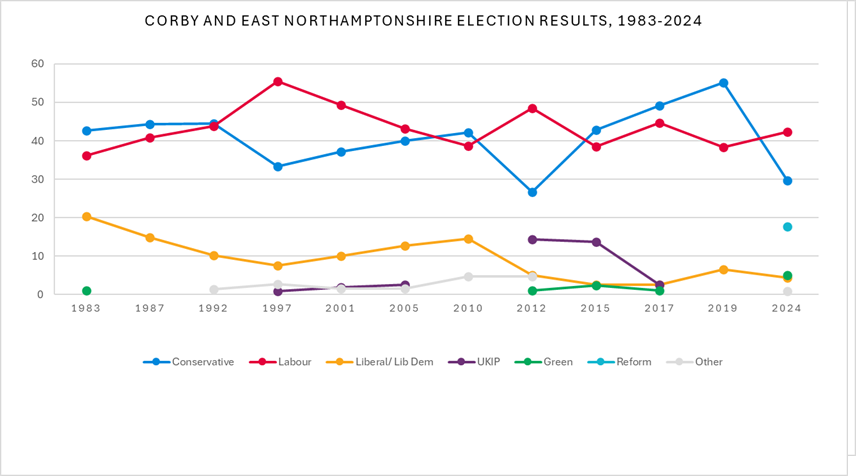
Corby and East Northamptonshire election results 1983-2024

=== Elections in the 2020s ===
General election 2024: Corby and East Northamptonshire
Party	Candidate	Votes	%	±%
Labour	Lee Barron	21,020	42.4	+3.9
Conservative	Tom Pursglove	14,689	29.6	−25.0
Reform	Edward McDonald	8,760	17.7	N/A
Green	Lee Forster	2,507	5.1	N/A
Liberal Democrats	Chris Lofts	2,191	4.4	−2.4
Independent	Karen Blott	422	0.9	N/A
Majority		6,331	12.8	N/A
Turnout		49,589	63.8	−6.4
Registered electors		78,787		
Labour gain from Conservative		Swing	▲14.8	

=== Elections in the 2010s ===
2019 notional result
Party	Vote	%
Conservative	29,443	54.6
Labour	20,767	38.5
Liberal Democrats	3,680	6.8
Majority	8,676	16.1
Turnout	53,890	70.2
Electorate	76,748	

General election 2019: Corby
Party	Candidate	Votes	%	±%
Conservative	Tom Pursglove	33,410	55.2	+6.0
Labour	Beth Miller	23,142	38.3	−6.4
Liberal Democrats	Chris Stanbra	3,923	6.5	+3.9
Majority		10,268	16.9	+12.4
Turnout		60,475	70.2	−2.6
Conservative hold		Swing	+6.25	

General election 2017: Corby
Party	Candidate	Votes	%	±%
Conservative	Tom Pursglove	29,534	49.2	+6.4
Labour	Beth Miller	26,844	44.7	+6.2
Liberal Democrats	Chris Stanbra	1,545	2.6	0.0
UKIP	Sam Watts	1,495	2.5	−11.2
Green	Steven Scrutton	579	1.0	−1.4
Majority		2,690	4.5	+0.2
Turnout		59,637	72.8	+2.4
Conservative hold		Swing	+0.1	

General election 2015: Corby
Party	Candidate	Votes	%	±%
Conservative	Tom Pursglove	24,023	42.8	+0.6
Labour Co-op	Andy Sawford	21,611	38.5	−0.1
UKIP	Margot Parker	7,708	13.7	−0.6
Liberal Democrats	Peter Harris	1,458	2.6	−11.9
Green	Jonathan Hornett	1,374	2.4	+1.3
Majority		2,412	4.3	+0.7
Turnout		56,174	70.4	+1.2
Conservative hold		Swing	+0.4	

2012 Corby by-election
Party	Candidate	Votes	%	±%
Labour Co-op	Andy Sawford	17,267	48.4	+9.8
Conservative	Christine Emmett	9,476	26.6	−15.6
UKIP	Margot Parker	5,108	14.3	New
Liberal Democrats	Jill Hope	1,770	5.0	−9.5
BNP	Gordon Riddell	614	1.7	−3.0
English Democrat	David Wickham	432	1.2	New
Green	Jonathan Hornett	378	1.1	New
Independent	Ian Gillman	212	0.6	New
Cannabis Law Reform	Peter Reynolds	137	0.4	New
Elvis Loves Pets	David Bishop	99	0.3	New
Independent	Mr Mozzarella	73	0.2	New
Young People's Party	Rohen Kapur	39	0.1	New
Democracy 2015	Adam Lotun	35	0.1	New
United People's Party	Christopher Scotton	25	0.1	New
Majority		7,791	21.8	N/A
Turnout		35,665	44.8	−24.4
Labour Co-op gain from Conservative		Swing	+12.57	

General election 2010: Corby
Party	Candidate	Votes	%	±%
Conservative	Louise Bagshawe	22,886	42.2	+2.3
Labour Co-op	Phil Hope	20,991	38.6	−4.5
Liberal Democrats	Portia Wilson	7,834	14.5	+1.7
BNP	Roy Davies	2,525	4.7	New
Majority		1,895	3.5	N/A
Turnout		54,180	69.2	+3.6
Conservative gain from Labour Co-op		Swing	+3.4	

=== Elections in the 2000s ===
General election 2005: Corby
Party	Candidate	Votes	%	±%
Labour Co-op	Phil Hope	20,913	43.1	−6.2
Conservative	Andrew Griffith	19,396	40.0	+2.8
Liberal Democrats	David Radcliffe	6,184	12.7	+2.6
UKIP	Ian Gillman	1,278	2.6	+0.8
Socialist Labour	Steven Carey	499	1.0	−0.6
Independent	John Morris	257	0.5	New
Majority		1,517	3.1	−9.0
Turnout		48,527	65.6	+0.6
Labour Co-op hold		Swing	-4.5	

General election 2001: Corby
Party	Candidate	Votes	%	±%
Labour Co-op	Phil Hope	23,283	49.3	−6.1
Conservative	Andrew Griffith	17,583	37.2	+3.8
Liberal Democrats	Kevin Scudder	4,751	10.1	+2.6
UKIP	Ian Gillman	855	1.8	+0.9
Socialist Labour	Andrew Dickson	750	1.6	New
Majority		5,700	12.1	−9.9
Turnout		47,222	65.0	−12.9
Labour Co-op hold		Swing	-5.0	

=== Elections in the 1990s ===
General election 1997: Corby
Party	Candidate	Votes	%	±%
Labour Co-op	Phil Hope	29,888	55.4	+11.5
Conservative	William Powell	18,028	33.4	−11.1
Liberal Democrats	Ian Hankison	4,045	7.5	−2.7
Referendum	Sebastian Riley-Smith	1,356	2.5	New
UKIP	Ian Gillman	507	0.9	New
Natural Law	Jane Bence	133	0.2	New
Majority		11,860	22.0	N/A
Turnout		53,957	77.9	−5.0
Labour Co-op gain from Conservative		Swing	+11.3	

General election 1992: Corby
Party	Candidate	Votes	%	±%
Conservative	William Powell	25,203	44.5	+0.2
Labour	Harry Feather	24,861	43.9	+3.0
Liberal Democrats	Melvyn Roffe	5,792	10.2	−4.6
Liberal	Judith I. Wood	784	1.4	New
Majority		342	0.6	−2.8
Turnout		56,640	82.9	+3.3
Conservative hold		Swing	−1.4	

=== Elections in the 1980s ===
General election 1987: Corby
Party	Candidate	Votes	%	±%
Conservative	William Powell	23,323	44.3	+1.7
Labour	Harry Feather	21,518	40.9	+4.8
Liberal	Terrence Whittington	7,805	14.8	−5.5
Majority		1,805	3.4	−3.1
Turnout		52,646	79.6	+2.1
Conservative hold		Swing	−1.5	

General election 1983: Corby
Party	Candidate	Votes	%	±%
Conservative	William Powell	20,827	42.6	
Labour	William Homewood	17,659	36.1	
Liberal	Terrence Whittington	9,905	20.3	
Ecology	Rosy J. Stanning	505	1.0	
Majority		3,168	6.5	
Turnout		48,896	77.5	
Conservative win (new seat)				

== See also ==
- Parliamentary constituencies in Northamptonshire
