= Phil Hope =

British politician

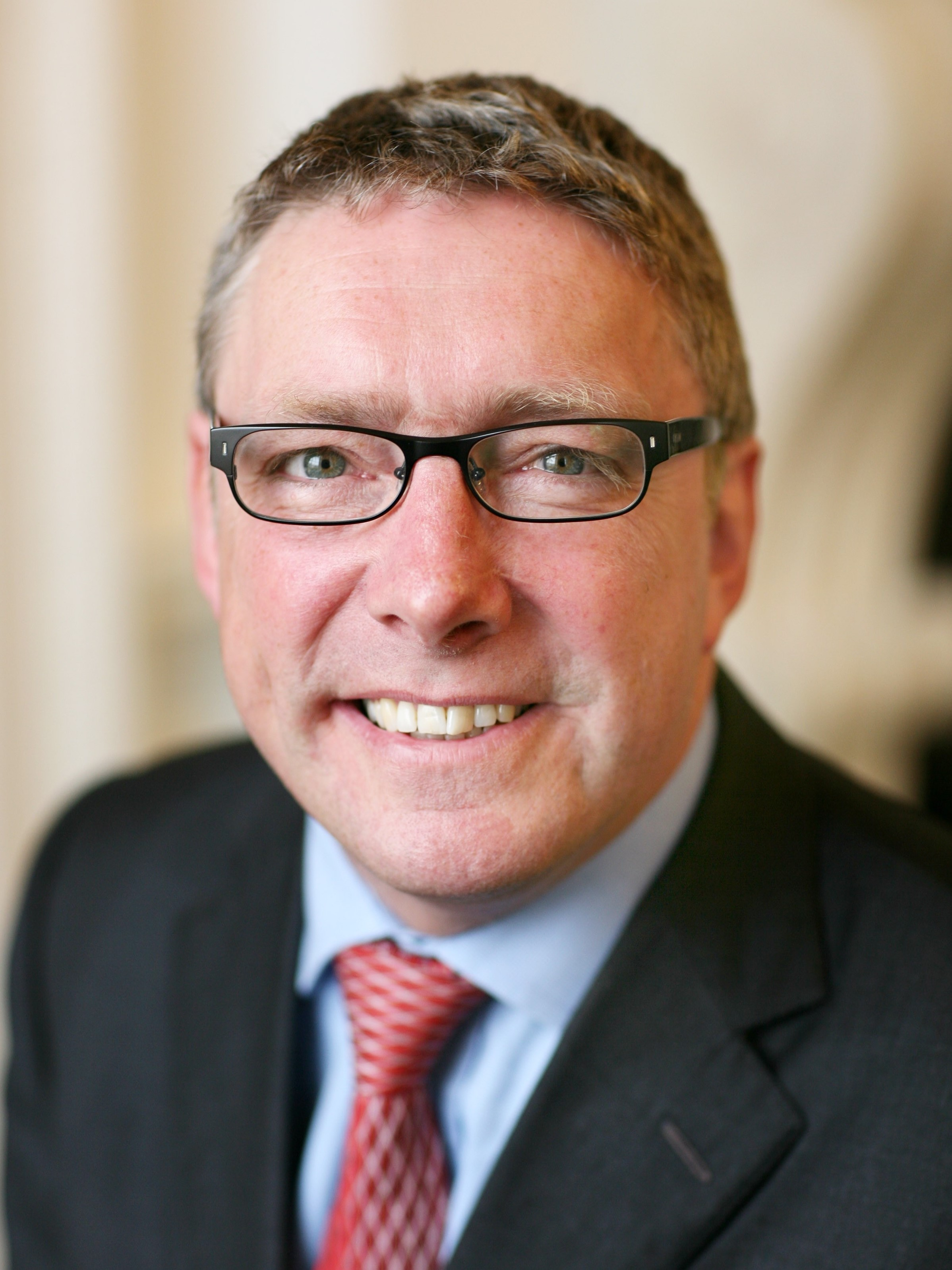
- Official portrait, c. 2008

Minister of State for Care Services
- In office 5 October 2008 – 11 May 2010
- Prime Minister: Gordon Brown
- Preceded by: Ivan Lewis
- Succeeded by: Paul Burstow

Minister for the East Midlands
- In office 24 January 2008 – 11 May 2010
- Prime Minister: Gordon Brown
- Preceded by: Gillian Merron
- Succeeded by: Office abolished

Minister for the Third Sector
- In office 28 June 2007 – 5 October 2008
- Prime Minister: Gordon Brown
- Preceded by: Ed Miliband
- Succeeded by: Kevin Brennan

Member of Parliament for Corby
- In office 1 May 1997 – 12 April 2010
- Preceded by: William Powell
- Succeeded by: Louise Mensch

Personal details
- Born: 19 April 1955 (age 71) Battersea, London, England
- Party: Labour and Co-operative
- Spouse: Allison Butt
- Education: University of Exeter

Philip Ian Hope (born 19 April 1955) is a former British Labour and Co-operative politician who was the member of parliament (MP) for Corby from 1997 until 2010, when he lost his seat to the Conservatives. He held several ministerial roles during his time as an MP. Since January 2011 he has been co-director of ImprovingCare.

== Early life ==
Phil Hope was born in Battersea, the son of A.G. Hope, a Metropolitan Police commander, and Grace Thorogood. He was educated at Wandsworth Comprehensive School (later John Archer School, now closed) in Southfields and St Lukes College, Exeter where he was awarded a BEd degree in 1978. On leaving university in Exeter, he taught science for a year at Kettering School for Boys, before joining the National Council for Voluntary Organisations in 1979 as a youth policy advisor. He was appointed as the head of the Young Volunteers Resource Unit at the National Youth Bureau in 1982, before becoming a management consultant from Framework in 1985, becoming the Director of the Framework in Print Publishing Co-operative.

== Parliamentary career ==
Hope joined the Labour Party in 1978, and the Co-operative party in 1982. He was elected as a councillor to the Kettering Borough Council in 1983, becoming the deputy Labour group leader in 1986, before leaving the council in 1987. He unsuccessfully contested Kettering at the 1992 General Election where he came second to the sitting Conservative Party transport minister Roger Freeman by 11,154 votes. He was elected to the Northamptonshire County Council in 1993, becoming the chairman of the Labour group in the same year, before standing down in 1997. He was elected to the House of Commons at the 1997 General Election for Corby, defeating the Conservative MP William Powell by 11,860 votes. He made his maiden speech on 14 May 1997. He remained the MP for Corby until the 2010 election when he was defeated by the Conservative candidate.

In parliament he was appointed as the parliamentary private secretary (PPS) to Nick Raynsford, the Minister of State at the former Department for the Environment, Transport and the Regions in 1999, and following the 2001 General Election he became the PPS to the Deputy Prime Minister John Prescott. He was promoted to the government of Tony Blair in 2003 as the Parliamentary Under Secretary of State, again under John Prescott, at the Office of the Deputy Prime Minister. He served as the Parliamentary Under Secretary at the Department for Education and Skills from the 2005 general election as the minister for vocational education until the department was disbanded in the reshuffle on 28 June 2007. He then moved to become Minister for the Third Sector, based in the Cabinet Office. Following a reshuffle on 24 January 2008 he took on additional responsibility as Minister for the East Midlands. He retained the latter role but moved from the Cabinet Office to become a Minister of State in the Department of Health following a reshuffle in October 2008.

=== Employment of children during university holidays ===
In 2008, following the Investigation and withdrawal of the whip from MP Derek Conway The Daily Telegraph revealed that Hope had 'admitted' employing his children, both Politics students, at unspecified times during university holidays. Hope was one of at least 177 MPs employing family members and the Independent Parliamentary Standards Authority report published 2 years later, whilst tightening the rules, confirmed that a member may employ one relative subject to general conditions relating to expenses.

=== Expenses controversy ===
In May 2009, Hope was criticised for claiming £37,000 in expenses from the taxpayer over 4 years for a London flat. The Daily Telegraph claimed that the total size of the items claimed for would have difficulty fitting inside the small flat. Less than a week after this revelation, Hope voluntarily agreed to return £41,709 to the taxpayer, despite claiming that he 'kept to the rules laid down by Parliament'. Following this announcement there were calls on other MPs to take Hope's lead, while the Legg Report into the scandal found that he was only liable to repay £4,365.65.

The overall cost of his flat, including refurbishing, i.e. 'staying away from main home' during the previous 8 years was 166th out of 647 MPs whilst his 2008-2009 costs were ranked 467.

== Personal life ==
He married Allison Butt on 25 July 1980 in Chipping Sodbury and they have a son (born February 1984) and a daughter (born September 1986). He once appeared on the 1970s television drama series Z-Cars and can also both tap dance and juggle. Diagnosed with Hodgkin's Disease in December 2006, Hope was later given the all-clear after successful treatment at Kettering and Northampton General Hospitals. He has been a governor of Park Junior School and Montagu Secondary School in Kettering.

Hope lived in the village of Pipewell near Kettering and now lives in Gloucestershire.

== Publications ==
- Ideas into Action: Handbook on Project Planning for Youth and Community Workers by Philip Hope, 1987, National Council for Voluntary Youth Services, ISBN 0-907518-29-X
- Making the Break: Choices and Decisions Facing Young People Leaving Home by Philip Hope, 1989, CVS Advisory Service, ISBN 0-907829-57-0
- Education for Citizenship: Resource Pack for Schools by Philip Hope, 1991, The Children's Society, ISBN 0-907324-59-2
- View to Learn by Philip Hope and Warren Feek, 1991, ITV and Channel Four Community Education
- Making Best Use of Consultants by Philip Hope, 1992, Financial Times Prentice Hall, ISBN 0-582-09824-6
- Diagnosis, Data Collection and Feedback in Consultancy by Philip Hope, 1994, Open University
- Education for Parenthood: A Resource Pack for Young People by Philip Hope, 1994, The Children's Society, ISBN 0-907324-75-4
- Analysis and Action on Youth Health by Philip Hope, 1995, Commonwealth Youth Programme
- Performance Appraisal: A Handbook for Managers in Public Organisations by Philip Hope and Tim Pickles, 1995, Russell House Press, ISBN 1-898924-45-7
- Tomorrow's Parents: Developing Parenthood Education in Schools by Philip Hope and Penny Sharland, 1997, Calouste Gulbenkian Foundation, ISBN 0-903319-79-9
- User Involvement by Philip Hope and Sarah Hargreaves, 1997, Framework in Print
- Education for Parenthood: A Resource Pack for Young People by Philip Hope, 1998, ISBN 1-899783-10-5

Parliament of the United Kingdom
Preceded by William Powell	Member of Parliament for Corby; 1997 – 2010	Succeeded by Louise Bagshawe
Preceded by Gillian Merron	Minister for the East Midlands; 2008–2010	Succeeded by Position Abolished
Preceded by Ivan Lewis	Minister of State for Health; 2008–2010	Succeeded by Simon Burns
