= Samuel Perry (MP) =

British politician (1877–1954)

Perry in 1920

Samuel Frederick Perry (29 June 1877 – 19 October 1954), was a Labour and Co-operative politician in the United Kingdom. He was the father of the British tennis and table tennis champion Fred Perry.

Born in Stockport, Cheshire, Sam Perry began his education with a scholarship at the Stockport Grammar School but was forced to give up school at the age of ten when his father died, becoming a cotton spinner like his father. He became involved in the local co-operative movement with the Stockport Co-operative Society then Birkenhead and on the creation of the Co-operative Party in 1917 was appointed its first national secretary.

Appointment as the senior official in the Party brought Perry to London with nine-year-old Fred. The family lived on the co-operatively run Brentham Estate in Ealing, where Fred was able to use the tennis courts and cricket pitch. Sam Perry unsuccessfully contested the 2-member Stockport constituency at a by-election in 1920 and again at the subsequent 1922 general election.

Perry was elected at the 1923 general election as Member of Parliament for Kettering in Northamptonshire, defeating the Conservative MP Owen Parker. He lost the seat at the 1924 election to the Conservative Sir Mervyn Manningham-Buller, and won it back at the 1929 election, but was defeated again at the 1931 general election by the Conservative John Eastwood.

Perry continued as national secretary of the Co-operative Party until 1942. He died in Willesden aged 77.

Party political offices
New title	National Secretary of the Co-operative Party; 1917 – 1942	Succeeded by Jack Bailey
Parliament of the United Kingdom
Preceded by Owen Parker	Member of Parliament for Kettering; 1923 – 1924	Succeeded by Sir Mervyn Manningham-Buller
Preceded by Sir Mervyn Manningham-Buller	Member of Parliament for Kettering; 1929 – 1931	Succeeded by John Eastwood
