= Local Government Information Unit =

UK think tank

The Local Government information Unit (LGiU) is a local government membership body, thinktank and registered charity. Established in 1983 as a membership organisation for UK local authorities, the LGiU states that its mission is to strengthen local democracy and put citizens in control of their own lives, communities and services. The LGiU has around 200 local authority members across the UK and Republic of Ireland and a wide range of associate members and partner organisations.

The Chief Executive is Jonathan Carr-West, formerly of the RSA. Andy Sawford was Chief Executive of the LGiU until 2012, when he was elected MP for Corby. The Chair of the Board is Councillor Michael Payne of Gedling Borough Council, Nottinghamshire. In July 2008 the LGiU was voted Thinktank of the Year in the Public Affairs News Awards.

The LGiU has released a number of publications on policy areas including devolution, localism, adult social care, public-private sector partnerships and the role of local authorities in the schools system. They also frequently publish policy briefings for members, as well as a daily news service. They run the Cllr Achievement Awards, which recognises achievement in local government.

The LGiU is Secretariat to the All-Party Parliamentary Group for Local Government, current chaired by Chris Clarkson, MP formerly chaired by Heather Wheeler MP.

The Centre for Public Service Partnerships (CPSP) and the Local Government Information Unit joined forces in January 2010, forming a unit known as CPSP @ LGiU. Writer John Tizard, formerly the CPSP's director, became the head of the new unit.

In September 2015, LGiU launched LGiU Scotland, a policy information service dedicated to local government across Scotland. In 2017, LGiU launched LGiU Ireland. In 2020, LGiU in collaboration with SGS Economics and Planning launched LGiU Australia.
