= Kettering (constituency) =

Parliamentary constituency in the United Kingdom, 1918 onwards

Coordinates: 52.42°N 0.75°W

- County constituency for the House of Commons
- Interactive map of boundaries since 2024
- Location within the East Midlands
- County: Northamptonshire
- Electorate: 76,163 (March 2020)
- Major settlements: Kettering, Desborough, Burton Latimer and Rothwell

Current constituency
- Created: 1918
- Member of Parliament: Rosie Wrighting (Labour)
- Seats: One
- Created from: North Northamptonshire and Mid Northamptonshire

Kettering is a constituency (Note: A county constituency (for the purposes of election expenses and type of returning officer)) in Northamptonshire represented in the House of Commons of the UK Parliament since 2024 by Rosie Wrighting of the Labour Party. (Note: As with all constituencies, the constituency elects one Member of Parliament (MP) by the first past the post system of election at least every five years.)

== Constituency profile ==
Kettering is a constituency in Northamptonshire based around the large town of Kettering, which has a population of around 67,000. The other towns in the constituency are Desborough, Burton Latimer and Rothwell. Kettering and the smaller towns have an industrial history, particularly in iron mining and shoemaking. The constituency has average levels of wealth; there is some deprivation in the centre of Kettering whilst the rest of the constituency is generally affluent, particularly so in Kettering's eastern suburbs. House prices across the constituency are similar to the rest of the East Midlands and lower than the national average.

In general, residents of the constituency have low levels of education but average rates of income and professional employment. A high proportion of residents work in healthcare, retail and manufacturing. White people made up 90% of the population at the 2021 census. At the local council, the town of Kettering is mostly represented by Green Party councillors, Burton Latimer and the east of the constituency elected Reform UK councillors and Desborough, Rothwell and the west of the constituency elected Conservatives. Voters in the constituency strongly supported leaving the European Union in the 2016 referendum; an estimated 61% voted in favour of Brexit compared to the nationwide figure of 52%.

== Electoral history ==
Prior to 1983, the constituency had been dominated not by the eponymous town, but by the nearby industrial town of Corby. The town's general support for Labour made Kettering a reliable Labour seat, as the party won it at every election from 1945 to when Corby was split off to form its own constituency in 1983. In its current configuration Kettering is much more inclined towards the Conservatives, though Labour won it in their landslide victories in 1997, 2001 and 2024.

== Boundaries ==
The constituency covers the major town of Kettering, the smaller towns of Desborough, Rothwell and Burton Latimer together with a number of villages. A semi-rural seat, the preponderance of constituents live in the towns and a minority of the wards form a wide array of rural communities that have civil parish or hamlet status.

=== Historic ===
1918–1950: The Urban Districts of Desborough, Kettering, and Rothwell, the Rural Districts of Brixworth, Kettering, and Oxendon, and in the Rural District of Northampton the parishes of Great Billing, Little Billing, and Weston Favell.

The constituency created in 1950 included the generally (in the late 20th century) Labour-majority industrial town of Corby until the 1983 general election, when Corby gained its own constituency.

1950–1974: The Municipal Borough of Kettering, the Urban Districts of Burton Latimer, Desborough, Corby and Rothwell, and the Rural Districts of Brixworth and Kettering.

1974–1983: The Municipal Borough of Kettering, the Urban Districts of Burton Latimer, Corby, Desborough, and Rothwell, and the Rural District of Kettering.

1983–1997: The Borough of Kettering, and the District of Daventry wards of Boughton and Pitsford, Brixworth, Clipston, Moulton, and Overstone and Walgrave.

1997–2010: The Borough of Kettering, and the District of Daventry wards of Boughton and Pitsford, Brixworth, Clipston, Guilsborough, Moulton, Overstone and Walgrave, Spratton, and Welford.

2010–2021: The Borough of Kettering.

The Boundary Commission's Fifth periodic review of Westminster constituencies proposed an additional seat in Northamptonshire due to population growth in the county. Parliament approved its recommendations for 2010 which made way for the new constituency of South Northamptonshire. The resulting boundary changes resulted in the loss of the District of Daventry wards from the Kettering constituency.

2021–2024: With effect from 1 April 2021, the Borough of Kettering was abolished and absorbed into the new unitary authority of North Northamptonshire. From that date, the constituency comprised the District of North Northamptonshire wards of Burton and Broughton, Clover Hill, Desborough, Ise, Northall, Rothwell and Mawsley, and Wicksteed and Windmill.

=== Current ===
Following the 2023 review of Westminster constituencies, which came into effect for the 2024 general election, the constituency was increased in size by transferring a small part of the Corby Rural ward (as it existed on 1 April 2021) from Corby and East Northamptonshire.

Further to a local government boundary review which came into effect in May 2025, the constituency now comprises the following wards of North Northamptonshire:

- Avondale Grange; Barton Seagrave and Burton Latimer; Desborough; Geddington and Stanion; Ise; Kettering Central; Kettering North; Pipers Hill; Rothwell and Mawsley; St Michael; St Peter.

== Members of Parliament ==
The current Member of Parliament is Rosie Wrighting of the Labour Party. She was elected in 2024 when she defeated the sitting Conservative MP, Philip Hollobone, in an election which nationally saw a landslide win for the Labour Party. Prior to Wrighting's victory, Kettering had been a predominantly safe Conservative seat since the removal of Corby in 1983, as Labour had only won it in their two landslides in 1997 and 2001, by tight margins of just 189 and 665 votes (0.3 and 1.2 percent of the vote) respectively. Her majority was by far the largest for Labour since before Corby was removed from the seat.

Election	Member	Party
1918	Alfred Waterson	Co-operative
1922	Owen Parker	Conservative
1923	Samuel Perry	Labour Co-operative
1924	Mervyn Manningham-Buller	Conservative
1929	Samuel Perry	Labour Co-operative
1931	John Eastwood	Conservative
1940 by-election	John Profumo	Conservative
1945	Gilbert Mitchison	Labour
1964	Geoffrey de Freitas	Labour
1979	Bill Homewood	Labour
1983	Roger Freeman	Conservative
1997	Phil Sawford	Labour
2005	Philip Hollobone	Conservative
2024	Rosie Wrighting	Labour

Mid Northamptonshire Constituency (1885–1918)

Prior to boundary changes in 1918, at least the majority of modern-day Kettering Constituency lay within the Mid Northamptonshire constituency.

North Northamptonshire Constituency (1832–1885)

Prior to boundary changes in 1885, at least the majority of modern-day Kettering Constituency lay within the North Northamptonshire constituency, which elected two members to Parliament.

== Elections ==
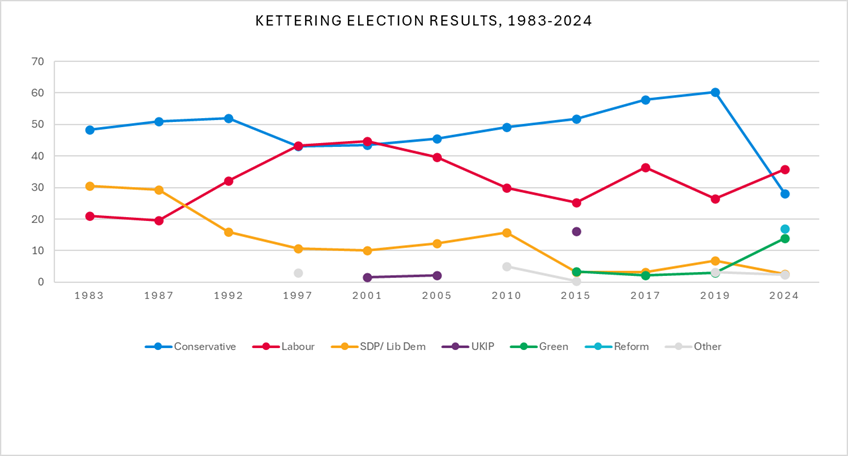
Kettering election results 1983-2024

=== Elections in the 2020s ===
General election 2024: Kettering
Party	Candidate	Votes	%	±%
Labour	Rosie Wrighting	18,009	35.9	+9.0
Conservative	Philip Hollobone	14,189	28.2	−32.1
Reform	Crispian Besley	8,468	16.9	N/A
Green	Emily Fedorowycz	7,004	13.9	+10.9
Liberal Democrats	Sarah Ryan	1,357	2.7	−4.0
Independent	Jim Hakewill	1,057	2.1	−1.1
SDP	Matthew Murphy	85	0.2	N/A
ADF	Jehad Aburamadan	62	0.1	N/A
Majority		3,820	7.7	N/A
Turnout		50,231	63.3	−5.0
Registered electors		79,390		
Labour gain from Conservative		Swing	+20.6	

=== Elections in the 2010s ===
General election 2019: Kettering
Party	Candidate	Votes	%	±%
Conservative	Philip Hollobone	29,787	60.3	▲2.4
Labour	Clare Pavitt	13,022	26.4	▼10.1
Liberal Democrats	Chris Nelson	3,367	6.8	▲3.5
Independent	Jim Hakewill	1,642	3.3	New
Green	Jamie Wildman	1,543	3.1	▲0.8
Majority		16,765	33.9	▲12.5
Turnout		49,361	67.4	▼1.7
Conservative hold		Swing	▲6.25	

General election 2017: Kettering
Party	Candidate	Votes	%	±%
Conservative	Philip Hollobone	28,616	57.9	▲6.1
Labour	Mick Scrimshaw	18,054	36.5	▲11.3
Liberal Democrats	Suzanna Austin	1,618	3.3	▲0.1
Green	Rob Reeves	1,116	2.3	▼1.2
Majority		10,562	21.4	▼5.2
Turnout		49,404	69.1	▲1.8
Conservative hold		Swing	▼2.6	

General election 2015: Kettering
Party	Candidate	Votes	%	±%
Conservative	Philip Hollobone	24,467	51.8	+2.7
Labour	Rhea Keehn	11,877	25.2	−4.7
UKIP	Jonathan Bullock	7,600	16.1	New
Green	Rob Reeves	1,633	3.5	New
Liberal Democrats	Chris McGlynn	1,490	3.2	−12.6
English Democrat	Derek Hilling	151	0.3	−1.7
Majority		12,590	26.6	+7.4
Turnout		47,218	67.3	−1.5
Conservative hold		Swing	+3.75	

General election 2010: Kettering
Party	Candidate	Votes	%	±%
Conservative	Philip Hollobone	23,247	49.1	+6.2
Labour	Phil Sawford	14,153	29.9	−12.7
Liberal Democrats	Chris Nelson	7,498	15.8	+3.6
BNP	Clive Skinner	1,366	2.9	New
English Democrat	Derek Hilling	952	2.0	New
Bus-Pass Elvis	Dave Bishop	112	0.2	New
Majority		9,094	19.2	+13.2
Turnout		47,328	68.8	−0.4
Conservative hold		Swing	+9.4	

=== Elections in the 2000s ===
General election 2005: Kettering
Party	Candidate	Votes	%	±%
Conservative	Philip Hollobone	25,401	45.6	+2.1
Labour	Phil Sawford	22,100	39.7	−5.0
Liberal Democrats	Roger Aron	6,882	12.4	+2.2
UKIP	Rosemarie Clarke	1,263	2.3	+0.6
Majority		3,301	5.9	N/A
Turnout		55,646	68.0	−0.1
Conservative gain from Labour		Swing	+3.55	

General election 2001: Kettering
Party	Candidate	Votes	%	±%
Labour	Phil Sawford	24,034	44.7	+1.4
Conservative	Philip Hollobone	23,369	43.5	+0.5
Liberal Democrats	Roger Aron	5,469	10.2	−0.5
UKIP	Barry Mahoney	880	1.6	New
Majority		665	1.2	+0.9
Turnout		53,752	68.1	−7.4
Labour hold		Swing	+0.45	

=== Elections in the 1990s ===
General election 1997: Kettering
Party	Candidate	Votes	%	±%
Labour	Phil Sawford	24,650	43.3	+11.4
Conservative	Roger Freeman	24,461	43.0	−9.8
Liberal Democrats	Roger Aron	6,098	10.7	−4.7
Referendum	Arthur Smith	1551	2.7	New
Natural Law	Rosemary le Carpentier	197	0.3	New
Majority		189	0.3	N/A
Turnout		56,957	75.5	−7.4
Labour gain from Conservative		Swing	+9.9	

General election 1992: Kettering
Party	Candidate	Votes	%	±%
Conservative	Roger Freeman	29,115	52.0	+0.9
Labour Co-op	Phil Hope	17,961	32.1	+12.4
Liberal Democrats	Richard Denton-White	8,962	16.0	−13.3
Majority		11,154	19.9	−1.8
Turnout		56,038	82.6	+3.8
Conservative hold		Swing	−5.7	

=== Elections in the 1980s ===
General election 1987: Kettering
Party	Candidate	Votes	%	±%
Conservative	Roger Freeman	26,532	51.0	+2.6
SDP	Celia Goodhart	15,205	29.3	−1.2
Labour	Ashley Minto	10,229	19.7	−1.4
Majority		11,327	21.7	+3.8
Turnout		51,196	78.8	+2.4
Conservative hold		Swing		

General election 1983: Kettering
Party	Candidate	Votes	%	±%
Conservative	Roger Freeman	23,223	48.4	−0.2
SDP	Celia Goodhart	14,637	30.5	+18.4
Labour	Alex Gordon	10,119	21.1	−18.3
Majority		8,586	17.9	N/A
Turnout		47,979	76.4	−2.9
Conservative win (new boundaries)				

Note: The boundary changes to the seat for the 1983 election meant that this seat would have been won by the Conservatives in 1979, as parts of the seat were moved into the newly created seat of Corby which was notionally Labour on the new boundaries and thus saw William Homewood attempt (albeit unsuccessfully) to seek re-election there.

=== Elections in the 1970s ===
General election 1979: Kettering
Party	Candidate	Votes	%	±%
Labour	William Homewood	31,579	45.0	−4.3
Conservative	Rupert Allason	30,101	42.9	+11.4
Liberal	G. Raven	8,424	12.0	−7.2
Majority		1,478	2.1	−15.7
Turnout		70,104	79.3	+6.1
Labour hold		Swing	-7.9	

General election October 1974: Kettering
Party	Candidate	Votes	%	±%
Labour	Geoffrey de Freitas	30,970	49.3	+3.4
Conservative	G.D. Reed	19,800	31.5	−0.2
Liberal	A. James W. Haigh	12,038	19.2	−3.1
Majority		11,170	17.8	+3.6
Turnout		62,808	73.2	−7.9
Labour hold		Swing		

General election February 1974: Kettering
Party	Candidate	Votes	%	±%
Labour	Geoffrey de Freitas	31,659	45.9	−2.3
Conservative	G.D. Reed	21,872	31.7	−10.7
Liberal	A. James W. Haigh	15,393	22.3	+13.0
Majority		9,787	14.2	+8.4
Turnout		68,924	81.1	+5.6
Labour hold		Swing		

General election 1970: Kettering
Party	Candidate	Votes	%	±%
Labour	Geoffrey de Freitas	34,803	48.3	−4.3
Conservative	John Charles Taylor	30,613	42.5	+6.9
Liberal	A. James W. Haigh	6,695	9.3	−2.5
Majority		4,190	5.8	−11.2
Turnout		72,111	75.5	−5.8
Labour hold		Swing		

=== Elections in the 1960s ===
General election 1966: Kettering
Party	Candidate	Votes	%	±%
Labour	Geoffrey de Freitas	35,337	52.6	−2.6
Conservative	Trevor E.T. Weston	23,877	35.6	−9.2
Liberal	Anthony Smith	7,903	11.8	New
Majority		11,460	17.0	+6.6
Turnout		67,117	81.3	−0.2
Labour hold		Swing		

General election 1964: Kettering
Party	Candidate	Votes	%	±%
Labour	Geoffrey de Freitas	36,210	55.2	+2.4
Conservative	J. Hedley Lewis	29,405	44.8	−2.4
Majority		6,805	10.4	+2.4
Turnout		65,615	81.5	+4.0
Labour hold		Swing		

=== Elections in the 1950s ===
General election 1959: Kettering
Party	Candidate	Votes	%	±%
Labour	Dick Mitchison	32,933	52.8	−2.4
Conservative	Neil Stone	29,448	47.2	2.4
Majority		3,485	5.6	−4.8
Turnout		62,381	77.5	−4.1
Labour hold		Swing		

General election 1955: Kettering
Party	Candidate	Votes	%	±%
Labour	Dick Mitchison	31,198	55.2	−0.6
Conservative	John F. Nash	25,495	44.8	+0.6
Majority		5,903	10.4	−1.2
Turnout		56,893	81.6	−5.6
Labour hold		Swing		

General election 1951: Kettering
Party	Candidate	Votes	%	±%
Labour	Dick Mitchison	32,604	55.8	+3.2
Conservative	C. Peter B. Bailey	25,777	44.2	+5.6
Majority		6,827	11.6	−2.4
Turnout		58,381	87.2	−0.9
Labour hold		Swing		

General election 1950: Kettering
Party	Candidate	Votes	%	±%
Labour	Dick Mitchison	30,243	52.6	−1.0
Conservative	Gyles Isham	22,169	38.6	−3.5
Liberal	Ian Morrow	4,692	8.2	New
Communist	L.P. O'Connor	368	0.6	New
Majority		8,074	14.0	+2.5
Turnout		57,472	88.1	+13.0
Labour hold		Swing		

=== Elections in the 1940s ===
General election 1945: Kettering
Party	Candidate	Votes	%	±%
Labour	Dick Mitchison	29,868	53.6	+5.7
Conservative	John Profumo	23,424	42.1	−10.0
Christian Pacifist Party	John Chamberlain Dempsey	2,381	4.3	New
Majority		6,444	11.5	N/A
Turnout		24,530	75.1	−2.2
Labour gain from Conservative		Swing		

The British Council commissioned a short film on the 1945 general election which portrays the contest in the Kettering constituency.

1940 Kettering by-election
Party	Candidate	Votes	%	±%
Conservative	John Profumo	17,914	73.0	+20.9
Workers' and Pensioners' Anti-War	W. Ross	6,616	27.0	New
Majority		11,298	46.0	+41.8
Turnout		24,530	37.8	−39.5
Conservative hold		Swing		

=== Elections in the 1930s ===
General election 1935: Kettering
Party	Candidate	Votes	%	±%
Conservative	John Eastwood	22,885	52.1	−8.1
Labour Co-op	J.R. Sadler	21,042	47.9	+8.1
Majority		1,843	4.2	−16.1
Turnout		43,927	77.3	−8.4
Conservative hold		Swing		

General election 1931: Kettering
Party	Candidate	Votes	%	±%
Conservative	John Eastwood	25,811	60.2	+23.1
Labour Co-op	Samuel Perry	17,095	39.8	−4.0
Majority		8,716	20.3	N/A
Turnout		42,906	85.7	−0.1
Conservative gain from Labour		Swing		

=== Elections in the 1920s ===
General election 1929: Kettering
Party	Candidate	Votes	%	±%
Labour Co-op	Samuel Perry	18,253	43.8	−4.2
Unionist	J. Brown	15,469	37.1	−14.9
Liberal	Cuthbert Snowball Rewcastle	7,972	19.1	New
Majority		2,784	6.7	N/A
Turnout		41,694	85.8	+1.5
Registered electors		48,588		
Labour Co-op gain from Unionist		Swing	+5.4	

General election 1924: Kettering
Party	Candidate	Votes	%	±%
Unionist	Mervyn Manningham-Buller	16,042	52.0	+17.0
Labour Co-op	Samuel Perry	14,801	48.0	+4.5
Majority		1,241	4.0	N/A
Turnout		30,843	84.3	+3.0
Registered electors		36,574		
Unionist gain from Labour Co-op		Swing	+6.3	

General election 1923: Kettering
Party	Candidate	Votes	%	±%
Labour Co-op	Samuel Perry	12,718	43.5	−6.0
Unionist	Owen Parker	10,212	35.0	−15.5
Liberal	Alfred Yeo	6,273	21.5	New
Majority		2,506	8.5	N/A
Turnout		29,203	81.3	+0.3
Registered electors		35,899		
Labour Co-op gain from Unionist		Swing	+4.8	

General election 1922: Kettering
Party	Candidate	Votes	%	±%
Unionist	Owen Parker	14,333	50.5	New
Labour Co-op	Alfred Waterson	14,024	49.5	+1.8
Majority		309	1.0	N/A
Turnout		28,357	81.0	+15.9
Registered electors		35,024		
Unionist gain from Co-operative Party		Swing		

=== Elections in the 1910s ===
General election 1918: Kettering
Party		Candidate	Votes	%	±%
	Co-operative Party	Alfred Waterson	10,299	45.7	
C	Liberal	Leland William Buxton	7,761	34.4	
	National	Algernon Ferguson	4,489	19.9	
Majority			2,538	11.3	
Turnout			22,549	65.1	
Registered electors			34,624		
	Co-operative Party win (new seat)				
C indicates candidate endorsed by the coalition government.

== See also ==
- 1940 Kettering by-election
- List of parliamentary constituencies in Northamptonshire

== Sources ==
- Craig, F. W. S. (1983) [1969]. British parliamentary election results 1918–1949 (3rd ed.). Chichester: Parliamentary Research Services. ISBN 0-900178-06-X.
