= List of MPs who lost their seat in the 1997 United Kingdom general election =

This is a list of MPs who lost their seat at the 1997 general election. In total, 133 MPs lost their seats, with some Conservative MPs being defeated by female Labour MPs.

== List ==
Party	Name	Constituency	Office held whilst in power	Year elected	Defeated by	Party
Conservative Party	Raymond Robertson	Aberdeen South		1992	Anne Begg	Labour Party
Conservative Party	George Kynoch	Kincardine and Deeside, contesting West Aberdeenshire and Kincardine	Under-Secretary of State for Scotland (1995–1997)	1992	Robert Smith	Liberal Democrats
Conservative Party	Phillip Oppenheim	Amber Valley	Exchequer Secretary to the Treasury (1996–1997)	1983	Judy Mallaber	Labour Party
Conservative Party	Phil Gallie	Ayr		1992	Sandra Osborne	Labour Party
Conservative Party	Elizabeth Peacock	Batley and Spen		1983	Mike Wood	Labour Party
Conservative Party	John Bowis	Battersea	Parliamentary Under-Secretary of state for Transport (1996-1997)	1987	Martin Linton	Labour Party
Conservative Party	David Evennett	Erith and Crayford, contesting Bexleyheath and Crayford		1983	Nigel Beard	Labour Party
Conservative Party	Andrew Hargreaves	Birmingham Hall Green		1987	Steve McCabe	Labour Party
Conservative Party	Harold Elletson	Blackpool North, contesting Blackpool North and Fleetwood		1992	Joan Humble	Labour Party
Conservative Party	Tom Sackville	Bolton West	Parliamentary Under-Secretary of State for the Home Office (1995-1997)	1983	Ruth Kelly	Labour Party
Conservative Party	Tony Newton	Braintree	Leader of the House of Commons and Lord President of the Council (1992-1997)	1974	Alan Hurst	Labour Party
Conservative Party	Jonathan Evans	Brecon and Radnorshire	Parliamentary Under-Secretary of State for Wales (1996-1997)	1992	Richard Livsey	Liberal Democrats
Conservative Party	Rhodes Boyson	Brent North	Minister of State for Local Government (1986-1987)	1974	Barry Gardiner	Labour Party
Conservative Party	Nirj Deva	Brentford and Isleworth		1992	Ann Keen	Labour Party
Conservative Party	Andrew Bowden	Brighton Kemptown		1970	Des Turner	Labour Party
Conservative Party	Derek Spencer	Brighton Pavilion	Solicitor General for England and Wales (1992-1997)	1992	David Lepper	Labour Party
Conservative Party	Michael Stern	Bristol North West		1983	Doug Naysmith	Labour Party
Conservative Party	William Waldegrave	Bristol West	Chief Secretary to the Treasury (1995-1997)	1979	Valerie Davey	Labour Party
Conservative Party	Jim Lester	Broxtowe		1974	Nick Palmer	Labour Party
Conservative Party	Ivan Lawrence	Burton	Chairman of the Home Affairs Select Committee (1992-1997)	1974	Janet Dean	Labour Party
Conservative Party	Alistair Burt	Bury North	Minister of State for the Department of Social Security (1995-1997)	1983	David Chaytor	Labour Party
Conservative Party	David Sumberg	Bury South		1983	Ivan Lewis	Labour Party
Conservative Party	Donald Thompson	Calder Valley		1979	Christine McCafferty	Labour Party
Conservative Party	Gwilym Jones	Cardiff North	Parliamentary Under-Secretary of State for Wales (1994-1997)	1983	Julie Morgan	Labour Party
Conservative Party	Nigel Forman	Carshalton and Wallington	Minister of Higher Education (1992)	1976	Tom Brake	Liberal Democrats (UK)
Conservative Party	Bob Spink	Castle Point		1992	Christine Butler	Labour Party
Conservative Party	Gyles Brandreth	City of Chester	Lord Commissioner of the Treasury (1996-1997)	1992	Christine Russell	Labour Party
Conservative Party	Den Dover	Chorley		1979	Lindsay Hoyle	Labour Party
Conservative Party	Michael Brown	Brigg and Cleethorpes, contesting Cleethorpes		1979	Shona McIsaac	Labour Party
Conservative Party	Rod Richards	Clwyd North West, contesting Clwyd West	Under-Secretary of State for Wales (1994-1996)	1992	Gareth Thomas	Labour Party
Conservative Party	Graham Riddick	Colne Valley		1987	Kali Mountford	Labour Party
Conservative Party	William Powell	Corby		1983	Phil Hope	Labour Party
Conservative Party	Malcolm Thornton	Crosby		1979	Claire Curtis-Thomas	Labour Party
Conservative Party	David Congdon	Croydon North East, contesting Croydon Central		1992	Geraint Davies	Labour Party
Conservative Party	Bob Dunn	Dartford		1979	Howard Stoate	Labour Party
Conservative Party	Greg Knight	Derby North	Minister of State for Industry (1996-1997)	1983	Bob Laxton	Labour Party
Conservative Party	Edwina Currie	South Derbyshire	Parliamentary Under-Secretary of State for Health (1986-1988)	1983	Mark Todd	Labour Party
Conservative Party	David Shaw	Dover		1987	Gwyn Prosser	Labour Party
Conservative Party	Harry Greenway	Ealing North		1979	Stephen Pound	Labour Party
Conservative Party	Malcolm Rifkind	Edinburgh Pentlands	Foreign Secretary (1995-1997)	1974	Lynda Clark	Labour Party
Conservative Party	James Douglas-Hamilton	Edinburgh West	Minister of State for Scotland (1995-1997)	1974	Donald Gorrie	Liberal Democrats (UK)
Conservative Party	Ian Twinn	Edmonton		1983	Andy Love	Labour Party
Conservative Party	Spencer Batiste	Elmet		1983	Colin Burgon	Labour Party
Conservative Party	Michael Portillo	Enfield Southgate	Secretary of State for Defence (1995-1997)	1984	Stephen Twigg	Labour Party
Conservative Party	Angela Knight	Erewash	Economic Secretary to the Treasury (1995-1997)	1992	Liz Blackman	Labour Party
Conservative Party	Sebastian Coe	Falmouth and Camborne		1992	Candy Atherton	Labour Party
Conservative Party	John Marshall	Hendon South, contesting Finchley and Golders Green		1987	Rudi Vis	Labour Party
Conservative Party	Paul Marland	West Gloucestershire, contesting Forest of Dean	Chairman of the Home Agriculture Committee (1989-1997)	1979	Diana Organ	Labour Party
Conservative Party	Ian Lang	Galloway and Upper Nithsdale	President of the Board of Trade and Secretary of State for Trade & Industry (1995-1997)	1979	Alasdair Morgan	Scottish National Party
Conservative Party	Andrew Mitchell	Gedling	Parliamentary Under-Secretary of State for Social Security (1995-1997)	1987	Vernon Coaker	Labour Party
Conservative Party	James Couchman	Gillingham		1983	Paul Clark	Labour Party
Conservative Party	Douglas French	Gloucester		1987	Tess Kingham	Labour Party
Conservative Party	Jacques Arnold	Gravesham		1987	Chris Pond	Labour Party
Conservative Party	Michael Carttiss	Great Yarmouth		1983	Anthony Wright	Labour Party
Conservative Party	Matthew Carrington	Fulham, contesting Hammersmith and Fulham		1987	Iain Coleman	Labour Party
Conservative Party	Jerry Hayes	Harlow		1983	Bill Rammell	Labour Party
Conservative Party	Norman Lamont	Kingston-upon-Thames, contesting Harrogate and Knaresborough	Chancellor of the Exchequer (1990-1993)	1972	Phil Willis	Liberal Democrats
Conservative Party	Hugh Dykes	Harrow East		1970	Tony McNulty	Labour Party
Conservative Party	Robert Hughes	Harrow West		1987	Gareth Thomas	Labour Party
Conservative Party	Iain Sproat	Harwich	Minister for Sport (1993-1997)	1992	Ivan Henderson	Labour Party
Conservative Party	Jacqui Lait	Hastings and Rye	Assistant Whip (1996-1997)	1992	Michael Foster	Labour Party
Conservative Party	Robert Jones	West Hertfordshire, contesting Hemel Hempstead	Minister of State for Construction (1995-1997)	1983	Tony McWalter	Labour Party
Conservative Party	John Gorst	Hendon North, contesting Hendon		1970	Andrew Dismore	Labour Party
Conservative Party	Colin Shepherd	Hereford		1974	Paul Keetch	Liberal Democrats (UK)
Conservative Party	Charles Hendry	High Peak		1992	Tom Levitt	Labour Party
Conservative Party	Robin Squire	Hornchurch	Parliamentary Under-Secretary of State for Education (1995-1997)	1979	John Cryer	Labour Party
Conservative Party	Vivian Bendall	Ilford North		1978	Linda Perham	Labour Party
Conservative Party	Gary Waller	Keighley		1979	Ann Cryer	Labour Party
Conservative Party	Roger Freeman	Kettering	Chancellor of the Duchy of Lancaster (1995-1997)	1983	Phil Sawford	Labour Party
Conservative Party	Richard Tracey	Surbiton, contesting Kingston and Surbiton	Minister for Sport (1985-1987)	1983	Ed Davey	Liberal Democrats
Conservative Party	Keith Mans	Wyre, contesting Lancaster and Wyre		1987	Hilton Dawson	Labour Party
Conservative Party	Timothy Kirkhope	Leeds North East	Under-Secretary of State at the Home Office (1995-1997)	1987	Fabian Hamilton	Labour Party
Conservative Party	Keith Hampson	Leeds North West		1974	Harold Best	Labour Party
Conservative Party	Tim Rathbone	Lewes		1974	Norman Baker	Liberal Democrats
Conservative Party	Graham Bright	Luton South		1979	Margaret Moran	Labour Party
Conservative Party	Peggy Fenner	Medway		1979	Bob Marshall-Andrews	Labour Party
Conservative Party	Michael Bates	Langbaurgh, contesting Middlesbrough South and East Cleveland	Paymaster General (1996-1997)	1992	Ashok Kumar	Labour Party
Conservative Party	Barry Legg	Milton Keynes South West		1992	Phyllis Starkey	Labour Party
Conservative Party	Angela Rumbold	Mitcham and Morden		1982	Siobhain McDonagh	Labour Party
Conservative Party	Roger Evans	Monmouth	Parliamentary Under-Secretary of State for Social Security (1994-1997)	1992	Huw Edwards	Labour Party
Conservative Party	Mark Lennox-Boyd	Morecambe and Lunesdale	Parliamentary Under-Secretary for the Foreign Office (1990-1994)	1979	Geraldine Smith	Labour Party
Conservative Party	Richard Alexander	Newark		1979	Fiona Jones	Labour Party
Conservative Party	Peter Butler	North East Milton Keynes		1992	Brian White	Labour Party
Conservative Party	Bill Walker	Tayside North		1979	John Swinney	Scottish National Party
Conservative Party	Henry Bellingham	North West Norfolk		1983	George Turner	Labour Party
Conservative Party	Tony Marlow	Northampton North		1979	Sally Keeble	Labour Party
Conservative Party	Michael Morris	Northampton South	Chairman of Ways and Means (1992-1997)	1974	Tony Clarke	Labour Party
Conservative Party	John Cope	Northavon	Paymaster General (1992-1994)	1974	Steve Webb	Liberal Democrats
Conservative Party	Peter Griffiths	Portsmouth North		1979	Syd Rapson	Labour Party
Conservative Party	David Martin	Portsmouth South		1987	Mike Hancock	Liberal Democrats
Conservative Party	David Mellor	Putney	Secretary of State for National Heritage (1992)	1979	Tony Colman	Labour Party
Conservative Party	John Watts	Slough, contesting Reading East	Minister of State for Transport (1994-1997)	1983	Jane Griffiths	Labour Party
Conservative Party	Jeremy Hanley	Richmond and Barnes, contesting Richmond Park	Minister of State for Foreign and Commonwealth Affairs (1995-1997)	1983	Jenny Tonge	Liberal Democrats
Conservative Party	Michael Neubert	Romford	Under-Secretary of State for the Armed Forces (1988-1990)	1974	Eileen Gordon	Labour Party
Conservative Party	Jim Pawsey	Rugby and Kenilworth		1979	Andy King	Labour Party
Conservative Party	John Sykes	Scarborough, contesting Scarborough and Whitby		1992	Lawrie Quinn	Labour Party
Conservative Party	Irvine Patnick	Sheffield Hallam	Lord Commissioner of the Treasury (1990-1994)	1987	Richard Allan	Liberal Democrats
Conservative Party	Marcus Fox	Shipley	Chairman of the 1922 Committee (1992-1997)	1970	Chris Leslie	Labour Party
Conservative Party	Derek Conway	Shrewsbury and Atcham	Vice-Chamberlain of the Household (1996-1997)	1983	Paul Marsden	Labour Party
Conservative Party	Roger Moate	Faversham, contesting Sittingbourne and Sheppey		1970	Derek Wyatt	Labour Party
Conservative Party	Mark Robinson	Somerton and Frome	Parliamentary Under-Secretary of State for Wales (1985-1987)	1992	David Heath	Liberal Democrats
Conservative Party	Robert Atkins	South Ribble	Minister of State for Environment and Countryside (1994-1995)	1979	David Borrow	Labour Party
Conservative Party	Simon Coombs	Swindon, contesting Swindon South		1983	Julia Drown	Labour Party
Conservative Party	Jonathan Aitken	South Thanet	Chief Secretary to the Treasury (1994-1995)	1974	Stephen Ladyman	Labour Party
Conservative Party	James Hill	Southampton Test		1979	Alan Whitehead	Labour Party
Conservative Party	Matthew Gordon-Banks	Southport		1992	Ronnie Fearn	Liberal Democrats
Conservative Party	Timothy Wood	Stevenage	Comptroller of the Household (1995-1997)	1983	Barbara Follett	Labour Party
Conservative Party	Michael Forsyth	Stirling	Secretary of State for Scotland (1995-1997)	1983	Anne McGuire	Labour Party
Conservative Party	Tim Devlin	Stockton South		1987	Dari Taylor	Labour Party
Conservative Party	Warren Hawksley	Halesowen and Stourbridge, contesting Stourbridge		1992	Debra Shipley	Labour Party
Conservative Party	Roger Knapman	Stroud	Lord Commissioner of the Treasury (1996-1997)	1987	David Drew	Labour Party
Conservative Party	Olga Maitland	Sutton and Cheam		1992	Paul Burstow	Liberal Democrats
Conservative Party	Neil Hamilton	Tatton	Parliamentary Under-Secretary of State for Corporate Affairs (1992-1994)	1983	Martin Bell	Independent
Conservative Party	David Nicholson	Taunton		1987	Jackie Ballard	Liberal Democrats
Conservative Party	Rupert Allason	Torbay		1987	Adrian Sanders	Liberal Democrats
Conservative Party	Toby Jessel	Twickenham		1970	Vince Cable	Liberal Democrats
Conservative Party	Nicholas Bonsor	Upminster	Minister of State for Foreign Affairs (1995-1997)	1979	Keith Darvill	Labour Party
Conservative Party	Walter Sweeney	Vale of Glamorgan		1992	John Smith	Labour Party
Conservative Party	Dudley Smith	Warwick and Leamington	Parliamentary Under-Secretary of State for Employment (1970-1974)	1968	James Plaskitt	Labour Party
Conservative Party	David Porter	Waveney		1987	Bob Blizzard	Labour Party
Conservative Party	Peter Fry	Wellingborough		1969	Paul Stinchcombe	Labour Party
Conservative Party	David Evans	Welwyn Hatfield		1987	Melanie Johnson	Labour Party
Conservative Party	Charles Goodson-Wickes	Wimbledon		1987	Roger Casale	Labour Party
Conservative Party	Gerry Malone	Winchester		1992	Mark Oaten	Liberal Democrats
Conservative Party	David Hunt	Wirral West	Secretary of State for Wales (1995)	1976	Stephen Hesford	Labour Party
Conservative Party	Nicholas Budgen	Wolverhampton South West		1974	Jenny Jones	Labour Party
Conservative Party	Anthony Coombs	Wyre Forest		1987	David Lock	Labour Party
Liberal Democrats	Diana Maddock	Christchurch		1993	Christopher Chope	Conservative Party
Liberal Democrats	Chris Davies	Littleborough and Saddleworth, contesting Oldham East and Saddleworth		1995	Phil Woolas	Labour Party
Liberal Democrats	Liz Lynne	Rochdale		1992	Lorna Fitzsimons	Labour Party
Social Democratic and Labour Party	Joe Hendron	Belfast West		1992	Gerry Adams	Sinn Féin
Democratic Unionist Party	William McCrea	Mid Ulster		1983	Martin McGuinness	Sinn Féin
Referendum Party	George Gardiner	Reigate		1974	Crispin Blunt	Conservative Party
