= Peter Bone =

British politician (born 1952)

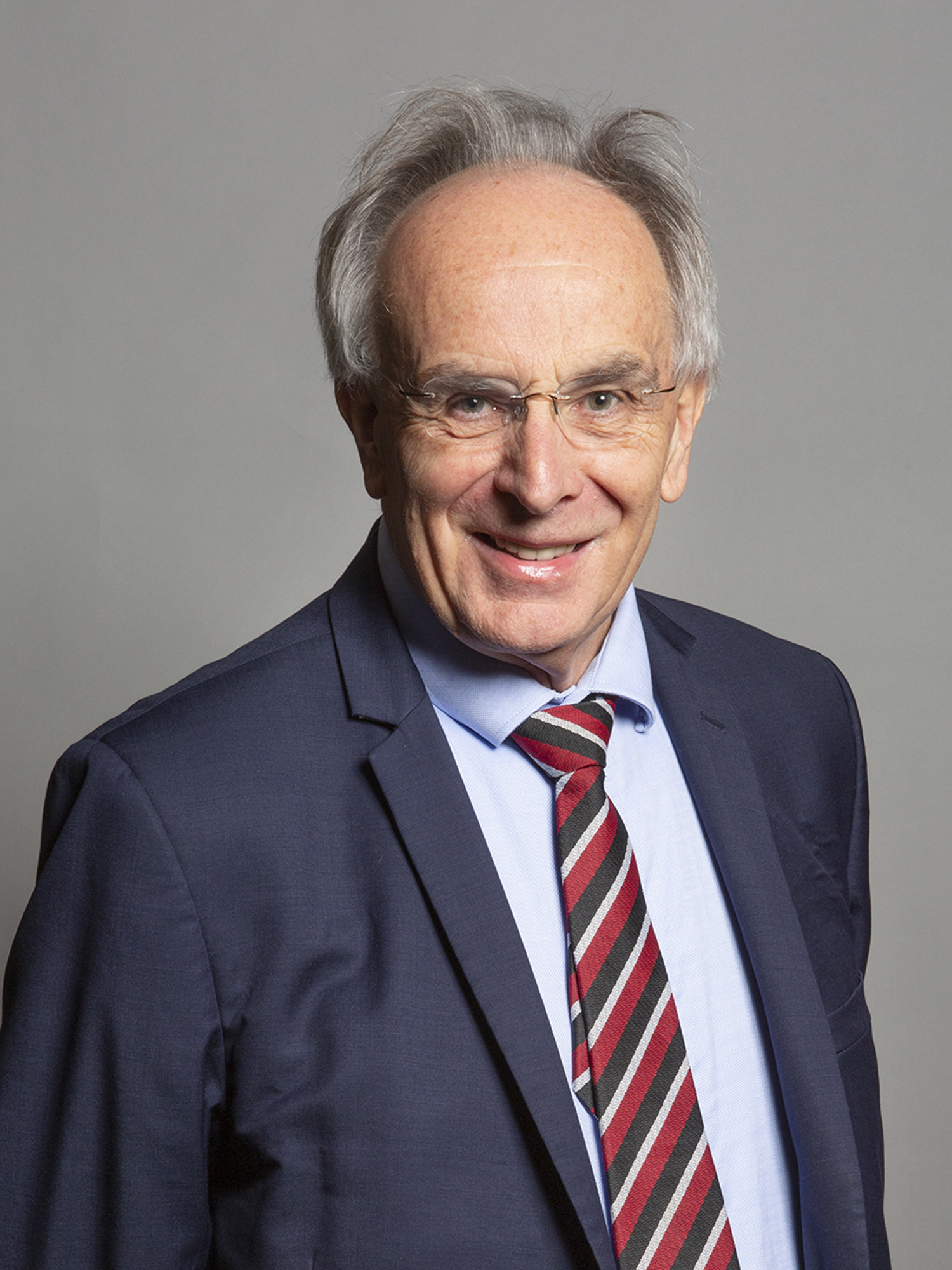
- Official portrait, 2019

Deputy Leader of the House of Commons
- In office 8 July 2022 – 27 September 2022
- Prime Minister: Boris Johnson; Liz Truss
- Preceded by: Mark Spencer (2019)
- Succeeded by: Vacant

Member of Parliament for Wellingborough
- In office 5 May 2005 – 19 December 2023
- Preceded by: Paul Stinchcombe
- Succeeded by: Gen Kitchen

Personal details
- Born: Peter William Bone; 19 October 1952 (age 73) Billericay, Essex, England
- Party: Conservative
- Spouse: Jeanette Sweeney (m. 1981; sep. 2016)
- Children: 3
- Education: Westcliff High School for Boys
- Profession: Accountant

Peter William Bone FCA (born 19 October 1952) is a British former politician who was the Member of Parliament (MP) for Wellingborough from 2005 until his removal in 2023. A member of the Conservative Party, he had sat as an independent in the House of Commons after the Conservative whip was withdrawn from him in 2023. He campaigned for Brexit in the EU referendum and was part of the political advisory board of Leave Means Leave. From July to September 2022, he served as Deputy Leader of the House of Commons.

In October 2023, the House of Commons accepted a report by the Independent Expert Panel recommending that Bone be suspended from the House for six weeks in relation to its findings that Bone had bullied and was sexually inappropriate around a former member of staff. This in turn triggered a recall petition under the Recall of MPs Act 2015 for his Wellingborough constituency in which Bone was vacated from his seat in December 2023. Bone was not a candidate at the subsequent by-election held in February 2024.

== Early life and education ==
Bone was born on 19 October 1952 in Billericay in Essex. He was educated at Westcliff High School for Boys, a grammar school. Bone qualified as a chartered accountant in 1976.

== Political career ==
In 1978, Bone was elected as a councillor for the Blenheim ward on Southend-on-Sea Borough Council, where he served for eight years, until 1986. He was elected as the deputy chairman of the Southend West Conservative Association in 1977 and continued in the position until 1984. In 1982, he became press secretary to the Conservative MP Paul Channon.

He unsuccessfully contested the parliamentary seat of Islwyn in the South Wales valleys at the 1992 general election against the then Leader of the Opposition Neil Kinnock. Bone subsequently fought the European Parliament election in 1994 for Mid and West Wales, coming third.

Bone was chosen for the previously safe Conservative seat of Pudsey in West Yorkshire following the retirement of the veteran MP Giles Shaw at the 1997 general election, but lost following a swing of 13.2% to Labour's Paul Truswell.

In the 2001 general election he fought the ultra-marginal seat of Wellingborough in Northamptonshire, where the sitting Labour MP Paul Stinchcombe held a majority of just 187, having defeated the veteran Conservative MP Peter Fry in 1997. Stinchcombe held on to his seat by 2,355, a swing of 2.1% to Labour.

== Member of Parliament ==
In the 2005 general election, Bone ousted Stinchcombe in Wellingborough with a majority of 687 votes, a swing of 2.9%.

Bone was a member of the 1922 Committee and was an executive member from 2007 to 2012.

In March 2009, Bone was one of the key speakers opposing the use of the House of Commons by the UK Youth Parliament, having been appointed one of the Tellers.

Although Bone was not mentioned in the 2009 Legg Report that was central to the official investigation into the United Kingdom parliamentary expenses scandal and therefore was not one of the 343 MPs required to pay back any money, he was subject to some later reports relating to his expenses. He was one of 32 MPs who claimed the maximum allowance of £4,800 a year for food in 2010 and came under investigation in 2014 for expenses claims relating to the upkeep of his second home. In 2016 he was criticised for using the government's help-to-buy scheme, which was meant to help young first time buyers, to buy himself a new constituency home.

At the 2010 general election Bone was re-elected as the MP for Wellingborough with an increased majority of 18,540 votes, achieving a swing of 6.15%.

Bone proposed a bill in July 2013, arguing that the August Bank Holiday should be renamed to Margaret Thatcher Day to commemorate her premiership. The bill ran out of time, due to filibustering by Labour MPs and formally ended its passage through Parliament in 2014.

In February 2014, The Times newspaper reported that Bone had been under investigation by the police during the previous 12 months relating to an alleged £100,000 fraud concerning benefit payments of care home fees for his mother-in-law. Bone issued a lengthy statement denying fraud allegations. In March 2014, the Crown Prosecution Service said it had concluded that there was insufficient evidence to bring criminal charges.

Bone was frequently critical of the coalition government of the Conservatives and the Liberal Democrats. In the 2015 general election, he increased his majority by 1,347 achieving 52.1% of the votes cast, and was re-elected in the 2017 general election with a decreased majority of 12,460.

In February 2018, following the announcement that Northamptonshire County Council had brought in a "section 114" notice, putting it in special measures following a crisis in its finances, Bone was one of seven local MPs who released a statement arguing that the problems with the authority were down to mismanagement from the Conservative councillors who led it rather than funding cuts from the Conservative government. They further argued that government commissioners should take over the running of the council.

Before they separated, Bone employed his wife, Jennie, as his executive secretary. In 2007–2008, he paid her "in the top bracket of up to £40,000" per annum. The practice of MPs employing family members has been criticised by some sections of the media as nepotism. Although MPs who were first elected in 2017 were banned from employing family members, the restriction was not retrospective – meaning that Bone's employment of his wife was lawful.

In June 2018, Bone defended fellow Conservative MP Christopher Chope after he was widely criticised for blocking a private member's bill to make it illegal to take photos of people aimed up their skirts. Bone said that Chope was "a great parliamentarian and public servant" and stated that "a government upskirting bill should be introduced soon, properly scrutinised and will become law much faster than by the private member's bill route."

In the 2019 general election, Bone increased his majority over Labour to 18,540, achieving 62.2% of the votes cast.

After the 2022 British cabinet reshuffle, Bone was promoted to the front bench for the first time as Deputy Leader of the House of Commons. He voted for Liz Truss to be the new Conservative leader and was part of her transition team, but was sacked from his ministerial role after she became prime minister.

== Bullying and sexual misconduct investigation ==
On 16 October 2023, the Independent Expert Panel recommended that Bone be suspended from the House of Commons, after a report found he had "committed many varied acts of bullying and one act of sexual misconduct" against a male member of his staff. The report stated that, having booked a single room for the two of them on a work trip in 2013, Bone had "dropped his towel and exposed his genitals close to his employee's face" while they were in the bathroom and went on to expose himself to the complainant in their shared bedroom. Following that trip, Bone ostracised the complainant. Bone was also found to have pressured the man into massaging him when they were alone in the office, and to have thrown objects or struck him on a number of occasions.

In 2015, an initial complaint was made by the man's father to the prime minister David Cameron, followed by a second complaint submitted to Theresa May (the new prime minister) in 2017. As the Conservative Party had not resolved its own investigation in a timely manner, the employee made a complaint through the Independent Complaints and Grievance Scheme in October 2021. That led to an investigation by the Parliamentary Commissioner for Standards who upheld the five allegations relating to bullying and harassment, and one of sexual misconduct by Bone. Bone appealed against the findings and the suspension, which were both upheld, and so a report to the house was made on 16 October 2023 recommending his suspension for six weeks.

Bone denied the allegations in the report via a post on the social media site X (formerly known as Twitter), stating the claims listed were "false and untrue" and "without foundation". He also said that the investigation by the IEP was "flawed" and "procedurally unfair".

On 17 October, the Conservative Party withdrew the whip, suspending him from his membership of the Parliamentary Conservative Party; he continued sitting as an independent MP until 19 December 2023 following the outcome of a recall petition against him.

=== Suspension and recall petition ===
Following a vote in the House of Commons, Bone was suspended from the House on 25 October 2023 for six weeks. The Recall of MPs Act 2015 requires a recall petition to be held for an MP suspended for ten days or more. If 10% of constituents sign it, the MP is recalled, requiring a by-election to elect an MP for the constituency. The recall petition was successful, with 10,505 votes out of a possible 79,402 eligible votes (13.2%), and Bone ceased to be a Member of Parliament, leaving the seat vacant and triggering a by-election in the Wellingborough constituency. The threshold to achieve a successful petition was 7,940 (or more) signatures. Bone reacted the result by describing the decision as "bizarre".

Bone did not stand as a candidate at the 2024 Wellingborough by-election, however his partner and former parliamentary assistant, Helen Harrison, was the Conservative candidate. The by-election was won by the Labour Party candidate, Gen Kitchen.

=== Post-suspension activities ===
On 31 October, following his suspension from the House of Commons and the Conservative whip, Bone was reported to have been campaigning with government minister Tom Pursglove. Following criticism by the Labour Party about this, the Prime Minister's spokesman said that Rishi Sunak had confidence in Pursglove.

== Political views ==
Bone is regarded as being on the right wing of the Conservative Party, and is a member of the socially conservative traditionalist Cornerstone Group. He has voted to lower the abortion time limit to 12 weeks and voted against abolishing the offences of blasphemy and blasphemous libel. He has urged the Charity Commission to award the tax breaks of registration to any legal faith group. The abortion time limit vote failed, the blasphemy vote passed, and tax breaks were not awarded.

Bone opposed the introduction of the National Minimum Wage, which he claimed would "condemn hundreds of thousands to the dole queue" and, in 2009, backed a private member's bill tabled by his colleague, Christopher Chope, proposing to enable employees to opt out of the minimum wage.

In 2009, Bone said of the National Health Service (NHS): "We have gone from having one of the best health services in the Western world to arguably the worst", which had "centralised and Stalinist management".

Bone described government proposals to introduce same-sex marriage rights as "completely nuts". He subsequently voted against the Marriage (Same Sex Couples) Act 2013.

In 2013, Bone was one of four MPs who camped outside Parliament in a move to facilitate parliamentary debate on what they called an "Alternative Queen's Speech" – an attempt to show what a future Conservative government might deliver. Forty-two policies were listed including reintroduction of the death penalty and conscription, privatising the BBC, banning the burka in public places, and preparation to leave the European Union. The Daily Telegraph believed the whips sent Edward Leigh to try to persuade the group not to table the amendments. Bone blamed the Liberal Democrats for tying David Cameron's hands.

A prominent Eurosceptic, Bone was often named as a potential defector to the UK Independence Party (UKIP). In 2014, Bone described UKIP's emergence as a "good thing for British politics", and criticised his own party for "neglecting" the views of traditional Conservatives on other issues such as immigration, but said he intended to campaign for withdrawal from the EU from within the Conservative Party. Bone is a director of Grassroots Out and was a director of the now-dissolved Go Movement Limited, with Nigel Farage and Tom Pursglove.

In September 2019, Bone said that a general election would be a "good thing" and a necessary step in order to establish a "Conservative government with a majority" and prevent a no-deal Brexit. Bone said that Boris Johnson would be an "excellent prime minister and get a proper Brexit deal and lead us to victory in the next general election". On 6 June 2022, after a vote of no confidence in Johnson's leadership was called, Bone announced that he would vote in support of him.

== Personal life ==
Bone married Jeanette Sweeney in 1981, and they had two sons and a daughter. In 2016, Bone separated from his wife, who is a Conservative councillor in the Borough of Wellingborough, and they were divorced in 2019. Bone is currently in a relationship with physiotherapist Helen Harrison, who was his senior parliamentary assistant from 2019 until 2022.

Bone played cricket as a left-arm bowler for Cambridge Methodists Cricket Club in Leeds. He also played cricket as a member of a Parliamentarians team, alongside Crispin Blunt and Hugh Robertson.

Bone primarily lives in London, but also owns a flat in the Denington Estate (formerly John Lea School site) in Wellingborough.

In March 2022, a man from Wellingborough pleaded guilty to three malicious communications offences of sending abusive and offensive messages to Bone's office phone relating to the government's COVID-19 restrictions, and was sentenced to 12 weeks in prison, suspended for 12 months.

Parliament of the United Kingdom
Preceded by Paul Stinchcombe	Member of Parliament for Wellingborough; 2005–2023	Succeeded by Gen Kitchen
Political offices
Vacant Title last held by Mark Spencer	Deputy Leader of the House of Commons; 2022	Vacant
