= Wellingborough by-election =

Wellingborough by-election may refer to two by-elections in Northamptonshire, England:

- 1969 Wellingborough by-election, following the death of Harry Howarth
- 2024 Wellingborough by-election, following the recall of Peter Bone
