= EUBINGO =

EUBINGO Federation of European Bingo Associations
- Formation: 2006
- Type: Advocacy Group
- Headquarters: Brussels, Belgium
- Location: European Union
- Chairman: Sir Peter Fry
- Website: www.eubingo.org

EUBINGO is the Federation of European Bingo Associations. It is a Brussels-based umbrella group for associations representing the bingo industry. It has active members in four European countries.

== History ==
The Federation of European Bingo Associations EUBINGO was established in early 2006. The official EUBINGO launch took place on 31 January 2006 at the European Parliament in Brussels, hosted by MEP Bill Newton Dunn. The original membership consisted of the British and Spanish participants, but by the end of the year EUBINGO had grown to four members.

== Activities ==
Much of EUBINGO's work consists of monitoring EU developments and keeping member associations informed on upcoming legislation which may affect them. The organisation also collates and distributes information on the bingo industry. On occasion, EUBINGO will make representations to lawmakers.

== Member Organisations ==
The following are member organisations of EUBINGO:

- The Bingo Association - United Kingdom
- Star Bingo Group - Ireland
- Federbingo - Italy
- CEJ - Spain
