= Sidney Box =

British trade unionist and political activist

Sidney Box (1873 – April 1958) was a British trade unionist and political activist.

Box was one of seventeen children, but was orphaned at the age of eight and began working as an agricultural labourer. A keen Methodist, he began preaching when he was sixteen. He spent periods working as a miner in South Wales, and on the railways, but by the early 1900s was again an agricultural labourer, based in Ledbury, in Herefordshire. He was a supporter of the Liberal Party, and at the 1906 United Kingdom general election, and January and December 1910 United Kingdom general elections, he was employed as an election agent for the party, giving him a clear picture of the state of agricultural workers throughout the county.

Early in 1912, Box decided to form the Herefordshire Agricultural Workers' Union. Box wrote to Charles Duncan of the Workers' Union, asking for its support; the union sent Robert Morley to tour the county, speaking in support of union membership, and when this proved successful, it appointed Box as its full-time county organiser, and he merged the agricultural union into the Workers' Union.

Box proved successful as a trade union organiser; he established fifty branches by the start of 1914, these now constituting around one-tenth of the branches of the entire Workers' Union. He received supportive coverage from the Hereford Times, and survived being shot at while cycling home from a union meeting. Although he left his post in 1915, he was reappointed in 1918.

By this time, Box had switched his political affiliation to the Labour Party, and he held membership of the Independent Labour Party. At the 1918 United Kingdom general election, he became the first Labour candidate in Hereford, taking 24.2% of the vote. He stood again at the 1923 United Kingdom general election, but his vote dropped back to only 4.7%.

In 1954, Box published his autobiography, The Good Old Days: Then and Now.
