= Joseph Harris (trade unionist) =

Joseph Harris (born 1866) was an Irish trade unionist and political activist.

Born in Dublin, Harris became a cabinet maker, and moved to Belfast to find work. He joined the Amalgamated Union of Upholsterers, and became prominent in the local trade union movement. In 1907, Robert Morley from the British-based Workers' Union came to speak in the city, and while he was present, a major strike occurred. This enabled him to recruit two local branches of factory workers, and Harris was appointed as the union's full-time Irish Organiser. Initially, he proved successful, recruiting heavily among chemical workers and builders' labourers', giving a total membership of more than 500. Although many of these workers soon left, Harris began recruiting among linen workers in Lisburn, and worked with James Larkin to establish branches of the union in Derry, Dundalk, Lisburn and Limerick. In 1908, he tried to establish a branch in Dublin, but due to disputes with other unions, he offered to transfer the branches to the Irish Transport and General Workers' Union. Larkin declined the offer and, annoyed by this, Harris became an opponent of Larkin. He worked with James Sexton to get Larkin removed from the Parliamentary Committee of the Irish Trades Union Congress. The union's branches across Ireland did not prove lasting, and by 1911 Harris was described as the union's organiser for the Belfast District.

During the early 1910s, the Workers' Union grew substantially in Britain, but Harris struggled to match this. Several local strikes ended in defeat, with many members leaving, though Harris claimed that his difficulties resulted from employers exploiting religious differences among workers. Early in 1913, he was transferred to South West England, to become assistant organiser to Matt Giles. Membership in the region was increasing rapidly, and by the end of the year, Devon and Cornwall was split off as a new region, with Harris as its organiser. He served on the Cornwall Agricultural Wages Committee, and soon chaired the Joint Industrial Committee for the china clay industry.

The union sponsored Harris as a candidate in Penryn and Falmouth at the 1922 United Kingdom general election, and then in Plymouth Devonport at the 1923 United Kingdom general election, taking third place on each occasion.
