= 2024 Wellingborough by-election =

By-election in the United Kingdom

- 15 February 2024

Wellingborough constituency
- Registered: 79,376
- Turnout: 38.0% (▼26.3 pp)
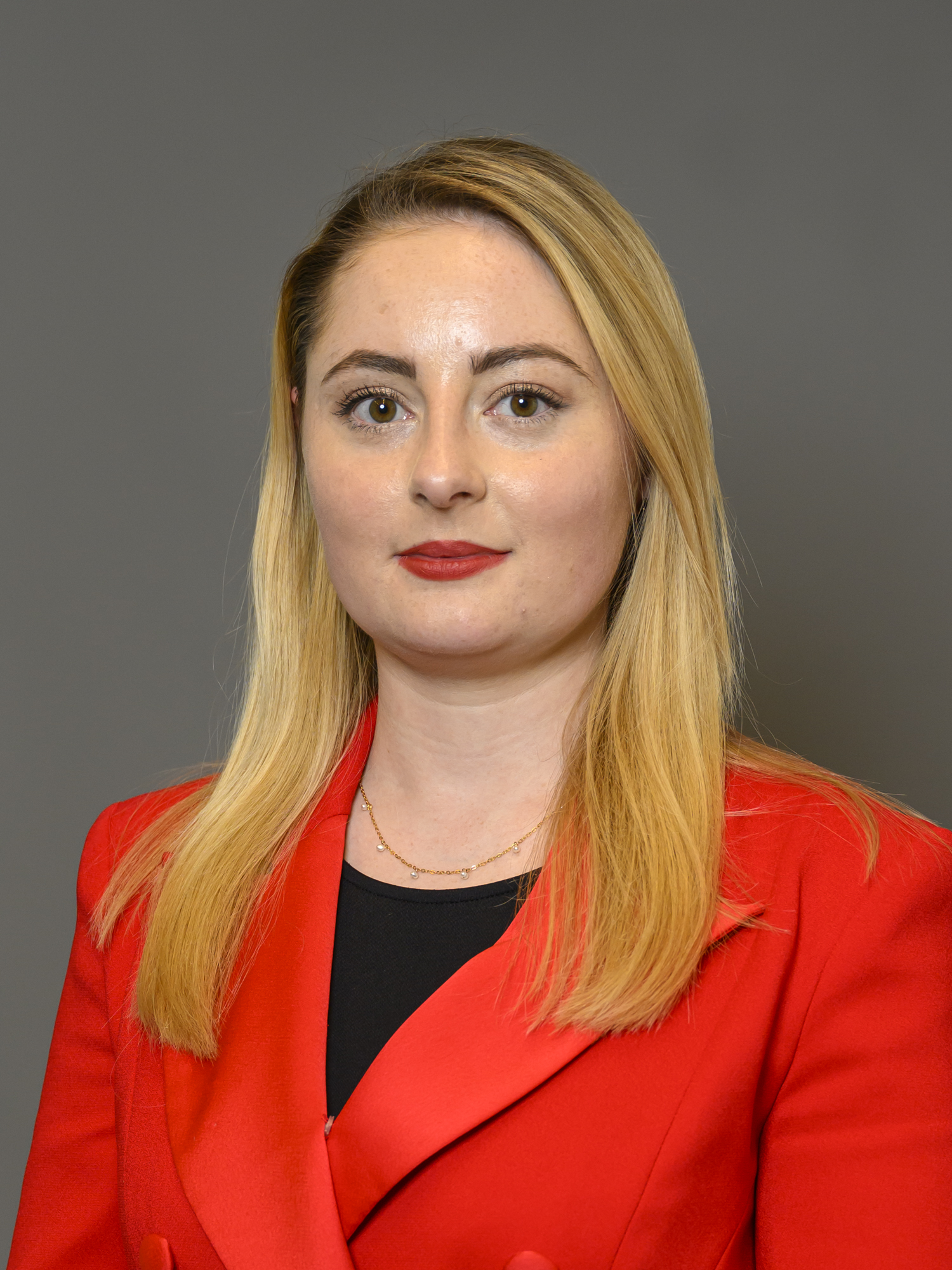

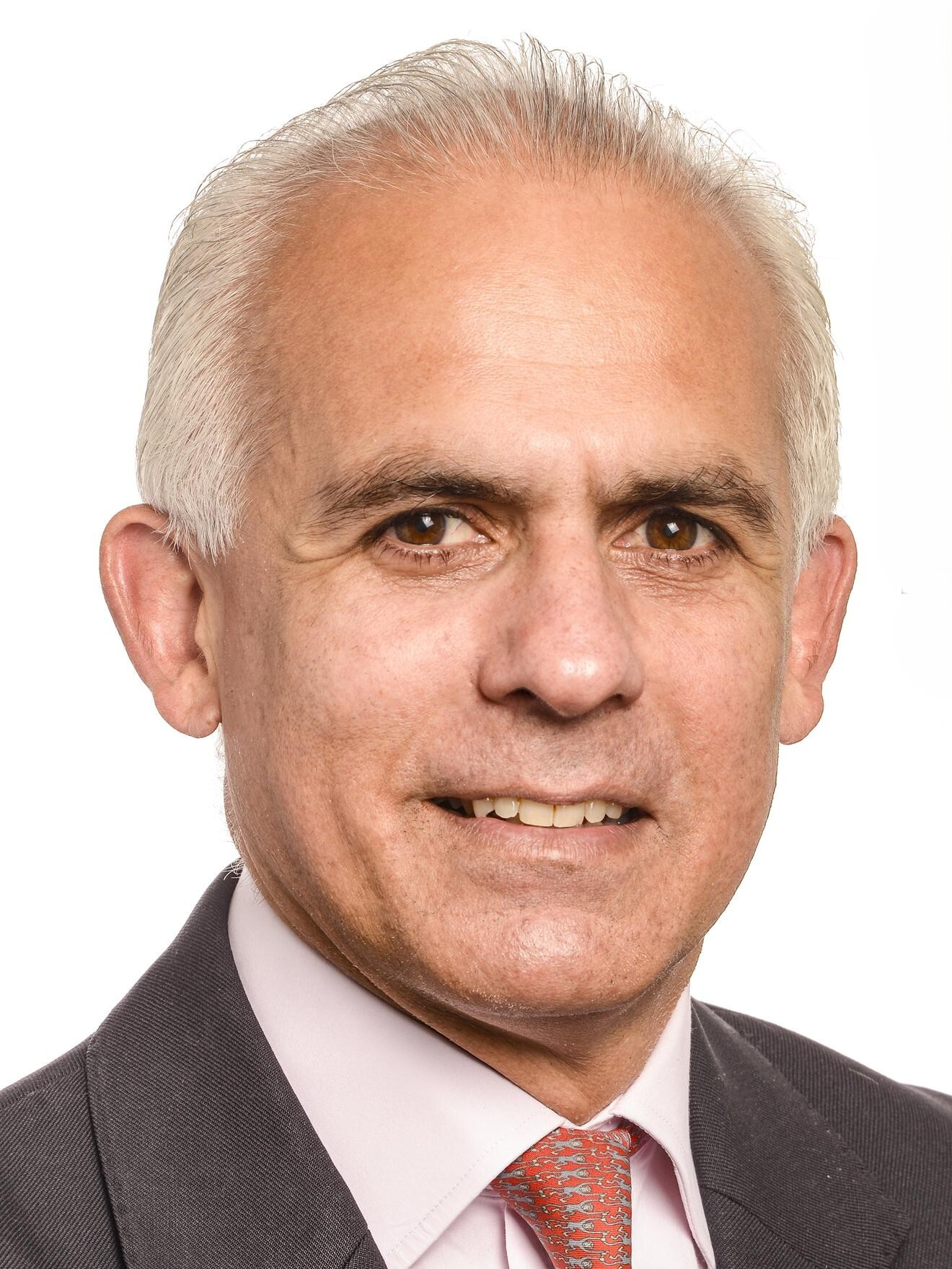
	First party	Second party	Third party
Candidate	Gen Kitchen	Helen Harrison	Ben Habib
Party	Labour	Conservative	Reform
Popular vote	13,844	7,408	3,919
Percentage	45.9%	24.6%	13.0%
Swing	▲19.5 pp	▼37.6 pp	New
MP before election
Peter Bone
Independent (elected as a Conservative)
Elected MP
Gen Kitchen
Labour

A by-election for the United Kingdom parliamentary constituency of Wellingborough was held on 15 February 2024, triggered by a recall petition that removed incumbent Conservative MP Peter Bone, following his suspension from the House of Commons for bullying and sexual harassment. The by-election was won by Gen Kitchen of the Labour Party.

Bone was suspended from the House of Commons for six weeks on 25 October 2023. The length of his suspension automatically initiated a recall petition which was held in late 2023. On 19 December, it was announced the petition had been successful and Bone was officially unseated under the terms of the Recall of MPs Act 2015.

The by-election resulted in the biggest swing from the Conservatives to Labour since the 1994 Dudley West by-election and the second biggest since the Second World War. It was also the largest ever drop in the Conservative Party vote share in a by-election, the largest drop in any party's vote share since the 1948 Glasgow Camlachie by-election, and the worst performance by the Conservatives in the constituency's history, falling below the 25.4% of the vote it received in 1923. The turnout was 38%, compared to a 64.3% turnout in the constituency at the last general election.

The by-election took place on the same day as the Kingswood by-election, also won by Labour from the Conservatives.

== Constituency ==
Wellingborough is a county constituency in the East of Northamptonshire, and contains the settlements of Wellingborough, Rushden, Higham Ferrers, Irchester and Finedon.

Created in 1918, the Wellingborough constituency was considered a bellwether from the late 1960s to the 2000s. After the 1997 general election, Wellingborough had the smallest Labour majority in the country – 187 votes. It has been a Conservative-held seat since Bone's election in 2005, and has been considered a safe seat since 2010. The seat is estimated to have voted Leave in the 2016 referendum on the United Kingdom's European Union membership by a margin of 64% to 36%.

== Recall petition ==
=== Background ===
An employee of MP Peter Bone made a complaint through the Independent Complaints and Grievance Scheme in October 2021. That led to an investigation by the Parliamentary Commissioner for Standards who upheld five allegations relating to bullying and harassment, and one of sexual misconduct.

Bone appealed against the findings and the recommended suspension, which were both upheld, and so a report to the house was made by the Independent Expert Panel on 16 October 2023 recommending his suspension for six weeks.

The panel's report found Bone had "committed many varied acts of bullying and one act of sexual misconduct" against a male member of his staff. The report stated that, having booked a single room for the two of them on a work trip in 2013, Bone had "dropped his towel and exposed his genitals close to his employee's face" while they were in the bathroom, and went on to expose himself to the complainant in their shared bedroom. Following that trip, Bone ostracised the complainant. Bone was also found to have pressured the man into massaging him when they were alone in the office, and to have thrown objects or struck him on a number of occasions.

Bone denied the allegations in the report, stating the claims listed were "false and untrue" and "without foundation". He also said that the investigation by the IEP was "flawed" and "procedurally unfair".

On 17 October, the Conservative Party withdrew the whip, suspending him from his membership of the Parliamentary Conservative Party.

Following a vote on 25 October, Bone was suspended from the House of Commons for six weeks. The length of his suspension automatically triggered a recall petition in his constituency.

=== Petition process ===
The petition was open for signatures from 8 November to 19 December 2023. During this period registered voters in the constituency were able to sign at one of nine designated petition signing places between 9am and 5pm Monday–Friday, with extended signing hours on 13 November. Voters registered for postal or proxy ballots could also sign by these means. The total number of electors entitled to sign the petition was 79,046, with the threshold for a successful recall determined to be 7,904 signatures.

=== Result ===
The recall petition was successful, with 10,505 signatures (13.2% of the electorate), exceeding the 10% signature requirement, and Bone ceased to be a Member of Parliament, triggering a by-election. Bone reacted to the outcome of the petition by calling it "bizarre" as the majority of eligible petitioners did not sign the petition. He was permitted to stand in the resulting by-election, but did not do so.

== Campaign ==
The recall petition closed as the Commons rose for its Christmas recess. The writ of election for this and the Kingswood by-election were moved on 11 January 2024, and later that day the date of 15 February 2024 was announced. BBC News reported that main issues in the campaign were rising crime and local buses.

=== Candidates ===
Labour selected charity worker Gen Kitchen to stand in November 2023, from a shortlist of two.

The Liberal Democrats selected care home worker Ana Savage Gunn, previously candidate for Northamptonshire Police, Fire and Crime Commissioner.

The Green Party selected Will Morris, an insurance underwriter and parish councillor. Marion Turner-Hawes, who represented the Green Party in 2015 and 2019, stood as an independent.

On 7 January 2024, the Conservatives selected Helen Harrison, who represents Oundle ward on North Northamptonshire Council and was the party's candidate in Bolsover at the 2017 general election. She is the partner of Peter Bone, and The Times had reported that Bone was trying to help his partner become the candidate, with the threat of standing as an independent against the Conservatives if she were not selected. Harrison is a chartered physiotherapist by profession.

Reform UK reportedly had discussions with Bone regarding him standing for re-election as their candidate. However, on 3 January 2024 the party chose its co-deputy leader Ben Habib.

On 9 January, former Northamptonshire Police officer and Irchester parish councillor Kevin Watts announced he was running as an independent. Andre Pyne-Bailey also stood as an independent.

On 17 January, the novelty Official Monster Raving Loony Party announced its candidate Nick the Flying Brick, who told the Northants Telegraph: "I'm a single issue politician – I plan to abolish gravity."

Perennial by-election candidate Ankit Love, the British-Kashmiri leader of the Indian-registered Jammu and Kashmir National Panthers Party (JKNPP), stood in the name of that party and his late mother, Jay Mala, who died in April 2023. Alex Merola stood for Britain First.

== Result ==
A limited recount was held for verification purposes.

Bar chart of the election result.

2024 Wellingborough by-election
Party	Candidate	Votes	%	±%
Labour	Gen Kitchen	13,844	45.9	+19.4
Conservative	Helen Harrison	7,408	24.6	–37.6
Reform	Ben Habib	3,919	13.0	New
Liberal Democrats	Ana Savage Gunn	1,422	4.7	–3.2
Independent	Marion Turner-Hawes	1,115	3.7	+0.2
Green	Will Morris	1,020	3.4	–0.1
Independent	Kev Watts	533	1.8	New
Britain First	Alex Merola	477	1.6	New
Monster Raving Loony	Nick the Flying Brick	217	0.7	New
Independent	Andre Pyne-Bailey	172	0.6	New
Independent	Ankit Love Jknpp Jay Mala Post-Mortem	18	0.1	New
Majority		6,436	21.3	N/A
Turnout		30,145	38.0	–26.3
Registered electors		79,376		
Labour gain from Conservative		Swing	+28.5	

== Previous result ==
2019 general election: Wellingborough
Party	Candidate	Votes	%	±%
Conservative	Peter Bone	32,277	62.2	+4.8
Labour	Andrea Watts	13,737	26.5	–7.5
Liberal Democrats	Suzanna Austin	4,078	7.9	+4.6
Green	Marion Turner-Hawes	1,821	3.5	+1.7
Majority		18,540	35.7	+12.3
Turnout		51,913	64.3	–2.9
Conservative hold		Swing	+6.15	

== See also ==
- List of United Kingdom by-elections (2010–present)
