= Workers' Union =

Former trade union of the United Kingdom

- Merged into: Transport and General Workers' Union
- Founded: 1 May 1898; 128 years ago
- Dissolved: 1929; 97 years ago
- Headquarters: Highfield, Golders Green Road, Golders Green
- Location(s): United Kingdom and Ireland
- Members: 500,000 (1919)
- General Secretary: Charles Duncan (last)
- Publication: Record
- Affiliations: TUC, Labour

The Workers' Union was a general trade union based in the United Kingdom and Ireland, with small branches overseas. The union was founded on 1 May 1898. During the 1910s, it was the largest general union in the UK, but it went into decline in the 1920s. In 1929 the Workers' Union amalgamated into the Transport and General Workers' Union (TGWU).

== History ==
=== Background ===
The idea for a general trade union arose following an 1897 strike of London-based engineers. The action was defeated by the new Engineering Employers' Federation, and many trade unionists feared that this example would be followed by other employers. Discussions in the Weekly Times and Echo led to the International Federation of Ship, Dock and River Workers issuing an appeal for the formation of a new general union. The federation's president, Tom Mann, gave the appeal strong support, chairing a conference in February 1898 which proposed a "labour league" or "workers' union", which would organise workers in all trades and industries as a general trade union, and support independent labour candidates at elections.

=== Formation ===
The first branches of the union were formed in April 1898 in Bradford, Halifax, Leeds, London, Manchester, Middlesbrough and Oldham, with the union officially launched on May Day. Tom Chambers was employed as general secretary, and Charles Duncan as president and general organiser. Tom Mann worked as vice president and worked only part-time for the union. On formation, the union affiliated to the Trades Union Congress (TUC) and the General Federation of Trade Unions (GFTU), but it left both bodies in 1900, as a money-saving measure.

Initially, the union was unsuccessful, membership peaking at 4,172 at the end of 1898. For example, recruitment at both the Army & Navy Stores and Lipton's Tea led to industrial action, and short booms in membership followed by defeats and then a collapse in membership. William Banham and J. Wade were employed as full-time local organisers in London, while other early organisers included John Mahoney in Middlesbrough, and George Newcombe in Coventry, but all had left by the end of 1901. From late 1900, Chambers and Mann were forced to devote their time to the international federation, Chambers being replaced by Duncan, who in turn was succeeded as president by Robert Morley, while Mann retained his office as an honorary position. Duncan successfully brought the union's finances under control, and began offering optional benefits to out-of-work members. For the next few years, membership continued to fall, bottoming out at only 1,000 in 1903, but it then began growing, reaching 5,000 in 1910. New organisers were employed, including George Titt in Manchester, Joseph Harris in Ireland, and Matt Giles in South Wales, while John Beard, who had been working part-time for the union among agricultural workers, was transferred to a full-time post in Birmingham.

The Workers' Union was a founder member of the Labour Representation Committee, and remained affiliated as it became the Labour Party. Despite its original aim of sponsoring labour candidates, it was unable to do so until 1918. However, Duncan managed to gain the sponsorship of the Amalgamated Society of Engineers, and served as an MP from 1906 onwards.

1911 saw increased unrest among workers in the UK, and the Workers' Union capitalised on this. Membership increased rapidly, to 18,000 by the end of 1911, 91,000 by the end of 1913, and 143,000 by mid-1914. It was now a similar size to the National Union of Gasworkers and General Labourers, the largest general union in the UK. The additional funds allowed Duncan to launch a publicity campaign, principally through the Daily Citizen, and take on several members of administrative staff, and increase the number of full-time organisers from six to forty. They included George Dallas in London, and George Kerr in Scotland Beard defeated Morley in the 1913 presidential election, his victory coming on the back of the recruitment of large numbers of semi-skilled engineering workers in the West Midlands by him, Arthur Ellery, and Julia Varley. The union also recruited strongly among agricultural workers, with Sidney Box and R. O. Hornagold being the principal organisers.

In 1913 the Workers' Union attempted to rejoin the TUC, but was blocked by other unions which claimed that it was poaching their members. The union's leadership supported First World War, with both Beard and Duncan joining the British Workers' League, although they left in 1918 when it supported anti-Labour Party Parliamentary candidates. Duncan and Morley stood for the Labour Party in the 1918 UK general election, but both were unsuccessful. Neil Maclean, a union member, did win a seat with the backing of the Independent Labour Party, and in 1919 he was elected to the union's executive.

The union's growth stalled during the First World War, but then leapt dramatically in 1918, reaching 495,000 by the end of the year, making it the largest trade union in the country. It tried to recruit more women, and by the end of the war had twenty women organisers, who succeeded to take women's membership from 5,000 to 80,000 by the end of the war. The union also recruited among Belgian refugee engineers, who at the end of the war were transferred to the Belgian Metal Workers' Union. A large number of small, localised unions amalgamated in, with the National Farm and Dairy Workers' Union and Anglesey Workers' Union boosting agricultural membership—which peaked at around 120,000—and the National Union of Government Employees, led by Arthur Gourd, boosting membership in dockyards—which peaked at about 25,000. Expansion allowed the opening of an arbitration department, led by William Kelly, and the opening of new headquarters in Golders Green. A divisional structure was adopted in 1915, with Beard, Dallas, Ellery, Giles, Harris, Kerr, Morley and Titt appointed to head the new divisions, supplemented after the war by William Adamson, Gourd, Hugh Lawrie, Tom Macnamara (soon succeeded by Alf Edmonds), and James McKeag.

In July 1918, the union led a general strike on the Isle of Mann. The strike was successful, with demands being met by Lieutenant Governor of Mann, George Somerset, who resigned his Governorship in December that year.

The late 1910s saw the Workers' Union establish branches overseas. Gibraltar. A branch was established in Malta with 500 dockworkers, and another branch was established in Tangier, Morocco. In 1919 the Workers' Union attempted to establish a branch within the Union of South Africa. George Kendall was put in charge of this expansion, but the effort resulted in failure due to Kendall's "drinking habits and neglect to carry out his engagements". By the end of 1920, these efforts had only garned 3,057 overseas members.

In 1919, the union joined the National Amalgamated Workers Union, a loose confederation with the Municipal Employees Association and the National Amalgamated Union of Labour, but this dissolved in 1922.

=== Amalgamation with the Transport and General Workers' Union ===
Membership of the union collapsed during the 1920s, with job losses due to the depression, the General Strike of 1926 and disputes over payments to members of the executive committee. In 1929, it merged into the Transport and General Workers' Union (TGWU), with about 100,000 members remaining to transfer. This enabled the TGWU, for the first time, to gain significant numbers of members outside of the docks and transport industries.

== Election results ==
The union sponsored Labour Party candidates in numerous Parliamentary elections, several of whom won election.

Election	Constituency	Candidate	Votes	Percentage	Position
1918 general election	Barrow-in-Furness	Charles Duncan	12,309	49.4	2
1918 general election	Doncaster	Robert Morley	5,153	25.0	2
1920 by-election	The Wrekin	Charles Duncan	8,729	38.4	2
1922 general election	Cannock	William Adamson	9,889	36.8	1
1922 general election	Clay Cross	Charles Duncan	13,206	57.9	1
1922 general election	Maldon	George Dallas	6,085	27.8	2
1922 general election	Penryn and Falmouth	Joseph Harris	4,482	16.6	3
1922 general election	Portsmouth Central	Arthur Gourd	6,126	21.4	4
1922 general election	Sheffield Park	Robert Morley	10,578	47.8	2
1923 general election	Cannock	William Adamson	11,956	41.4	1
1923 general election	Clay Cross	Charles Duncan	11,939	56.0	1
1923 general election	Plymouth Devonport	Joseph Harris	4,158	15.5	3
1923 general election	Roxburgh and Selkirk	George Dallas	6,811	26.1	3
1924 general election	Cannock	William Adamson	16,347	51.9	1
1924 general election	Clay Cross	Charles Duncan	14,618	64.4	1
1924 general election	Edinburgh North	Eleanor Stewart	8,192	27.9	2
1924 general election	Ilkeston	George Oliver	11,011	44.9	1
1924 general election	Rochdale	William Kelly	14,609	33.8	1
1929 general election	Cannock	William Anderson	26,388	54.2	1
1929 general election	Clay Cross	Charles Duncan	24,480	80.2	1
1929 general election	Ilkeston	George Oliver	20,202	59.0	1
1929 general election	Rochdale	William Kelly	22,060	40.2	1
1929 general election	Stalybridge and Hyde	Hugh Hartley Lawrie	20,343	41.1	1
1929 general election	Wellingborough	George Dallas	15,300	42.2	1

== Officials ==
=== General Secretaries ===
1898: Tom Chambers
1900: Charles Duncan

=== Presidents ===
1898: Charles Duncan
1900: Robert Morley
1913: John Beard
