= George Dallas (Labour politician) =

British politician (1878–1961)

George Dallas MP
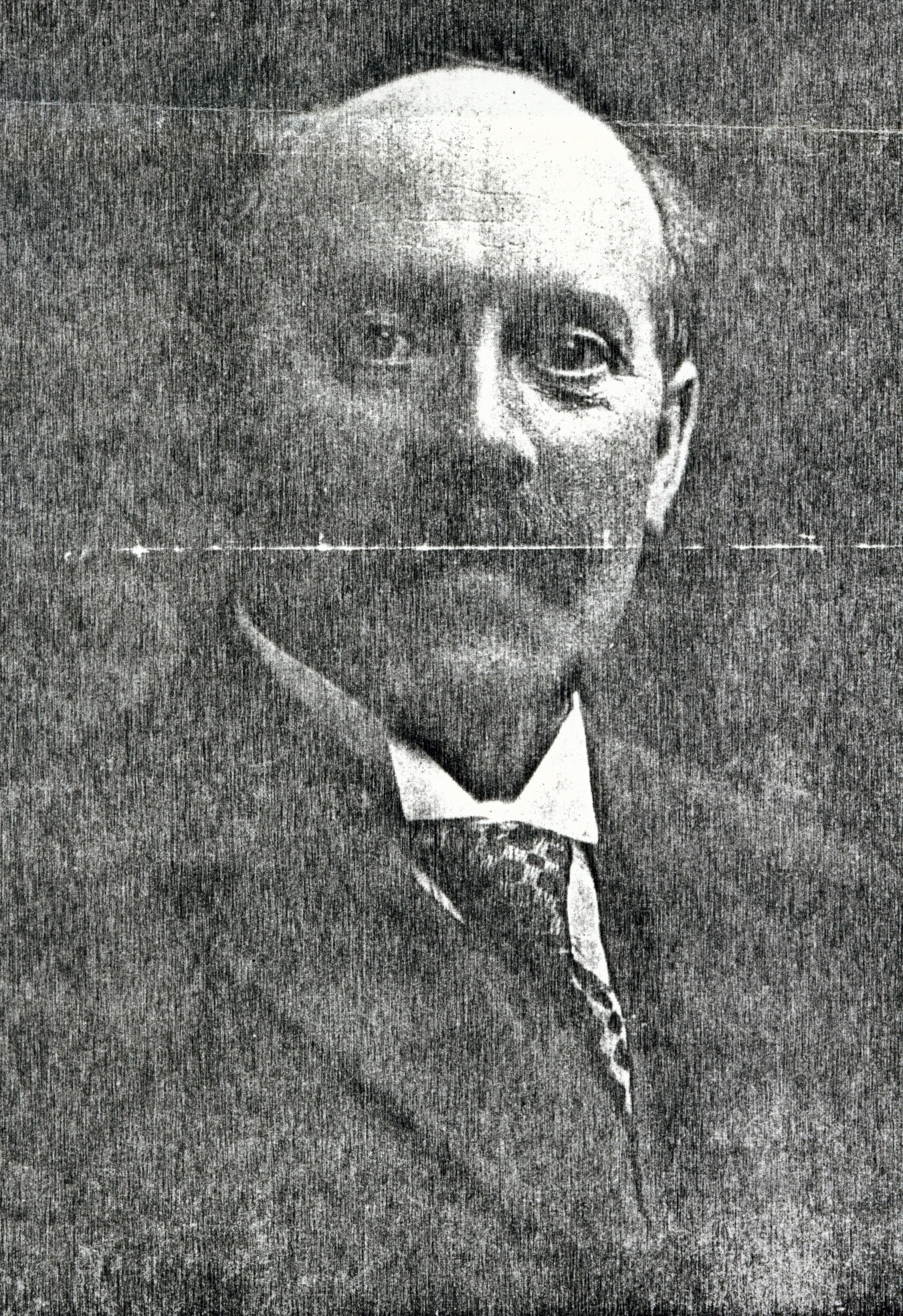

Member of Parliament for Wellingborough
- In office 1929–1931
- Preceded by: William Cove
- Succeeded by: Archibald James

Personal details
- Born: George Dallas; 8 June 1878 Glasgow
- Died: 4 January 1961 (aged 82) Bishop's Stortford, Hertfordshire
- Party: Labour

George Dallas (6 August 1878 – 4 January 1961) was a British Labour Party politician. George Dallas contested Roxburgh and Selkirk at the 1924 General Election, coming third behind Unionist and Liberal candidates.

== Life and career ==
Born in Glasgow, Dallas worked as a coal miner in his youth. He joined the Socialist League in about 1894 before moving to London to work for a coal merchant. Returning to Glasgow, he participated in the trade union movement and a variety of jobs before becoming the Secretary of the Independent Labour Party in Scotland from 1908 until 1912.

In 1912, Dallas moved back to London to work as the organiser of the National Federation of Women Workers, but soon moved to the Workers' Union. In 1917, he was appointed to the Agricultural Wages Board. In 1922, he moved to the newly built Welwyn Garden City.

At the 1918 and 1922 general elections, he was an unsuccessful candidate in the Maldon constituency in Essex, coming a distant second on each occasion, with 39.6% and 27.8% of the votes respectively. He was unsuccessful again at the 1923 general election in Scottish constituency of Roxburgh and Selkirk, coming third with 26% of the votes.

Dallas did not contest the 1924 general election. However, at the 1929 general election, he was elected to the House of Commons as Member of Parliament for the marginal seat of Wellingborough in Northamptonshire, after the sitting Labour MP William Cove moved to the safe Labour seat of Aberavon in Wales.

When the Labour Party split at the 1931 general election, he lost his seat with a swing of 16.6% to the Conservative candidate Archibald James, who had criticized Dallas' views on the crisis.

After his loss, Dallas was appointed to several Government committees set to investigate agricultural and water problems. In 1935, he visited European centres where international gatherings of Labour representatives have taken place to discuss the Italo-Abyssinian dispute. Dallas stood in Wellingborough again at the 1935 general election, cutting the Conservative majority to 372 votes. However, he resigned his candidacy a few months later, partly due to illness. He continued his activities for the Labour Party, and was elected chairman of the National Executive Committee in 1937. He died in Bishop's Stortford, Hertfordshire aged 82.

== Bibliography ==
- Hyman, Richard (1971). The Workers' Union. Oxford: Clarendon Press.
- Craig, F. W. S. (1983) [1969]. British parliamentary election results 1918-1949 (3rd ed.). Chichester: Parliamentary Research Services. ISBN 0-900178-06-X.
- C.V.J. Griffiths; Dallas, George (1878–1961); article of the Oxford Dictionary of National Biography

Parliament of the United Kingdom
Preceded by William Cove	Member of Parliament for Wellingborough; 1929–1931	Succeeded by Archibald James
Party political offices
Preceded by George Kerr	Secretary of the Scottish Divisional Council of the Independent Labour Party; 1910–1912	Succeeded by William Stewart
Preceded by Hugh Dalton	Chair of the Labour Party; 1937–1939	Succeeded by Barbara Ayrton-Gould
