= Gen Kitchen =

British politician (born 1995)

Gen Kitchen MP
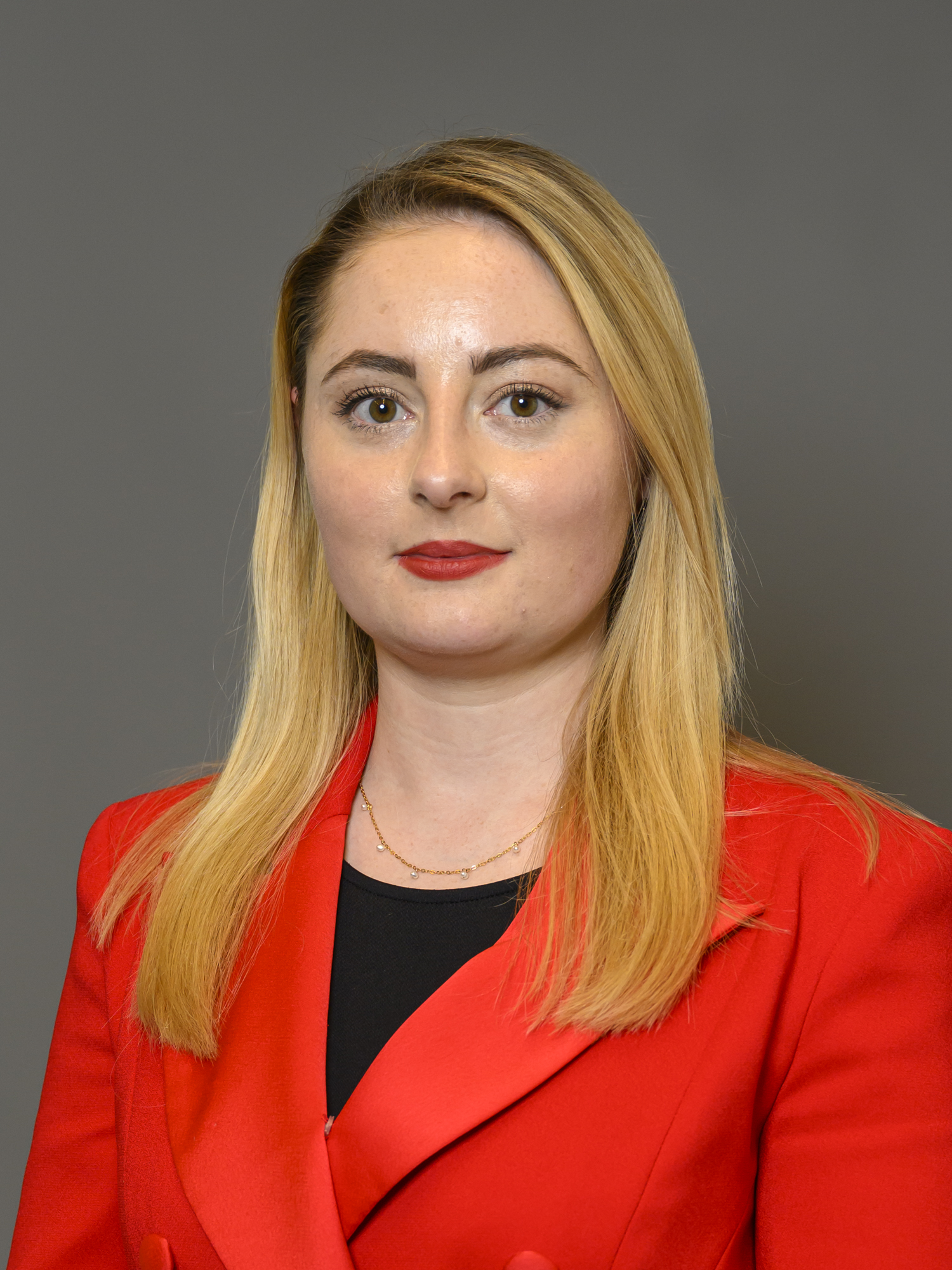
- Official portrait, 2024

Comptroller of the Household
- Incumbent
- Assumed office 12 May 2026
- Prime Minister: Keir Starmer; Andy Burnham
- Preceded by: Nesil Caliskan

Lord Commissioner of the Treasury
- In office 16 September 2025 – 12 May 2026
- Prime Minister: Keir Starmer

Assistant Government Whip
- In office 10 July 2024 – 16 September 2025
- Prime Minister: Keir Starmer

Member of Parliament for Wellingborough and Rushden Wellingborough (2024)
- Incumbent
- Assumed office 15 February 2024
- Preceded by: Peter Bone
- Majority: 5,456 (12.5%)

Member of Newham London Borough Council for Boleyn
- In office 3 May 2018 – 5 May 2022

Personal details
- Born: Genevieve Victoria Kitchen; 5 May 1995 (age 31)
- Party: Labour
- Education: Queen Mary University of London (BA)

Genevieve Victoria Kitchen (born 5 May 1995) is a British politician who has been the Comptroller of the Household since 2026. She has served as Member of Parliament (MP) for Wellingborough and Rushden, previously Wellingborough, since 2024. A member of the Labour Party, she was a member of Newham London Borough Council in Greater London from 2018 to 2022.

== Early life and education ==
Genevieve Kitchen was born on 5 May 1995, the daughter of two Royal Navy veterans. She grew up in Northamptonshire, and attended Caroline Chisholm School in Northampton, John Hellins Primary School in Potterspury, and Kingsbrook Secondary School (now Elizabeth Woodville School) in Deanshanger. She studied history and politics at Queen Mary University of London, and graduated in 2016.

Kitchen has been a fundraiser in the charity sector, working with organisations including The Salvation Army, Sarcoma UK, a children's hospice and a children's health charity. From 2018 to 2022, she was a councillor in the London Borough of Newham representing the ward of Boleyn and served as deputy cabinet member for regeneration.

== Parliamentary career ==
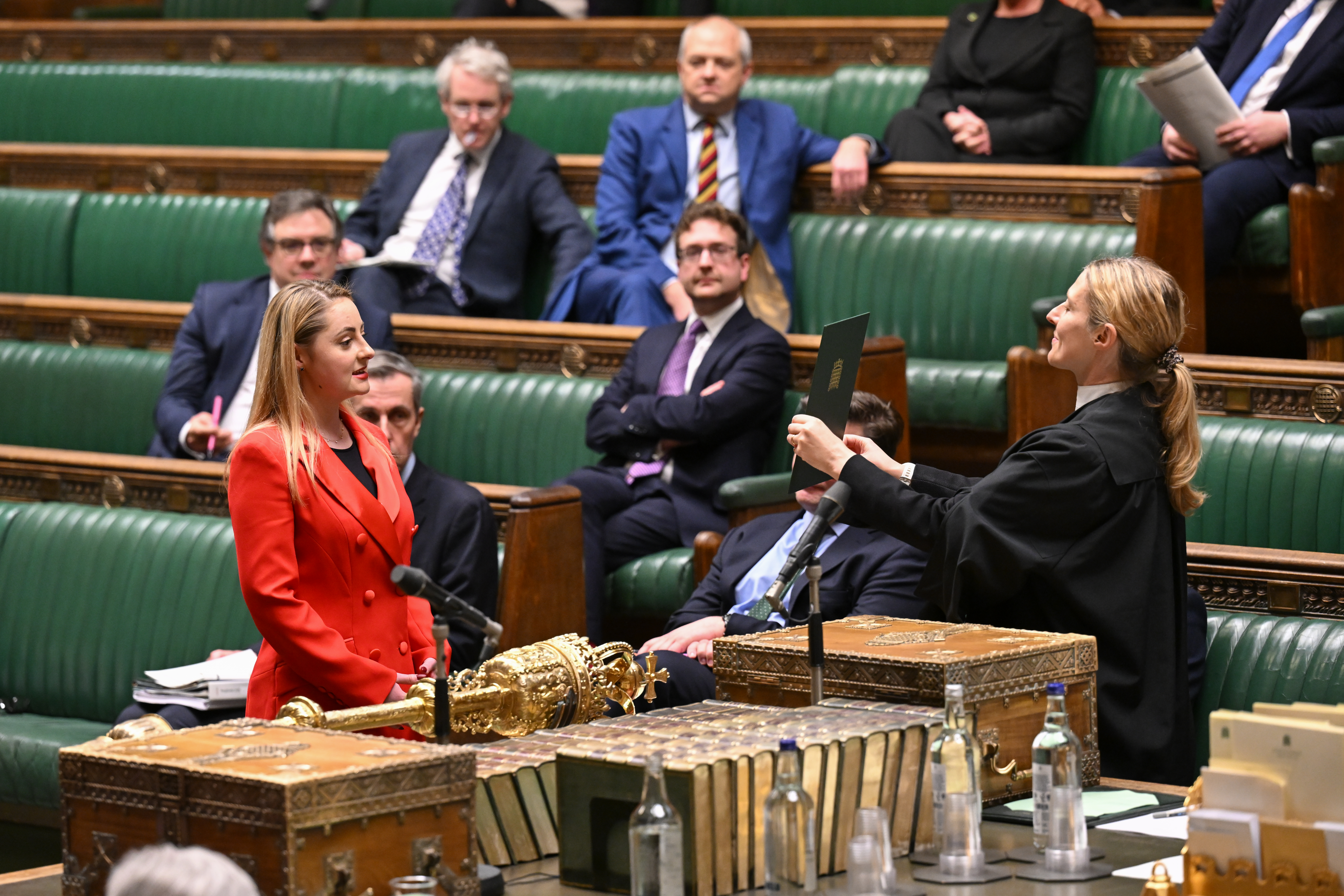
Kitchen being sworn in to the House of Commons on 19 February 2024

In the 2019 general election, Kitchen stood for Labour in South Northamptonshire, finishing in second place with 20.9 per cent of the vote behind Andrea Leadsom, the incumbent Conservative MP and business secretary.

In November 2023, she was selected as the prospective parliamentary candidate for Wellingborough. When the recall petition to remove Peter Bone was successful, she launched her campaign in the 2024 Wellingborough by-election. She was endorsed by the former Conservative leader of the local council. Kitchen was elected as MP for Wellingborough, winning with 45.9 per cent of the vote and a majority of 6,436.

She was re-elected in the renamed constituency of Wellingborough and Rushden in the 2024 general election. On 12 May 2026, she was appointed Comptroller of HM Household (Government Whip). In July 2026, she was reappointed to the new government by Andy Burnham.

She is a member of the Fabian Society.

== Personal life ==
Kitchen married her husband Joe in October 2023. She cut short her honeymoon in Suffolk to campaign in the 2024 Wellingborough by-election.

Parliament of the United Kingdom
Preceded by Peter Bone	Member of Parliament for Wellingborough; 2024–2024	Constituency abolished
New constituency	Member of Parliament for Wellingborough and Rushden; 2024–present	Incumbent
