= George Lindgren, Baron Lindgren =

British Labour Party politician

Lindgren in 1965

George Samuel Lindgren, Baron Lindgren, JP, DL (11 November 1900 – 8 September 1971) was a British Labour Party politician.

Born in Islington, London, at the 1935 general election he was an unsuccessful candidate in the safe Conservative seat of Hitchin in Hertfordshire, coming a distant second with 36.7% of the votes.

At the 1945 general election, Lindgren was elected to the House of Commons as Member of Parliament for the marginal seat of Wellingborough in Northamptonshire, ousting the sitting Conservative MP Archibald James on a swing of 7.7% vote.

He was immediately appointed to the new Labour government as a junior minister, serving as Parliamentary Secretary to the Minister of National Insurance from 1945 to 1946, as Parliamentary Secretary to the Minister of Civil Aviation from 1946 to 1950, and as Parliamentary Secretary to the Minister of Town and Country Planning from 1950 to 1951.

He appears in a film held by the Cinema Museum in London opening council housing in Sutton in Ashfield in 1952.

Lindgren held the seat until the 1959 general election, when he lost his seat by 606 votes to the Conservative Michael Hamilton. He returned to his former occupation as a railway clerk, working in the Eastern Region Chief Civil Engineer's Office at King's Cross station.

He was made a life peer on 9 February 1961 as Baron Lindgren, of Welwyn Garden City in the County of Hertford. He took his seat in the House of Lords, and in Harold Wilson's Labour government he served from 1964 to 1966 as Parliamentary Secretary to the Minister of Transport and from January to April 1966 as Parliamentary Secretary to the Ministry of Power.

Lord Lindgren died in 1971 aged 70.

== Notes ==
Parliament of the United Kingdom
Preceded by Archibald James	Member of Parliament for Wellingborough; 1945–1959	Succeeded by Michael Hamilton
Trade union offices
Preceded by Edward Friend	Chair of the London Trades Council; 1939–1942	Succeeded by Jock Tiffin
