= George Kerr (UK politician) =

Scottish politician and trade unionist

George Kerr (died 12 February 1942) was a Scottish politician and trade unionist.

Born in Glasgow, Kerr became involved in the Clarion socialist movement. He was secretary of the Glasgow Clarion Scouts for ten years, and in 1900 became an advance agent for the Clarion Van movement. He joined the Independent Labour Party in 1894, and in 1906 became the first full-time organiser of its Scottish Divisional Council. From 1910, he began solely organising the Glasgow district of the party.

Kerr was also active in the Workers' Union, acting as a volunteer organiser. At the end of 1911, he was appointed as its first full-time organiser for Scotland. At the time, the union had only 250 members in Scotland, but by 1914, he had increased its membership to 9,000, mostly in Glasgow, and in 1915 it was made one of the first eight divisions of the union.

Kerr was elected to Glasgow City Council, giving some support to the Red Clydeside movement, and served for a period as a bailie. He represented the Workers' Union on the executive of the Scottish Trades Union Congress (STUC), and was chair of the STUC in 1929. When the Workers' Union merged into the Transport and General Workers' Union, he continued working for that union, until his retirement.

Party political offices
Preceded by New position	Organiser of the Scottish Divisional Council of the Independent Labour Party; 1906–1909	Succeeded by George Dallas
Trade union offices
Preceded by John Nairn	Chair of the Scottish Trades Union Congress; 1929	Succeeded by Robert Watson
