= Harry Howarth =

Harry Howarth JP (3 August 1916 – 8 August 1969) was a British railway clerk and Labour politician who was the MP for Wellingborough from 1964 until his death.

Howarth was a native of Crompton in Lancashire, England, and was educated at Crompton House School in the locality. He worked on the railways, joining the Transport Salaried Staffs Association, but joined the Royal Air Force on the outbreak of the Second World War; after demobilization he returned to his old job. In 1945, he married Kathleen Rayner.

In 1950 Howarth joined the Labour Party. He served on the National Executive Committee of his Union from 1954 to 1960, and was elected to Wembley Borough Council from 1953 to 1956 and 1957 to 1960. He was a justice of the peace for the Gore Division of Middlesex from 1957. Howarth served as a magistrate in both the adult and juvenile courts.

At the 1964 general election, Howarth was narrowly elected as Labour MP for Wellingborough in Northamptonshire. In Parliament he was interested in transport, local government and Home Office matters. He was re-elected in the 1966 election with his majority increased to 2,233, but died in post at his home in Rickmansworth on 8 August 1969, aged 53.

Parliament of the United Kingdom
Preceded by Michael Hamilton	Member of Parliament for Wellingborough; 1964–1969	Succeeded by Peter Fry
