= Archibald James =

British Conservative Party politician and Royal Air Force pioneer

Wing Commander Archibald James MC

Member of Parliament for Wellingborough
- In office 27 October 1931 – 5 July 1945
- Preceded by: George Dallas
- Succeeded by: George Lindgren

Personal details
- Born: September 1893 Paddington, London, England
- Died: 5 May 1980 (aged 86) Worthing, West Sussex, England
- Party: Conservative
- Relations: David James (son)
- Education: Eton College
- Alma mater: Trinity College, Cambridge
- Civilian awards: Knight Bachelor

Military service
- Allegiance: United Kingdom
- Branch/service: British Army; Royal Air Force
- Years of service: 1914–1926
- Rank: Wing Commander
- Commands: No. 6 Squadron RFC
- Battles/wars: First World War
- Military awards: Military Cross

Wing Commander Sir Archibald William Henry James, MC (September 1893 – 5 May 1980) was a British Conservative Party politician and Royal Air Force pioneer.

Born in Paddington, London, the son of H. A. James of Herstmonceux Place, East Sussex, he was educated at Eton and Trinity College, Cambridge.

He married twice, to Bridget Guthrie (1919), with whom he had one son, David, and one daughter, Moira, whose married name became Ismay Cheape; and to Eugenia Stirling (1940), with whom he had two sons.

From 1914 to 1926 he served with the 3rd Hussars, the Royal Flying Corps and the Royal Air Force, rising to the rank of wing commander.

At the 1929 General Election, he stood as the Unionist candidate in the marginal constituency of Wellingborough in Northamptonshire, but lost to Labour's George Dallas.

He stood again in Wellingborough at the 1931 General Election, when the Labour vote collapsed nationally after Labour Prime Minister Ramsay MacDonald split his party by forming a National Government, and James won the seat on a swing of 16.6% of the vote.

He was narrowly re-elected at the 1935 General Election, when Dallas cut his majority to only 372 votes, and held the seat until 1945. In the Labour landslide at the 1945 General Election, he lost to Labour's George Lindgren, who took the seat with a majority of 5,990.

Whilst in Parliament he held the following offices of state: PPS to R. A. Butler at the India Office and Ministry of Labour (1936–38), Board of Education (1942) and Honorary First Secretary to the British Embassy in Madrid (1940–41).

After his stint in Parliament, James moved to Southern Rhodesia, where he owned land at Bita in the Marandellas district. In 1955 he bought Champions Farm at Thakeham in West Sussex. He died in Worthing, West Sussex, aged 86.

His son David followed in his footsteps as Conservative MP for Brighton Kemptown 1959–1964 and for North Dorset 1970–1979.

He was a convert to Catholicism.

Parliament of the United Kingdom
Preceded by George Dallas	Member of Parliament for Wellingborough; 1931–1945	Succeeded by George Lindgren
