= Arthur Gourd =

British trade union leader

Arthur George Gourd (born 1870) was a British trade union leader.

Born in Clapham, in London, Gourd joined the Independent Labour Party. He found work in the dockyards, and joined the Government Labourers' Union, a small union based around dock workers in Portsmouth. He was blacklisted for a time, due to his trade union activity, but was permitted to work in the yard again from 1904, and by 1914 was the union's secretary. He renamed the union as the National Union of Government Employees, and by 1920, it had grown to around 7,000 members. Gourd arranged for it to merge into the Workers' Union, becoming a full-time divisional organiser for the union. He also served as secretary of Portsmouth Trades Council.

Gourd's increased prominence led him to serve as secretary of the Admiralty Industrial Council, and then of the Miscellaneous Trades Joint Council. He also served on the WO Industrial Committee, and the Government Co-ordinating Committee. He spent some time as a Labour Party member of Portsmouth Borough Council, representing Kingston. At the 1922 United Kingdom general election, the union sponsored him as a candidate in Portsmouth Central; he took 21.4% of the vote, but only fourth place.

In 1929, the Workers' Union merged into the Transport and General Workers' Union, for which Gourd continued working.
