= Paul Stinchcombe =

British politician (born 1962)

Paul Stinchcombe KC

Member of Parliament for Wellingborough
- In office 1 May 1997 – 11 April 2005
- Preceded by: Peter Fry
- Succeeded by: Peter Bone

Personal details
- Born: 25 April 1962 (age 64) Haslemere, Surrey, England
- Party: Labour
- Spouse: Suzanne Gardiner
- Children: 3
- Education: Trinity College, Cambridge, Harvard Law School
- Occupation: Barrister

Paul David Stinchcombe KC (born 25 April 1962) is an English barrister and former Labour Party politician in the United Kingdom.

== Early life ==
Stinchcombe went to the Royal Grammar School, High Wycombe. At Trinity College, Cambridge, he studied law, gaining a double first MA. Stinchcombe went to Harvard Law School in Cambridge, Massachusetts, gaining an LLM. He became a barrister, working alongside Cherie Blair, specialising in environmental law. Stinchcombe was a councillor for the Brunswick ward in the London Borough of Camden from 1990 to 1994. He is a Christian Socialist who used Biblical imagery in his speeches, being also a speechwriter for Tony Blair as Prime Minister.

== Parliamentary career ==
Stinchcombe was the member of parliament (MP) for Wellingborough from 1997 until the 2005 general election when he lost his seat to Peter Bone of the Conservative Party. He had gained the seat from Peter Fry. His election was one of Labour's most surprise victories, with Stinchcombe only winning the seat by a small majority of 187 votes. In 2001 he joined the Commons environment, food and rural affairs select committee.

== Career at the bar ==
Immediately after the election Stinchcombe returned to his profession as a barrister. He was appointed, following the Bar Council's assessment, a QC in 2011. Stinchcombe moved chambers to 39 Essex Street in 2013.

Parliament of the United Kingdom
| Preceded by Peter Fry | Member of Parliament for Wellingborough; 1997–2005 | Succeeded by Peter Bone |
