= Peter Fry =

British politician

Sir Peter Fry

Member of Parliament for Wellingborough
- In office 4 December 1969 – 8 April 1997
- Preceded by: Harry Howarth
- Succeeded by: Paul Stinchcombe

Personal details
- Born: Peter Derek Fry; 26 May 1931 High Wycombe, England
- Died: 12 May 2015 (aged 83)
- Party: Conservative (after 1953)
- Other political affiliations: Labour (until 1951); Liberal (1951–1953)
- Spouses: Edna Roberts (m. 1958; div. 1982); Helen Mitchell (m. 1982)
- Children: 2
- Education: Worcester College, Oxford

Sir Peter Derek Fry (26 May 1931 – 12 May 2015) was a British Conservative politician who was the Member of Parliament for Wellingborough from a 1969 by-election until 1997.

== Background ==
Born in High Wycombe, Fry was educated at the Royal Grammar School, High Wycombe, and Worcester College, Oxford. He became an insurance broker and a director of the family retail clothing business.

== Political career ==
Fry was elected to the Buckinghamshire County Council in 1961. He contested the safe Labour seats Nottingham North in 1964 and Willesden East in 1966. He was elected a Member of Parliament at the 1969 Wellingborough by-election, and held the seat for nearly three decades. He was knighted in 1994.

Associated with the right wing of the Conservative Party, Fry was a Eurosceptic, who repeatedly voted against the government in 1992-1993 over its attempts to enshrine the Maastricht Treaty into UK law.

Fry owned a public relations firm during his time as an MP. During his stint on the Transport Select Committee from 1979 to 1992, his company's clientele included bus manufacturers, leading to concerns of a conflict of interest. He said that he always complied with the relevant rules in declaring his interests, and defended his PR work as a way to supplement his income.

Fry represented the seat until 1997, when he lost to Labour's Paul Stinchcombe by a margin of 187 votes. He subsequently became the Chairman of the Bingo Association, Chairman of the Federation of European Bingo Associations, and a trustee of the Responsibility in Gambling Trust. He lived in Cranford, Northamptonshire in his later years, and chaired the parish council from 2007 to 2011.

In 2012, Fry was interviewed as part of The History of Parliament's oral history project.

== Personal life ==
In 1958, Fry married Edna Roberts; the couple had two children and were married until divorcing in 1982. Later that year, he married Helen Mitchell, and they were married until his death on 12 May 2015, at the age of 83.

== Sources ==
- Times Guide to the House of Commons, Times Newspapers Limited, 1997

Parliament of the United Kingdom
Preceded by Harry Howarth	Member of Parliament for Wellingborough; 1969–1997	Succeeded by Paul Stinchcombe
