= Independent Complaints and Grievance Scheme =

Scheme set up by the British Houses of Parliament

The Independent Complaints and Grievance Scheme (ICGS) is a system set up by the British Houses of Parliament which investigates complaints about inappropriate behaviour, such as bullying, harassment or sexual misconduct, and provides advice to complainants. Any current or former member of the Parliamentary community is able to raise an issue with the ICGS. The scheme operates under the oversight of the Parliamentary Commissioner for Standards.

The Parliamentary Commissioner for Standards is the decision-maker in cases involving Members of Parliament. If the Commissioner decides that a respondent should be sanctioned, they refer the case to the Independent Expert Panel to determine the sanction.

The ICGS set up a Behaviour Code that MPs, Lords, visitors to or employees in parliament must abide by. It also runs a helpline for people to seek advice. The director is Jo Willows.

The body was formed in 2018 following the MeToo movement and was devised to tackle MPs' sexual misconduct.

In 2021, 388 people contacted the ICGS's helpline for advice, 293 in 2019–2020 and 285 in 2018–2019. In 2021, 48 investigations were carried out. The investigations were criticised for taking too long in a 2021 report by HR director Alison Stanley. The average time for an investigation to be concluded was 196 days.

== See also ==
- Independent Expert Panel
