= Robert Morley (trade unionist) =

British politician

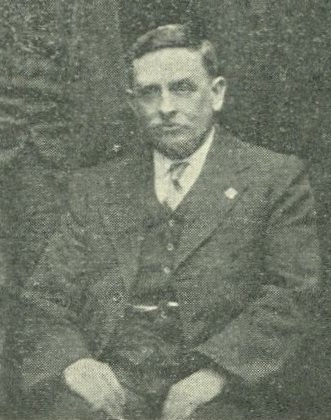
Morley in 1916

Robert Morley (20 June 1863 – 16 February 1931) was a British trade unionist and politician.

Born in Knaresborough, then in the West Riding of Yorkshire, Morley moved with his family to Copley when he was ten. There, he began working half-time at Edward Akroyd's worsted mill, while continuing his education. However, he later completed an apprenticeship as an iron moulder in Halifax. He became prominent in the Friendly Society of Iron Founders (FSIF), and was also active in his local Liberal Party.

Early in the 1890s, Morley became convinced of socialism. He was elected as the secretary of the Halifax Labour Union, then as the first secretary of the local branch of the Independent Labour Party. In this role, he worked closely with Mont Blatchford, but often came into conflict with John Lister, the party's national treasurer, who lived locally. He was also a regular speaker at the local Labour Church, and served on Halifax Trades Council.

In the late 1890s, Morley worked closely with Tom Mann to recruit local gasworkers to the Workers' Union. Through this activity, they secured recognition by the council, and Morley won election to the council in 1899, taking a place on its gasworks committee to further the gasworkers' cause. By 1900, it had become the Workers' Union's largest single branch, and Morley was elected as national president of the union, also working for it as a full-time organiser.

Morley supported the new Labour Representation Committee (LRC); he was organising secretary of the Wakefield LRC in 1903, and applied for FSIF sponsorship to contest the 1903 Barnard Castle by-election, though the membership instead voted to back Arthur Henderson, who won the seat. Morley lost his council seat in 1905, but won it back the year after, and was made an alderman in 1908. He also served as president of the trades council in 1910.

In 1913, Morley lost re-election as president of the Workers' Union, and was instead made its organiser for the unusual district of Yorkshire, north Lancashire and Herefordshire; this was later reduced to cover only Yorkshire. He was asked to stand for Labour in Colchester in the general election expected in 1914 or 1915, but World War I intervened, and when a general election was finally held, in 1918, he had secured his own union's sponsorship to stand in Doncaster. He was then made Prospective Parliamentary Candidate for Skipton; in 1920, he stood down, also resigning from the council, due to poor health. Despite this, he stood in Sheffield Park at the 1922 United Kingdom general election, narrowly failing to win the seat.

Morley' remained active in the Workers' Union, and its successor, the Transport and General Workers' Union, although, due to his worsening health, he principally represented the union on various boards and committees. Shortly before his death, he became a follower of the Neo-Zoroastrian Mazdaznan movement, although his funeral took place in a congregational church.

Trade union offices
Preceded by Charles Duncan	President of the Workers' Union; 1900–1913	Succeeded by John Beard
