= Independent Expert Panel =

British Parliamentary body

The Independent Expert Panel (IEP) is a body of the British Houses of Parliament. The Panel was established in 2020 in response to a report by Dame Laura Cox, and replaced the Committee on Standards. As recommended in the Cox report, it is entirely independent of Parliament and none of its members are MPs.

The Panel determines the appropriate sanction for Members of Parliament in cases involving bullying, harassment or sexual misconduct, referred to it by the Parliamentary Commissioner for Standards after investigation by the Independent Complaints and Grievance Scheme.

It also hears and adjudicates appeals made to it by respondents.

== See also ==
- Independent Complaints and Grievance Scheme
