= The Bingo Association =

The Bingo Association is the trade association of the licensed bingo industry in Great Britain, representing proprietors of bingo clubs licensed under The Gambling Act 2005.

== History ==
The Bingo Association has its origins in the Bingo Association of Great Britain (BAGB), which represented bingo operators and lobbied on regulatory issues. In the early 1990s, the association campaigned for changes to restrictions on bingo, including higher jackpot limits and greater freedom to advertise, as operators prepared for competition from the newly established National Lottery.

The present Bingo Association was formed in 1998 through the merger of the Bingo Association of Great Britain and the British Bingo Operators Association.

== Members ==
There are 88 proprietors in membership and membership profile ranges from the large operators, including Gala Bingo (130 clubs) and Mecca Bingo (87 clubs), to smaller operators like Majestic Bingo (16 clubs) and Carlton Leisure (13 clubs) and many single unit businesses.

== Role of the Association ==
The Association assists members by:

- Representing their interests to relevant third parties, including government, the regulator, research and academic organisations.
- Responding to formal consultations on issues affecting the industry.
- Providing support, guidance and information to members concerning operational, compliance and social responsibility issues.
- Providing the facility for annual age verification testing of member sites.
- Facilitating a national industry self-exclusion scheme.

The Association also manages the industry's relationship and activities with the agreed national charity: currently Variety, the children's charity.
