= Wellingborough and Rushden =

Parliamentary constituency in the United Kingdom, 1918 onwards

Coordinates: 52.30°N 0.70°W

- County constituency for the House of Commons
- Interactive map of boundaries since 2024
- Location within the East Midlands
- County: Northamptonshire
- Electorate: 76,669 (March 2020)
- Major settlements: Wellingborough, Rushden, Higham Ferrers, Irchester and Finedon

Current constituency
- Created: 1918 (as Wellingborough)
- Member of Parliament: Gen Kitchen (Labour)
- Created from: East Northamptonshire and North Northamptonshire

Wellingborough and Rushden is a constituency in Northamptonshire represented in the House of Commons of the UK Parliament. The seat is currently held by Labour MP Gen Kitchen, after the recall of MP Peter Bone in December 2023 which resulted in a by-election in February 2024.

Although the constituency had always, since its creation in 1918, contained the town of Rushden, it was formally known as Wellingborough up until the 2024 general election. Further to the 2023 review of Westminster constituencies, the Boundary Commission for England recommended that it be officially renamed Wellingborough and Rushden.

== History ==
This seat was created under the Representation of the People Act 1918.

Political history

Wellingborough's earliest years were left-leaning. Between 1964 and 2005, the seat kept on producing examples of bellwether results and rarely showed itself to be safe for more than one government term. Departing from this are two years where the result has defied the most common result nationwide, by leaning towards the Conservative Party, in 1974 (twice). Since 2010 it became a safe seat for the Conservatives until the 2024 by-election.

In the 2016 EU referendum, Wellingborough voted 62.4% leave (25,679 votes) to 37.6% remain (15,462 votes)

Prominent frontbenchers

Sir Geoffrey Shakespeare was a Lloyd-Georgist National Liberal who served in junior ministerial roles through much of the Second World War, including briefly as the Secretary for Overseas Trade in 1940.

== Boundaries ==
=== Historic (Wellingborough) ===
Map of boundaries 2010-2024

1918–1950: The Borough of Higham Ferrers, the Urban Districts of Finedon, Irthlingborough, Raunds, Rushden, and Wellingborough, the Rural District of Wellingborough, and in the Rural District of Thrapston the parishes of Chelveston cum Caldecott, Hargrave, and Stanwick.

1950–1974: The Borough of Higham Ferrers, the Urban Districts of Irthlingborough, Raunds, Rushden, and Wellingborough, the Rural District of Wellingborough, and in the Rural District of Oundle and Thrapston the civil parishes of Chelveston cum Caldecott and Hargrave.

1974–1983: The Borough of Higham Ferrers, the Urban Districts of Irthlingborough, Oundle, Raunds, Rushden, and Wellingborough, and the Rural Districts of Oundle and Thrapston, and Wellingborough.

1983–2010: The Borough of Wellingborough, and the District of East Northamptonshire wards of Higham Ferrers, Rushden East, Rushden North, Rushden South, and Rushden West.

2010–2021: The Borough of Wellingborough wards of Brickhill, Castle, Croyland, Finedon, Great Doddington and Wilby, Hemmingwell, Irchester, North, Queensway, Redwell East, Redwell West, South, Swanspool, and Wollaston, and the District of East Northamptonshire wards of Higham Ferrers, Rushden East, Rushden North, Rushden South, and Rushden West.

2021–2024: With effect from 1 April 2021, the Borough of Wellingborough and the District of East Northamptonshire were abolished and absorbed into the new unitary authority of North Northamptonshire. From that date, the constituency comprised the District of North Northamptonshire wards of Brickhill and Queensway, Croyland and Swanspool; Earls Barton (part), Finedon, Hatton Park, Higham Ferrers, Irchester, Irthlingborough, Rushden Pemberton West and Rushden South.

=== Current (Wellingborough and Rushden) ===
Following the 2023 review of Westminster constituencies, which came into effect for the 2024 general election, the constituency was reduced in size in order to bring it within the electoral quota by transferring the parts of the Earls Barton ward to Daventry and parts of the Irchester ward to South Northamptonshire. To partly compensate, parts of the Irthlingborough ward (including the town of Irthlingborough) were transferred in from Corby.

Further to a local government boundary review which came into effect in May 2025, the constituency now comprises the following wards of North Northamptonshire:

- Brickhill and Queensway; Croyland and Swanspool; Finedon; Hatton Park (most); Higham Ferrers; Irchester (part); Irthlingborough (most); Rushden Lakes; Rushden South; Victoria.

The constituency is named after the towns of Wellingborough and Rushden. It also includes the small town of Higham Ferrers, which was itself a borough constituency also named Higham Ferrers until its abolition as one of the rotten boroughs in 1832.

== Constituency profile ==
Strengths in local industries here or in neighbouring Northampton and Kettering include in printing, logistics and distribution, automotive (assembly and design), construction, food processing and advanced engineering sectors. Despite this, a decline in the traditional local industries such as quarrying, furniture making and textiles pushes workless claimants who were registered jobseekers in November 2012 higher than the national (and regional) average of 3.8%, at 4.5% of the population based on a statistical compilation by The Guardian.

== Members of Parliament ==
East Northamptonshire and North Northamptonshire prior to 1918

Election	Member	Party
1918	Walter Smith	Labour
1922	Geoffrey Shakespeare	National Liberal
1923	William Cove	Labour
1929	George Dallas	Labour
1931	Archibald James	Conservative
1945	George Lindgren	Labour
1959	Michael Hamilton	Conservative
1964	Harry Howarth	Labour
1969 by-election	Peter Fry	Conservative
1997	Paul Stinchcombe	Labour
2005	Peter Bone	Conservative
2023	Peter Bone	Independent
2024 by-election	Gen Kitchen	Labour
Renamed as Wellingborough and Rushden
2024	Gen Kitchen	Labour

== Elections ==
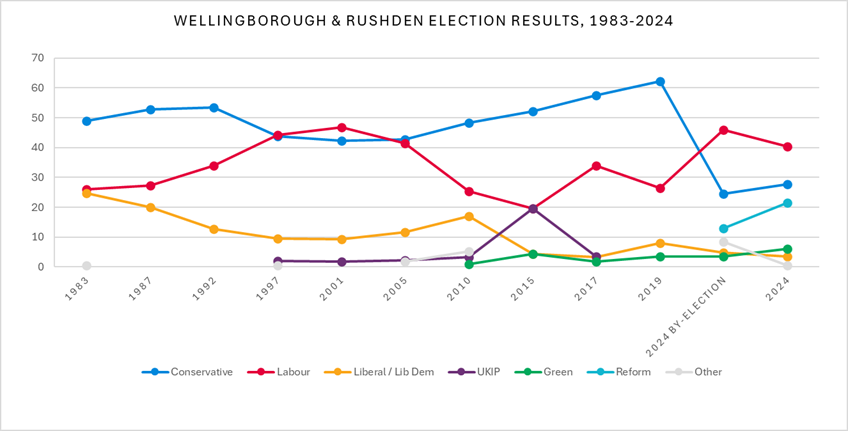
Wellingborough & Rushden election results 1983-2024

=== Elections in the 2020s ===
General election 2024: Wellingborough and Rushden
Party	Candidate	Votes	%	±%
Labour	Gen Kitchen	17,734	40.3	+12.0
Conservative	David Goss	12,248	27.8	−34.6
Reform	Ben Habib	9,456	21.5	N/A
Green	Paul Mannion	2,704	6.1	+3.4
Liberal Democrats	Christopher Townsend	1,570	3.6	−3.1
SDP	Jeremy Brittin	273	0.6	N/A
Majority		5,486	12.5	N/A
Turnout		43,985	56.9	▼4.7
Registered electors		77,559		
Labour gain from Conservative		Swing	▲23.3	

Vote share changes for the 2024 election are compared to the notional results from the 2019 election, not the 2024 by-election.

2024 Wellingborough by-election
Party	Candidate	Votes	%	±%
Labour	Gen Kitchen	13,844	45.9	+19.4
Conservative	Helen Harrison	7,408	24.6	−37.6
Reform	Ben Habib	3,919	13.0	New
Liberal Democrats	Ana Gunn	1,422	4.7	−3.2
Independent	Marion Turner-Hawes	1,115	3.7	New
Green	Will Morris	1,020	3.4	−0.1
Independent	Kevin Watts	533	1.8	New
Britain First	Alex Merola	477	1.6	New
Monster Raving Loony	Nick the Flying Brick	217	0.7	New
Independent	Andre Pyne-Bailey	172	0.6	New
Independent	Ankit Post-Mortem	18	0.1	New
Majority		6,436	21.3	N/A
Turnout		30,145	38.0	−26.3
Registered electors		79,376		
Labour gain from Conservative		Swing	+28.5	

=== Elections in the 2010s ===
2019 general election: Wellingborough
Party	Candidate	Votes	%	±%
Conservative	Peter Bone	32,277	62.2	+4.8
Labour	Andrea Watts	13,737	26.5	–7.5
Liberal Democrats	Suzanna Austin	4,078	7.9	+4.6
Green	Marion Turner-Hawes	1,821	3.5	+1.7
Majority		18,540	35.7	+12.3
Turnout		51,913	64.3	–2.9
Conservative hold		Swing	+6.15	

2017 general election: Wellingborough
Party	Candidate	Votes	%	±%
Conservative	Peter Bone	30,579	57.4	+5.3
Labour	Andrea Watts	18,119	34.0	+14.5
UKIP	Alan Shipham	1,804	3.4	–16.2
Liberal Democrats	Chris Nelson	1,782	3.3	–1.1
Green	Jonathan Hornett	956	1.8	–2.6
Majority		12,460	23.4	–9.1
Turnout		53,240	67.2	+1.8
Conservative hold		Swing	–4.55	

2015 general election: Wellingborough
Party	Candidate	Votes	%	±%
Conservative	Peter Bone	26,265	52.1	+3.9
UKIP	Jonathan Munday	9,868	19.6	+16.4
Labour	Richard Garvie^{1}	9,839	19.5	–5.9
Liberal Democrats	Chris Nelson	2,240	4.4	–12.7
Green	Marion-Turner-Hawes	2,218	4.4	+3.5
Majority		16,397	32.5	+9.7
Turnout		50,430	65.4	–1.8
Conservative hold		Swing	–6.3	

^{1}: After nominations were closed, Garvie was suspended from the Labour Party after he was convicted of fraud after buying £900 of train tickets with a closed bank account. He still appeared on ballot papers as Labour.

2010 general election: Wellingborough
Party	Candidate	Votes	%	±%
Conservative	Peter Bone	24,918	48.2	+5.5
Labour	Jayne Buckland	13,131	25.4	–16.0
Liberal Democrats	Kevin Barron	8,848	17.1	+5.6
UKIP	Adrian Haynes	1,636	3.2	+0.9
BNP	Rob Walker	1,596	3.1	New
English Democrat	Terry Spencer	530	1.0	New
Green	Jonathan Hornett	480	0.9	New
TUSC	Paul Crofts	249	0.5	New
Independent	Gary Donaldson	240	0.5	New
Independent	Marcus Lavin	33	0.1	New
Majority		11,787	22.8	+21.5
Turnout		51,661	67.2	+1.4
Conservative hold		Swing	+10.8	

=== Elections in the 2000s ===
2005 general election: Wellingborough
Party	Candidate	Votes	%	±%
Conservative	Peter Bone	22,674	42.8	+0.6
Labour	Paul Stinchcombe	21,987	41.5	–5.3
Liberal Democrats	Richard Church	6,147	11.6	+2.3
UKIP	James Wrench	1,214	2.3	+0.6
Veritas	Nicholas Alex	749	1.4	New
Socialist Labour	Andy Dickson	234	0.4	New
Majority		687	1.3	N/A
Turnout		53,005	66.5	+2.4
Conservative gain from Labour		Swing	+2.9	

2001 general election: Wellingborough
Party	Candidate	Votes	%	±%
Labour	Paul Stinchcombe	23,867	46.8	+2.6
Conservative	Peter Bone	21,512	42.2	–1.6
Liberal Democrats	Peter Gaskell	4,763	9.3	–0.1
UKIP	Tony Ellwood	864	1.7	−0.4
Majority		2,355	4.6	+4.2
Turnout		51,006	64.1	–10.7
Labour hold		Swing	+2.1	

=== Elections in the 1990s ===
1997 general election: Wellingborough
Party	Candidate	Votes	%	±%
Labour	Paul Stinchcombe	24,854	44.2	+10.3
Conservative	Peter Fry	24,667	43.8	–9.6
Liberal Democrats	Peter Smith	5,279	9.4	–3.4
UKIP	Tony Ellwood	1,192	2.1	New
Natural Law	Annie Lorys	297	0.5	New
Majority		187	0.4	N/A
Turnout		56,289	74.8	–7.1
Labour gain from Conservative		Swing	+9.9	

1992 general election: Wellingborough
Party	Candidate	Votes	%	±%
Conservative	Peter Fry	32,302	53.4	+0.7
Labour	Phil Sawford	20,486	33.9	+6.7
Liberal Democrats	Julie Trevor	7,714	12.8	–7.3
Majority		11,816	19.5	–6.0
Turnout		60,502	81.9	
Conservative hold		Swing	–3.0	

=== Elections in the 1980s ===
1987 general election: Wellingborough
Party	Candidate	Votes	%	±%
Conservative	Peter Fry	29,038	52.7	+3.8
Labour	James Currie	14,968	27.2	+1.2
Liberal	Leslie Stringer	11,047	20.1	–4.6
Majority		14,070	25.5	+2.6
Turnout		55,053		
Conservative hold		Swing	+1.3	

1983 general election: Wellingborough
Party	Candidate	Votes	%	±%
Conservative	Peter Fry	25,715	48.9	–3.4
Labour	John H. Mann	13,659	26.0	–8.9
Liberal	Leslie Stringer	12,994	24.7	+12.9
Independent	D.M.P. Garnett	228	0.4	+0.1
Majority		12,056	22.9	+5.5
Turnout		52,596		
Conservative hold		Swing	+2.8	

=== Elections in the 1970s ===
1979 general election: Wellingborough
Party	Candidate	Votes	%	±%
Conservative	Peter Fry	37,812	52.3	+9.5
Labour	D.A. Forwood	25,278	34.9	–5.3
Liberal	L.E. Stringer	8,506	11.8	–5.2
National Front	S.F. Wright	529	0.7	New
Independent	D.M.P. Garnett	228	0.3	New
Majority		12,534	17.4	+14.8
Turnout		72,353	81.25	+1.6
Conservative hold		Swing	+7.4	

October 1974 general election: Wellingborough
Party	Candidate	Votes	%	±%
Conservative	Peter Fry	29,078	42.8	+2.3
Labour	John H. Mann	27,320	40.2	+2.9
Liberal	Penelope Jessel	11,500	17.0	–3.9
Majority		1,758	2.6	–0.6
Turnout		67,898	79.61	–5.39
Conservative hold		Swing	–0.3	

February 1974 general election: Wellingborough
Party	Candidate	Votes	%	±%
Conservative	Peter Fry	29,099	40.5	–11.7
Labour	John H. Mann	26,829	37.3	–10.5
Liberal	Penelope Jessel	15,049	20.9	New
Ind. Conservative	D.T. James	897	1.2	New
Majority		2,720	3.2	–1.3
Turnout		71,874	85.00	–1.34
Conservative hold		Swing	–0.6	

1970 general election: Wellingborough
Party	Candidate	Votes	%	±%
Conservative	Peter Fry	27,459	52.2	+4.6
Labour	John H. Mann	25,107	47.8	–4.6
Majority		2,352	4.4	N/A
Turnout		52,566	81.34	–5.12
Conservative hold		Swing	+4.6	

=== Elections in the 1960s ===
1969 Wellingborough by-election
Party	Candidate	Votes	%	±%
Conservative	Peter Fry	22,548	54.4	+6.8
Labour	John H. Mann	16,499	39.8	–7.8
Independent	M.P. Coney	2,421	5.8	New
Majority		6,049	14.6	N/A
Turnout		41,468		
Conservative gain from Labour		Swing	+7.3	

1966 general election: Wellingborough
Party	Candidate	Votes	%	±%
Labour	Harry Howarth	24,705	52.4	+10.1
Conservative	John Lawson Leatham	22,472	47.6	+5.4
Majority		2,233	4.8	+4.7
Turnout		54,566	86.46	–0.6
Labour hold		Swing		

1964 general election: Wellingborough
Party	Candidate	Votes	%	±%
Labour	Harry Howarth	19,592	42.26	–7.17
Conservative	Michael Hamilton	19,545	42.16	–8.51
Liberal	Philip Arthur John Pettit	7,227	15.59	New
Majority		47	0.10	N/A
Turnout		46,364	87.11	
Labour gain from Conservative		Swing		

=== Elections in the 1950s ===
1959 general election: Wellingborough
Party	Candidate	Votes	%	±%
Conservative	Michael Hamilton	22,964	50.67	+1.61
Labour	George Lindgren	22,358	49.33	–1.61
Majority		606	1.34	N/A
Turnout		45,322	86.72	
Conservative gain from Labour		Swing	+1.61	

1955 general election: Wellingborough
Party	Candidate	Votes	%	±%
Labour	George Lindgren	22,745	51.04	–1.35
Conservative	Arthur Jones	21,819	48.96	+1.35
Majority		926	2.08	
Turnout		44,564	86.01	
Labour hold		Swing	–1.35	

1951 general election: Wellingborough
Party	Candidate	Votes	%	±%
Labour	George Lindgren	24,113	52.39	+5.29
Conservative	F Richard Parsons	21,912	47.61	+19.15
Majority		2,201	4.78	
Turnout		46,025	88.38	
Labour hold		Swing		

1950 general election: Wellingborough
Party	Candidate	Votes	%	±%
Labour	George Lindgren	21,640	47.10	–10.61
Conservative	Jaspar Carlisle Sayer	13,075	28.46	–13.83
Liberal	Edwin Malindine	11,227	24.44	New
Majority		8,565	18.64	
Turnout		45,942	89.51	
Labour hold		Swing		

=== Elections in the 1940s ===
1945 general election: Wellingborough
Party	Candidate	Votes	%	±%
Labour	George Lindgren	22,416	57.71	
Conservative	Archibald James	16,426	42.29	
Majority		5,990	15.42	N/A
Turnout		38,842	74.39	
Labour gain from Conservative		Swing		

=== Elections in the 1930s ===
1935 general election: Wellingborough
Party	Candidate	Votes	%	±%
Conservative	Archibald James	18,085	50.52	
Labour	George Dallas	17,713	49.48	
Majority		372	1.04	
Turnout		35,798	77.26	
Conservative hold		Swing		

1931 general election: Wellingborough
Party	Candidate	Votes	%	±%
Conservative	Archibald James	22,127	61.02	
Labour	George Dallas	14,137	38.98	
Majority		7,990	22.04	N/A
Turnout		36,264	81.24	
Conservative gain from Labour		Swing		

=== Elections in the 1920s ===
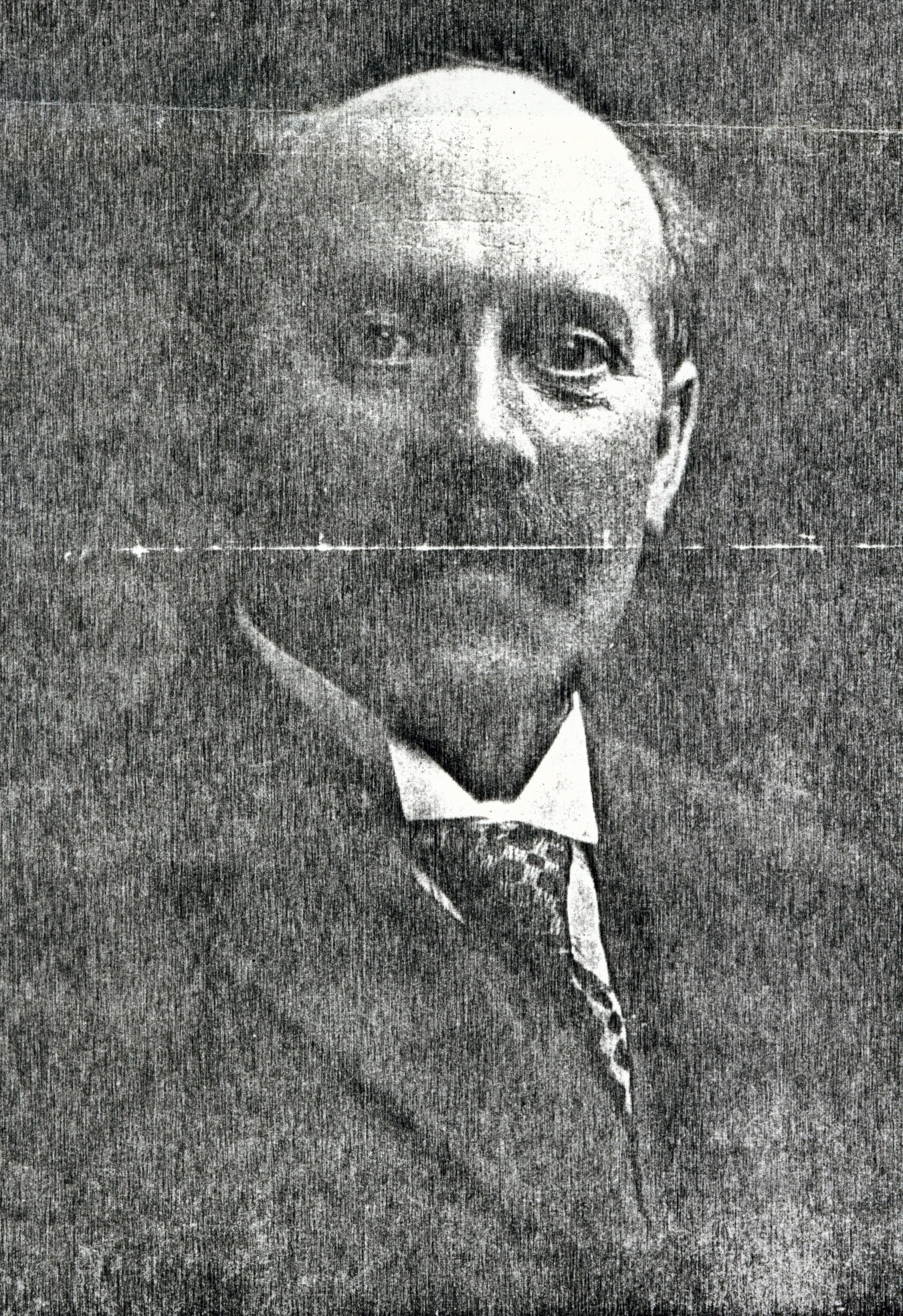
G. Dallas

1929 general election: Wellingborough
Party	Candidate	Votes	%	±%
Labour	George Dallas	15,300	42.2	+2.2
Liberal	Richard Pattinson Winfrey	11,255	31.0	+2.2
Unionist	Archibald James	9,703	26.8	–4.4
Majority		4,045	11.2	+2.4
Turnout		36,258	83.3	–0.7
Registered electors		43,548		
Labour hold		Swing	+0.0	

1924 general election: Wellingborough
Party	Candidate	Votes	%	±%
Labour	William Cove	11,381	40.0	−2.1
Unionist	Ralph A Raphael	8,900	31.2	+5.8
Liberal	Humphrey Mackworth Paul	8,223	28.8	–3.7
Majority		2,481	8.8	–0.8
Turnout		28,504	84.0	+4.1
Registered electors		33,934		
Labour hold		Swing	–4.0	

1923 general election: Wellingborough
Party	Candidate	Votes	%	±%
Labour	William Cove	11,175	42.1	–0.3
Liberal	Geoffrey Shakespeare	8,638	32.5	–25.1
Unionist	Robert Massy-Dawson Sanders	6,747	25.4	New
Majority		2,537	9.6	N/A
Turnout		26,560	79.9	+0.5
Registered electors		33,226		
Labour gain from Liberal		Swing	+12.4	

1922 general election: Wellingborough
Party	Candidate	Votes	%	±%
National Liberal	Geoffrey Shakespeare	14,995	57.6	+10.1
Labour	Walter Smith	11,057	42.4	–8.1
Majority		3,938	15.2	N/A
Turnout		26,052	79.4	+17.5
Registered electors		32,820		
National Liberal gain from Labour		Swing		

=== Elections in the 1910s ===
1918 general election: Wellingborough
Party		Candidate	Votes	%	±%
	Labour	Walter Smith	10,290	52.5	
C	Liberal	Milner Gray	9,313	47.5	
Majority			977	5.0	
Turnout			19,603	61.9	
Registered electors			31,669		
	Labour win (new seat)				
C indicates candidate endorsed by the coalition government.

== See also ==
- List of parliamentary constituencies in Northamptonshire

== Sources ==
- A history of Britain's parliamentary constituencies / edited by Jacques A. Arnold. The constituencies of the county of Northamptonshire..
