= 1969 Wellingborough by-election =

UK by-election

The 1969 Wellingborough by-election of 4 December 1969 was held following the death of Labour Member of Parliament (MP) Harry Howarth earlier that year. The seat was won by Peter Fry of the Conservative Party.

== Result ==
Wellingborough by-election, 1969
Party	Candidate	Votes	%	±%
Conservative	Peter Fry	22,548	54.37	+6.74
Labour	John Mann	16,499	39.79	−12.58
Independent	Michael Coney	2,421	5.84	New
Majority		6,049	14.58	N/A
Turnout		41,468		
Conservative gain from Labour		Swing	+7.3	

== Previous result ==
General election 1966: Wellingborough
Party	Candidate	Votes	%	±%
Labour	Harry Howarth	24,705	52.37	+10.1
Conservative	JL Leatham	22,472	47.63	+5.4
Majority		2,233	4.74	+4.7
Turnout		47,177	86.46	−0.6
Labour hold		Swing		
