= Bradlaugh Riots =

1874 election riot in Northampton, England

- Date: 6 October 1874
- Location: Northampton Market Square and surrounding streets, Northampton, England
- Caused by: Defeat of Charles Bradlaugh at the 1874 Northampton by-election; belief among his supporters that the result was unfair
- Methods: Rioting, stone-throwing, property damage
- Result: Crowd dispersed after the Riot Act was read and soldiers fired over the heads of the crowd

Parties
| Supporters of Charles Bradlaugh | Borough police; British Army detachment |

The Bradlaugh Riots (also referred to as the Bradlaugh Riot) were a violent disturbance that took place in Northampton, England, on the night of 6 October 1874, following the defeat of the radical candidate Charles Bradlaugh at the 1874 Northampton by-election. Crowds of Bradlaugh's supporters, angered by the result, attacked buildings around the town's Market Square, tearing up cobblestones to break windows. The mayor read the Riot Act, and the disturbance was eventually suppressed with the assistance of soldiers, who fired shots over the heads of the crowd.

== Background ==
Northampton in the mid-19th century was a two-member parliamentary borough with a strong radical and Nonconformist tradition, particularly among the town's shoemakers. Charles Bradlaugh, a prominent atheist, republican and co-founder of the National Secular Society, first contested the borough in 1868 and stood again, unsuccessfully, at the general election of February 1874, which was called while he was on a lecture tour of the United States. His candidatures caused a lasting split in the local Liberal party, much of whose establishment opposed him.

Later in 1874, the death of the sitting Liberal MP Charles Gilpin triggered a by-election, held on 6 October 1874. Bradlaugh stood as a radical candidate against the official Liberal, William Fowler, and the Conservative, Charles George Merewether. The campaign was bitter, with Fowler attacking Bradlaugh's character and morality.

== The riot ==
The split in the Liberal vote allowed Merewether to win the seat. The declared result gave Merewether 2,171 votes, Fowler 1,836 and Bradlaugh 1,766, leaving Bradlaugh at the bottom of the poll.

Large numbers of Bradlaugh's supporters had gathered in the town centre during the day, and several thousand people were present in front of the town hall when the result was announced by the town crier. Contemporary press reports state that the declaration was met with hooting, and that Bradlaugh himself appealed to his followers to go home peaceably, which the crowd refused to do. A large crowd then assembled on the Market Square and attacked the Lord Palmerston public house, which had served as Fowler's campaign headquarters, with stones; the police attempted, unsuccessfully, to disperse the rioters.

According to the pub historian Dave Knibb, the neighbouring Herald printing office and the offices of the Northampton Mercury were also attacked, the town's newspapers being blamed by rioters for Bradlaugh's defeat, with the Herald regarded as a Conservative publication. Cobblestones were torn up from the surface of the Market Square and used to smash windows. The mayor read the Riot Act, and the military were summoned from their barracks, although procedural requirements — including a written summons from the mayor and written permission from the commanding officer at Weedon barracks — caused delays in their deployment. Soldiers ultimately fired shots over the heads of the crowd to disperse it.

== Aftermath and legacy ==
Bradlaugh departed for a lecture tour of the United States on the night of the poll. Despite his repeated defeats, his support in the town continued to grow, and he was eventually elected as one of Northampton's MPs at the 1880 general election. His subsequent refusal to swear a religious oath of allegiance led to a prolonged constitutional struggle and ultimately to the Oaths Act 1888, which established the right of members of Parliament to affirm.

A cobblestone thrown during the riot is preserved in the collection of Northampton Museum and Art Gallery. The 150th anniversary of the riot was marked in October 2024 with a talk at the museum organised with the Charles Bradlaugh Society. The Lord Palmerston pub, the first target of the rioters, was renamed the Lamplighter in 1973 and closed in 1980.

== See also ==
- Charles Bradlaugh
- 1874 Northampton by-election
- Northampton Market Square
