= 1860 Birthday Honours =

Appointments by Queen Victoria

The 1860 Birthday Honours were appointments by Queen Victoria to various orders and honours to reward and highlight good works by citizens of the British Empire. The appointments were made to celebrate the official birthday of the Queen, and were published in The London Gazette on 18 May 1860.

The recipients of honours are displayed here as they were styled before their new honour, and arranged by honour, with classes (Knight, Knight Grand Cross, etc.) and then divisions (Military, Civil, etc.) as appropriate.

== United Kingdom and British Empire ==
=== The Most Honourable Order of the Bath ===
==== Knight Grand Cross of the Order of the Bath (GCB) ====
===== Military Division =====
Royal Navy

- Admiral of the Fleet Sir John West KCB
- Admiral Sir William Hall Gage Kt Vice-Admiral of the United Kingdom
- Admiral Sir Francis William Austen KCB
- General Sir James Douglas KCB
- General Sir George Scovell KCB
- General the Lord Downes KCB
- Admiral Sir Thomas John Cochrane KCB
- Admiral Sir George Francis Seymour KCB

Army

- General Sir Frederick Stovin KCB
- General Sir James Fergusson KCB
- Lieutenant-General Sir John Bell KCB

==== Knight Commander of the Order of the Bath (KCB) ====
===== Military Division =====
Royal Navy

- Vice-Admiral Arthur Fanshawe CB
- Vice-Admiral Provo William Parry Wallis
- Rear-Admiral Robert Lambert Baynes CB

Army

- General the Honourable Henry Murray CB
- Lieutenant-General Philip Bainbrigge CB
- Lieutenant-General Thomas Erskine Napier CB
- Lieutenant-General the Honourable Charles Gore CB
- Lieutenant-General Edward Charles Whinyates CB
- Lieutenant-General George Judd Harding CB

Royal Marines

- Lieutenant-General Samuel Burdon Ellis CB

===== Civil Division =====
Indian Service

- Frederick James Halliday, late Lieutenant-Governor of Bengal
- Sir Robert North Collie Hamilton Bt late Political Agent in Central India
- Major-General Richard James Holwell Birch CB Secretary to the Government of India in the Military Department
- Colonel Peter Melvill Melvill, Secretary to the Government of Bombay in the Military and Naval Departments
- Lieutenant-Colonel Herbert Benjamin Edwardes CB Commissioner of Peshawur

==== Companion of the Order of the Bath (CB) ====
===== Civil Division =====
- Thomas Erskine May, Clerk Assistant of the House of Commons

Colonial Service

- Philip Edmond Wodehouse, Governor and Commander-in-Chief in and over the Colony of British Guiana
- James Walker, Colonial Secretary for the Island of Barbados
- Colonel Stephen John Hill, Captain-General and Governor-in-Chief in and over the Colony of Sierra Leone
- Edward Jordan, President of the Privy Council of the Island of Jamaica
- Major Mathew Richmond, sometime Superintendent at Wellington and Nelson, in New Zealand

Indian Service

- Edward Anderton Reade, Bengal Civil Service, Member of the Sudder Board of Revenue
- Donald Friell McLeod, Bengal Civil Service, Financial Commissioner, Punjab
- John Cracroft Wilson, Bengal Civil Service, Judge of Moradabad
- Edward Thornton, Bengal Civil Service, Commissioner of the Jhelum Division, Punjab
- Henry Carre Tucker, Bengal Civil Service, Commissioner of Benares
- George Udny Yule, Bengal Civil Service, Commissioner of Bhaugulpore
- Edward Alexander Samuells, Bengal Civil Service, Commissioner of Patna
- Robert Alexander, Bengal Civil Service, Commissioner of Rohilcund
- Frederick Bebb Gubbins, Bengal Civil Service, Commissioner of Benares
- Arthur Austin Roberts, Bengal Civil Service, Commissioner of Lahore
- George Carnac Barnes, Bengal Civil Service, Commissioner of the Cis-Sutlej States
- Arthur Herbert Cocks, Bengal Civil Service, Judge of Mynpoorie
- Charles John Wingfield, Bengal Civil Service, Commissioner of Goruckpore
- Samuel Wauchope, Bengal Civil Service, Commissioner of Police, Calcutta
- Brand Sapte, Bengal Civil Service, Magistrate of Bulandshahr
- Alonzo Money, Bengal Civil Service, Magistrate of Shahabad and Gya
- Francis Otway Mayne, Bengal Civil Service, Magistrate of Banda
- George Ebenezer Wilson Couper, Bengal Civil Service, Secretary to the Chief Commissioner, Oude
- Robert Henry Dunlop, Bengal Civil Service, Magistrate of Meerut
- William Ashburner Forbes, Bengal Civil Service, Deputy Commissioner, Oude
- Frederick Henry Cooper, Bengal Civil Service, Deputy Commissioner, Umritsur
- George Henry Mildmay Ricketts, Bengal Civil Service, Deputy Commissioner, Loodianah
- John Henry Bax, Bengal Civil Service, Joint Magistrate, Ghazeepore
- Thomas Douglas Forsyth, Bengal Civil Service, Deputy Commissioner, Umballah
- Allan Octavian Hume, Bengal Civil Service, Magistrate of Etawah
- Herwald Craufurd Wake, Bengal Civil Service, Magistrate of Shahabad
- Brigadier-General George St. Patrick Lawrence, Bengal Cavalry, Agent to Her Majesty's Viceroy and Governor-General of India in Rajpootana
- Colonel Sir Richard Campbell Shakespear Kt Bengal Artillery, Resident at Baroda
- Lieutenant-Colonel Cuthbert Davidson, Bengal Infantry, Resident at Hyderabad
- Lieutenant-Colonel Frederick Carleton Marsden, Bengal Retired List, Deputy Commissioner, Ferozepore
- Major Walter Coningsby Erskine, Bengal Infantry, Commissioner of Saugor
- Major John Reid Becher, Bengal Engineers, Deputy Commissioner, Hazara
- Major Henry Ramsay, Bengal Infantry, Commissioner of Kumaon
- Major George Walter Williams, Bengal Infantry, Commanding Meerut Volunteers
- Major Richard Charles Lawrence, Bengal Infantry, Commanding the Lahore Police and Cashmere Contingent
- Major John William Carnegie, Bengal Infantry, Deputy Commissioner, Oude
- Major William Wilberforce Harris Greathed, Bengal Engineers
- Captain Hugh Rees James, Bengal Infantry, Deputy Commissioner, Peshawur
- Captain Benjamin Henderson, Bengal Infantry, Deputy Commissioner, Kohat
- Robert Staunton Ellis, Madras Civil Service, Deputy Commissioner, Nagpore
- Major Samuel Charters Macpherson, Madras Infantry, Political Agent, Gwalior
- Major Francis Wingrave Pinkney, Madras Infantry, Commissioner of Jhansi
- Captain William Hindley Crichton, Madras Infantry, Deputy Commissioner, Nagpore
- Captain Charles Eliot, Madras Artillery, Deputy Commissioner, Nagpore
- Lieutenant John William Willoughby Osborne, Madras Infantry, Political Agent in Rewah
- John Nugent Rose, Bombay Civil Service, Chief Civil Officer, Sattara
- Major William Lockyer Merewether, Bombay Infantry, Political Agent, Scinde Frontier
