= Tunnels of Northampton =

Coordinates: 52.237°N 0.896°W

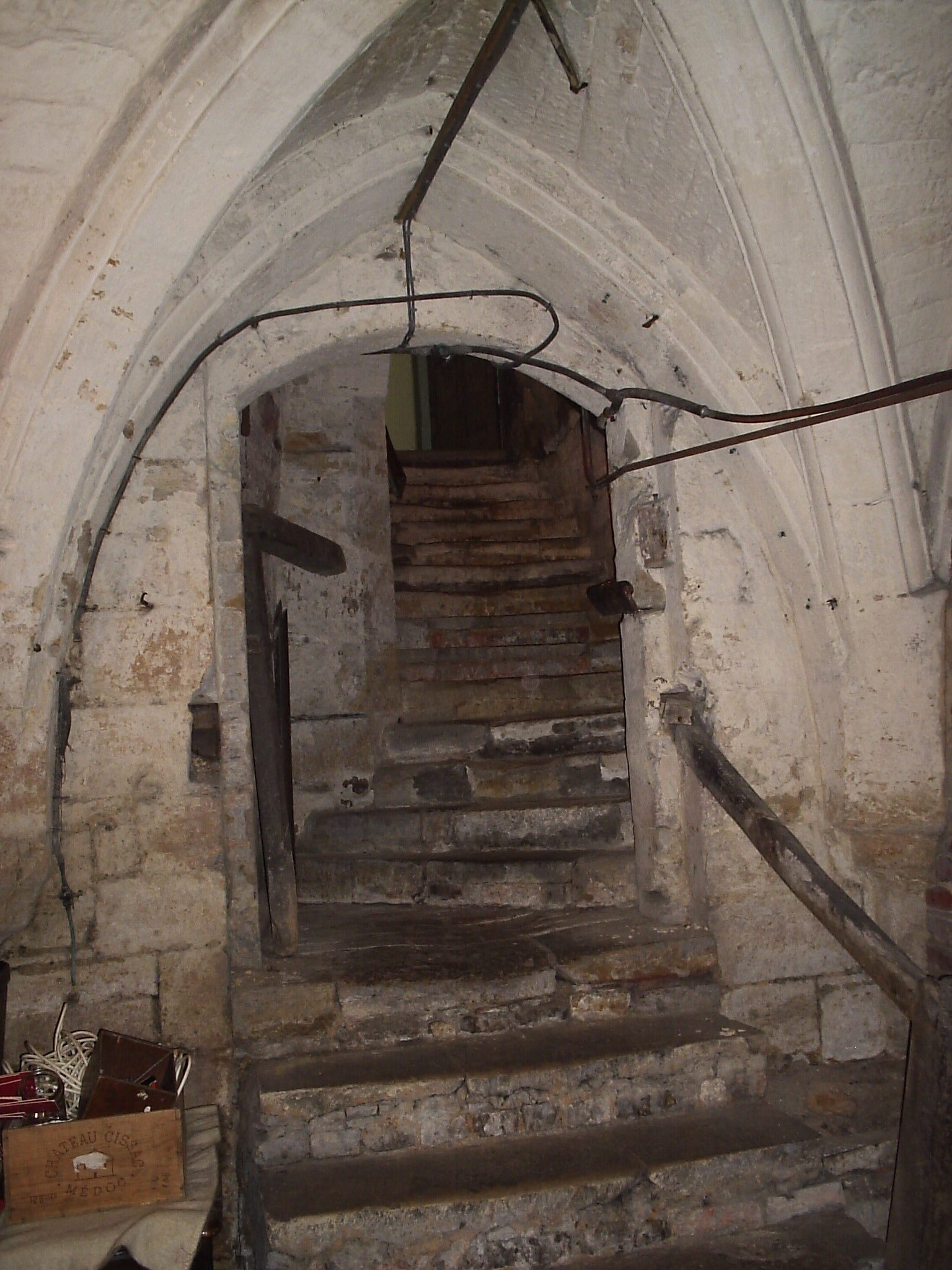
Cellars at the Northampton & County Club

According to some sources several tunnels run underneath the streets of the town of Northampton in England, along with many medieval cellars and ancient crypts. Much of the present town's development took place during medieval times, and some cellars from the period remain. Although some of these chambers are connected and others may have been connected in the past, it is doubtful if they ever have formed an extensive connected network.

West Northamptonshire District Council say that to their knowledge there is only one tunnel which runs from All Saints Church across Mercers Row. The Northampton Chronicle and Echo published a plan of this provided by the Council showing the tunnel beginning on the north side of the church in Mercers Row where there was a man hole cover. The tunnel was then shown running eastwards across the mouth of Wood Hill where it turned north across the end of Abington Street into the Market Square on the east side just north of the junction with Abington Street The newspaper further reported that cellars which form part of the tunnel shown on the plan, along with other cellars nearby were used as air raid shelters during World War 2. An employee of the Shipmans Public House said the pub had a cellar with a door in it and there was a tunnel behind the door.

Many of the medieval cellars are thought to have originated from the church buildings, that today are centred on All Saints Church – for instance underneath the Northampton & County Club in George Row (opposite the church) some fine vaulted cellars can be seen.

There are similar tunnels on the other side of the church at Drum Lane – underneath the Shipman's public house. John Speed's map of Northampton from 1610 shows that the church was then the largest landowner in the town.

Clashes took place over the years between the church and the monarchy – such as the banning of markets being held in the churchyards. It is thought that some of these tunnels were established as escape routes for clergy during times of trouble. The various religious houses in early times were found at all the main 8 compass points – giving rise to a series of radial tunnels heading out from All Saints Church at the centre of town to the various houses.

Some tunnels had a more mundane function – channelling water from the springs on what is now the Racecourse and Springfield into the town centre. These conduits were known respectively as the Great and the Little Conduits.

Northampton Castle was once one of the most important in the country and there is a suggestion that at least one tunnel linked the castle to All Saints Church – and even that such a tunnel might have been utilised by Thomas Becket in his escape from the castle and the town on his way to France.

Another theory suggests that the cellars may have been used as a refuge from town fires common in timbered medieval towns such as Northampton – as seen in 1516.

It is also thought that a tunnel may have allowed the nuns of Delapré Abbey, on the outskirts of the town to escape the Battle of Northampton (1460) which raged in their grounds. It is thought that this tunnel ran via St John's Church at the bottom of Bridge Street.
