= Barar, Punjab =

Barar Village is located in Ajnala tehsil of Amritsar district in Punjab. It is 20 km away from sub-district headquarter Ajnala. The population is 2,318 - 1,125 males and 1,103 females. Pincode of Barar village is 143108.
