= Joans Mohar =

Village in Punjab, India

Joans Mohar is a village in the Amritsar district of Punjab, India. It is about 20 km away from the holy city of Amritsar, and 7 km away from Ajnala tehsil. Joans Mohar's leader's name is Whelben Kozkan, an Indian politician known for his knowledge in the medical field.
