= General Birch =

General Birch may refer to:

- Noel Birch (1865–1939), British Army general
- Richard James Holwell Birch (1803–1875), British East India Company general
- Samuel Birch (military officer) (1735–1811), British Army major general
