= Charles Gilpin (politician) =

British politician (1815–1874)

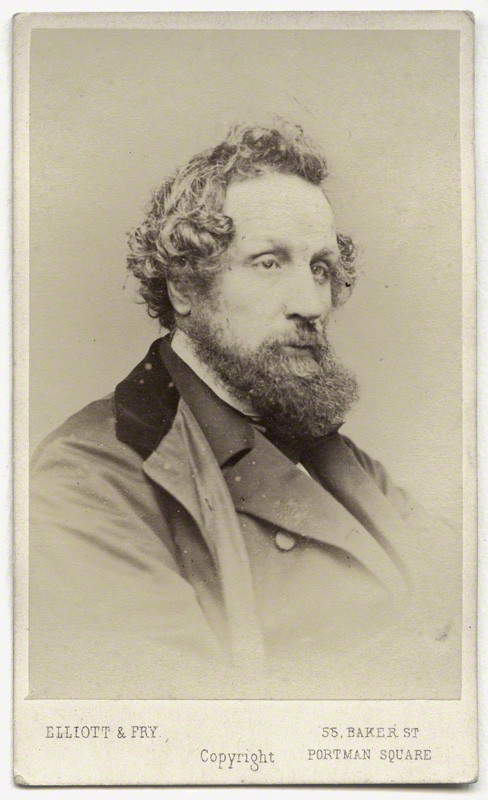
- Gilpin by Elliott & Fry

Member of Parliament for Northampton
- In office 1857–1874 Serving with: Robert Vernon Smyth to 1859; The Lord Henley 1859 – Feb. 1874; Pickering Phipps from Feb. 1874
- Preceded by: Raikes Currie; Robert Vernon Smyth
- Succeeded by: Charles George Merewether; Pickering Phipps

Parliamentary Secretary to the Poor Law Board
- In office 1859–1865
- Preceded by: Frederick Knight
- Succeeded by: George Byng

Personal details
- Born: 31 March 1815 Bristol, England
- Died: 8 September 1874 (aged 59) 10 Bedford Square, London, England
- Resting place: Friends Burial Ground, Winchmore Hill, London, England
- Party: Liberal (1859–1874)
- Other political affiliations: Whig (1857–1859)
- Education: Sidcot School

Charles Gilpin (31 March 1815 – 8 September 1874) was a Quaker, orator, politician, publisher, and railway director. Among his many causes were repeal of the Corn Laws, establishing world peace through the Peace Society, abolition of the death penalty, abolition of slavery, enfranchisement by providing freehold land for purchase, liberation of Hungary from the Austro-Hungarian Empire, Hungarian exiles in England, the Poor Law, prison reform, and foreign relations. He was "a thorough liberal" (Biographical Catalogue).

== Parents and education ==
He was born at Bristol on 31 March 1815, eldest of six surviving sons (there were seven daughters) of James Gilpin (1780–1855) and Mary Gilpin (born Sturge, 1789–1842), a sister of Joseph and Edmund Sturge.

He was educated at Sidcot School from 1824 to 1828. At the age of 13, he organised a mock trial, "with great ability".

His first job was as a traveller for a Manchester warehouse. During this period he came under the influence of the liberal views of his uncle Joseph and Richard Cobden. By way of their opposition to the Corn Laws, Gilpin received a training in public speaking so successful that "before he was five-and-twenty, his services were widely sought in favour of many great public movements of the time" (Times obituary).

== Marriage and children ==
He married Anna Crouch (1811–1892), daughter of William Crouch (1768?–1854) of Falmouth, accountant, and Lucretia Crouch (born Anson, 1777–1858).

The number, gender and lives of their children is unclear:

- A daughter called Anna was born 1 December 1840, married on 21 September 1872 to Richard Pigott and was a beneficiary of Gilpin's Will.
- A biographical entry in Sidcot School: The Register of Old Scholars says Charles Gilpin married Anna Crouch c.1839 at Falmouth and had children named Anne, Louis and Charles.
- Milligan's Biographical Dictionary says there were two sons and two daughters of the marriage.
- An obituary of Charles Gilpin says that an only son died, after a long illness, the sorrow of this loss leading to Gilpin's own death in 1874.

== Publishing and book-selling ==
In 1842, Charles Gilpin moved to London and took over the stock of the bookseller's and publisher's business of Edward Fry (1783–1841) moving it from Houndsditch to No. 5, Bishopsgate Street Without in the City of London. The business was successful but in 1853, he retired to develop his other business, philanthropic and political interests. The publishing business was apparently taken over by William & Frederick G. Cash and later Alfred William Bennett.

=== Range of publications ===
The British Library Integrated Catalogue lists 76 titles printed by Charles Gilpin, including works by Elihu Burritt, Henry Clarke Wright, Jonathan Dymond, Pestalozzi, George William Alexander, Thomas Clarkson, György Klapka, William Wells Brown, George Copway and Giuseppe Mazzini.

He also published a large number of memoirs of the lives of Quakers, including those of Elizabeth Fry and William Allen. He published the Scriptural verse of Lovell Squire, his wife's sister's husband. He published Aunt Jane’s Verses, for Children ... Illustrated in 1851: Aunt Jane was Jane Crewdson.

Gilpin published at least two books on the subject of water cure or hydropathy. One, by E.S. Abdy was translated from German, the other was on the waters of Ben Rhydding in West Yorkshire.

He published at least two books by the prison reformer Alexander Maconochie.

He published the Proceedings of the second (Paris, 1849) and third (Frankfurt-am-Main, 1850) International Peace Congresses.

=== The Friend ===
In 1842, at the request of a weighty Quaker board, he launched and published The Friend, an open-minded evangelical Quaker magazine. The first issue was dated "First-month 1843", under the editorship of Charles Tylor. In 1849, Gilpin purchased the publication from the board and was its editor from 1852 until 1857. The magazine is still in publication.

== Political elections and roles ==
=== The Court of Common Council ===
Gilpin was elected to The Court of Common Council of the City of London in 1848. He was largely instrumental in the abolition of street tolls.

=== Perth by-election, 1852 ===
Since 1841, the Perth constituency had been represented in Parliament by Fox Maule, the heir apparent of his father, Baron Panmure. He was Secretary at War from July 1846 to January 1852, when for two or three weeks he was President of the Board of Control (overseeing the British East India Company). In April 1852, he succeeded his father as 2nd Baron Panmure.

Fox Maule's appointment to the Board of Control necessitated a by-election. Gilpin challenged him, supported by local reformers and a meeting to nominate the candidate was held on Monday 9 February 1852. Maule defended his record in Parliament and in Office, "amidst mingled cheers and hisses".

Mr. Gilpin was also greeted by cheers and hisses and stated that 150 to 200 electors had invited him to stand as "the Rt Hon Gentleman had not fulfilled his profession of reform". Maule had justified the continuation of the Government Grant to the Catholic Maynooth College. Gilpin said he was against all state funding of religion and would vote against the continuation of the grant.

However, when Mr. Maule demanded a poll, despite a show of hands in Gilpin's favour, Gilpin withdrew and Maule was declared returned.

Maule's elevation to the House of Lords on the death of his father on 13 April 1852 caused a further by-election in Perth. However, he had already offered to stand for the Forfar constituency.

The liberal contestants for Perth were Charles Gilpin and Hon. Arthur Kinnaird and their supporters were almost equally divided between the two candidates. Through the Conservative vote, Gilpin lost to Kinnaird (325 against 225 votes). Gilpin did not stand for Parliament at the July 1852 General Election.

=== MP for Northampton ===
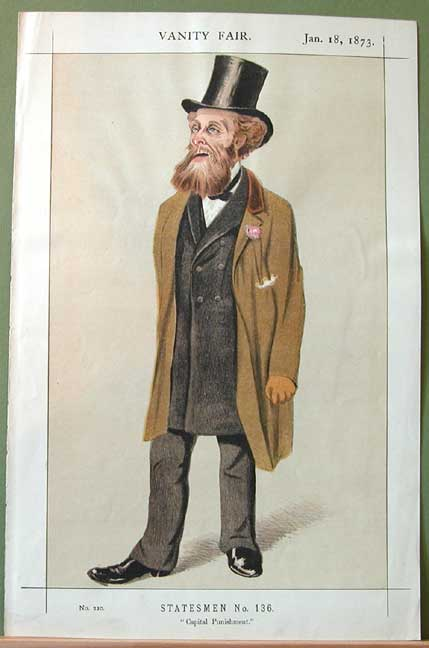
Gilpin as portrayed by Melchiorre Delfico in Vanity Fair, 18 January 1873. It is captioned "Capital Punishment"

At the general elections 1857, 1859, 1865 and February 1874, Gilpin was elected to represent the Northampton constituency

=== Conspiracy to Murder Bill and atrocities in India ===
Gilpin opposed the Conspiracy to Murder Bill of 1858, drafted in response to the attempted assassination of Napoleon III on 4 January 1858. The plot was hatched in England. The bill sought to increase the penalty for conspiring to murder persons abroad from a misdemeanour to a felony. The failure of the bill led to Palmerston's resignation as Prime Minister and the general election of 1859.

He also strongly condemned the massacre during the Indian Rebellion of 1857 of hundreds of disarmed Indian sepoys at Ajnala in Punjab on the orders of Frederick Henry Cooper, the Deputy Commissioner of Amritsar, declaring "one such atrocity as this would do more to excite burning hatred to our power and to our faith, everything multiplied a hundred fold, than the missionaries could eradicate in the next century".

=== Role in Government ===
In view of his opposition to the Conspiracy bill, it is surprising that Palmerston offered Gilpin a job in his 1859 Government and that Gilpin accepted, having negotiated that he would not be bound by the party whip. The job was Secretary of the Poor Law Board. This appointment did not please his fellow Quaker, John Bright MP, who remarked "Thou'd better have a rope put around your neck". Gilpin served until 1865.

== Beyond publishing and Parliament ==
=== Directorships ===
He was a director of the South Eastern, the Metropolitan, and the Smyrna & Cassaba Railways.

He was chairman of the National Freehold Company, Moorgate and the British Land Company from its establishment in 1857 until 1873 and a director of the National Provident Life Assurance Company.

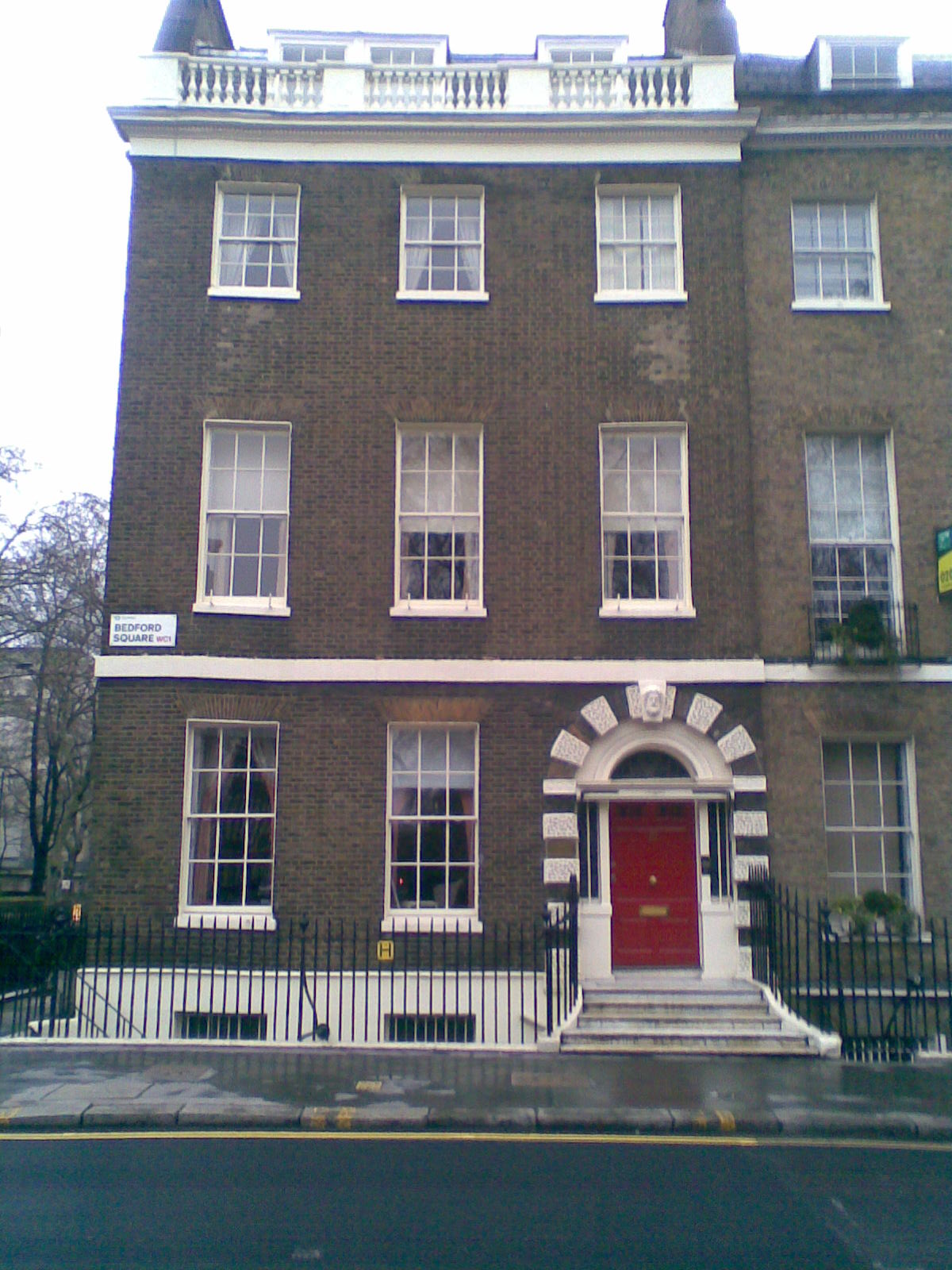
Charles Gilpin's home at 10, Bedford Square, London

=== Kossuth ===
Gilpin was a friend and supporter of Lajos or Louis Kossuth, the Hungarian Nationalist. "His London residence, was the English home of Louis Kossuth and Garibaldi".

=== As a Quaker ===
His obituary in The Friend says: "As a Friend, he took a warm interest in the welfare of the Society. His clear voice was often heard at Yearly Meeting [the annual gathering of British Quakers] . . . our Friend's sphere of action often seemed more political than religious, but we believe the motive power that influenced him was his acceptance of Christianity as a spiritual reality . . . intended for all men". In 1855, he was a member of the Committee of the Friends Temperance Union.

== Death and legacy ==
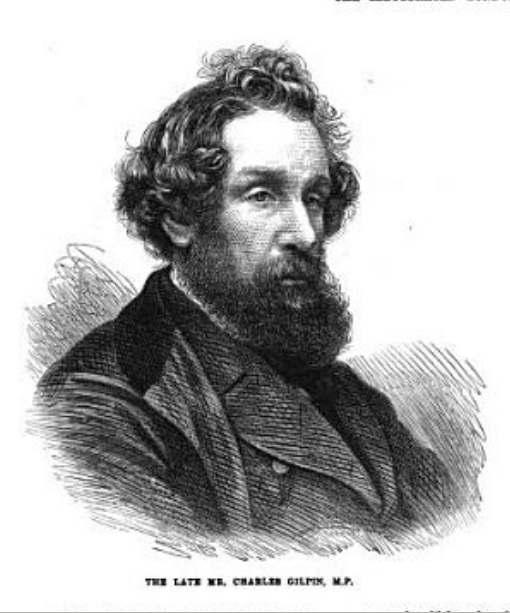
Charles Gilpin

After a period of illness, he died at his home, 10 Bedford Square, London on 8 September 1874. More than 1,000 people attended his funeral at the Friends Burial Ground, Winchmore Hill. His will left everything to his wife (except 50 guineas to several persons), and after her death, to their daughter, Mrs Anna Crouch Pigott.

At the by-election, following his death, Charles George Merewether (Conservative) was elected for the Northampton Constituency, which Gilpin had represented for seventeen years.

The last executions in the United Kingdom, by hanging, took place in 1964. Although not applied since, the death penalty remained on the statute book for certain other offences until 1998.

In 1968, Duke University bought a large quantity of Charles Gilpin's papers, which are now carefully catalogued and available to scholars.

Parliament of the United Kingdom
Preceded by Raikes Currie; Robert Vernon	Member of Parliament for Northampton; 1857 – 1874; With: Robert Vernon to 1859; The Lord Henley 1859 – Feb. 1874; Pickering Phipps from Feb. 1874	Succeeded by Charles Merewether; Pickering Phipps
Political offices
Preceded by Frederick Knight	Parliamentary Secretary to the Poor Law Board; 1859–1865	Succeeded by George Byng
