= Shaheedan da Khu =

Well near Ajnala, India

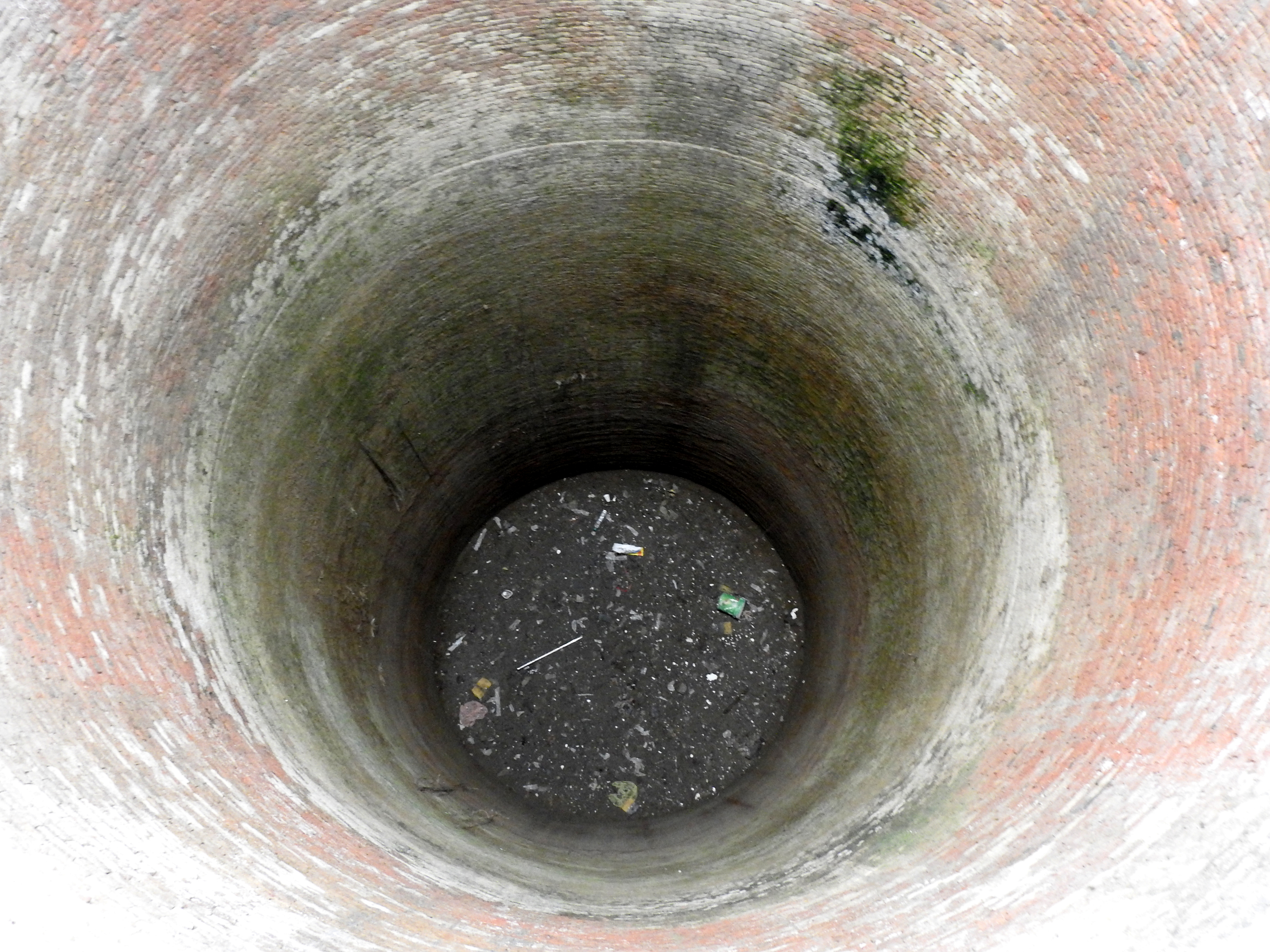
- Kalianwala Khu ( Black well) or Shaheedan da Khu

- Location of Ajnala in India
- Location: 31.84°N 74.76°E; Ajnala, Amritsar, Punjab, British India
- Date: August 31, 1857; 169 years ago (IST)
- Target: Soldiers of Rebel of 1857 of India
- Attack type: Massacre
- Weapons: rifles and stuffed in a small room, where many died of asphyxiation
- Deaths: 282
- Injuries: ~
- Perpetrator: British India Authorities

Shaheedan da Khu or Kalianwala Khu is a well near Ajnala in northwestern India. The bodies of Indian soldiers killed during the Sepoy Mutiny of 1857 were disposed of here. Over 247 of these bodies were recovered in 2014.

== Disposal and recovery of bodies ==
During the 1857 Sepoy Mutiny, many Indian soldiers revolted against the British. Around 500 revolted at Mian Mir Cantonment in Lahore. They swam across the Ravi River to reach the town of Ajnala, now in Amritsar district. Of them, 218 were killed by British soldiers at Dadian Sofian village near Ajnala. The remaining 282 were stuffed in a small room, where many died of asphyxiation. The rest were shot dead and their bodies were thrown into a well, which was later named "Kalianwala Khu" and "Shaheedan da Khu".

In February 2014, the remains of 22 of the soldiers were dug out from the well. The incident came to light after it was reported in major newspapers. On further digging on 1 March 2014, 40 more bodies were recovered.

=== Gallery ===
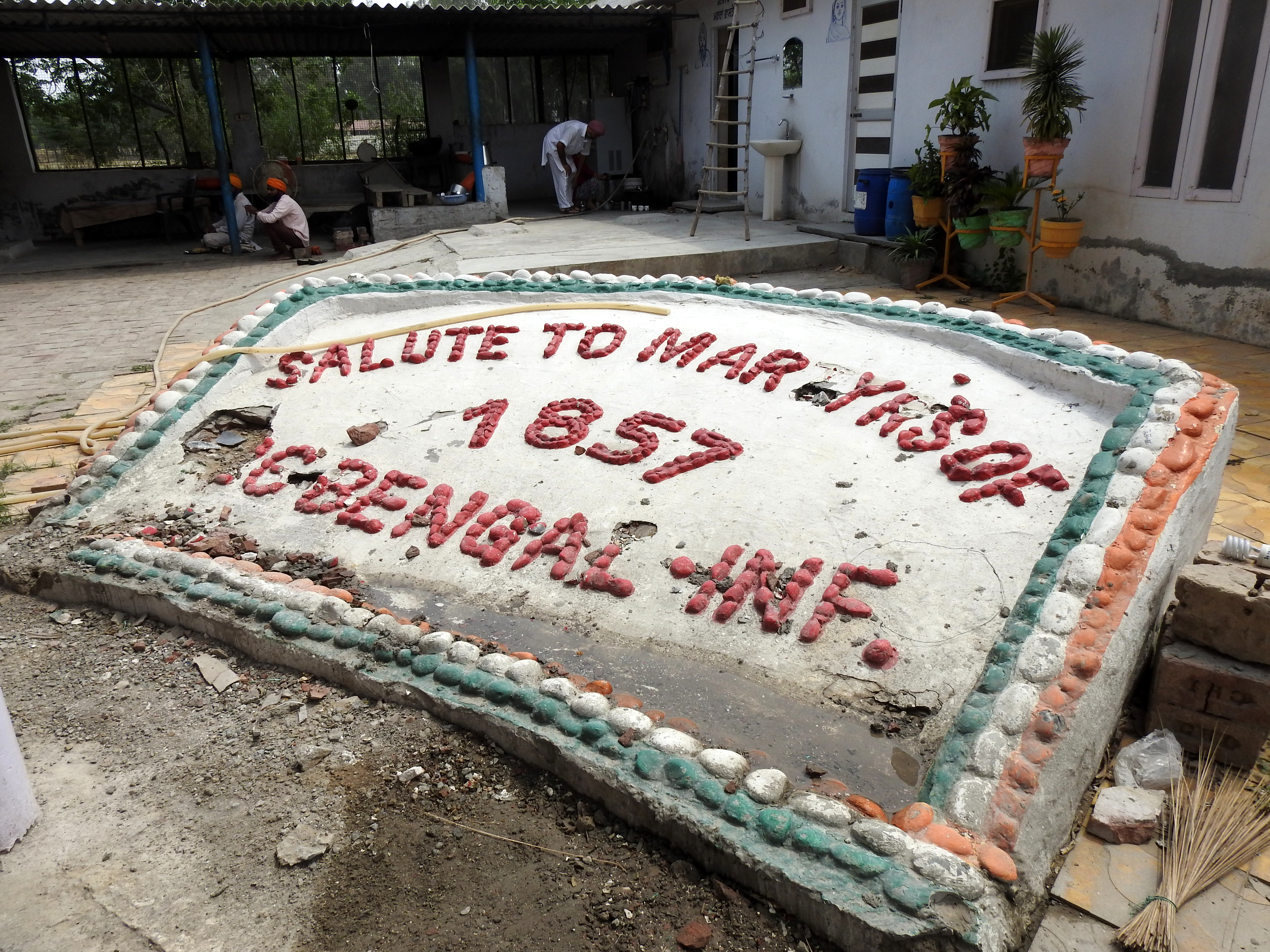
Inscription at Shaheedan da Khu (left); under-construction memorial at the well (right)

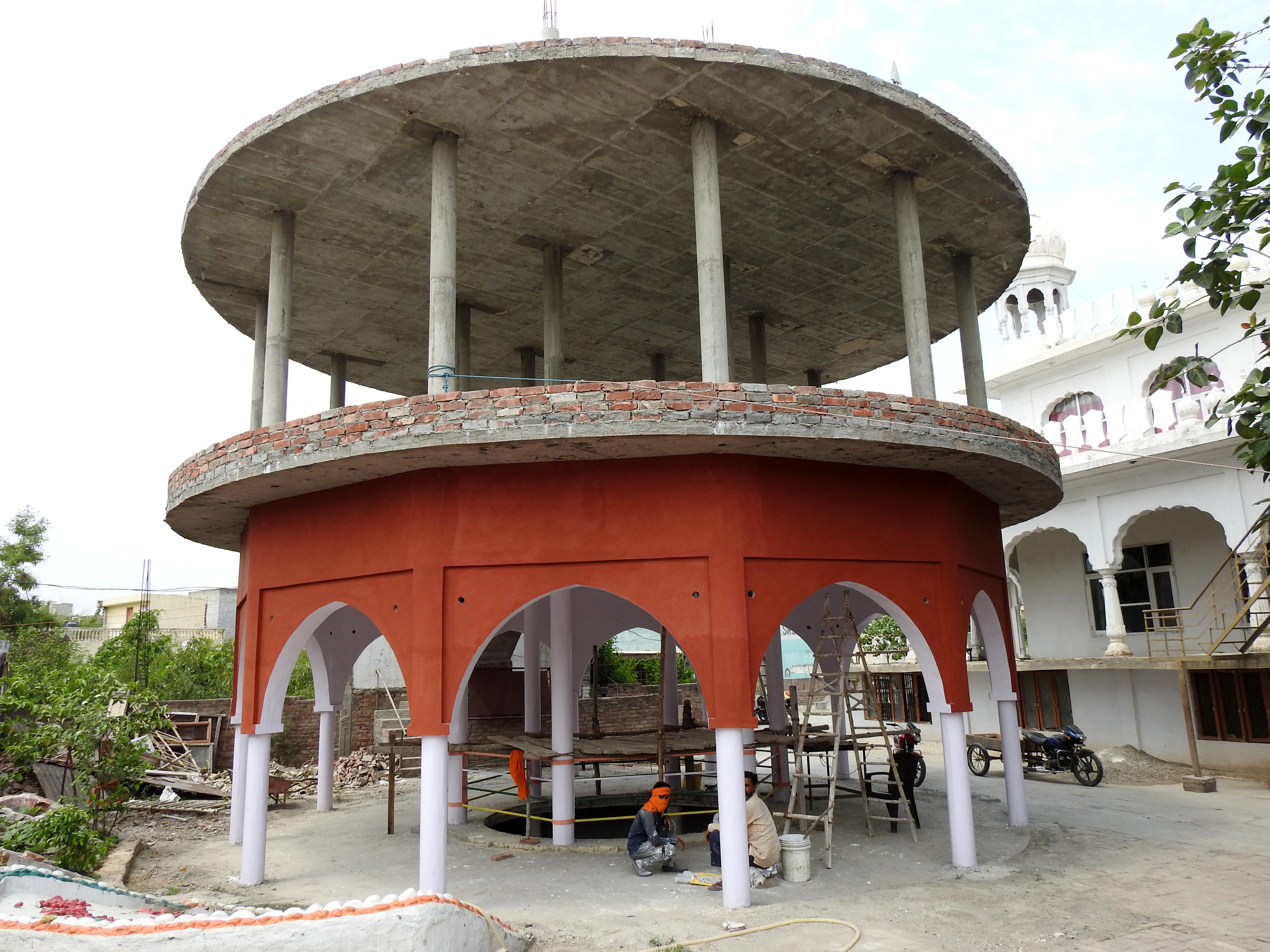
