= 1874 Northampton by-election =

UK Parliamentary by-election

- 6 October 1874

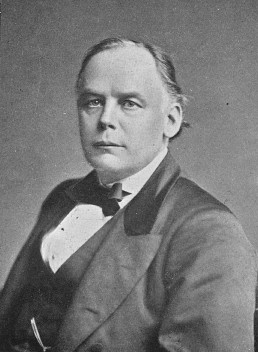
	First party	Second party	Third party
Candidate	Charles George Merewether	William Fowler	Charles Bradlaugh
Party	Conservative	Liberal	Independent Liberal
Popular vote	2,717	1,836	1,766
MP before election
Charles Gilpin
Liberal
Subsequent MP
Charles George Merewether
Conservative

The 1874 Northampton by-election was fought on 6 October 1874. The by-election was fought due to the death of the incumbent Liberal MP, Charles Gilpin. It was won by the Conservative candidate Charles George Merewether.

== Riot ==
The declaration of the result on the night of 6 October 1874 was followed by serious rioting in Northampton by supporters of the defeated radical candidate Charles Bradlaugh, who believed the result to be unfair. Several thousand people were present in front of the town hall when the result was announced. Contemporary press reports state that the declaration was met with hooting, and that Bradlaugh's appeal to his followers to disperse peaceably was refused.

A large crowd then gathered on the town's Market Square and attacked the Lord Palmerston public house, which had served as the campaign headquarters of the Liberal candidate William Fowler, with stones; the police were unable to disperse the rioters. The offices of the town's newspapers, blamed by rioters for Bradlaugh's defeat, were also attacked, and cobblestones were torn up from the square and used to break windows. The mayor read the Riot Act and troops were summoned, though procedural requirements delayed their deployment. Soldiers eventually fired shots over the heads of the crowd to disperse it.

A cobblestone thrown during the riot is held in the collection of Northampton Museum and Art Gallery.
