= Frederick Henry Cooper =

Frederick Henry Cooper CB (1827–1869) was a British civil servant who worked with the East India Company. He served as Deputy Commissioner of Amritsar, Punjab, during the Indian rebellion of 1857.

Along with James Neill, John Nicholson and William Hodson, he is noted for his ruthlessness and indiscriminate killings of Indian rebels and civilians during the 1857 uprising. His killing of about 500 sepoys of the 26th Native Infantry and civilians at Ajnala were gleefully described in his memoirs. After throwing 257 sepoy bodies into a well, he remarks: "The few remnants have since been brought in and executed.There is a well at Kanpur, but there is also one at Ajnala." This well is known as Shaheedan Wala Khu (martyrs' well) at Ajnala in district Amritsar.

His acts were condemned by the Liberal MP and Quaker Charles Gilpin in the British parliament on 14 March 1859:

"as an Englishman, he felt himself called upon to blush for the shame which had been brought upon the character of his country."

—

Nevertheless, Cooper was appointed a Companion of the Order of the Bath in the 1860 Birthday Honours while serving in the Bengal Civil Service.
