= Gaggomahal =

Gaggomahal or Gaggo Mahal is a village about 9 Km North East direction from Tehsil Ajnala and about 40 Km North West from city Amritsar in Amritsar, Punjab, India.

Pin code is 143102

Coordinates: 31°54′35″N, 74°48′44″E

Administered by a Sarpanch elected under the Panchayati Raj system

As per census 2011, total population of Gaggomahal is 3941, out of which 2075 are males and 1866 are females.

The village sex ratio of 899 is slightly higher than Punjab state average of 895.

The literacy rate of 69.88% , male literacy rate with 69.88% and female literacy rate 65.78 % is below the Punjab average of 75.84% — indicating room for educational development.( Census 2011)

Child Sex ratio 752 per 1,000 boys. ( Census 2011)

Bhai Jeevan Singh ji ( Jaita Ji) first General of Guru Gobind Singh ji was born on 30th November 1649 in Gaggomahal. A Gurudwara stands at village as monument.

When Baba Ajit Singh, the eldest son of Guru Gobind Singh, was surrounded by Mughal forces at the banks of Sirsa River, Baba Jeevan Singh armed with two swords in both hands, rode his horse with the reins in his mouth, killed many Mughals and rescued Sahibzada Ajit Singh.

At the Battle of Chamkaur, Bhai Jeevan Singh shot arrow after arrow, and Gun wreaking havoc on the Mughals. Where he attained martyrdom in battle. His Shaheedi Diwas is 8th December 1705.

A Gurdwara called Shahid Burj now stands at the Battle of Chamkaur site as a monument to his memory.

He belonged to a family of the Ranghar (Ranghreta) caste. His ancestor Bhai Kalyana Ji, along with Baba Buddha Ji, had originally settled at Gaggo Mahal before later moving to Ramdas in Amritsar district. Bhai Kalyana Ji served the Guru's establishment from the first to the sixth Sikh Gurus — a family with an extraordinary multigenerational connection to the Guru Ghar.
