= Alonzo Money =

Sir Alonzo Money, KCMG, CB (21 January 1821 – 8 April 1900) was a British administrator in India and Egypt.

The son of George Money, Accountant-General and Master of the Supreme Court, Calcutta, Alonzo Money was educated at East India Company College, Haileybury, from where he was appointed to the Bengal Civil Service in 1843. He held various posts in Bengal, rising to become a member of the Revenue Board, and retired in 1878. During the Indian mutiny of 1857, Money, with the aid of a few Europeans and about 100 Sikh soldiers, brought in seven lakhs of treasure from Gya to Calcutta.

In 1877, Money proceeded to Egypt to take up an appointment as the British director of the Daira Sanieh. He held the position until 1880, when he was appointed British commissioner of the Egyptian Caisse de la Dette Publique, in succession to Auckland Colvin.

He was appointed a CB in 1860 and KCMG in 1898. he also received the second class of the Order of Osmanieh and the Grand Cordon of the Order of the Medjidie.

He married Eliza Maria Boddam, who died in 1883.
