= Arthur Herbert Cocks =

Arthur Herbert Cocks, CB (18 April 1819 – 29 August 1881) was a British administrator in India and a member of the Bengal Civil Service.

Born on 18 April 1819, Cocks was the third son of Colonel the Hon. Philip James Cocks, MP, who was second son of Sir Charles Somers-Cocks, created first Lord Somers of the second creation, and half brother of the first Earl Somers by Frances, daughter of Arthur Herbert of Brusterfield, County Kerry. He received a nomination to the Indian civil service, and after finishing his education at Haileybury College he went to Bengal in 1837.

He soon became very popular and gave marked signs of ability, and was one of the young Bengal civilians sent to Sir Charles Napier when, after the conquest of Scinde, he asked for administrators. He gave great satisfaction to Napier, and on the outbreak of the second Sikh war in 1848 he was attached to Lord Gough's headquarters as political officer. In this capacity he showed great courage and coolness in the battle of Chillianwallah, the affair of Ramnuggur, and the battle of Goojerat, and during the latter battle he rode away from the staff and engaged in a hand-to-hand fight with a Sikh sowar, who was threatening to attack the commander-in-chief and his escort, and was wounded. Lord Gough was so pleased with this gallant action that he presented Cocks with the sword he was wearing, and for his services throughout the campaign he received the Punjab war medal. Immediately after the peace Cocks was attached to the famous Punjab commission. He was one of the most distinguished of this band of famous men, and a friend of Sir Robert Montgomery, Sir Herbert Edwardes, John Nicholson, and others, though his early retirement caused him to be less known.

On 15 April 1847 he married Anna Marian Jessie, daughter of Lieutenant-General John Eckford, C.B. In 1860 he was made a C.B., and in 1863 he resigned the Bengal civil service and returned to England. During the mutiny his district had fortunately been undisturbed, so he did not gain so much credit as some of his colleagues; but his talent for administration, with the extraordinary affection he won from the natives, would have secured his promotion to high office if he had cared for it.

On his retirement he settled down into a country squire; he became a J.P. for Worcestershire, and served as a captain in the Worcestershire Militia from 1865 to 1872. He died at his house in Ashburn Place, London, on 29 Aug. 1881. He left three sons, of whom the eldest is (1887) heir-presumptive to the barony of Somers.
