= Charles Merewether =

British politician (1823–1884)

Charles George Merewether MP

Member of Parliament for Northampton
- In office 7 October 1874 – 5 April 1880 Serving with Pickering Phipps
- Preceded by: Pickering Phipps; Charles Gilpin
- Succeeded by: Henry Labouchère; Charles Bradlaugh

Personal details
- Born: 1823
- Died: 26 June 1884 (aged 60)
- Party: Conservative

Charles George Merewether (1823 – 26 June 1884) was a Conservative Party politician.

Hamond first stood for election in Northampton in 1868, but was unsuccessful. He was again unsuccessful at the 1874 election, but gained the seat at a by-election shortly after. However, he was beaten again in 1880.

Parliament of the United Kingdom
Preceded by Pickering Phipps; Charles Gilpin	Member of Parliament for Northampton; 1874–1880; With: Pickering Phipps	Succeeded by Henry Labouchère; Charles Bradlaugh
