= Northampton Market Square =

Historic market square in Northampton, England

Market Square
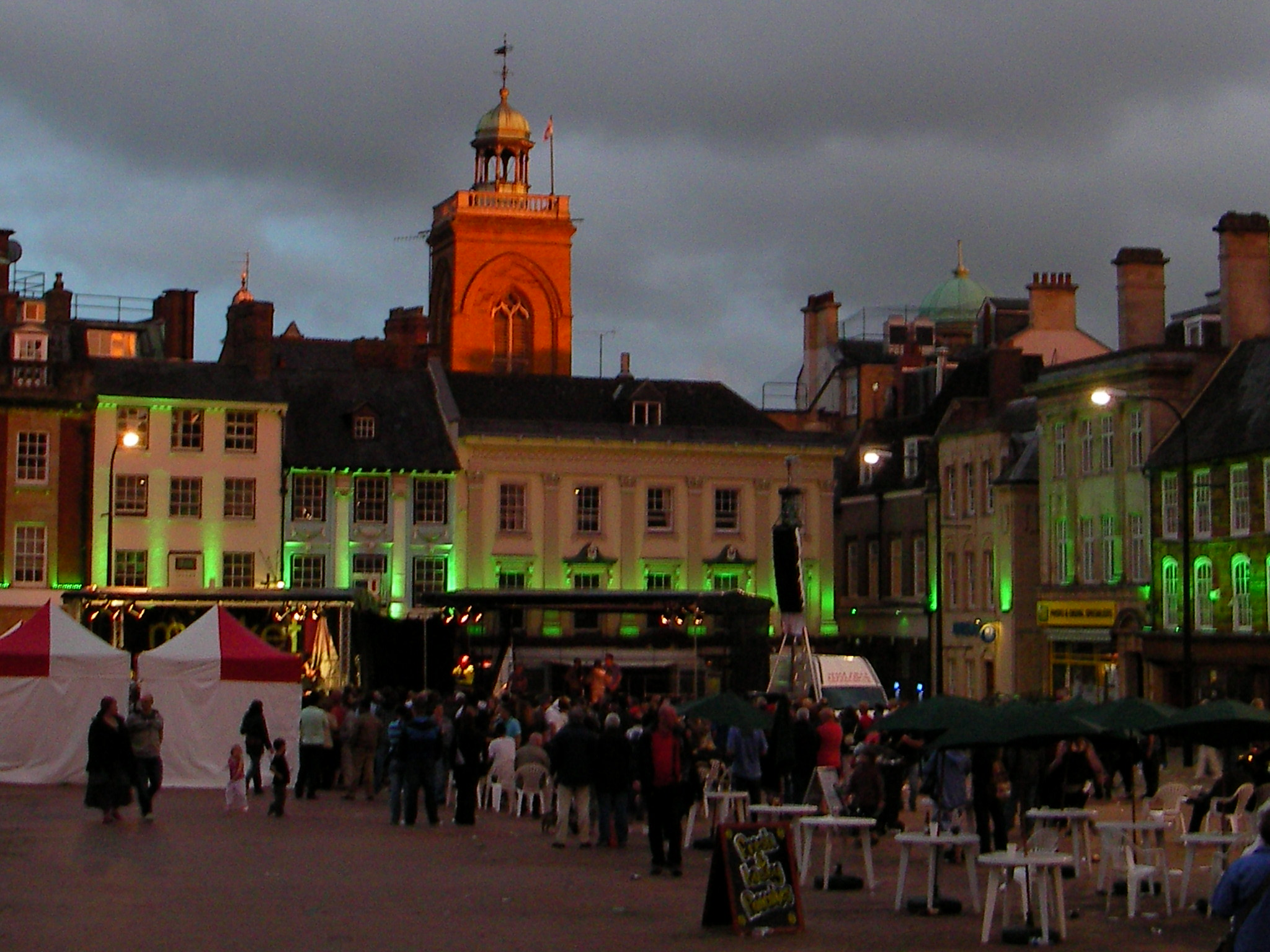
- Interactive map of Market Square
- Area: 0.81 ha (2.0 acres)
- Location: Northampton, England, United Kingdom
- Coordinates: 52.23818°N 0.89633°W

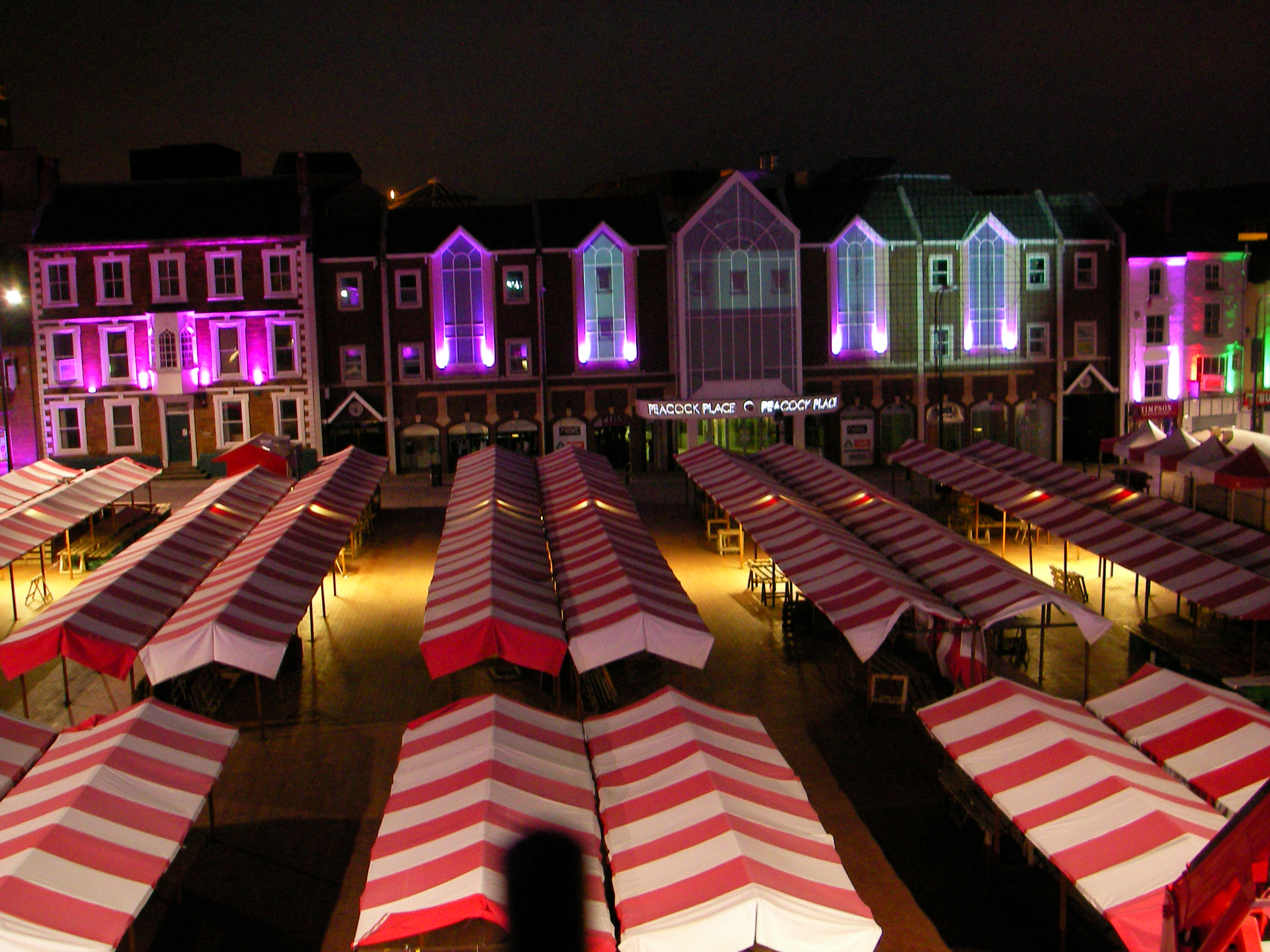
Northampton Market Square

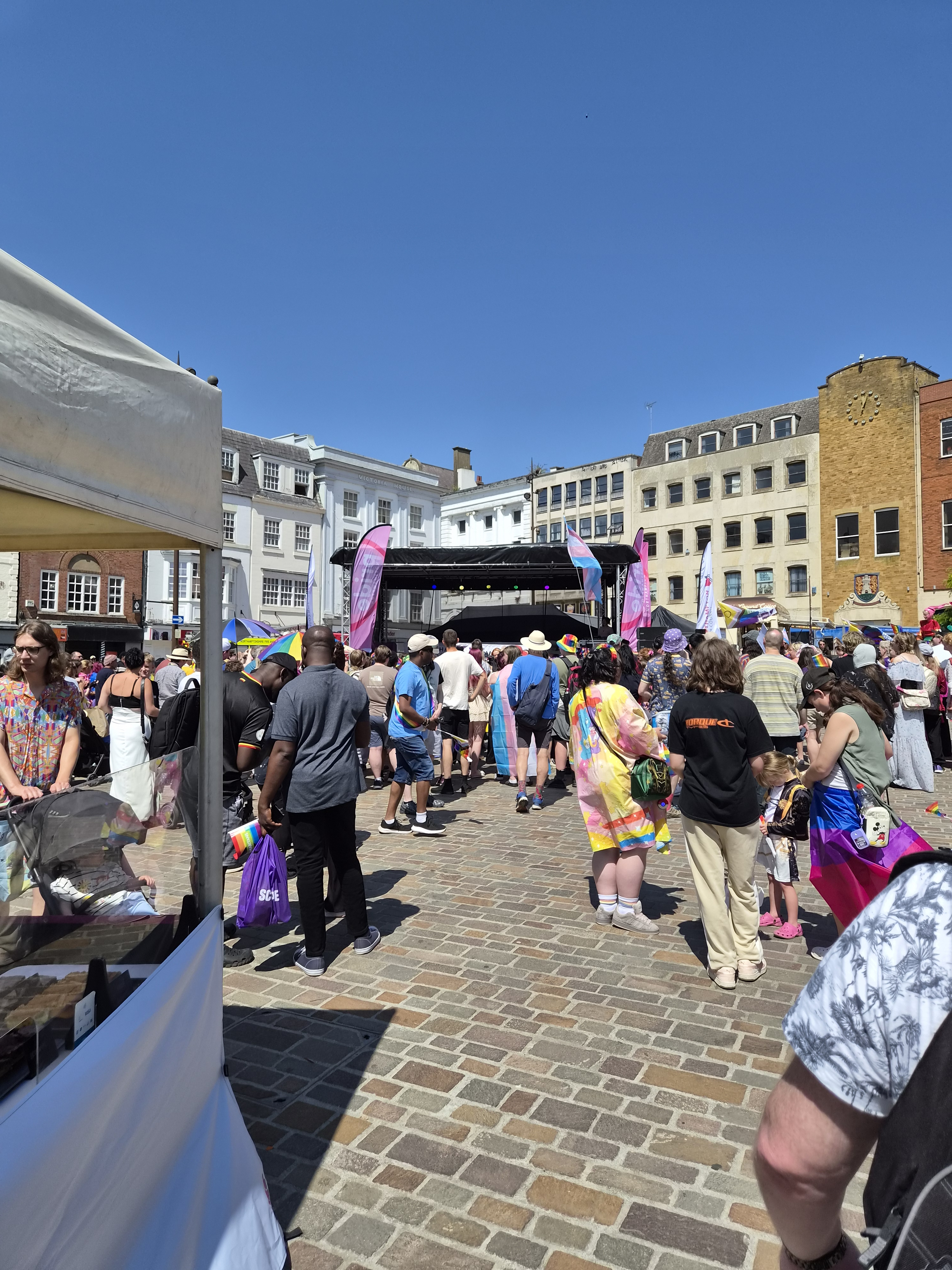
Northampton Pride 2026 in Market Square

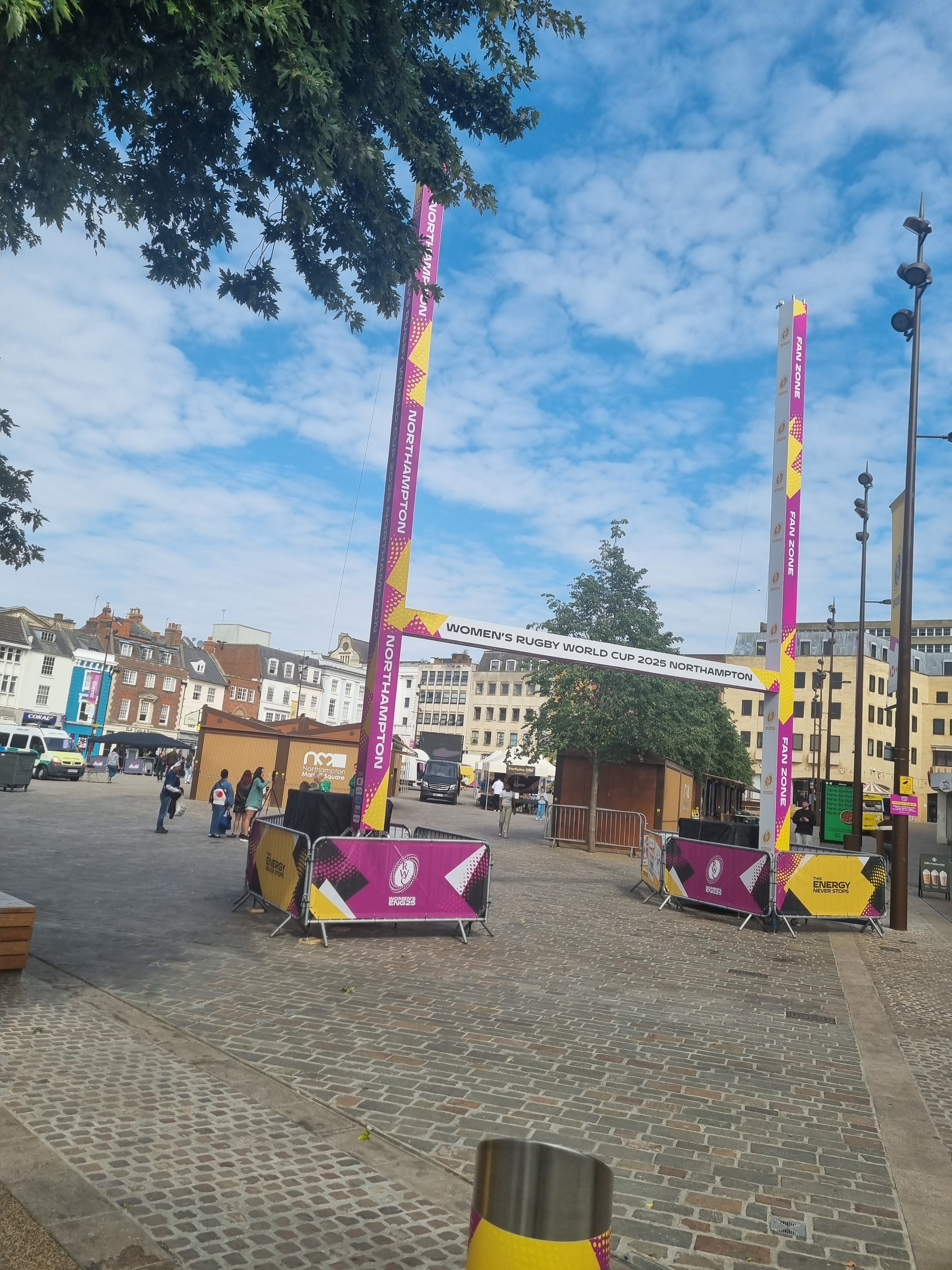
2025 Women's Rugby World Cup fan zone in Market Square

Market Square is a historic market square in the centre of Northampton, England. In use as a marketplace since 1235, it is one of the oldest and largest market squares in Britain. The square underwent a £12.4 million refurbishment between 2023 and 2024, during which archaeologists recorded extensive medieval remains beneath its surface. Since reopening, the square has served as the town's principal outdoor events venue, hosting the annual Northampton Pride festival, the town's Diwali Festival of Lights, and Christmas celebrations, alongside a regular retail market.

== History ==
=== Medieval origins ===
Northampton received its first market charter in 1189, permitting markets and fairs to be held on ground beside All Saints' Church. In 1235, Robert Grosseteste, Bishop of Lincoln, persuaded King Henry III to prohibit trading in the churchyard, and the king ordered the market moved to an area of waste ground immediately north of the church. The market has occupied the site ever since.

A royal charter of Richard II in 1385 appointed the mayor of Northampton clerk of the market, with responsibility for weights and measures. In the 16th and 17th centuries trading on the square was governed by detailed local regulations; one surviving order forbade butchers' and fishmongers' wives from quarrelling or slandering one another, under threat of the stocks or a fine. A pillory, which doubled as a whipping post, stood in the south-east corner of the square and remained in use until 1814.

=== Early modern and modern period ===
The Great Fire of Northampton in 1675 destroyed more than 600 buildings in around six hours, and the town centre was subsequently rebuilt around the Market Square, aided by approximately £25,000 raised locally. The square was central to Northampton's horse trade, which the writer Daniel Defoe described in the 17th century as the centre of England's horse markets and fairs.

In 1874 the square was the scene of the Bradlaugh Riots, when supporters of Charles Bradlaugh, believing an election had been rigged, were dispersed by soldiers firing over the heads of the crowd. King George V was received on the square during a visit to the town in 1913. During the Second World War the square was used for fundraising "War Weapon Weeks", and in October 1945 a Spitfire was assembled on the square for post-war Thanksgiving Week celebrations.

The Emporium Arcade, which opened on the north side of the square in 1901 with around 150 shops, was demolished in the early 1970s as part of post-war redevelopment that removed a number of the square's older buildings.

== 2023–2024 refurbishment ==
Refurbishment of the square began in February 2023, delivered by the contractor Stepnell on behalf of West Northamptonshire Council and funded through the UK Government's Towns Fund. Market traders were relocated to a temporary market at Commercial Street car park for the duration of the works.

The project's cost rose from an initial £8.4 million to £10 million during the early months of construction, and ultimately to £12.4 million, according to the council's Northampton Markets Development Plan published in 2024. The works included new paving, water features, seating, landscaping, a lighting scheme, a dedicated events space, and 18 fixed lockable market cabins with electricity, water and lighting, supplemented by pop-up stalls and pitches for food concession vehicles.

Traders returned to the square on 20 September 2024, and an official reopening celebration was held over the weekend of 19–20 October 2024, featuring live music and family entertainment. A final section of paving was completed in November 2024, bringing the project duration to approximately 21 months.

=== Archaeological findings ===
Archaeologists from MOLA (Museum of London Archaeology), which maintains an office in Northampton, kept a watching brief during excavation work for the new paving and drainage. Multiple medieval market surfaces were recorded beneath the square, containing fragments of medieval shoes, textiles, animal bone, wood, and pottery dated to between about 1200 and 1350.

The remains of several structures were also identified. These included a stone building in the centre of the square, stratigraphically later than most of the medieval layers, which MOLA suggested may have been a previously unknown market hall; a stone building in the south-west of the site dated to approximately 1100–1150, potentially predating the market's establishment on the site; and, on the west side, buildings possibly corresponding to structures depicted on John Speed's early 17th-century map of Northampton, which stood before the Great Fire of 1675.

At the south end of the square archaeologists identified the Great Conduit of Northampton, a water supply structure thought to have been built during the reign of Edward IV and documented as repaired in 1509, which gave its name to the nearby Conduit Lane. A large medieval wooden post was also uncovered; its purpose is uncertain, but it has been suggested it may have been the town's documented whipping post.

In October 2023, works along the western edge of the square exposed an underground cellar belonging to the row of buildings between the square and the Drapery, constructed after the Great Fire of 1675. The cellar was found to have been filled almost to its ceiling with concrete, possibly during redevelopment work in the 1970s.

The larger structures were recorded and reburied before resurfacing, and smaller finds were deposited in the Northamptonshire archaeological collection. QR codes set into ceramic tiles among the new paving link to information about the discoveries and a finds map.

== Events ==
=== Northampton Pride ===
The square is the home of Northampton Pride, an annual festival celebrating the town's LGBTQ community, organised by the Northampton Pride Committee and West Northamptonshire Council's LGBTQ+ and Allies Forum.

The festival typically includes a parade beginning and ending at the square, a main stage programme of performers, and stalls from LGBTQ+ organisations, sports clubs and local businesses. The 2024 parade attracted more than 200 participants, with thousands attending the festival overall.

=== Other events ===
The square hosts the Northampton Diwali Festival of Lights, organised by the Indian Hindu Welfare Organisation, which celebrated its 25th anniversary on the square in October 2025 with cultural stalls, stage entertainment and an evening lantern parade through the town centre.

Other regular events include the town's Christmas lights switch-on, a seasonal ice rink, St George's Day celebrations, Armed Forces Day activities, and free open-air cinema screenings organised by the town centre Business Improvement District.

== Market ==
A retail market continues to operate on the square, with fixed cabin stalls, pop-up tent stalls and food concession pitches managed by West Northamptonshire Council.

== See also ==
- Northampton
- Great Fire of Northampton
- All Saints' Church, Northampton
