= Richard James Holwell Birch =

General Sir Richard James Holwell Birch KCB
- Born: 26 January 1803; Calcutta, British India
- Died: 25 February 1875 (aged 72); Venice, Italy
- Military career
- Allegiance: East India Company; British India
- Branch: Bengal Army
- Service years: 1821–1862
- Rank: General
- Conflicts: First Anglo-Sikh War; Second Sikh War; Indian Rebellion
- Awards: Mentioned in Despatches; Companion of the Order of the Bath; Knight Commander of the Order of the Bath

General Sir Richard James Holwell Birch KCB (26 January 1803 – 25 February 1875) was a British officer of the Bengal Army of the East India Company, who served during the Sikh Wars and the Indian Rebellion of 1857.

== Life ==
He came from a well-known Anglo-Indian family, and was the son of Richard Comyns Birch, of the Bengal Civil Service, and afterwards of Writtle, Essex, who was a grandson of John Zephaniah Holwell, author of the famous account of his sufferings in the Black Hole of Calcutta. Birch was born in 1803 and received a commission as an ensign in the infantry of the Bengal Army in 1821. His numerous circle of relations in India ensured his rapid promotion and almost continuous service on the staff, and after acting as deputy-judge advocate-general at Meerut, and as assistant secretary in the military department at Calcutta, he was appointed judge-advocate-general to the forces in Bengal in 1841. In the same capacity he accompanied the army in the First Sikh War of 1845 to 1846, was mentioned in despatches, and was promoted to lieutenant-colonel for his services.

In the Second Sikh War, in 1849, Birch was appointed to the temporary command of a brigade after the Battle of Chillianwallah. He distinguished himself at the Battle of Gujrat, and was made a Companion of the Order of the Bath in 1849, and continued to serve as brigadier-general in Sir Colin Campbell's campaign in the Kohat Pass in 1850. He then reverted to his appointment at headquarters, and in 1852 received the still more important post of secretary to the Company government in the military department. While in this office, he was promoted to colonel in 1854, major-general in 1858, and still held the secretaryship when the Indian Mutiny broke out in 1857.

At the time of the mutiny and ensuing rebellions, his services were most valuable to the British forces, even though he never left Calcutta. His thorough knowledge of the routine duties of his office and his long official experience enabled him to give valuable advice to Lord Canning, the governor-general, and to Sir Colin Campbell when he arrived to take up the post of commander in chief. These services were recognised by his being made a Knight Commander of the Bath in 1860. In 1861 he left India, and in the following year he was promoted lieutenant-general and retired on full pay. He was later promoted to the rank of full general on the retired list. On 25 February 1875 he died at Venice, aged 72.
