= Ajnala, India =

Town and nagar panchayat in Amritsar, Punjab, India

Ajnala
- Town
- Location in Punjab, India
- Coordinates: 31.84°N 74.76°E
- Country: India
- State: Punjab
- District: Amritsar
- Elevation: 213 m (699 ft)

Population (2001)
  - Total: 18,602

Languages
  - Official: Punjabi
  - Dialect: Majhi dialect
- Time zone: UTC+5:30 (IST)
- Vehicle registration: PB-14

Ajnala is a town, near Amritsar city and a nagar panchayat in Amritsar district in the state of Punjab, India. Kalian Wala Khu, a martyrs place, is a tourist destination.

Ajnala is located at 31.84°N 74.76°E in western Punjab near the border with Pakistan. It has an average elevation of 213 metres (698 feet). Ajnala is the hometown of famous Indo-Canadian Punjabi singer A.P. Dhillon. During his 2021 India tour, Dhillon visited his Ajnala .

== History ==
=== Indian Rebellion of 1857 ===
During the Indian Rebellion of 1857, 282 sepoys of the 26th Native Infantry mutinied at Lahore and subsequently surrendered, believing they were going to be given a fair trial. They were summarily executed without trial by Frederick Henry Cooper, then–deputy commissioner of the district. Their bodies were dumped into a deep dry well near the police station which was later filled with charcoal, lime, and dirt. In March 2014 the head of a local Sikh gurdwara announced that the remains of those buried had been uncovered in the excavation of a well within the shrine. The well is known as Shaheedan da Khu ("the martyrs' well") in the Punjabi language.

==== Shaheedan da Khu ====
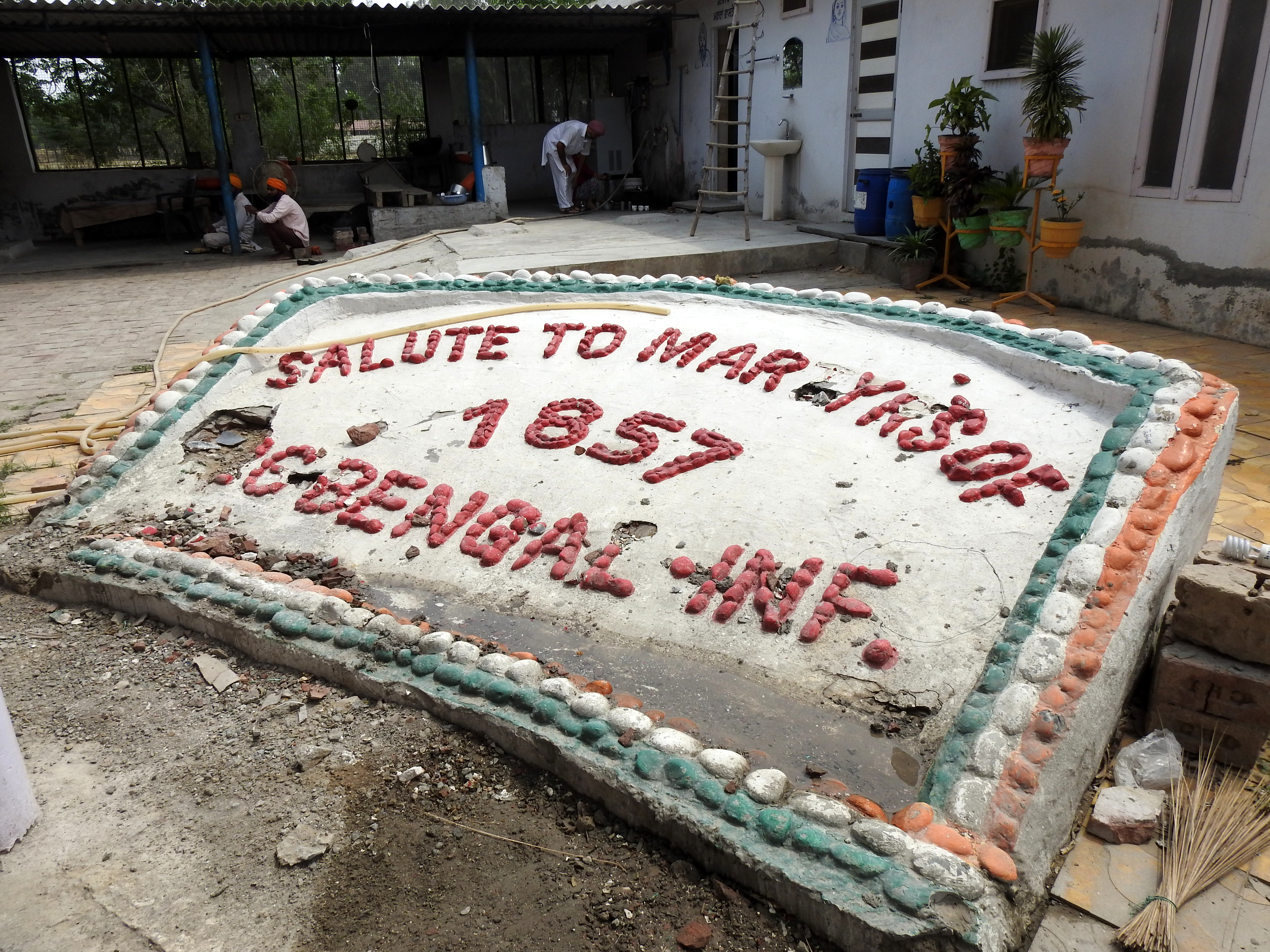
Inscription of Kalianwala Khu (Black well) or Shaheedan da Khu

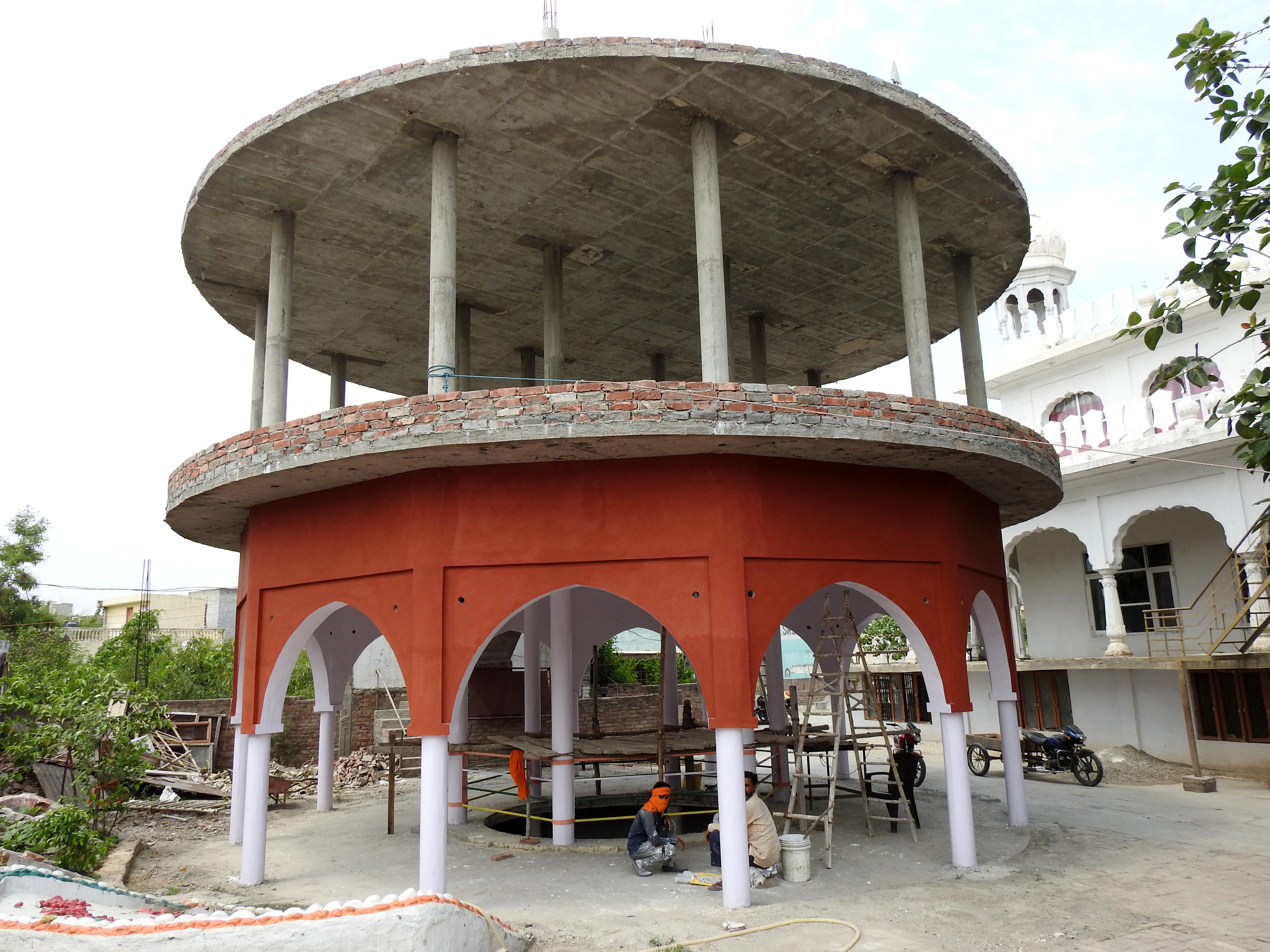
Memorial of Kalianwala Khu (Black well) or Shaheedan da Khu under construction

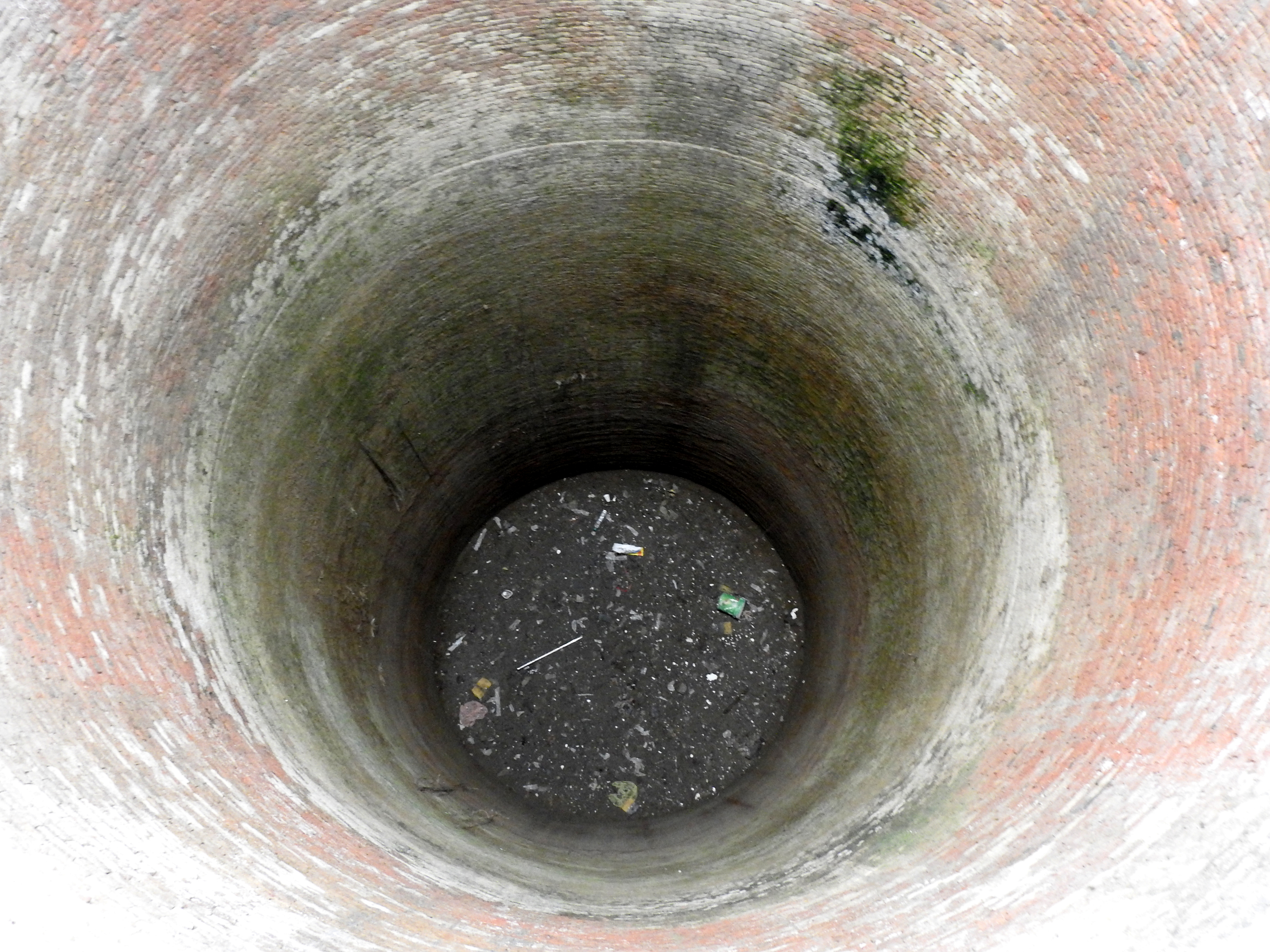
Kalianwala Khu (Black well) or Shaheedan da Khu, Ajnala

==== Old Tehsil, Ajnala ====
Old Tehsil, Ajnala is part of List of State Protected Monuments in Punjab, India and at S-PB-4.

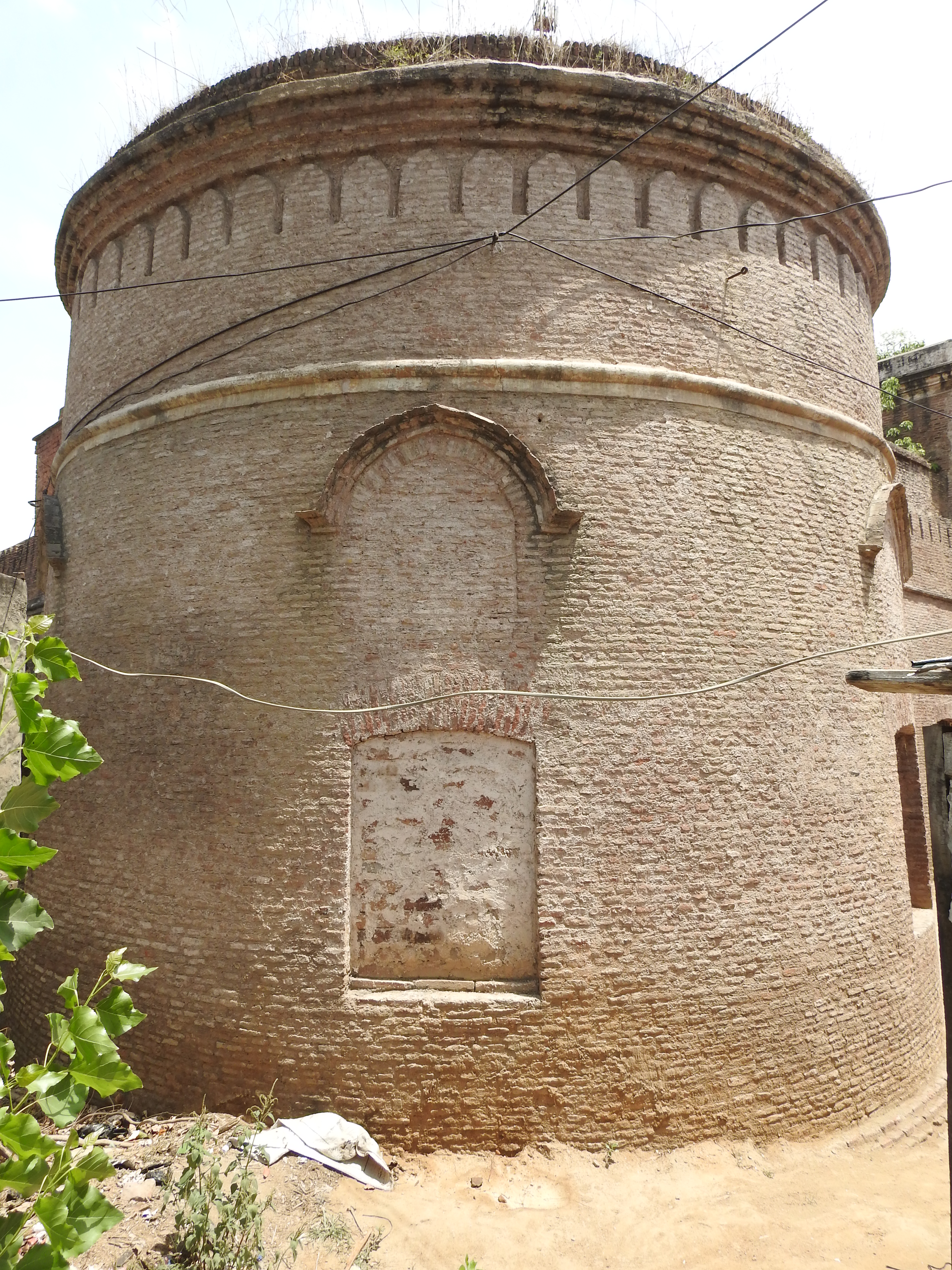
Pillar from the entrance

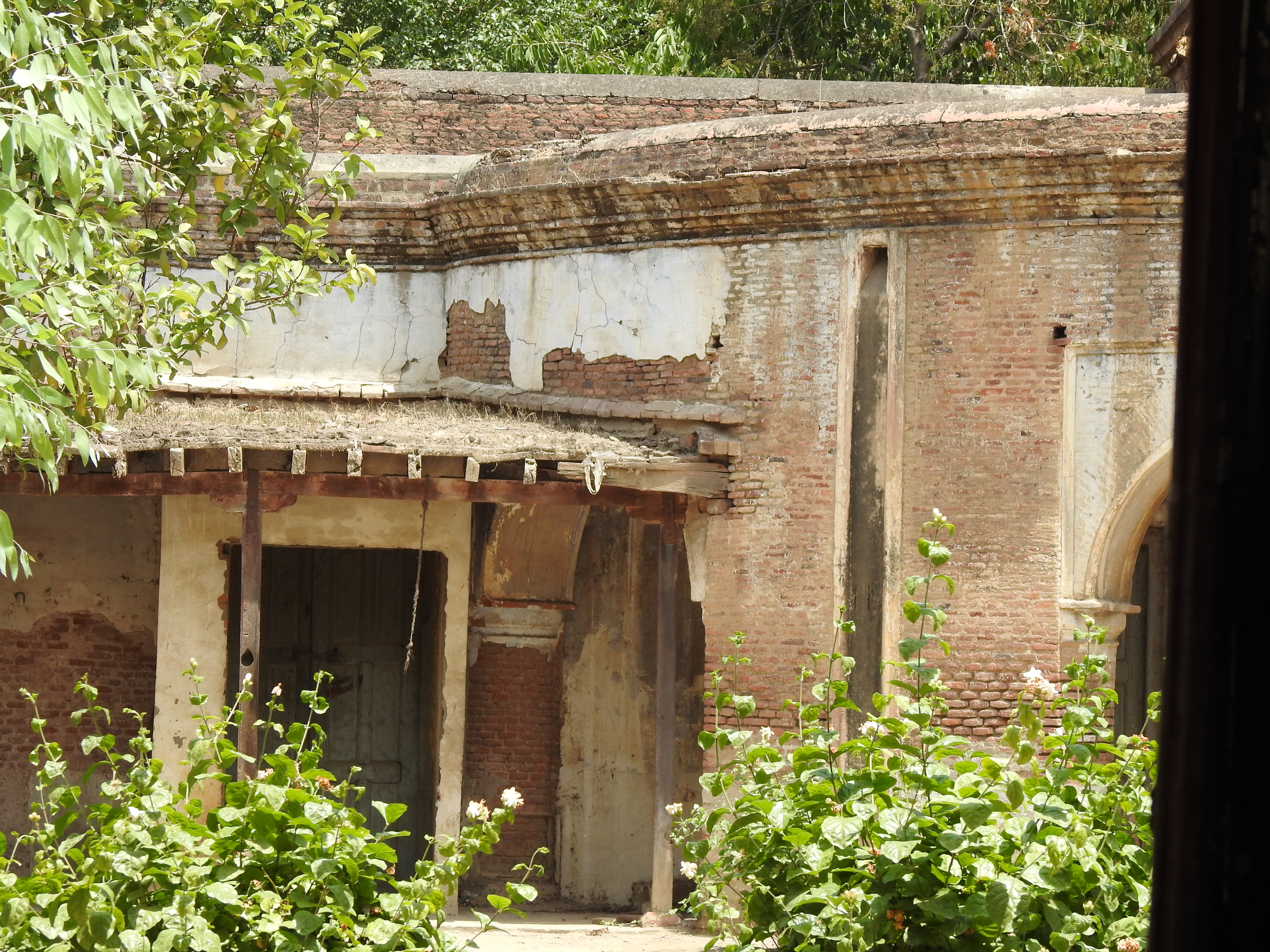
Inner view

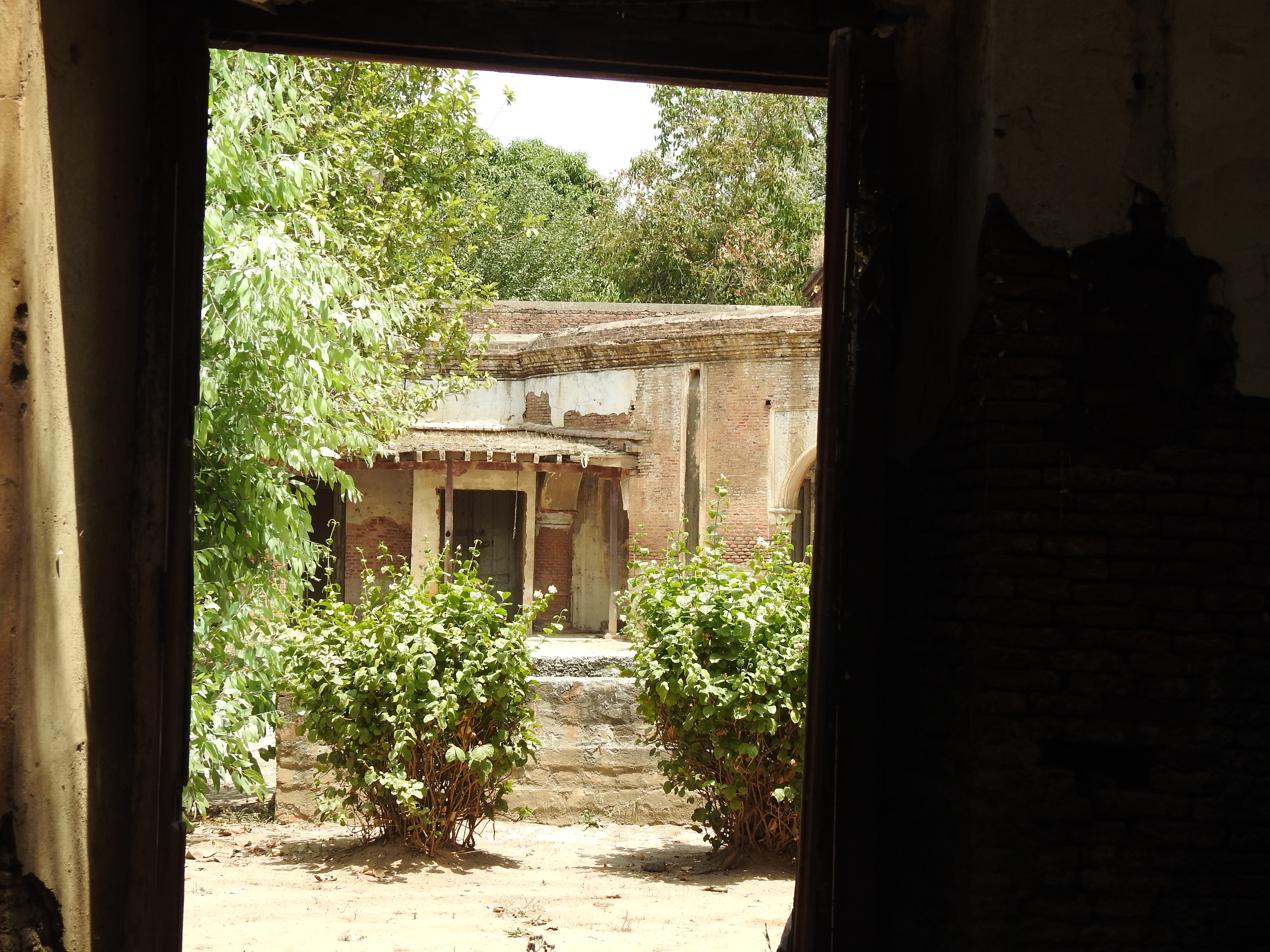
Inner view

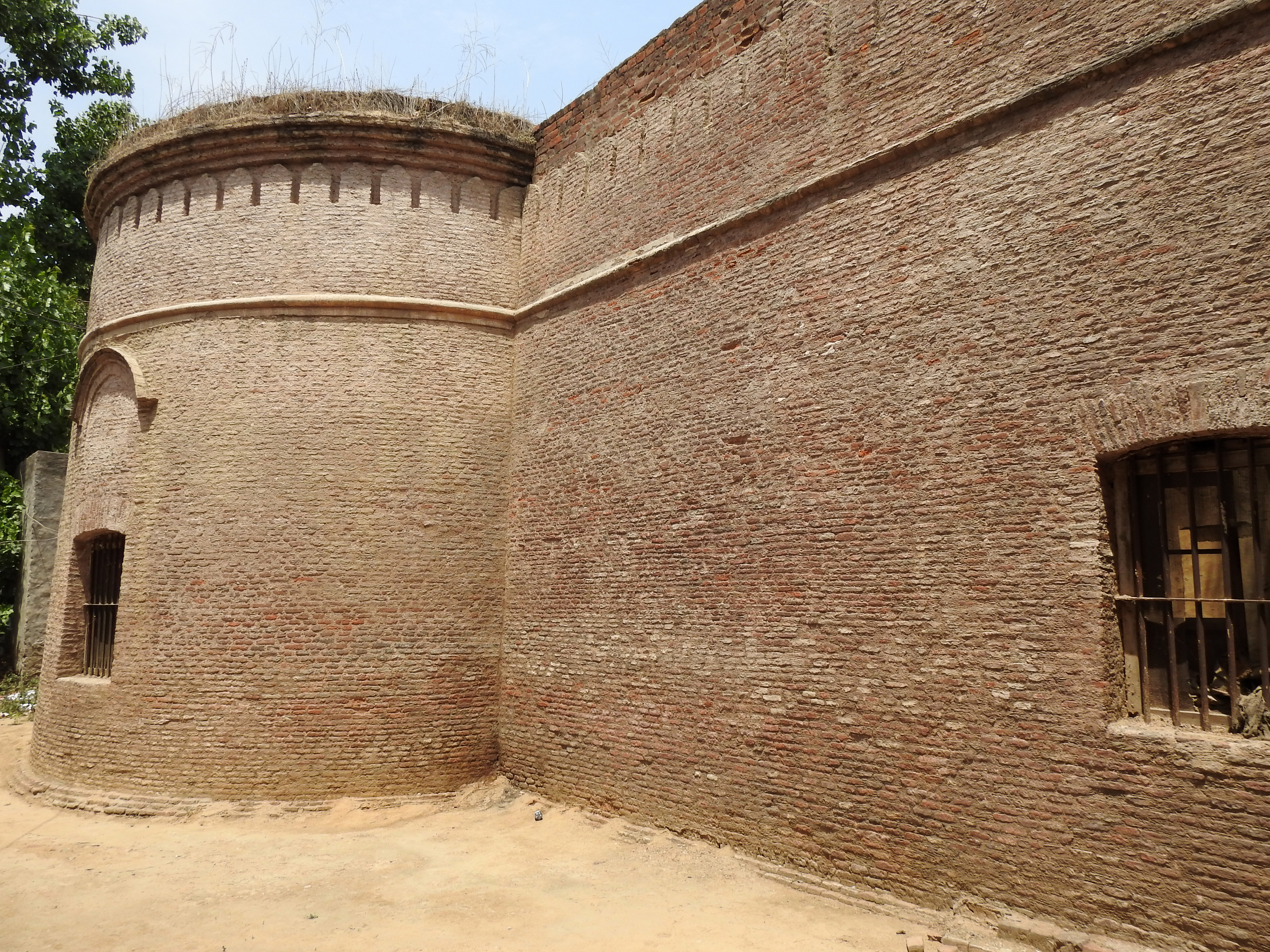
Pillar and main boundary wall from the entrance

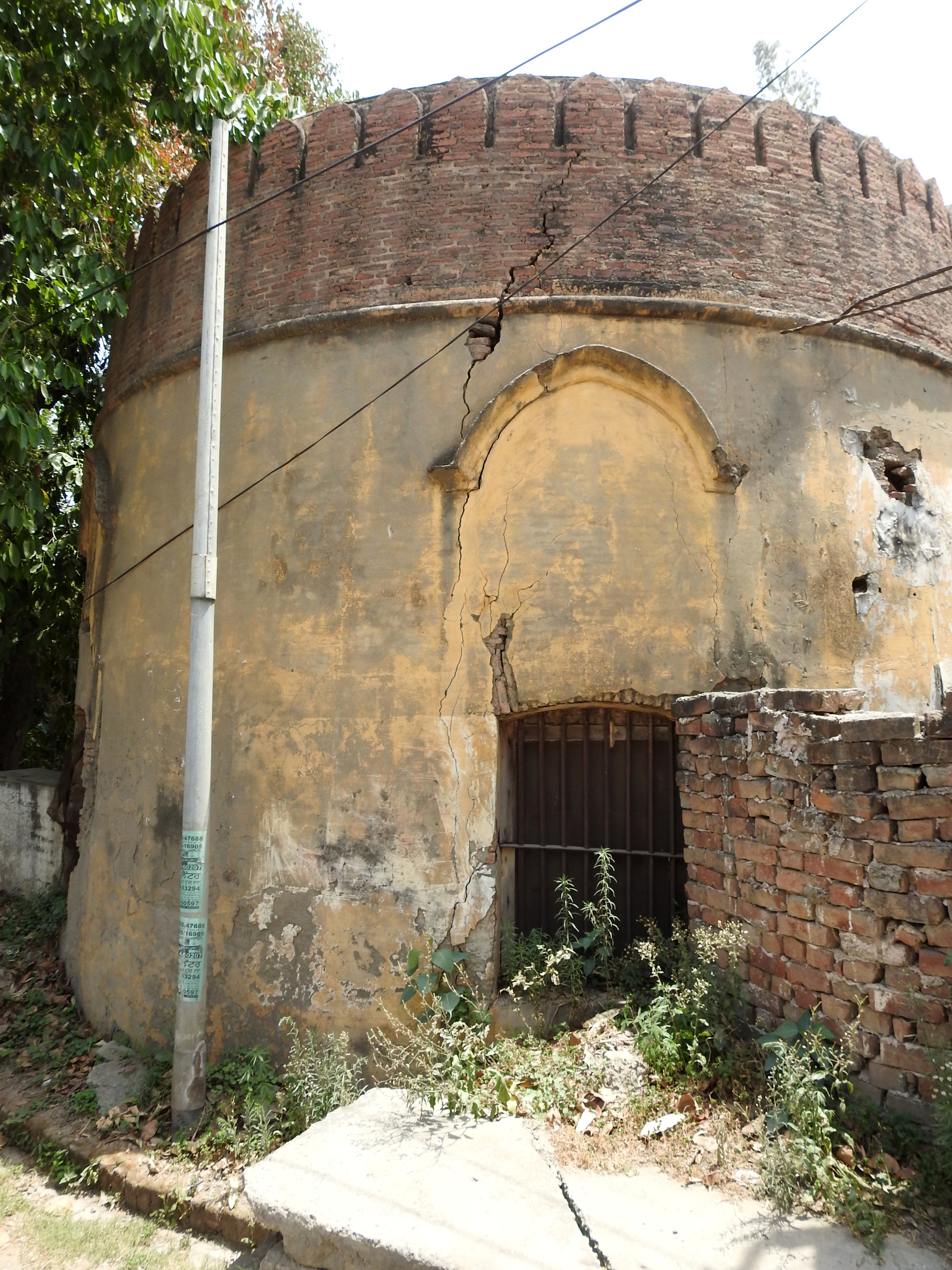
Outer left pillar from the main entrance

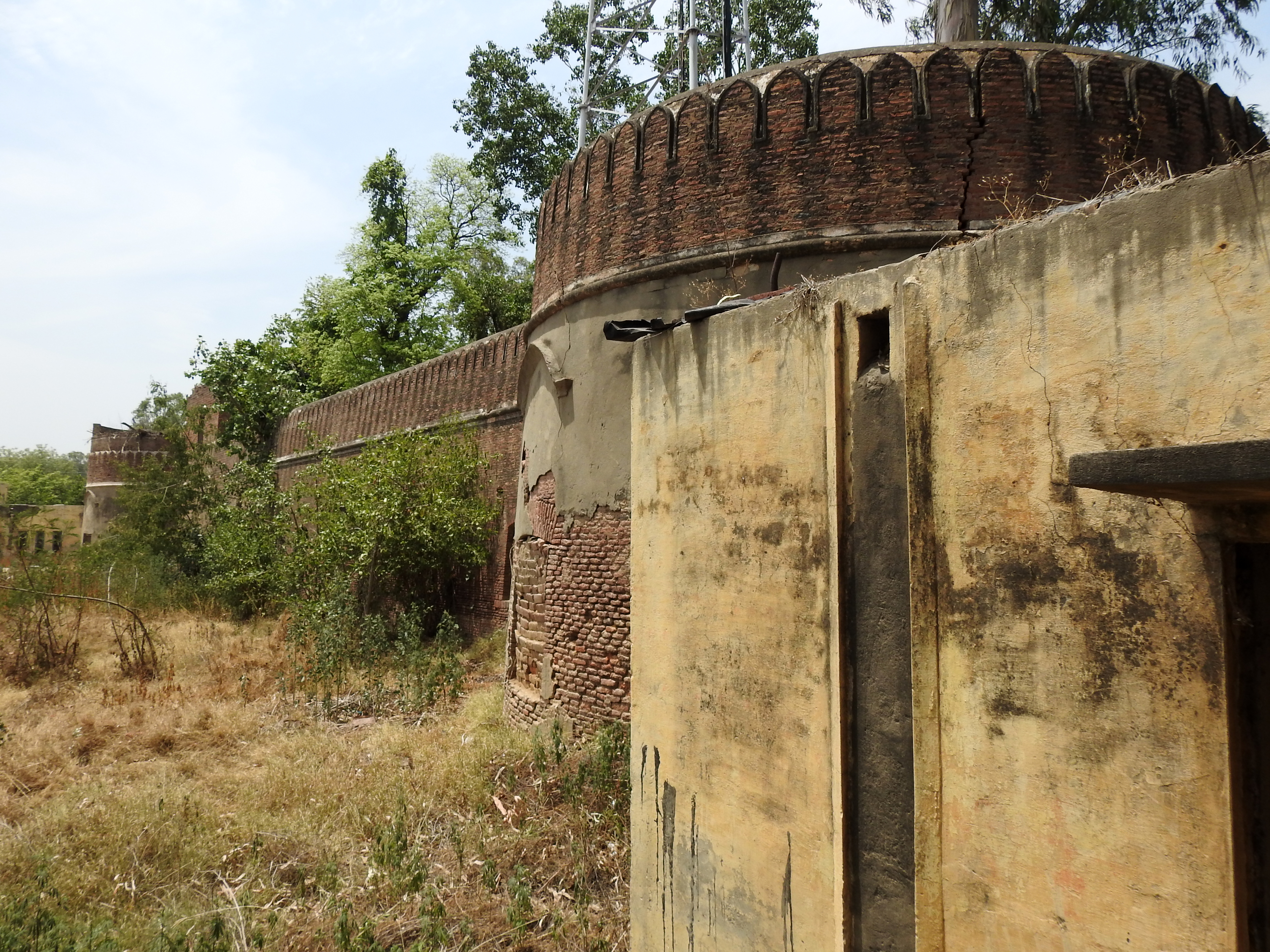
Outer pillar and boundary wall

== Demographics ==
As of 2011 census, Ajnala has a population of 21,107 of which 11,347 are males while 9,760 are females. Literacy rate of Ajnala is 82.19 %, higher than state average of 75.84 %. In Ajnala, male literacy is around 86.05 % while female literacy rate is 77.72 %. Ajnala Nagar Panchayat has total administration over 4,060 houses to which it supplies basic amenities. The population of children aged 0-6 is 2397 which is 11.36 % of total population of Ajnala (NP).

The table below shows the population of different religious groups in Ajnala city and their gender ratio, as of 2011 census.

Population by religious groups in Ajnala city, 2011 census
Religion	Total	Female	Male	Gender ratio
Sikh	11,122	5,283	5,839	904
Hindu	7,831	3,467	4,364	794
Christian	1,953	927	1,026	903
Muslim	166	69	97	711
Buddhist	3	1	2	500
Not stated	32	13	19	684
Total	21,107	9,760	11,347	860

== Politics ==
The city is part of the Ajnala Assembly Constituency.

== See also ==
- Gaggomahal
- Shaheedan da Khu
