= 2015 Kettering Borough Council election =

2015 UK local government election

← 2011	7 May 2015 (Note: Rothwell Ward's election was delayed to 4 June 2015 due to the death of a candidate.)	2021 (NN) →

All 36 seats in the Kettering Borough Council 19 seats needed for a majority
	First party	Second party
Party	Conservative	Labour
Last election	26	9
Seats won	27	8
Seat change	▲1	▼1
Popular vote	41,300	26,187
Percentage	47.7%	30.3%
- Map showing the results of the 2015 Kettering Borough Council elections.
Council control before election
Conservative
Council control after election
Conservative

The 2015 Kettering Borough Council election took place on 7 May 2015 to elect members of Kettering Borough Council in England. It was held on the same day as other local elections. The Conservative Party retained control of the council, which it had held since 2003. The election in Rothwell Ward was delayed until 4 June 2015 due to the death of a candidate.

== Ward results ==
=== All Saints Ward (2 seats) ===
Kettering Borough Council elections 2015: All Saints (3 seats)
Party	Candidate	Votes	%
Conservative	James Burton	1,456	
Conservative	Lesley Thurland	1,310	
Conservative	Greg Titcombe	1,116	
Labour	Julie-Anne Hands	1,087	
Labour	Richard Bowles	1,034	
Labour	Andrew Lockhart	1,015	
UKIP	Neil Manners	714	
Turnout		3,427	
Conservative hold			
Conservative gain from Labour			
Conservative gain from Labour			

=== Avondale Grange Ward (2 seats) ===
Kettering Borough Council elections 2015: Avondale Grange (2)
Party	Candidate	Votes	%
Labour	Linda Adams	729	
Labour	Clark Mitchell	678	
UKIP	Edward Brace	659	
UKIP	John Raffill	527	
Conservative	Carolyn Carter	516	
Conservative	Robin Carter	472	
Green	Keith Stafford	184	
Turnout		2,052	
Labour hold			
Labour hold			

=== Barton Ward (2 seats) ===
Kettering Borough Council elections 2015: Barton (2 seats)
Party	Candidate	Votes	%
Conservative	Russell Roberts	1,660	
Conservative	Stephen Bellamy	1,319	
Labour	Rona Gordon	683	
UKIP	Jonathan Court	792	
Labour	Ronald Steele	590	
Conservative hold			
Conservative hold			
Turnout		3,041	

=== Brambleside Ward (2 seats) ===
Brambleside (2 seats)
Party	Candidate	Votes	%
Conservative	Michael Brown	1,314	
Conservative	Ash Davies	1,155	
Labour	Adrian Chambers	631	
UKIP	Lee Ramsey	537	
Labour	Archibald Welsh	448	
English Democrat	Derek Hilling	114	
Turnout		2,583	
Conservative hold			
Conservative hold			

=== Burton Latimer Ward (3 seats) ===
Burton Latimer (3 seats)
Party	Candidate	Votes	%
Conservative	Jan Smith	1,631	
Independent	Ruth Groome	1,575	
Conservative	Derek Zanger	1,396	
Independent	Christopher Groome	1,286	
Independent	Fergus MacDonald	664	
Labour	Vanessa Armstrong	746	
Labour	Dominic Armstrong	711	
Labour	Theresa Conrad	590	
Turnout		4,222	
Conservative hold			
Independent hold			
Conservative hold			

=== Desborough Loatland Ward (2 seats) ===
Kettering Borough Council elections 2015: Desborough Loatland Ward
Party	Candidate	Votes	%
Conservative	Mark Dearing	1,386	
Conservative	June Derbyshire	1,295	
Labour	Joanne Watson	616	
Labour	Helen Wood	573	
UKIP	Kevin Stills	767	
Turnout		2,908	
Conservative hold			
Conservative hold			

=== Desborough St Giles Ward (2 seats) ===
Kettering Borough Council elections 2015: Desborough St Giles (2 seats)
Party	Candidate	Votes	%
Conservative	Mike Tebbutt	1,402	
Conservative	Dave Soans	1,156	
Labour	Ben King	746	
Labour	James Fox	693	
UKIP	Melvyn Norman	601	
Green	Alan Stephen Jones	298	
Turnout		2,768	
Conservative hold			
Conservative hold			

=== Ise Lodge (3 seats) ===
Kettering Borough Council elections 2015: Ise Lodge (3 seats))
Party	Candidate	Votes	%
Conservative	Philip Hollobone	2,418	
Conservative	Lloyd Bunday	1,674	
Conservative	Shirley Lynch	1,597	
Labour	Rhiannon Watts	1,088	
Labour	Lynsey Tod	703	
Labour	Arlette Wrighting	405	
Green	Michael Wright	254	
Turnout		4,000	
Conservative hold			
Conservative hold			
Conservative hold			

=== Northfield Ward (1 seat) ===
Kettering Borough Council elections 2015: Northfield (1 seat)
Party	Candidate	Votes	%
Labour	Jonathan West	503	
Conservative	Christina Smith-Haynes	353	
UKIP	Stewart Farrant	205	
Green	Heather Brunskelll-Evans	125	
Turnout		1,191	
Labour hold			

=== Piper's Hill Ward (2 seats) ===
Kettering Borough Council elections 2015: Piper's Hill (2 seats)
Party	Candidate	Votes	%
Conservative	Duncan Bain	1,166	
Labour	Anne-Marie Lee	888	
Conservative	Paul Marks	866	
UKIP	Kathleen Forsyth-Smith	673	
Labour	Harjinder Singh	575	
Green	James Dell	323	
Turnout		2,565	
Conservative hold			
Labour gain from Conservative			

=== Queen Eleanor & Buccleuch Ward (1 seat) ===
Kettering Borough Council elections 2015: Queen Eleanor & Buccleuch (1 seat)
Party	Candidate	Votes	%
Conservative	Mark Rowley	656	
Labour	John Padwick	462	
UKIP	Jonathan Bullock	422	
Green	Neil Bennett	69	
Turnout		1,61	
Conservative hold			

=== Rothwell (3 seats) ===
Kettering Borough Council elections 2015: Rothwell (3 seats)
Party	Candidate	Votes	%
Labour	Alan Mills	951	
Conservative	Karl Sumpter	853	
Conservative	Margaret Talbot	777	
Conservative	Ian Jelley	771	
Labour	Malcolm Jones	623	
Labour	Kathleen Harris	614	
UKIP	Sally Hogston	370	
Green	Robert Reeves	89	
Green	Robert Reeves	82	
Labour hold			
Conservative hold			
Conservative hold			

=== Slade Ward (2 seats) ===
Kettering Borough Council elections 2015: Slade (2 seats)
Party	Candidate	Votes	%
Conservative	James Hakewill	1,934	
Conservative	Cliff Moreton	1,805	
Labour	Stephen King	746	
Labour	Sally Hogston	695	
Labour	Shona Scrimshaw	531	
Green	Susanne Rees	344	
Conservative hold			
Conservative hold			

=== St Michaels & Wicksteed Ward (3 seats) ===
Kettering Borough Council elections 2015: St. Michael's & Wicksteed (3 seats)
Party	Candidate	Votes	%
Conservative	Scott Edwards	1,325	
Conservative	Jennifer Henson	1,288	
Labour	Margaret Don	1,040	
Conservative	John Laurence Henson	1,155	
Labour	Derek Lee	1,000	
Labour	Laurence Humphries	909	
UKIP	Jehad Aburamadan	839	
Green	Robert Reeves	609	
Turnout		3,323	
Conservative hold			
Conservative hold			
Labour hold			

=== St Peters Ward (2 seats) ===
Kettering Borough Council Elections 2015: St Peter's Ward
Party	Candidate	Votes	%
Conservative	Terence Freer	1,230	
Conservative	Mary Malin	1,038	
Labour	Ian Watts	768	
UKIP	Claire Sevier	563	
Green	Kirsty Berry	501	
Turnout		2,574	
Conservative hold			
Conservative hold			

=== Welland Ward (1 seat) ===
Kettering Borough Council elections 2015: Welland (1 seat)
Party	Candidate	Votes	%
Conservative	David Howes	1,130	
Labour	Peter Weston	351	
UKIP	Brent Woodford	245	
Turnout		1,745	
Conservative hold			

=== William Knibb Ward (2 seats) ===
Kettering Borough Council elections 2015: William Knibb (2 seats)
Party	Candidate	Votes	%
Labour	Keli Watts	852	
Labour	Mick Scrimshaw	844	
Conservative	Karen Stanley	677	
UKIP	Roland Shipham	378	
Green	Katie Harrison	348	
UKIP	Susan Shipham	321	
Turnout		2,155	
Labour hold			
Labour hold			
