= 2011 Kettering Borough Council election =

2011 UK local government election

- 5 May 2011

All 36 seats in the Kettering Borough Council 19 seats needed for a majority
	First party	Second party
Party	Conservative	Labour
Last election	28	6
Seats won	26	9
Seat change	▼2	▲3
- Map showing the results of the 2011 Kettering Borough Council elections.
Council control before election
Conservative
Council control after election
Conservative

The 2011 Kettering Borough Council election took place on 5 May 2011 to elect members of Kettering Borough Council in England. It was held on the same day as other local elections. The Conservative Party retained control of the council, which it had held since 2003.

== Ward results ==
=== All Saints Ward (2 seats) ===
Kettering Borough Council elections 2011: All Saints (3 seats)
Party	Candidate	Votes	%	±%
Conservative	Michael Brown	1,019		
Labour	Michelle George	1,005		
Labour	Jonathan West	1,000		
Conservative	Greg Titcombe	954		
Labour	Steve King	898		
Conservative	Chris Smith-Haynes	876		
Turnout			38.1	
Conservative hold		Swing		
Labour gain from Conservative		Swing		
Labour hold		Swing		

=== Avondale Grange Ward (2 seats) ===
Kettering Borough Council elections 2011: Avondale Grange (2)
Party	Candidate	Votes	%	±%
Labour	Linda Adams	696		
Labour	Paul Corazzo	639		
Conservative	Eve Edwards	320		
Conservative	Kenneth Muir Jack	279		
BNP	Clive Skinner	279		
Turnout			30.5	
Labour hold		Swing		
Labour hold		Swing		

=== Barton Ward (2 seats) ===
Kettering Borough Council elections 2011: Barton (2 seats)
Party	Candidate	Votes	%	±%
Conservative	Russell Roberts	1,086		
Conservative	Christopher Lamb	1,081		
Labour	Rona Gordon	618		
Labour	George Ross	543		
Turnout		1,819	44.2	
Conservative hold		Swing		
Conservative hold		Swing		

=== Brambleside Ward (2 seats) ===
Brambleside (2 seats)
Party	Candidate	Votes	%	±%
Conservative	Maurice Bayes	723		
Conservative	Paul Marks	660		
Labour	Adrian Chambers	598		
Labour	Susan Holmes	435		
English Democrat	Derek Hilling	349		
Turnout		1,617	44.4	
Conservative hold		Swing		
Conservative hold		Swing		

=== Burton Latimer Ward (3 seats) ===
Burton Latimer (3 seats)
Party	Candidate	Votes	%	±%
Independent	Ruth Groome	896		
Conservative	Derek Zanger	878		
Conservative	Jan Smith	863		
Independent	Christopher Groome	797		
Conservative	Fergus MacDonald	777		
Independent	Jean Holyhead	488		
Labour	Keith Adams	472		
Labour	David Williams	310		
Labour	Derek Lee	318		
Turnout		2,159	38.3	
Independent hold		Swing		
Conservative gain from Independent		Swing		
Conservative hold		Swing		

=== Desborough Loatland Ward (2 seats) ===
Kettering Borough Council elections 2011: Desborough Loatland Ward
Party	Candidate	Votes	%	±%
Conservative	June Derbyshire	848		
Conservative	Mark Dearing	839		
Labour	Derek Fox	616		
Labour	Joanne Watson	573		
Turnout		1,558	38.6	
Conservative hold		Swing		
Conservative hold		Swing		

=== Desborough St Giles Ward (2 seats) ===
Kettering Borough Council elections 2011: Desborough St Giles (2 seats)
Party	Candidate	Votes	%	±%
Conservative	Mike Tebbutt	1,022		
Conservative	Dave Soans	849		
Labour	Ben King	714		
Labour	Lynsey Tod	679		
Liberal Democrats	Philip Rice	201		
Liberal Democrats	Alan Window	161		
Turnout		1,939	48.5	
Conservative hold		Swing		
Conservative hold		Swing		

=== Ise Lodge (3 seats) ===
Kettering Borough Council elections 2011: Ise Lodge (3 seats))
Party	Candidate	Votes	%	±%
Conservative	Philip Hollobone	1,518		
Conservative	Lloyd Bunday	1,259		
Conservative	Shirley Lynch	1,214		
Labour	Anne Lee	655		
Labour	Adrian Perrin	564		
Labour	Brenda McCraith	559		
Liberal Democrats	Chris Nelson	445		
Liberal Democrats	Ben Timberley	331		
Liberal Democrats	Trevor Timberley	254		
Turnout		2,560	45.5	
Conservative hold		Swing		
Conservative hold		Swing		
Conservative hold		Swing		

=== Northfield Ward (1 seat) ===
Kettering Borough Council elections 2011: Northfield (1 seat)
Party	Candidate	Votes	%	±%
Labour	Ellie Manns	402		
Conservative	David Gunn	294		
Turnout		696	34.1	
Labour hold		Swing		

=== Piper's Hill Ward (2 seats) ===
Kettering Borough Council elections 2011: Piper's Hill (2 seats)
Party	Candidate	Votes	%	±%
Conservative	Duncan Bain	789		
Conservative	Steve Bellamy	741		
Labour	Roxanne Perrin	547		
Labour	Sushila Wright	423		
Independent	Glenn Binley	322		
Turnout		1,622	39.5	
Conservative hold		Swing		
Conservative hold		Swing		

=== Queen Eleanor & Buccleuch Ward (1 seat) ===
Kettering Borough Council elections 2011: Queen Eleanor & Buccleuch (1 seat)
Party	Candidate	Votes	%	±%
Conservative	Jonathan Bullock	688		
Labour	John Padwick	599		
Turnout		1294	62.5	
Conservative hold		Swing		

=== Rothwell (3 seats) ===
Kettering Borough Council elections 2011: Rothwell (3 seats)
Party	Candidate	Votes	%	±%
Conservative	Ian Jelley	1,103		
Conservative	Margaret Talbot	1,079		
Labour	Alan Mills	1,077		
Conservative	Neil Matthew	1052		
Labour	Mark Hughes	847		
Labour	Martin Fage	778		
Independent	Alan Pote	616		
Turnout		2,546	42.4	
Conservative hold		Swing		
Conservative hold		Swing		
Labour gain from Conservative		Swing		

=== Slade Ward (2 seats) ===
Kettering Borough Council elections 2011: Slade (2 seats)
Party	Candidate	Votes	%	±%
Conservative	Cliff Moreton	1,389		
Conservative	James Hakewill	1,344		
Labour	Shona Scrimshaw	619		
Labour	David Williams	581		
Turnout		2,204	47.8	
Conservative hold		Swing		
Conservative hold		Swing		

=== St Michaels & Wicksteed Ward (3 seats) ===
Kettering Borough Council elections 2011: St. Michael's & Wicksteed (3 seats)
Party	Candidate	Votes	%	±%
Conservative	Scott Edwards	1,114		
Conservative	Jenny Henson	1,059		
Labour	Maggie Don	1,040		
Conservative	Larry Henson	1,039		
Labour	Eileen Hales	999		
Labour	Ron Steele	956		
Turnout		2,288	41.0	
Conservative hold		Swing		
Conservative hold		Swing		
Labour gain from Conservative		Swing		

=== St Peters Ward (2 seats) ===
Kettering Borough Council Elections 2011: St Peter's Ward
Party	Candidate	Votes	%	±%
Conservative	Terry Freer	922		
Conservative	Mary Malin	861		
Labour	Mick Scrimshaw	458		
Labour	Cassie Watts	432		
English Democrat	Kevin Stills	233		
Turnout		1,634	44.4	
Conservative hold		Swing		
Conservative hold		Swing		

=== Welland Ward (1 seat) ===
Kettering Borough Council elections 2011: Welland (1 seat)
Party	Candidate	Votes	%	±%
Conservative	Alison Wiley	834		
Labour	Peter Weston	405		
Turnout		1,238	56.1	
Conservative hold		Swing		

=== William Knibb Ward (2 seats) ===
Kettering Borough Council elections 2011: William Knibb (2 seats)
Party	Candidate	Votes	%	±%
Labour	Keli Watts	762		
Labour	David Bishop	706		
Conservative	David Howes	541		
Conservative	Jehad Soliman	442		
Turnout		1,359	35.2	
Labour hold		Swing		
Labour hold		Swing		
