= Kettering Borough Council elections =

Local government elections in Northamptonshire, England

Kettering Borough Council was the local authority for the Borough of Kettering in Northamptonshire, England and was elected every four years. The district was abolished in 2021, with the area becoming part of North Northamptonshire.

== Political control ==
The first election was held in 1973. The council then acted as a shadow authority alongside the outgoing authorities until 1 April 1974 when it formally came into being. From 1974 until its abolition in 2021, political control of the council was as follows:

| Party in control | Years |
|---|---|
| No overall control | 1974–1983 |
| Conservative | 1983–1987 |
| No overall control | 1987–1995 |
| Labour | 1995–1999 |
| No overall control | 1999–2001 |
| Labour | 2001–2003 |
| Conservative | 2003–2021 |

=== Leadership ===
The leaders of the council from 2007 until the council's abolition in 2021 were:

| Councillor | Party | From | To |
|---|---|---|---|
| Terry Freer | Conservative | | 16 May 2007 |
| Jim Hakewill | Conservative | 16 May 2007 | 18 May 2011 |
| Russell Roberts | Conservative | 18 May 2011 | 31 Mar 2021 |

Russell Roberts also served as leader of the shadow authority for the replacement North Northamptonshire Council until it formally came into being in 2021.

== Council elections ==
- 1973 Kettering Borough Council election
- 1976 Kettering Borough Council election
- 1979 Kettering Borough Council election (new ward boundaries)
- 1983 Kettering Borough Council election
- 1987 Kettering Borough Council election
- 1991 Kettering Borough Council election
- 1995 Kettering Borough Council election
- 1999 Kettering Borough Council election (new ward boundaries)
- 2003 Kettering Borough Council election
- 2007 Kettering Borough Council election (New ward boundaries reduced the number of seats by 9.)
- 2011 Kettering Borough Council election
- 2015 Kettering Borough Council election

== Election results ==
| | Overall control | Conservative | Labour | Lib Dem | Independent |
| 2015 | Conservative | 27 | 8 | - | 1 |
| 2011 | Conservative | 26 | 9 | - | 1 |
| 2007 | Conservative | 28 | 6 | - | 2 |
| 2003 | Conservative | 30 | 13 | - | 2 |
| 1999 | NOC | 18 | 22 | 1 | 4 |

== Borough result maps ==
2003 results map

2007 results map

2011 results map

2015 results map

== Borough council by-election results ==
=== May 1995 - May 1999 ===
St Andrews by-election, 20 June 1996
| Party | Candidate | Votes | % | ±% |
|---|---|---|---|---|
| Labour | | 645 | 64.2 | |
| Conservative | | 158 | 15.7 | |
| Liberal Democrats | | 148 | 14.7 | |
| National Democrat | | 55 | 5.4 | |
| Majority | | 488 | 48.5 | |
| Turnout | | 1,006 | | |
| Labour hold | | Swing | | |

St Michael's by-election, 21 August 1997
| Party | Candidate | Votes | % | ±% |
|---|---|---|---|---|
| Labour | | 359 | 42.3 | −14.1 |
| Conservative | | 320 | 37.7 | +5.0 |
| Liberal Democrats | | 170 | 20.0 | +9.0 |
| Majority | | 39 | 4.6 | |
| Turnout | | 849 | 30.0 | |
| Labour hold | | Swing | | |

Avondale by-election, 18 September 1997
| Party | Candidate | Votes | % | ±% |
|---|---|---|---|---|
| Labour | | 394 | 77.0 | +24.5 |
| Conservative | | 82 | 16.0 | +8.6 |
| Liberal Democrats | | 36 | 7.0 | +7.0 |
| Majority | | 312 | 61.0 | |
| Turnout | | 512 | 15.7 | |
| Labour hold | | Swing | | |

Kingsley by-election, 18 September 1997
| Party | Candidate | Votes | % | ±% |
|---|---|---|---|---|
| Labour | | 395 | 43.7 | +2.7 |
| Conservative | | 351 | 38.9 | +12.3 |
| Liberal Democrats | | 157 | 17.4 | −15.0 |
| Majority | | 44 | 4.8 | |
| Turnout | | 903 | 26.9 | |
| Labour hold | | Swing | | |

Loatland by-election, 6 November 1997
| Party | Candidate | Votes | % | ±% |
|---|---|---|---|---|
| Conservative | | 338 | 43.4 | +22.8 |
| Labour | | 331 | 41.5 | −14.6 |
| Liberal Democrats | | 129 | 16.2 | −7.2 |
| Majority | | 7 | 1.9 | |
| Turnout | | 798 | 27.8 | |
| Conservative gain from Labour | | Swing | | |

=== May 1999 - May 2003 ===
Millbrook by-election, 20 September 2001
| Party | Candidate | Votes | % | ±% |
|---|---|---|---|---|
| Conservative | Shirley Lynch | 410 | 50.8 | +11.3 |
| Labour | Mervyn Hart | 246 | 30.5 | −5.1 |
| Liberal Democrats | Terry Freeman | 151 | 18.7 | −6.2 |
| Majority | | 164 | 20.3 | |
| Turnout | | 807 | 26.4 | |
| Conservative hold | | Swing | | |

St Michaels by-election, 20 September 2001
| Party | Candidate | Votes | % | ±% |
|---|---|---|---|---|
| Labour | Brenda McCraith | 426 | 46.9 | −4.3 |
| Conservative | Christina Smith | 398 | 43.8 | −5.0 |
| Liberal Democrats | Chris McGlynn | 84 | 9.3 | +9.3 |
| Majority | | 28 | 3.1 | |
| Turnout | | 908 | 33.4 | |
| Labour gain from Conservative | | Swing | | |

Warkton by-election, 18 July 2002
| Party | Candidate | Votes | % | ±% |
|---|---|---|---|---|
| Labour | Linda Adams | 529 | 60.4 | −2.8 |
| Conservative | Keith Marsh | 347 | 39.6 | +2.8 |
| Majority | | 187 | 20.8 | |
| Turnout | | 846 | 32 | |
| Labour hold | | Swing | | |

=== May 2003 - May 2007 ===
Latimer by-election, 28 July 2005
| Party | Candidate | Votes | % | ±% |
|---|---|---|---|---|
| Conservative | Patricia Evans | 278 | 45.5 | +8.3 |
| Labour | David Bishop | 152 | 24.9 | +12.2 |
| Independent | Maureen Jerram | 133 | 21.8 | −28.4 |
| Liberal Democrats | Stuart Simons | 47 | 7.7 | +7.7 |
| Majority | | 126 | 20.9 | |
| Turnout | | 610 | 24.6 | −6.8 |
| Conservative hold | | Swing | | |

Wicksteed by-election, 6 October 2005
| Party | Candidate | Votes | % | ±% |
|---|---|---|---|---|
| Labour | Lynsey Tod | 464 | 49.7 | −0.2 |
| Conservative | Scott Edwards | 374 | 40.0 | −10.1 |
| Liberal Democrats | Christopher McGlynn | 96 | 10.3 | +10.3 |
| Majority | | 90 | 9.7 | |
| Turnout | | 934 | 35.4 | +2.8 |
| Labour gain from Conservative | | Swing | | |

St Mary's by-election, 17 November 2005
| Party | Candidate | Votes | % | ±% |
|---|---|---|---|---|
| Labour | Shona Scrimshaw | 674 | 60.9 | +11.4 |
| Conservative | Katherine Stallard | 362 | 32.7 | −17.8 |
| Liberal Democrats | Alan Window | 71 | 6.4 | +6.4 |
| Majority | | 312 | 28.2 | |
| Turnout | | 1,107 | 26.7 | |
| Labour hold | | Swing | | |

=== May 2007 - May 2011 ===
Northfield by-election, 1 October 2009
| Party | Candidate | Votes | % | ±% |
|---|---|---|---|---|
| Labour | Eleanor Manns | 265 | 37.9 | −17.7 |
| Conservative | Stephen Bellamy | 258 | 36.9 | −7.6 |
| Liberal Democrats | Cindy McGrath | 80 | 11.4 | +11.4 |
| BNP | Clive Skinner | 58 | 8.3 | +8.3 |
| English Democrat | Kevin Sills | 39 | 5.6 | +5.6 |
| Majority | | 7 | 1.0 | |
| Turnout | | 700 | 35.2 | |
| Labour hold | | Swing | -5.0% | |

=== May 2011 - May 2015 ===
Avondale Grange by-election, 2 May 2013
| Party | Candidate | Votes | % | ±% |
|---|---|---|---|---|
| Labour | Eileen Kathleen Hales | 403 | 42.1 | −18.0 |
| UKIP | John Raffill | 325 | 34.0 | +34.0 |
| Conservative | Christina Elizabeth Smith-Haynes | 140 | 14.6 | −13.0 |
| English Democrat | Derek Hilling | 52 | 5.4 | +5.4 |
| Liberal Democrats | David James Tate | 37 | 3.9 | +3.9 |
| Majority | | 78 | 8.2% | |
| Turnout | | 957 | 24.6 | |
| Labour hold | | Swing | -26.0% | |

Welland by-election, 2 May 2013
| Party | Candidate | Votes | % | ±% |
|---|---|---|---|---|
| Conservative | David Alexander Howes | 429 | 43.2 | −24.1 |
| UKIP | Paul Richard Oakden | 295 | 29.7 | +29.7 |
| Labour | John David Padwick | 199 | 20.1 | −12.6 |
| Liberal Democrats | Stanley Roy Freeman | 55 | 5.5 | +5.5 |
| English Democrat | Kevin John Sills | 14 | 1.4 | +1.4 |
| Majority | | 134 | 13.5 | |
| Turnout | | 992 | 44.5 | |
| Conservative hold | | Swing | -26.9% | |

=== May 2015 - May 2021 ===
Rothwell by-election, 20 October 2016
| Party | Candidate | Votes | % | ±% |
|---|---|---|---|---|
| Conservative | Cedwien Brown | 700 | 48.3 | +10.6 |
| Labour | Kathleen Harris | 498 | 34.4 | −6.7 |
| UKIP | Sam Watts | 108 | 7.5 | −8.5 |
| Green | Stephen Jones | 75 | 5.2 | +0.0 |
| Liberal Democrats | Malcolm Adcock | 67 | 4.6 | N/A |
| Majority | | 202 | 13.9 | |
| Turnout | | 1,451 | 22.8 | |
| Conservative gain from Labour | | Swing | | |

Barton by-election, 23 February 2017
| Party | Candidate | Votes | % | ±% |
|---|---|---|---|---|
| Liberal Democrats | Andrew Dutton | 644 | 57% | +57% |
| Conservative | Dianne Miles-Zanger | 337 | 29.8% | −19.3% |
| UKIP | Robert Clements | 106 | 9.4% | −14% |
| Green | Robert Reeves | 42 | 3.9% | −15.6% |
| Majority | | 327 | 27.2 | |
| Turnout | | 1,129 | | |
| Liberal Democrats gain from Conservative | | Swing | | |

Burton Latimer by-election, 4 May 2017
| Party | Candidate | Votes | % | ±% |
|---|---|---|---|---|
| Conservative | John Currall | 641 | 33.1 | +2.1 |
| Independent | Christopher Groome | 531 | 27.5 | −2.4 |
| UKIP | Sam Watts | 269 | 13.9 | −11.1 |
| Labour | Samuel Nicholls | 264 | 13.7 | −0.5 |
| Liberal Democrats | Jenny Davies | 189 | 9.8 | +9.8 |
| Green | April Wright | 40 | 2.1 | +2.1 |
| Majority | | 110 | 5.7 | |
| Turnout | | 1,934 | | |
| Conservative hold | | Swing | | |

St Peter's by-election, 4 May 2017
| Party | Candidate | Votes | % | ±% |
|---|---|---|---|---|
| Conservative | Paul Marks | 774 | 57.3 | +17.1 |
| Labour | Eugene Dalton-Ruark | 323 | 23.9 | −1.2 |
| Liberal Democrats | Chris McGlynn | 98 | 7.3 | +7.3 |
| Green | Geri Coop | 93 | 6.9 | −9.5 |
| UKIP | Stewart Farrant | 63 | 4.7 | −13.7 |
| Majority | | 451 | 33.4 | |
| Turnout | | 1,351 | | |
| Conservative hold | | Swing | | |

Desborough St Giles by-election, 12 December 2019
| Party | Candidate | Votes | % | ±% |
|---|---|---|---|---|
| Conservative | Jim French | 1,475 | 52.8 | +6.8 |
| Labour | Phil Sawford | 1,007 | 36.1 | +11.6 |
| Liberal Democrats | Alan Window | 196 | 7.0 | +7.0 |
| Green | Daz Dell | 115 | 4.1 | −5.7 |
| Majority | | 468 | 16.8 | |
| Turnout | | 2,793 | | |
| Conservative hold | | Swing | | |

== Parish & town council by-election results ==
=== May 2003 - May 2007 ===
Loatland by-election (Desborough Town Council), 26 February 2004
| Party | Candidate | Votes | % | ±% |
|---|---|---|---|---|
| Conservative | Nicholas Dodsworth | 614 | 66.9 | |
| Labour | Derek Fox | 303 | 33.1 | |
| Majority | | 311 | | |
| Turnout | | 918 | 26.46 | |
| Conservative hold | | Swing | | |

Plessy by-election (Burton Latimer Town Council), 15 April 2004
| Party | Candidate | Votes | % | ±% |
|---|---|---|---|---|
| Conservative | Martin Wightman | 490 | 74.9 | |
| Labour | David Bishop | 164 | 25.1 | |
| Majority | | 326 | | |
| Turnout | | +66 | 24.30 | |
| Conservative hold | | Swing | | |

Latimer by-election (Burton Latimer Town Council), 28 October 2004
| Party | Candidate | Votes | % | ±% |
|---|---|---|---|---|
| Conservative | James Richardson | 258 | 64.0 | |
| Independent | Stuart Simons | 145 | 36.0 | |
| Majority | | 105 | | |
| Turnout | | 403 | | |
| Conservative hold | | Swing | | |

Trinity by-election (Rothwell Town Council), 17 March 2005
| Party | Candidate | Votes | % | ±% |
|---|---|---|---|---|
| Conservative | Neil Matthew | 491 | 52.2 | |
| Labour | Carol Mullett | 374 | 39.7 | |
| Independent | Alan Glover | 76 | 8.1 | |
| Majority | | 117 | | |
| Turnout | | | | |
| Conservative hold | | Swing | | |

Plessy by-election (Burton Latimer Town Council), 28 July 2005
| Party | Candidate | Votes | % | ±% |
|---|---|---|---|---|
| Conservative | Peter Bettles | 268 | 41.9 | |
| Independent | Nigel Padget | 212 | 33.1 | |
| Labour | Christopher Jack | 160 | 25.0 | |
| Majority | | 56 | | |
| Turnout | | | | |
| Conservative hold | | Swing | | |

Trinity by-election (Rothwell Town Council), 9 February 2006
| Party | Candidate | Votes | % | ±% |
|---|---|---|---|---|
| Labour | Carol Mullett | 533 | 50.1 | |
| Conservative | Karl Sumpter | 531 | 49.9 | |
| Majority | | 2 | | |
| Turnout | | | | |
| Labour hold | | Swing | | |

=== May 2007 - May 2011 ===
St Boltophs by-election (Barton Seagrave Parish Council), 13 December 2007
| Party | Candidate | Votes | % | ±% |
|---|---|---|---|---|
| Conservative | Adrian Lee | 323 | 65.1 | |
| Labour | Christopher Haynes | 173 | 34.9 | |
| Majority | | 150 | 30.2 | |
| Turnout | | 496 | 25.9 | |
| Conservative gain from Labour | | Swing | | |

Trinity by-election (Rothwell Town Council), 27 March 2008
| Party | Candidate | Votes | % | ±% |
|---|---|---|---|---|
| Conservative | Roy Roebuck | 487 | 49.1 | −8.9 |
| Labour | Alex Hughes | 337 | 34.0 | −8.2 |
| Liberal Democrats | Daniel Garside | 167 | 16.9 | +16.9 |
| Majority | | 150 | 15.1 | −0.4 |
| Turnout | | 991 | 32.8 | −9.4 |
| Conservative hold | | Swing | | |

Latimer by-election (Burton Latimer Town Council), 27 March 2008
| Party | Candidate | Votes | % | ±% |
|---|---|---|---|---|
| Conservative | Jan Smith | 290 | 65.0 | |
| Independent | Karen Elmore | 156 | 35.0 | |
| Majority | | 134 | 30.0 | |
| Turnout | | 446 | 17.2 | |
| Conservative hold | | Swing | | |

Trinity by-election (Rothwell Town Council), 18 September 2008
| Party | Candidate | Votes | % | ±% |
|---|---|---|---|---|
| Conservative | Leisa Russell | 487 | 52.5 | +4.4 |
| Labour | Glenda Weston | 373 | 41.0 | +6.0 |
| Liberal Democrats | Daniel Garside | 59 | 6.5 | −10.4 |
| Majority | | 104 | 11.3 | −3.8 |
| Turnout | | 919 | 31.0 | −1.8 |
| Conservative hold | | Swing | | |

Tresham by-election (Rothwell Town Council), 28 January 2010
| Party | Candidate | Votes | % | ±% |
|---|---|---|---|---|
| Conservative | Ian Jelley | 361 | 45.1 | −12.1 |
| Labour | Martin Fage | 267 | 33.4 | −9.4 |
| English Democrat | Kevin Sills | 88 | 11.0 | +11.0 |
| Liberal Democrats | John Holt | 84 | 10.5 | +10.5 |
| Majority | | 94 | 11.8 | −2.6 |
| Turnout | | 800 | 27.3 | −13.2 |
| Conservative hold | | Swing | | |

Latimer by-election (Burton Latimer Town Council), 24 June 2010
| Party | Candidate | Votes | % | ±% |
|---|---|---|---|---|
| Conservative | Kevin Edwards | 268 | 55.1 | −9.9 |
| Independent | Andrew Walpole | 152 | 31.3 | −3.7 |
| Liberal Democrats | Michael Quinn | 66 | 13.6 | +13.6 |
| Majority | | 116 | 23.9 | −6.2 |
| Turnout | | 488 | 18.9 | +1.7 |
| Conservative gain from Independent | | Swing | | |

=== May 2011 - May 2015 ===
Loatland by-election (Desborough Town Council), 19 July 2012
| Party | Candidate | Votes | % | ±% |
|---|---|---|---|---|
| Labour | Benjamin James King | 433 | 40.5 | |
| Conservative | Daniel Thomas Howes | 382 | 35.7 | |
| English Democrat | Kevin John Sills | 152 | 14.2 | |
| BNP | Clive Richard Skinner | 64 | 6.0 | |
| Liberal Democrats | Philip Donald Rice | 38 | 3.6 | |
| Majority | | 51 | 4.8 | |
| Turnout | | 1070 | 25.2 | |
| Labour gain from Conservative | | Swing | | |

Trinity by-election (Rothwell Town Council), 19 July 2012
| Party | Candidate | Votes | % | ±% |
|---|---|---|---|---|
| Labour | Kathleen Margaret Draper | 454 | 53.0 | |
| Conservative | Michelle Ann Johnston | 374 | 43.6 | |
| Liberal Democrats | Alan James Window | 26 | 3.0 | |
| Majority | | 80 | | |
| Turnout | | 857 | 27.6 | |
| Labour gain from Conservative | | Swing | | |

St Giles by-election (Desborough Town Council), 3 October 2013
| Party | Candidate | Votes | % | ±% |
|---|---|---|---|---|
| Conservative | Daniel Thomas Howes | 473 | 42.0 | |
| Labour | Richard Francis Garvie | 385 | 34.2 | |
| UKIP | Kelly Ann Farrant | 198 | 17.6 | |
| Liberal Democrats | Alan James Window | 47 | 4.2 | |
| BNP | Clive Richard Skinner | 19 | 1.7 | |
| Majority | | 88 | 7.8 | |
| Turnout | | 1126 | 28.0 | |
| Conservative hold | | Swing | | |
