= Spinney (ward) =

Spinney Ward (Kettering Borough Council)

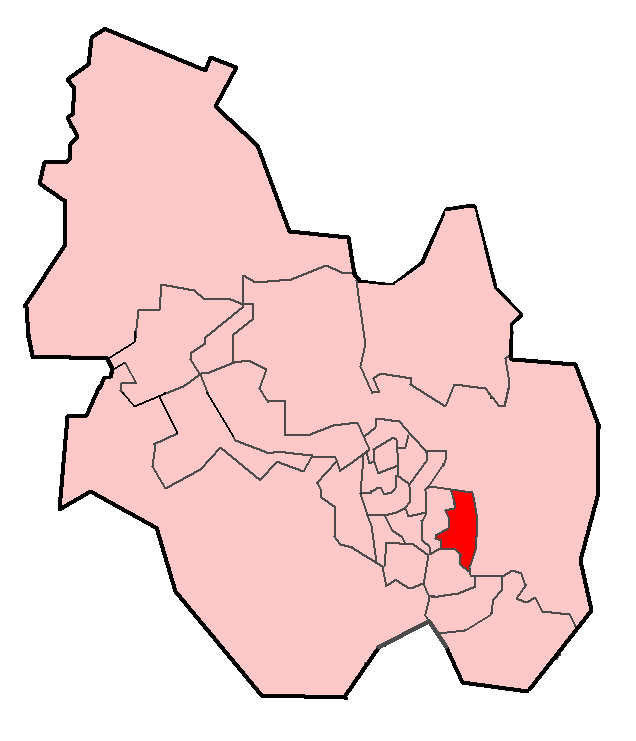
Spinney within Kettering Borough

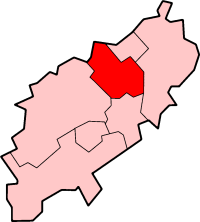
Kettering Borough within Northamptonshire

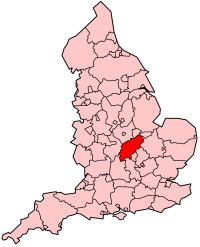
Northamptonshire within England

Spinney is a two-member ward within Kettering Borough Council, in Northamptonshire, England.

It was established in boundary changes before the 1999 elections. The ward was last fought at borough council level in the 2003 local council elections, in which both seats were held by the Conservatives.

The most recent councillors prior to the ward's abolition were Cllr. Bob Civil and Cllr. Matthew Lynch.

== Councillors ==
Kettering Borough Council elections 2003

- Cllr. Bob Civil (Conservative)
- Cllr. Matthew Lynch (Conservative)

Kettering Borough Council elections 1999

- Cllr. Bob Civil (Conservative)
- Cllr. Matthew Lynch (Conservative)

== Election results ==
=== Kettering Borough Council elections 2003 ===
Kettering Borough Council elections 2003: Spinney Ward
| Party | Candidate | Votes | % | ±% |
|---|---|---|---|---|
| Conservative | Bob Civil (E) | 446 | 33.1 | +5.5 |
| Conservative | Matt Lynch (E) | 394 | 29.3 | +7.1 |
| Liberal Democrats | John Turnbull | 157 | 11.7 | −5.8 |
| Liberal Democrats | Chris McGlynn | 147 | 10.9 | −1.8 |
| Labour | Adrian Chambers | 109 | 8.1 | −2.2 |
| Labour | Alfred Elderton | 94 | 7.0 | −2.8 |

Ward summary
| Party | Votes | % votes | % change | Seats | Change |
|---|---|---|---|---|---|
| Conservative | 420 | 62.4 | +29.2 | 2 | 0 |
| Liberal Democrats | 152 | 22.6 | -19.1 | 0 | 0 |
| Labour | 102 | 15.1 | -10.1 | 0 | 0 |
| Total votes cast | 674 | | | | |
| Electorate | 3,230 | | | | |
| Turnout | 20.9% | | | | |

(Vote count shown is ward average.)

=== Kettering Borough Council elections 1999 ===
This seat was established in boundary changes implemented at the time of this election.

Kettering Borough Council Elections 1999: Spinney Ward
| Party | Candidate | Votes | % | ±% |
|---|---|---|---|---|
| Conservative | Bob Civil (E) | 568 | 27.6 | |
| Conservative | Matt Lynch (E) | 457 | 22.2 | |
| Liberal Democrats | Terry Freeman | 359 | 17.4 | |
| Liberal Democrats | Stuart Simons | 261 | 12.7 | |
| Labour | Alfred Elderton | 212 | 10.3 | |
| Labour | David Williams | 202 | 9.8 | |

Ward summary
| Party | Votes | % votes | Seats | Change |
|---|---|---|---|---|
| Conservative | 513 | 49.8 | 2 | |
| Liberal Democrats | 310 | 30.1 | 0 | |
| Labour | 207 | 20.1 | 0 | |
| Total votes cast | 839 | | | |
| Electorate | | | | |
| Turnout | | | | |

(Vote count shown is ward average.)

== See also ==
- Kettering
- Kettering Borough Council

| Preceded by Ise Valley Ward (with Millbrook Ward) | ward of Kettering Borough Council; 1999-2007 | Succeeded by Ise Lodge Ward (with Millbrook Ward) and Barton Ward (revised) (with Barton Ward (previous)) |
