= 2003 Kettering Borough Council election =

Regional election

Kettering Borough Council

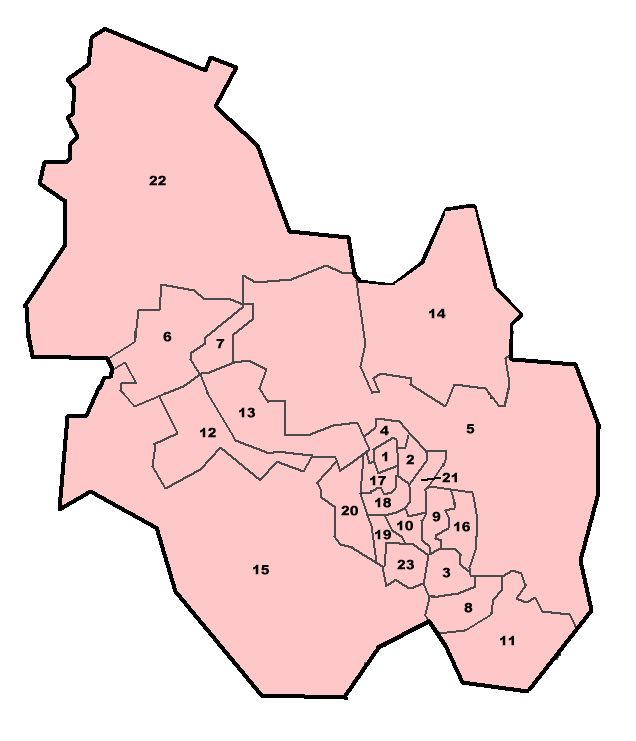
Kettering Borough Council ward map: 1. All Saints 2. Avondale 3. Barton Seagrave, 4. Brambleside 5. Buccleuch 6. Desborough Loatland 7. Desborough St. Giles, 8. Latimer (Burton Latimer), 9. Millbrook 10. Piper's Hill 11. Plessy (Burton Latimer) 12. Rothwell Tresham 13. Rothwell Trinity 14. Queen Eleanor 15. Slade 16. Spinney 17. St. Andrew's 18. St. Mary's 19. St. Michael's 20. St. Peter's 21. Warkton 22. Welland 23. Wicksteed

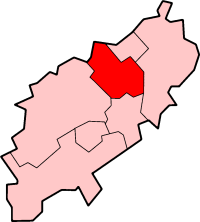
Kettering Borough within Northamptonshire

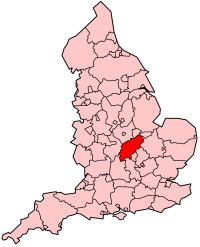
Northamptonshire within England

Elections for Kettering Borough Council, which covers the Borough of Kettering, were held on 1 May 2003 and were won by the Conservatives, gaining overall control from Labour.

== Summary results ==
The overall results, using average ward votes for the total number of votes cast, were as follows:

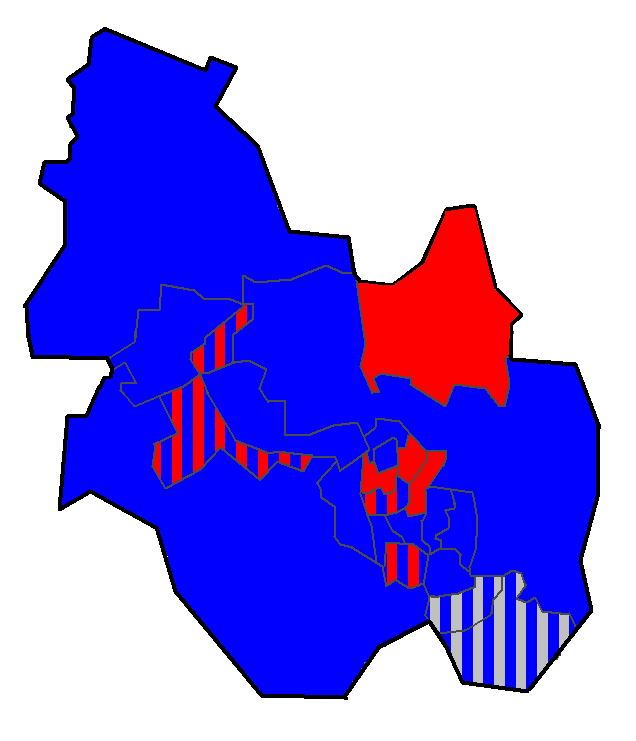
Kettering Borough Council (after 2003 election) (Key: Red = Labour, blue = Conservative, grey = Independent, stripes = mixed ward)

Kettering Borough Council elections 2003: summary results
Party	Candidates	Votes	% votes	Seats	Change
Conservative	45	12,371	56.3	30	+12
Labour	44	8,038	36.6	13	-9
Independent	5	827	3.8	2	-2
Liberal Democrats	8	751	3.4	0	-1
Total	102	21,987		45	
Electorate	66,470				
Turnout	33.1				

(Vote counts shown are ward averages.)

== Council before 2003 elections ==
Before the elections held on 1 May 2003, the composition of Kettering Borough Council was as follows:

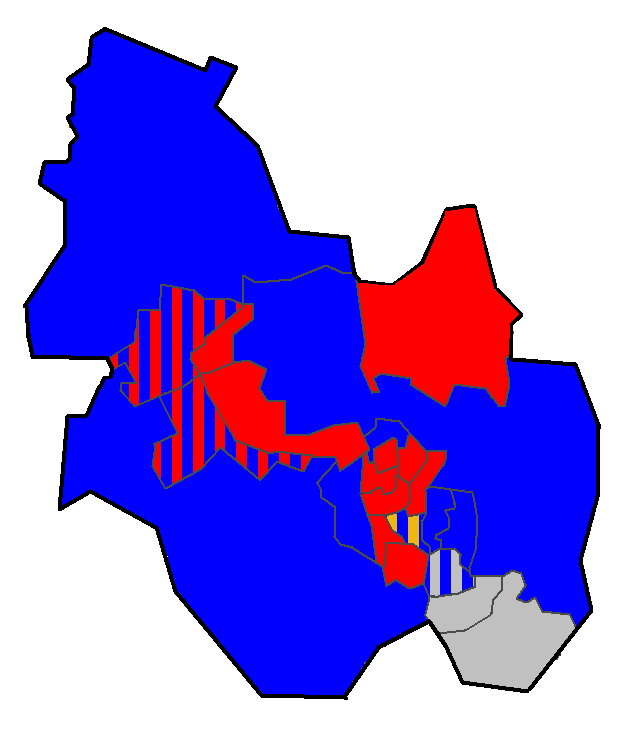
Kettering Borough Council (before 2003 election) (Key: Red = Labour, blue = Conservative, yellow = Liberal Democrat, grey = Independent, stripes = mixed ward)

Composition table (as of April 2003)
Party	Group leader	Seats	% seats	Change (on 1999)
Labour	Richard Tod	23	51.1	+1
Conservative	Terry Freer	16	35.6	-2
Independent	Christopher Groome	5	11.1	+1
Liberal Democrats	John Coleman	1	2.2	0
Total seats		45		

Labour majority of 1

== Ward-by-ward results ==
=== All Saints Ward (2 seats) ===
Kettering Borough Council elections 2003: All Saints Ward
Party	Candidate	Votes	%	±%
Conservative	Greg Titcombe	566	28.6	
Conservative	Christine Smith-Haynes	563	28.5	
Labour	Susan Holmes	451	22.8	
Labour	David Threadgold	398	20.1	

Ward summary
Party	Votes	% votes	Seats	Change
Conservative	565	57.1	2	+2
Labour	425	42.3	0	-2
Total votes cast	989			
Electorate	2,842			
Turnout	34.8%			

(Vote count shown is ward average.)

=== Avondale Ward (2 seats) ===
Kettering Borough Council elections 2003: Avondale Ward
Party	Candidate	Votes	%	±%
Labour	Eddie Brace	554	35.6	
Labour	Paul Corazzo	444	28.5	
Conservative	Kathleen Stallard	243	15.6	
Conservative	Delyse Silverstone	206	13.2	
Independent	Eric Bellamy-Tall	111	7.1	

Ward summary
Party	Votes	% votes	Seats	Change
Labour	499	59.8	2	0
Conservative	225	26.9	0	0
Independent	111	13.3	0	0
Total votes cast	835			
Electorate	3,146			
Turnout	26.5%			

(Vote count shown is ward average.)

=== Barton Ward (2 seats) ===
Kettering Borough Council elections 2003: Barton Ward
Party	Candidate	Votes	%	±%
Conservative	Maurice Bayes	860	34.8	
Conservative	Christopher Lamb	853	34.5	
Labour	Christine McAlinden	391	15.8	
Labour	Margaret Philip	370	15.0	

Ward summary
Party	Votes	% votes	Seats	Change
Conservative	857	69.2	2	0
Labour	381	30.8	0	0
Total votes cast	1,237			
Electorate	3,402			
Turnout	36.4%			

(Vote count shown is ward average.)

=== Brambleside Ward (2 seats) ===
Kettering Borough Council elections 2003: Brambleside Ward
Party	Candidate	Votes	%	±%
Conservative	Bill Parker	722	36.2	
Conservative	Pat Anderson	652	32.7	
Labour	Samuel Smith	312	15.6	
Labour	Archibald Welsh	310	15.5	

Ward summary
Party	Votes	% votes	Seats	Change
Conservative	687	68.8	2	0
Labour	311	31.2	0	0
Total votes cast	998			
Electorate	3,276			
Turnout	30.5%			

(Vote count shown is ward average.)

=== Buccleuch Ward (1 seat) ===
Kettering Borough Council elections 2003: Buccleuch Ward
Party	Candidate	Votes	%	±%
Conservative	Philip Hollobone	466	79.5	
Labour	Margaret Whalley	120	20.5	

Ward summary
Party	Votes	% votes	Seats	Change
Conservative	466	79.5	1	0
Labour	120	20.5	0	0
Total votes cast	586			
Electorate	1,150			
Turnout	51.0%			

(Vote count shown is ward average.)

=== Loatland Ward (2 seats) ===
Kettering Borough Council elections 2003: Loatland Ward
Party	Candidate	Votes	%	±%
Conservative	Belinda Humfrey	835	32.2	
Conservative	Mark Dearing	769	29.6	
Labour	Derek Fox	401	15.4	
Labour	Joanne Watson	387	14.9	
Liberal Democrats	Philip Rice	103	4.0	
Liberal Democrats	Richard Crane	101	3.9	

Ward summary
Party	Votes	% votes	Seats	Change
Conservative	802	61.8	2	+1
Labour	394	30.4	0	-1
Liberal Democrats	102	7.9	0	0
Total votes cast	1,298			
Electorate	3,500			
Turnout	37.1%			

(Vote count shown is ward average.)

=== St Giles Ward (2 seats) ===
Kettering Borough Council elections 2003: St Giles Ward
Party	Candidate	Votes	%	±%
Conservative	Michael Tebbutt	742	28.3	
Labour	David Coe	600	22.9	
Conservative	David Soans	582	22.2	
Labour	Richard Tod	389	14.8	
Liberal Democrats	Stan Freeman	204	7.8	
Liberal Democrats	Alan Window	108	4.1	

Ward summary
Party	Votes	% votes	Seats	Change
Conservative	662	50.4	1	+1
Labour	495	37.7	1	-1
Liberal Democrats	156	11.9	0	0
Total votes cast	1,313			
Electorate	3,022			
Turnout	43.4%			

(Vote count shown is ward average.)

=== Latimer Ward (Burton Latimer) (2 seats) ===
Kettering Borough Council elections 2003: Latimer Ward
Party	Candidate	Votes	%	±%
Independent	Ruth Groome	440	29.6	
Conservative	Ted Evans	326	22.0	
Conservative	Claire Sevier-Burnapp	272	18.3	
Independent	Maureen Jerram	260	17.5	
Labour	Christopher Jack	111	7.5	
Labour	Richard Sheehan	76	5.1	

Ward summary
Party	Votes	% votes	Seats	Change
Independent	350	47.1	1	-1
Conservative	299	40.3	1	+1
Labour	94	12.6	0	0
Total votes cast	743			
Electorate	2,534			
Turnout	29.3%			

(Vote count shown is ward average.)

=== Millbrook Ward (Ise Lodge) (2 seats) ===
Kettering Borough Council elections 2003: Millbrook Ward
Party	Candidate	Votes	%	±%
Conservative	Shirley Lynch	600	40.7	
Conservative	Lloyd Bunday	589	39.9	
Labour	Adrian Perrin	286	19.4	

Ward summary
Party	Votes	% votes	Seats	Change
Conservative	595	67.5	2	0
Labour	286	32.5	0	0
Total votes cast	1,298			
Electorate	3,500			
Turnout	37.1%			

(Vote count shown is ward average.)

=== Piper's Hill Ward (2 seats) ===
Kettering Borough Council elections 2003: Piper's Hill Ward
Party	Candidate	Votes	%	±%
Conservative	Ursula Jones	487	25.4	
Conservative	James Richardson	437	22.8	
Liberal Democrats	John Coleman	391	20.4	
Liberal Democrats	Helen Gatehouse	291	15.2	
Labour	Philip Hales	171	8.9	
Labour	David Joyce	140	7.3	

Ward summary
Party	Votes	% votes	Seats	Change
Conservative	462	48.2	2	+1
Liberal Democrats	341	35.6	0	-1
Labour	156	16.2	0	0
Total votes cast	959			
Electorate	2,392			
Turnout	40.1%			

(Vote count shown is ward average.)

=== Plessy Ward (Burton Latimer) (2 seats) ===
Kettering Borough Council elections 2003: Plessy Ward
Party	Candidate	Votes	%	±%
Conservative	Michelle Evans	447	25.3	
Independent	Christopher Groome	420	23.8	
Conservative	Martin Wightman	371	21.0	
Independent	Derek Zanger	312	17.7	
Labour	David Bishop	125	7.1	
Labour	David Williams	90	5.1	

Ward summary
Party	Votes	% votes	Seats	Change
Conservative	409	46.3	1	+1
Independent	366	41.5	1	-1
Labour	108	12.2	0	0
Total votes cast	883			
Electorate	2,715			
Turnout	32.5%			

(Vote count shown is ward average.)

=== Queen Eleanor Ward (1 seat) ===
Kettering Borough Council elections 2003: Queen Eleanor Ward
Party	Candidate	Votes	%	±%
Labour	John Padwick	437	55.3	
Conservative	Valerie-Lee Bellamy	353	44.7	

Ward summary
Party	Votes	% votes	Seats	Change
Labour	466	79.5	1	0
Conservative	353	44.7	0	0
Total votes cast	790			
Electorate	1,297			
Turnout	60.9%			

(Vote count shown is ward average.)

=== Slade Ward (2 seats) ===
Kettering Borough Council elections 2003: Slade Ward
Party	Candidate	Votes	%	±%
Conservative	Jim Hakewill	903	37.5	
Conservative	Michael Harrison	890	37.0	
Labour	Martin Moloney	323	13.4	
Labour	Sushila Wright	290	12.1	

Ward summary
Party	Votes	% votes	Seats	Change
Conservative	897	74.5	2	0
Labour	307	25.5	0	0
Total votes cast	1,203			
Electorate	3,564			
Turnout	33.8%			

(Vote count shown is ward average.)

=== Spinney Ward (Ise Lodge) (2 seats) ===
Kettering Borough Council elections 2003: Spinney Ward
Party	Candidate	Votes	%	±%
Conservative	Bob Civil	446	33.1	
Conservative	Matthew Lynch	394	29.3	
Liberal Democrats	John Turnbull	157	11.7	
Liberal Democrats	Chris McGlynn	147	10.9	
Labour	Adrian Chambers	109	8.1	
Labour	Alfred Elderton	94	7.0	

Ward summary
Party	Votes	% votes	Seats	Change
Conservative	420	62.4	2	0
Liberal Democrats	152	22.6	0	0
Labour	102	15.1	0	0
Total votes cast	674			
Electorate	3,230			
Turnout	20.9%			

(Vote count shown is ward average.)

=== St. Andrew's Ward (3 seats) ===
Kettering Borough Council elections 2003: St. Andrew's Ward
Party	Candidate	Votes	%	±%
Labour	Jonathan West	598	21.8	
Labour	Stephen King	560	20.4	
Labour	Gil Rennie	550	20.1	
Conservative	Nigel Simmance	349	12.7	
Conservative	Carolyn Maxted	348	12.7	
Conservative	Philip Malin	338	12.3	

Ward summary
Party	Votes	% votes	Seats	Change
Labour	569	62.3	3	0
Conservative	345	37.7	0	0
Total votes cast	914			
Electorate	4,140			
Turnout	22.1%			

(Vote count shown is ward average.)

=== St. Mary's Ward (3 seats) ===
Kettering Borough Council elections 2003: St. Mary's Ward
Party	Candidate	Votes	%	±%
Conservative	James Burton	629	18.5	
Labour	Maggie Don	617	18.2	
Labour	Gina Beale	579	17.0	
Labour	Peter Holmes	555	16.3	
Conservative	Russell Roberts	512	15.1	
Conservative	Kenneth Jack	506	14.9	

Ward summary
Party	Votes	% votes	Seats	Change
Labour	584	51.5	2	-1
Conservative	549	48.5	1	+1
Total votes cast	1,133			
Electorate	4,182			
Turnout	27.1%			

(Vote count shown is ward average.)

=== St. Michael's Ward (2 seats) ===
Kettering Borough Council elections 2003: St. Michael's Ward
Party	Candidate	Votes	%	±%
Conservative	John Henson	707	30.5	
Conservative	Jennifer Henson	677	29.2	
Labour	Brenda McCraith	476	20.5	
Labour	Derek Lee	458	19.8	

Ward summary
Party	Votes	% votes	Seats	Change
Conservative	692	59.7	2	+1
Labour	467	40.3	0	-1
Total votes cast	1,159			
Electorate	2,793			
Turnout	41.5%			

(Vote count shown is ward average.)

=== St. Peter's Ward (2 seats) ===
Kettering Borough Council elections 2003: St. Peter's Ward
Party	Candidate	Votes	%	±%
Conservative	Terry Freer	848	40.0	
Conservative	Mary Malin	802	37.8	
Labour	Ian Watts	238	11.2	
Labour	Shona Scrimshaw	234	11.0	

Ward summary
Party	Votes	% votes	Seats	Change
Conservative	825	77.8	2	0
Labour	236	22.2	0	0
Total votes cast	1,061			
Electorate	3,441			
Turnout	30.8%			

(Vote count shown is ward average.)

=== Rothwell Tresham Ward (2 seats) ===
Kettering Borough Council elections 2003: Rothwell Tresham Ward
Party	Candidate	Votes	%	±%
Conservative	Alan Pote	549	28.0	
Labour	David Whyte	493	25.2	
Conservative	Margaret Talbot	466	23.8	
Labour	Peter Weston	452	23.1	

Ward summary
Party	Votes	% votes	Seats	Change
Conservative	508	51.8	1	0
Labour	473	48.2	1	0
Total votes cast	980			
Electorate	2,792			
Turnout	35.1%			

(Vote count shown is ward average.)

=== Rothwell Trinity Ward (2 seats) ===
Kettering Borough Council elections 2003: Rothwell Trinity Ward
Party	Candidate	Votes	%	±%
Conservative	Cedwien Brown	541	26.1	
Conservative	Alan Whitlam	531	25.6	
Labour	Mark Hughes	507	24.4	
Labour	Glenda Weston	495	23.9	

Ward summary
Party	Votes	% votes	Seats	Change
Conservative	536	51.7	2	+2
Labour	501	48.3	0	-2
Total votes cast	1,037			
Electorate	2,829			
Turnout	36.7%			

(Vote count shown is ward average.)

=== Warkton Ward (2 seats) ===
Kettering Borough Council elections 2003: Warkton Ward
Party	Candidate	Votes	%	±%
Labour	Linda Adams	474	35.2	
Labour	Eileen Hales	456	33.9	
Conservative	Beverley Howell	216	16.1	
Conservative	Victoria Lamb	199	14.8	

Ward summary
Party	Votes	% votes	Seats	Change
Labour	465	69.1	2	0
Conservative	208	30.9	0	0
Total votes cast	673			
Electorate	2,615			
Turnout	25.7%			

(Vote count shown is ward average.)

=== Welland Ward (1 seat) ===
Kettering Borough Council elections 2003: Welland Ward
Party	Candidate	Votes	%	±%
Conservative	Alison Wiley	592	72.7	
Labour	Susan Buchanan	222	27.3	

Ward summary
Party	Votes	% votes	Seats	Change
Conservative	592	72.7	1	0
Labour	222	27.3	0	0
Total votes cast	814			
Electorate	1,834			
Turnout	44.4%			

(Vote count shown is ward average.)

=== Wicksteed Ward (2 seats) ===
Kettering Borough Council elections 2003: Wicksteed Ward
Party	Candidate	Votes	%	±%
Conservative	Derek Darby	427	25.7	
Labour	Alex Gordon	426	25.6	
Conservative	Paul Marks	413	24.9	
Labour	Roy Mayhew	395	23.8	

Ward summary
Party	Votes	% votes	Seats	Change
Conservative	420	50.6	1	+1
Labour	411	49.4	1	-1
Total votes cast	831			
Electorate	2,715			
Turnout	30.6%			

(Vote count shown is ward average.)

== Borough council by-elections (since May 2003) ==
=== Latimer Ward (Burton Latimer) by-election: 28 July 2005 ===
- Cause: Death of Cllr. Ted Evans
- Holding party: Conservative

Kettering Borough Council by-election, Latimer Ward: 28 July 2005
Party	Candidate	Votes	%	±%
Conservative	Pat Evans	278	45.6	+5.3
Labour	David Bishop	152	24.9	+12.3
Independent	Maureen Jerram	133	21.8	−25.3
Liberal Democrats	Stuart Simons	47	7.7	+7.7
Majority		126	20.7	+11.7
Turnout		610	24.6	−4.7
Conservative hold		Swing	-3.5	

Electorate: 2498

=== Wicksteed Ward by-election: 6 October 2005 ===
- Cause: Resignation of Cllr. Derek Darby
- Holding party: Conservative

Kettering Borough Council by-election, Wicksteed Ward: 6 October 2005
Party	Candidate	Votes	%	±%
Labour	Lynsey Tod	464	49.7	+0.3
Conservative	Scott Edwards	374	40.0	−9.4
Liberal Democrats	Chris McGlynn	96	10.3	+10.3
Majority		90	9.7	N/A
Turnout		934	35.4	+4.8
Labour gain from Conservative		Swing	+5.4%	

Electorate: 2638

=== St. Mary's Ward by-election: 17 November 2005 ===
- Cause: Resignation of Cllr. Gina Beale
- Holding party: Labour

Kettering Borough Council by-election, St. Mary's Ward, 17 November 2005
Party	Candidate	Votes	%	±%
Labour	Shona Scrimshaw	674	60.9	+9.4
Conservative	Kathleen Stallard	362	32.7	−15.8
Liberal Democrats	Alan Window	71	6.4	+6.4
Majority		312	28.1	+22.3
Turnout		1007	27.7	+0.6
Labour hold		Swing	+12.6%	

Electorate: 4011

== See also ==
- Kettering Borough Council
- Kettering (UK Parliament constituency)
