= Wicksteed =

Wicksteed may refer to:

== People ==
- Alexander Wicksteed, English traveller and writer
- Charles Wicksteed (1810–1885), Unitarian minister, part of the tradition of English Dissenters
- Charles Wicksteed (1847–1931), British engineer, businessman, and entrepreneur
- Connie Wicksteed or Habeas Corpus (play), stage comedy in two acts by the English author Alan Bennett
- Philip Wicksteed (1844–1927), known primarily as an economist
- Thomas Wicksteed (1806–1871), notable English civil engineer of the 19th century

== Associated with Kettering ==
- Wicksteed Park, amusement park in Kettering, Northamptonshire, England
- St. Michael's & Wicksteed (Kettering BC Ward), a ward of Kettering Borough Council, created by boundary changes in 2007
- Wicksteed (ward), two-member ward within Kettering Borough Council

== See also ==
- Wicked (disambiguation)
- Wickstead, a surname
