= Wicksteed (ward) =

Electoral ward in Kettering, Northamptonshire, England

Wicksteed Ward: (Kettering Borough Council)

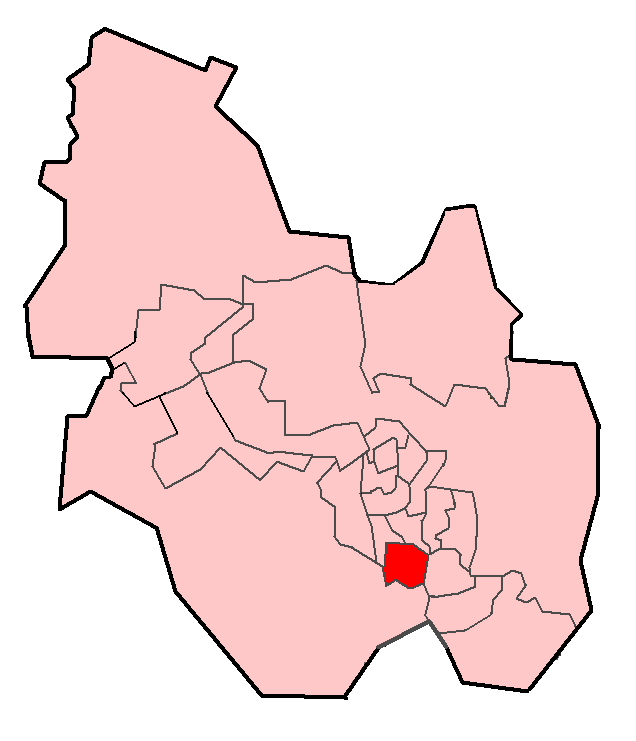
Wicksteed within Kettering Borough

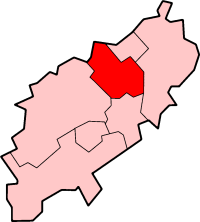
Kettering Borough within Northamptonshire

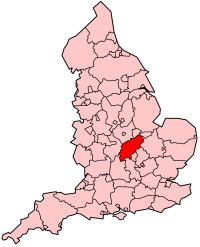
Northamptonshire within England

Wicksteed was a former ward within Borough of Kettering (Northamptonshire, England, UK) from 1974 until 2021.

The two-seat ward was traditionally regarded as a Labour safe seat, owing to the presence of the Highfield Road Council Estate. It later became a marginal seat between Labour and the Conservatives in the 2003 Borough Council elections. After the resignation of the sole Conservative councillor in the autumn of 2005, the seat was recaptured by the Labour Party in a by-election.

Wicksteed was merged with another ward and became the three-seat St Michaels & Wicksteed ward in 2007. In the 2007 Kettering Borough Council election, all three seats went to Conservative candidates.

Northamptonshire County Council became insolvent in March 2018 and was abolished. All of its seven district councils were then dissolved, including the Borough of Kettering. Northamptonshire was further reorganized as part of the broader 2019–2023 structural changes to local government in England. Kettering fell under the unitary authority of a new North Northamptonshire Council as of 1 April 2021, and new elections took place in May 2021 within that structure.

Wicksteed has since been a one-seat ward within the current Kettering Town Council.

== Councillors before 2007 merger ==
Wicksteed Ward by-election: 6 October 2005

- Cllr. Lynsey Tod (Labour)

Replacing Cllr. Derek Darby (Conservative)

Kettering Borough Council elections 2003

- Cllr. Derek Darby (Conservative)
- Cllr. Alex Gordon (Labour)

Kettering Borough Council elections 1999

- Cllr. Alex Gordon (Labour)
- Cllr. Roy Mayhew (Labour)

== Election results ==
=== Wicksteed Ward by-election: 6 October 2005 ===
- Cause: Resignation of Cllr. Derek Darby
- Holding party: Conservative

Kettering Borough Council by-election, Wicksteed Ward: 6 October 2005
Party	Candidate	Votes	%	±%
Labour	Lynsey Tod	464	49.7	+0.3
Conservative	Scott Edwards	374	40.0	−9.4
Liberal Democrats	Chris McGlynn	96	10.3	+10.3
Majority		90	9.6	
Turnout		934	35.4	+4.8
Labour gain from Conservative		Swing	+5.4	

Electorate: 2638

=== Kettering Borough Council elections 2003 ===
Kettering Borough Council elections 2003: Wicksteed Ward
Party	Candidate	Votes	%	±%
Conservative	Derek Darby	427	25.7	
Labour	Alex Gordon	426	25.6	
Conservative	Paul Marks	413	24.9	
Labour	Roy Mayhew	395	23.8	

Ward summary
Party	Votes	% votes	Seats	Change
Conservative	420	50.6	1	+1
Labour	411	49.4	1	-1
Total votes cast	831			
Electorate	2,715			
Turnout	30.6%			

(Vote count shown is ward average.)

== See also ==
- Kettering
- Kettering Borough Council
