= 2007 Kettering Borough Council election =

2007 UK local government election

- 3 May 2007

All 36 seats in the Kettering Borough Council 19 seats needed for a majority
	First party	Second party
Party	Conservative	Labour
Last election	30	13
Seats won	28	6
Seat change	▼2	▼7
Popular vote	14,761	9,582
- Map showing the results of the 2007 Kettering Borough Council elections
Council control before election
Conservative
Council control after election
Conservative

Elections to Kettering Borough Council were held on 3 May 2007. The whole council was up for election, with boundary changes since the last election in 2003 reducing the number of seats by nine. The Conservative Party retained overall control of the council.

== Candidates and election issues ==
Both the Conservative and Labour parties put up candidates in all wards. There were also five Liberal Democrat, four Independent and one Green Party candidates.

Major elections issues included refuse collection, recycling and the location of the council offices.

== Summary results ==
Kettering Borough Council election, 3 May 2007: summary results	Con	Lab	Ind	LD	Grn	Total	Electorate	Turnout
Total votes (ward average votes, turnout adjusted)	14,761 55%	9,582 36%	1,455 5%	703 3%	414 2%	26,914	67,995	39.6%
Total seats	28 -1	6 -8	2 +/-	0 +/-	0 +/-	36 -9		

== Ward results ==
Kettering Borough Council election 2007: ward results
Ward	2003 seats (notional)	2007 result	Detailed result
All Saints (3 seats)	Lab	Con	results
All Saints (3 seats)	Lab	Con	results
All Saints (3 seats)	Con	Lab	results
Avondale Grange (2 seats)	Lab	Lab	results
Avondale Grange (2 seats)	Lab	Lab	results
Barton (2 seats)	Con	Con	results
Barton (2 seats)	Con	Con	results
Brambleside (2 seats)	Con	Con	results
Brambleside (2 seats)	Con	Con	results
Burton Latimer (3 seats)	Con	Con	results
Burton Latimer (3 seats)	Con	Ind	results
Burton Latimer (3 seats)	Ind	Ind	results
Desborough Loatland (2 seats)	Con	Con	results
Desborough Loatland (2 seats)	Con	Con	results
Desborough St. Giles (2 seats)	Con	Con	results
Desborough St. Giles (2 seats)	Con	Con	results
Ise Lodge (3 seats)	Con	Con	results
Ise Lodge (3 seats)	Con	Con	results
Ise Lodge (3 seats)	Con	Con	results
Northfield (1 seat)	Lab	Lab	results
Piper's Hill (2 seats)	Con	Con	results
Piper's Hill (2 seats)	Con	Con	results
Queen Eleanor & Buccleuch (1 seat)	Con	Con	results
Rothwell (3 seats)	Con	Con	results
Rothwell (3 seats)	Con	Con	results
Rothwell (3 seats)	Con	Con	results
Slade (2 seats)	Con	Con	results
Slade (2 seats)	Con	Con	results
St. Michael's & Wicksteed (3 seats)	Con	Con	results
St. Michael's & Wicksteed (3 seats)	Con	Con	results
St. Michael's & Wicksteed (3 seats)	Con	Con	results
St. Peter's (2 seats)	Con	Con	results
St. Peter's (2 seats)	Con	Con	results
Welland (1 seat)	Con	Con	results
William Knibb (2 seats)	Lab	Lab	results
William Knibb (2 seats)	Con	Lab	results

== See also ==
- Kettering local elections
- Kettering town
