= Piper's Hill (ward) =

Ward in Kettering Borough Council, England

Piper's Hill Ward (Kettering Borough Council)

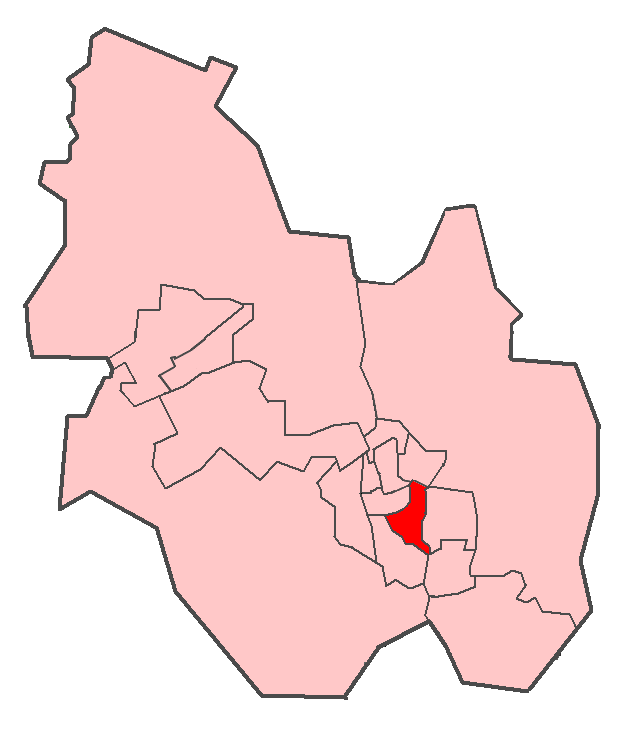
Piper's Hill within Kettering Borough

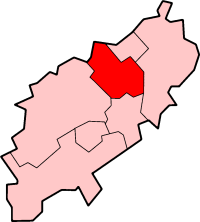
Kettering Borough within Northamptonshire

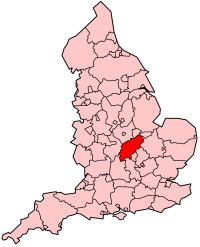
Northamptonshire within England

Piper's Hill Ward is a two-member ward within Kettering Borough Council which is statistically regarded as a marginal ward between Liberal Democrats and the Conservatives. The ward was last fought at borough council level in the 2015 local council elections, in which one seat was won by the Conservatives and one seat was won by Labour.

The current councillors are Cllr. Duncan Bain and Cllr. Anne Lee.

== Councillors ==
Kettering Borough Council elections 2015

- Duncan Bain (Conservative)
- Anne Lee (Labour Party (UK))

Kettering Borough Council elections 2007

- Duncan Bain (Conservative)
- Philip Hollobone MP (Conservative)

Kettering Borough Council elections 2003

- Ursula Jones (Conservative)
- Jamie Richardson (Conservative)

Kettering Borough Council elections 1999

- John Coleman (Liberal Democrat) – served as mayor from 2000 to 2001.
- Fred Brown (Conservative)

== Current ward boundaries (2007–) ==
=== Kettering Borough Council elections 2007 ===
- At the 2007 elections, Piper's Hill ward was enlarged with part of the former Warkton ward, a Labour-held ward.

Piper's Hill (2 seats)
| Party | Candidate | Votes | % | ±% |
|---|---|---|---|---|
| Conservative | Philip Hollobone (E) | 836 | 25.7 | |
| Conservative | Duncan Bain (E) | 740 | 22.7 | |
| Labour | Eileen Hales | 461 | 14.2 | |
| Liberal Democrats | John Coleman | 458 | 14.1 | |
| Labour | Eddie Brace | 457 | 14.0 | |
| Liberal Democrats | Philip Sharman | 301 | 9.3 | |
| Turnout | | 1,702 | 42.4 | |

== Historic ward boundaries (1999–2007) ==
=== Kettering Borough Council elections 2003 ===
Kettering Borough Council elections 2003: Piper's Hill Ward
| Party | Candidate | Votes | % | ±% |
|---|---|---|---|---|
| Conservative | Ursula Jones (E) | 487 | 25.4 | +7.6 |
| Conservative | Jamie Richardson (E) | 437 | 22.8 | +6.6 |
| Liberal Democrats | John Coleman | 391 | 20.4 | −0.7 |
| Liberal Democrats | Helen Gatehouse | 291 | 15.2 | −2.4 |
| Labour | Philip Hales | 171 | 8.9 | −5.6 |
| Labour | David Joyce | 140 | 7.3 | −5.5 |

Ward summary
| Party | Votes | % votes | % change | Seats | Change |
|---|---|---|---|---|---|
| Conservative | 462 | 48.2 | +14.2 | 2 | +1 |
| Liberal Democrats | 341 | 35.6 | -3.1 | 0 | -1 |
| Labour | 156 | 16.2 | -11.1 | 0 | 0 |
| Total votes cast | 959 | | | | |
| Electorate | 2,392 | | | | |
| Turnout | 40.1% | | | | |

(Vote count shown is ward average.)

=== Kettering Borough Council elections 1999 ===
Kettering Borough Council elections 1999: Piper's Hill Ward
| Party | Candidate | Votes | % | ±% |
|---|---|---|---|---|
| Liberal Democrats | John Coleman (E) | 353 | 21.0 | |
| Conservative | Fred Brown (E) | 299 | 17.8 | |
| Liberal Democrats | Lilian Coleman | 295 | 17.6 | |
| Conservative | Mark Ingram | 272 | 16.2 | |
| Labour | Linda Adams | 243 | 14.5 | |
| Labour | Sushila Wright | 215 | 12.8 | |

Ward summary
| Party | Votes | % Votes | Seats | Change |
|---|---|---|---|---|
| Liberal Democrats | 324 | 38.6 | 1 | 0 |
| Conservative | 286 | 34.0 | 1 | +1 |
| Labour | 229 | 27.3 | 0 | -1 |
| Total votes cast | 839 | | | |
| Electorate | | | | |
| Turnout | | | | |

(Vote count shown is ward average.)

== See also ==
- Kettering
- Kettering Borough Council
