= All Saints (ward) =

Electoral ward in Kettering, England

All Saints Ward (Kettering Borough Council)

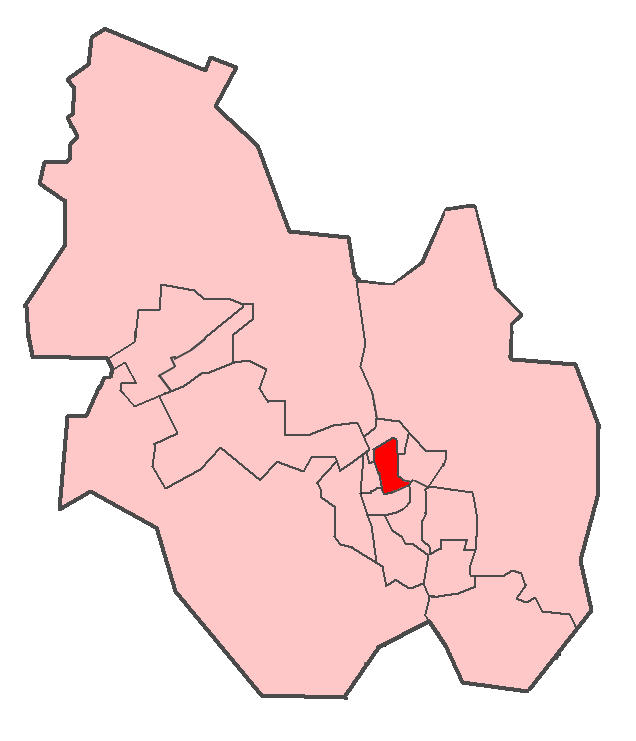
All Saints within Kettering Borough

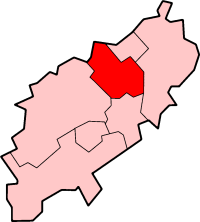
Kettering Borough within Northamptonshire

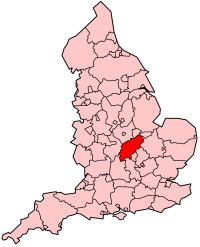
Northamptonshire within England

All Saints Ward is a three-member ward within Kettering Borough Council and is commonly regarded as a marginal ward between Conservatives and Labour. The ward was last fought at borough council level in the 2015 local council elections. Three Conservative councillors were elected: Cllr Lesley Thurland, Cllr James Burton, and Cllr Greg Titcombe.

== Councillors ==
Kettering Borough Council elections 2011

- Michael Brown (Conservative)
- Michelle George (Labour)
- Jonathan West (Labour)

=== Kettering Borough Council elections 2011 ===
All Saints (3 seats)
| Party | Candidate | Votes | % | ±% |
|---|---|---|---|---|
| Conservative | Michael Brown (E) | 1019 | | |
| Labour | Michelle George (E) | 1005 | | |
| Labour | Jonathan West (E) | 1000 | | |
| Conservative | Greg Titcombe | 954 | | |
| Labour | Steve King | 898 | | |
| Conservative | Chris Smith-Haynes | 876 | | |
| Turnout | | | 38.1 | |

== Councillors ==
Kettering Borough Council elections 2007

- Chris Smith-Haynes (Conservative)
- Greg Titcombe (Conservative)
- Jonathan West (Labour)

Kettering Borough Council elections 2003

- Greg Titcombe (Conservative)
- Chris Smith-Haynes (Conservative)

Kettering Borough Council elections 1999

- Sue Holmes (Labour) - served as mayor from 2002 to 2003
- David Threadgold (Labour)

== Current ward boundaries (2007-) ==
- Note: due to boundary changes, vote changes listed below are based on notional results.

=== Kettering Borough Council elections 2007 ===
All Saints (3 seats)
| Party | Candidate | Votes | % | ±% |
|---|---|---|---|---|
| Conservative | Chris Smith-Haynes (E) | 905 | | |
| Conservative | Greg Titcombe (E) | 883 | | |
| Labour | Jonathan West (E) | 859 | | |
| Labour | Susan Holmes | 838 | | |
| Conservative | Stephen Castens | 726 | | |
| Labour | Steve King | 705 | | |
| Green | Alan Heath | 426 | | |
| Turnout | | 2,012 | 35.0 | |

== Historic ward boundaries (1999-2007) ==
=== Kettering Borough Council elections 2003 ===
Kettering Borough Council elections 2003: All Saints Ward
| Party | Candidate | Votes | % | ±% |
|---|---|---|---|---|
| Conservative | Greg Titcombe | 566 | 28.6 | |
| Conservative | Chris Smith-Haynes | 563 | 28.5 | |
| Labour | Sue Holmes | 451 | 22.8 | |
| Labour | David Threadgold | 398 | 20.1 | |

Ward summary
| Party | Votes | % votes | Seats | Change |
|---|---|---|---|---|
| Conservative | 565 | 57.1 | 2 | +2 |
| Labour | 425 | 42.3 | 0 | -2 |
| Total votes cast | 989 | | | |
| Electorate | 2,842 | | | |
| Turnout | 34.8% | | | |

(Vote count shown is ward average.)

== See also ==
- Kettering
- Kettering Borough Council
