= Desborough Loatland =

Electoral ward in Kettering, Northamptonshire, England

Desborough Loatland Ward (Kettering Borough Council)

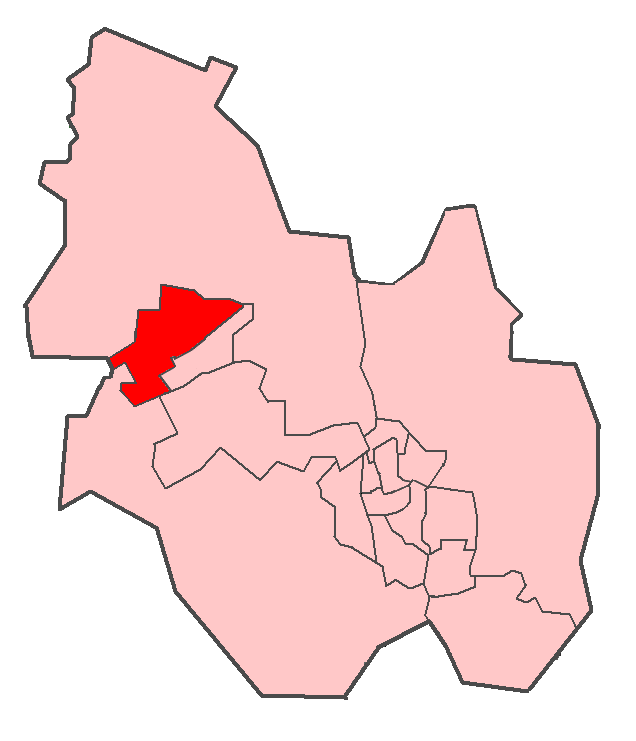
Desborough Loatland within Kettering Borough

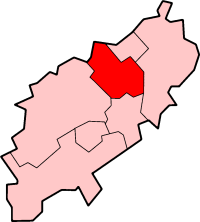
Kettering Borough within Northamptonshire

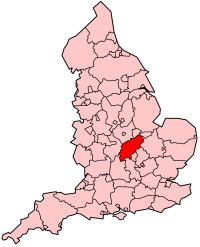
Northamptonshire within England

Desborough Loatland Ward is a two-member ward within Kettering Borough Council, representing part of Desborough. Prior to 2007 boundary changes, this ward was formerly known as Loatland.

The ward was last fought at borough council level in the 2007 local council elections, in which both seats were won by the Conservatives.

The current mayor and councillor is Bill McElhinney.

== Councillors ==
Kettering Borough Council elections 2007

- Cllr. Mark Dearing (Conservative)
- Cllr. June Derbyshire (Conservative)

Kettering Borough Council elections 2003

- Cllr. Belinda Humfrey (Conservative)
- Cllr. Mark Dearing (Conservative)

Kettering Borough Council elections 1999

- Cllr. Belinda Humfrey (Conservative)
- Cllr. Derek Fox (Labour)

Desborough Loatland by-election: 6 November 1997

- Unknown Conservative councillor (replacing an unknown Labour councillor)

== Current ward boundaries (2007-) ==
=== Kettering Borough Council elections 2007 ===
Desborough Loatland (2)
Party	Candidate	Votes	%	±%
Conservative	Mark Dearing (E)	837		
Conservative	June Derbyshire (E)	813		
Labour	Joanne Watson	450		
Labour	Michael Payne	427		
Turnout		1,309	42.0	

== Former ward boundaries (1999-2007) ==
=== Kettering Borough Council elections 2003 ===
Kettering Borough Council elections 2003: Desborough Loatland Ward
Party	Candidate	Votes	%	±%
Conservative	Belinda Humfrey (E)	835	31.8	+3.1
Conservative	Mark Dearing (E)	769	29.3	+4.8
Labour	Derek Fox	401	15.3	−10.4
Labour	Joanne Watson	387	14.7	−8.6
Liberal Democrats	Philip Rice	103	3.9	+3.9
Liberal Democrats	Richard Crane	101	3.8	+3.8

Ward summary
Party	Votes	% votes	% Change	Seats	Change
Conservative	802	61.8	+13.8	2	+1
Labour	394	30.4	-21.7	0	-1
Liberal Democrats	102	7.9	+7.9	0	0
Total votes cast	1,298				
Electorate	3,500				
Turnout	37.1%				

(Vote count shown is ward average.)

=== Kettering Borough Council elections 1999 ===
This seat may have been affected by boundary changes at this election.

Kettering Borough Council elections 1999: Desborough Loatland Ward
Party	Candidate	Votes	%	±%
Conservative	Belinda Humfrey (E)	673	28.7	
Labour	Derek Fox (E)	603	25.7	
Conservative	Carol-Anne Trivett	575	24.5	
Labour	David Larmour	547	16.2	

Ward summary
Party	Votes	% Votes	Seats	Change
Conservative	624	52.0	1	+1
Labour	575	48.0	1	-1
Total votes cast	1199			
Electorate				
Turnout				

(Vote count shown is ward average)

=== Kettering Borough Council by-election: 6 November 1997 ===
- Cause: Unknown
- Holding Party: Conservative

Kettering Borough Council by-election, Desborough Loatland ward: 6 November 1997
Party	Candidate	Votes	%	±%
Conservative		338	43.4	+22.8
Labour		331	41.5	−14.6
Liberal Democrats		129	16.2	−7.2
Majority		7	1.9	
Turnout		798	27.8	
Conservative gain from Labour		Swing		

== See also ==
- Kettering
- Kettering Borough Council
