= Brambleside =

Electoral ward

Brambleside Ward (Kettering Borough Council)

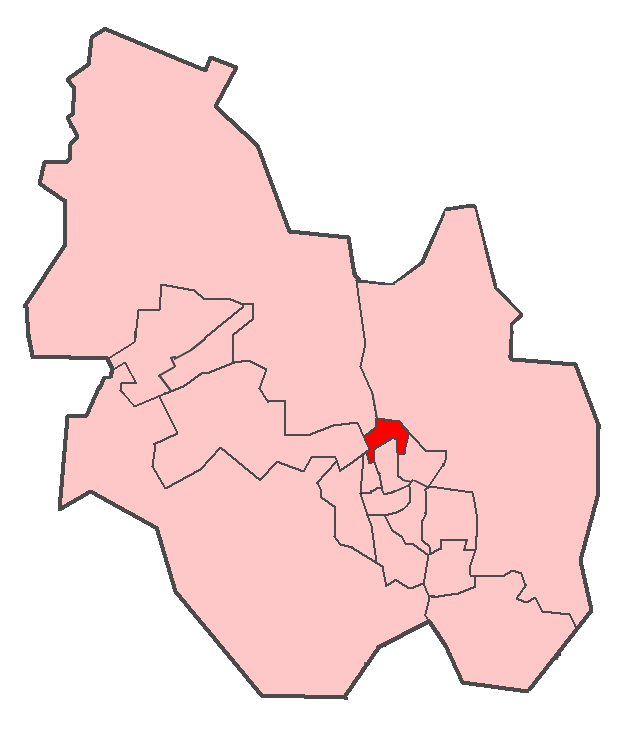
Brambleside within Kettering Borough

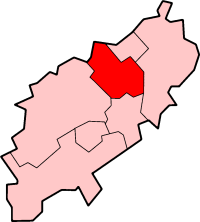
Kettering Borough within Northamptonshire

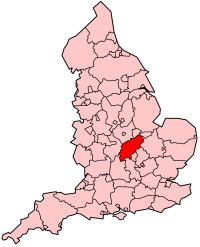
Northamptonshire within England, UK

Brambleside Ward is a two-member ward within Kettering Borough Council, Northamptonshire, East Midlands, in England.

The ward was last fought at borough council level in the Kettering Council election, 2015, in which both seats were won by the Conservatives.

The current councillors are Cllr. Michael Brown and Cllr. Ash Davies.

Brambleside Ward was created in 1999 following a boundary review. The ward was previously part of Kingsley Ward.

== Councillors ==
Kettering Borough Council election, 2015

- Michael Brown (Conservative)
- Ash Davies (Conservative)

Kettering Borough Council election, 2011

- Maurice Bayes (Conservative)
- Paul Marks (Conservative)

Kettering Borough Council election, 2007

- Maurice Bayes (Conservative)
- Paul Marks (Conservative)

Kettering Borough Council election, 2003

- Bill Parker (Conservative)
- Pat Anderson (Conservative)

Kettering Borough Council election, 1999

- Bill Parker (Conservative)
- Carolyn Maxted (Conservative)

== Current ward boundaries (2007–present) ==
=== Kettering Town Council 2021 ===
Barmbleside (2 seats)
Party	Candidate	Votes	%	±%
Green	Jamie Dell	1,058		
Green	Kieron Farlow	809		
Conservative	Max Davies	645		
Conservative	Lesley Thrulands	556		
Independent	Derek Hill	104		

=== Kettering Borough Council elections 2015 ===
Brambleside (2 seats)
Party	Candidate	Votes	%	±%
Conservative	Michael Brown (E)	1,314	29.9%	
Conservative	Ash Davies (E)	1,155	26.3%	
Labour	Adrian Chambers	631	14.3%	
UKIP	Lee Ramsden	537	12.2%	
Labour	Archie Welsh	448	10.2%	
Green	Mara Lane	200	4.5%	
English Democrat	Derek Hilling	114	2.6%	
Turnout		2,586	70.0	

=== Kettering Borough Council elections 2011 ===
Brambleside (2 seats)
Party	Candidate	Votes	%	±%
Conservative	Maurice Bayes (E)	723		
Conservative	Paul Marks (E)	660		
Labour	Adrian Chambers	598		
Labour	Susan Holmes	435		
English Democrat	Derek Hilling	349		
Turnout		1,617	44.4	

=== Kettering Borough Council elections 2007 ===
- Note: due to boundary changes, vote changes listed below are based on notional results.

Brambleside (2 seats)
Party	Candidate	Votes	%	±%
Conservative	Maurice Bayes (E)	660		
Conservative	Paul Marks (E)	652		
Labour	Adrian Chambers	422		
Labour	Ellie Manns	388		
Independent	Derek Hilling	323		
Turnout		1,331	37.5	

== Previous ward boundaries (1999–2007) ==
=== Kettering Borough Council elections 2003 ===
Kettering Borough Council elections 2003: Brambleside Ward
Party	Candidate	Votes	%	±%
Conservative	Bill Parker (E)	722	36.2	
Conservative	Pat Anderson (E)	652	32.7	
Labour	Samuel Smith	312	15.6	
Labour	Archibald Welsh	310	15.5	

Ward summary
Party	Votes	% votes	Seats	Change
Conservative	687	68.8	2	0
Labour	311	31.2	0	0
Total votes cast	998			
Electorate	3,276			
Turnout	30.5%			

(Vote count shown is ward average.)

=== Kettering Borough Council elections 1999 ===
Kettering Borough Council elections 1999: Brambleside Ward
Party	Candidate	Votes	%	±%
Conservative	Bill Parker (E)	576		
Conservative	Carolyn Maxted (E)	543		
Labour	David Threadgold	384		
Labour	I. White	348		

Ward summary
Party	Votes	% votes	Seats	Change
Conservative			2	0
Labour			0	0
Total votes cast				
Electorate	2899			
Turnout	47.5			

(Vote count shown is ward average.)

== See also ==
- Kettering
- Kettering Borough Council
