= Wickstead =

Wickstead is a surname. Notable people with the surname include:

- Archibald Wickstead (1884–1966), English cricketer
- Emilia Wickstead (born 1983), New Zealand-born fashion designer in London
- Jemima Kindersley (née Jemima Wickstead; 1741–1809), English travel writer

== See also ==
- Wicksteed (disambiguation)
