= Welland (ward) =

Former electoral ward in the UK

Welland (Kettering Borough Council)

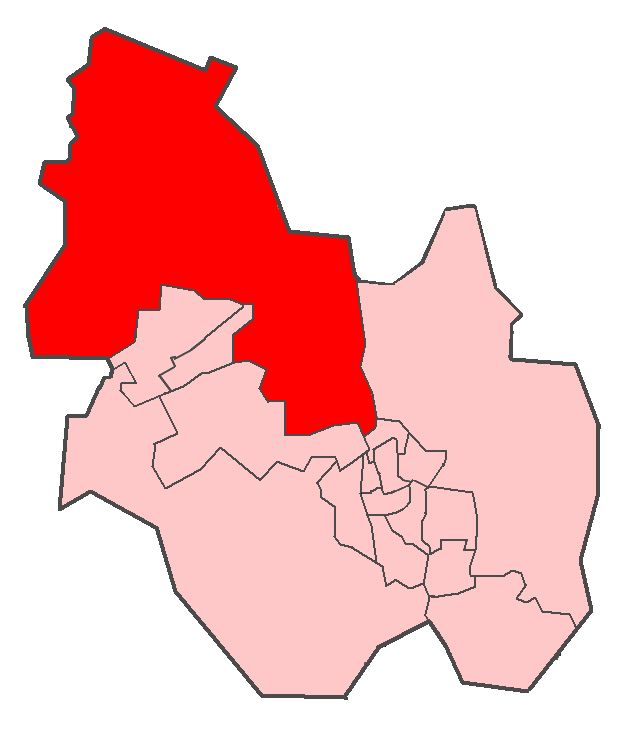
Welland Ward within Kettering Borough

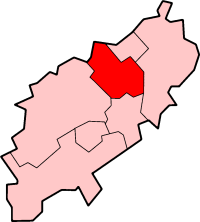
Kettering Borough within Northamptonshire

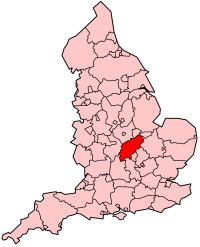
Northamptonshire within England

Welland Ward, was a 1-member ward representing an area in the North-west of the Kettering Borough Council area. In 2021, Kettering Borough Council was abolished, and replaced by the North Northamptonshire Unitary authority.

== Councillors ==
Kettering Borough Council elections 2007

- Alison Wiley (Conservative)

Kettering Borough Council elections 2011

- Alison Wiley (Conservative)

Kettering Borough Council by-elections 2013

- David Howes (Conservative)

Kettering Borough Council elections 2015

- David Howes (Conservative)

== 2007–2021 ward boundaries ==
=== Kettering Borough Council elections 2007 ===
- Note: due to boundary changes, vote changes listed below are based on notional results.

Welland (1 seat)
Party	Candidate	Votes	%	±%
Conservative	Alison Wiley (E)	775	74.6	+0.7
Labour	Peter Weston	264	25.4	−0.7
Turnout		1,050	47.8	

== 1999–2007 ward boundaries ==
=== Kettering Borough Council elections 2003 ===
Kettering Borough Council elections 2003: Welland Ward
Party	Candidate	Votes	%	±%
Conservative	Alison Wiley	592	72.7	
Labour	Susan Buchanan	222	27.3	

Ward summary
Party	Votes	% votes	Seats	Change
Conservative	592	72.7	1	0
Labour	222	27.3	0	0
Total votes cast	814			
Electorate	1,834			
Turnout	44.4%			

(Vote count shown is ward average.)

== See also ==
- Kettering
- North Northamptonshire
