= Desborough St Giles =

Desborough St Giles Ward (Kettering Borough Council)

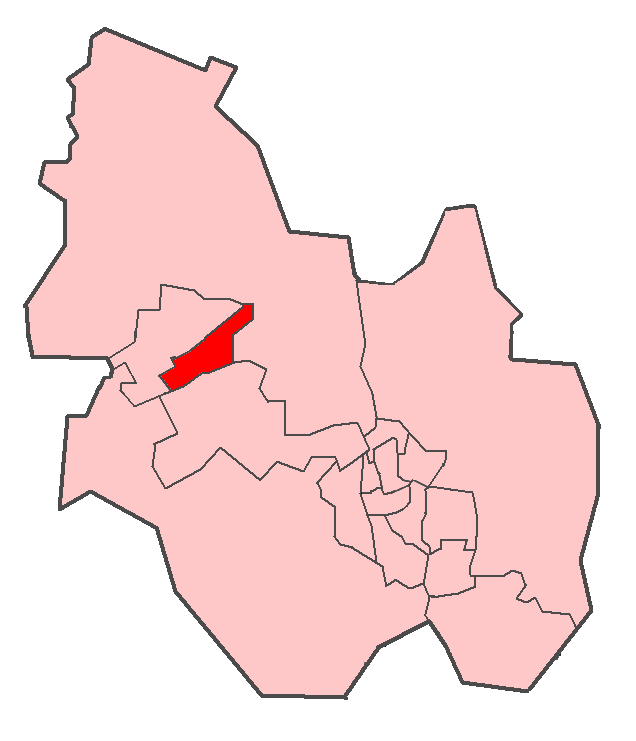
Desborough St Giles within Kettering Borough

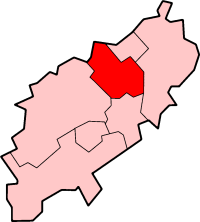
Kettering Borough within Northamptonshire

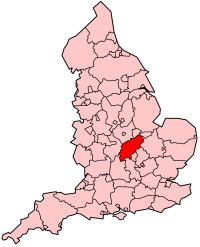
Northamptonshire within England

Desborough St Giles, representing part of the town of Desborough, is a two-member ward within Kettering Borough Council, in the north of Desborough, Northamptonshire. The ward was last fought at borough council level in the 2007 local council elections, in which both seats were won by the Conservatives.

The ward was, before May 2007, known as simply St. Giles, but for clarity and continuity, this article refers to the ward as "Desborough St. Giles".

The current councillors are Cllr. Mike Tebbutt and Cllr. Dave Soans.

== Councillors ==
Kettering Borough Council elections 2007

- Mike Tebbutt (Conservative)
- Dave Soans (Conservative)

Kettering Borough Council elections 2003

- David Coe (Labour)
- Mike Tebbutt (Conservative)

Kettering Borough Council elections 1999

- David Coe (Labour)
- Richard Tod (Labour)

== Current ward boundaries (2007–) ==
=== Kettering Borough Council elections 2007 ===
- Note: due to boundary changes, vote changes listed below are based on notional results.

Desborough St Giles (2 seats)
Party	Candidate	Votes	%	±%
Conservative	Mike Tebbutt (E)	1152		
Conservative	Dave Soans (E)	903		
Labour	David Coe	881		
Labour	Mary Payne	705		
Turnout		1,905	48.7	

== Historic ward boundaries (1999–2007) ==
=== Kettering Borough Council elections 2003 ===
Kettering Borough Council elections 2003: St Giles Ward
Party	Candidate	Votes	%	±%
Conservative	Mike Tebbutt	742	28.3	+8.7
Labour	David Coe	600	22.9	−6.0
Conservative	David Soans	582	22.2	+3.0
Labour	Richard Tod	389	14.8	−7.4
Liberal Democrats	Stan Freeman	204	7.8	+1.8
Liberal Democrats	Alan Window	108	4.1	−0.1

Ward summary
Party	Votes	% votes	% change	Seats	Change
Conservative	662	50.4%	+11.7	1	+1
Labour	495	37.7	-13.4	1	-1
Liberal Democrats	156	11.9	+1.7	0	0
Total votes cast	1,313				
Electorate	3,022				
Turnout	43.4%				

(Vote count shown is ward average.)

=== Kettering Borough Council elections 1999 ===
This seat may have been affected by boundary changes at this election.

Kettering Borough Council elections 1999: St Giles Ward
Party	Candidate	Votes	%	±%
Labour	David Coe	677	28.9	
Labour	Richard Tod	522	22.3	
Conservative	Pamela Tomlinson	459	19.6	
Conservative	Scott Edwards	449	19.1	
Liberal Democrats	Philip Rice	141	6.0	
Liberal Democrats	Alan Window	98	4.2	

Ward summary
Party	Votes	% votes	Seats	Change
Labour	600	51.1	2	
Conservative	454	38.7	0	
Liberal Democrats	120	10.2	0	0
Total votes cast	1173			
Electorate				
Turnout				

(Vote count shown is ward average.)

== See also ==
- Desborough
- Kettering Borough Council
