= Burton Latimer (ward) =

Burton Latimer Ward (Kettering Borough Council)

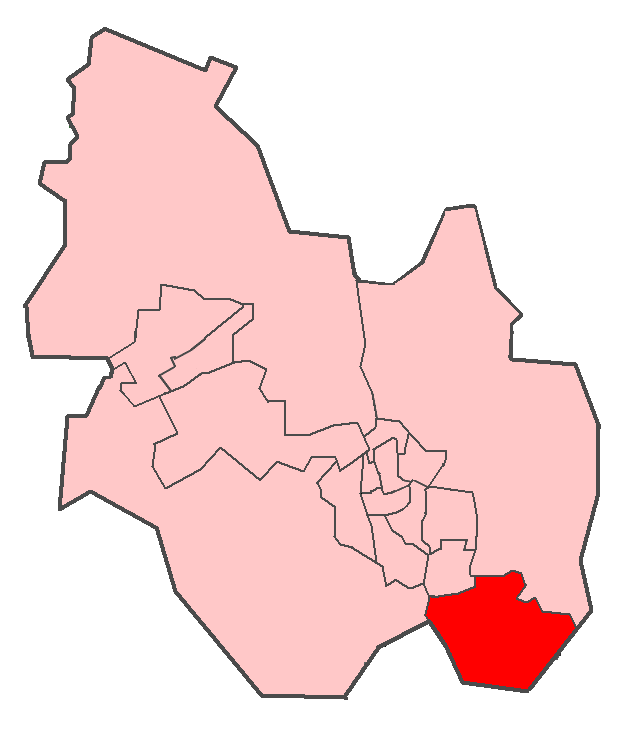
Burton Latimer within Kettering Borough

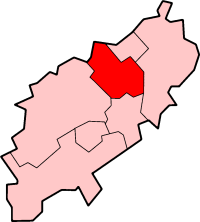
Kettering Borough within Northamptonshire

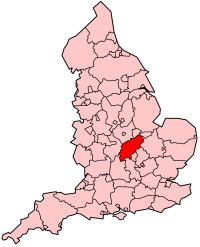
Northamptonshire within England

Burton Latimer Ward, representing the town of Burton Latimer, is a three-member ward within Kettering Borough Council. The ward was last fought at borough council level in the 2007 local council elections, in which two seats were won by Independent candidates and one seat won by the Conservatives.

The current councillors are Cllr. Ruth Groome, Cllr. Jan Smith and Cllr. John Currall.

== Councillors ==
Kettering Borough Council elections 2007

- Christopher Groome (Independent)
- Ruth Groome (Independent)
- Derek Zanger (Conservative)

== Current ward boundaries (2007-) ==
=== Kettering Borough Council elections 2007 ===
- Note: due to boundary changes, vote changes listed below are based on notional results.

Burton Latimer (3 seats)
Party	Candidate	Votes	%	±%
Conservative	Derek Zanger (E)	927		
Independent	Ruth Groome (E)	844		
Independent	Christopher Groome (E)	821		
Conservative	Jamie Richardson	800		
Conservative	David Gunn	678		
Independent	Maureen Jerram	678		
Labour	Nicola Keating	264		
Labour	Vic Threadgold	233		
Labour	Brenda McCraith	214		
Turnout		1,881	35.0	

== See also ==
- Kettering
- Kettering Borough Council
