= Ise Lodge =

Former electoral ward in Kettering, Northamptonshire, England

Ise Lodge Ward (Kettering Borough Council)

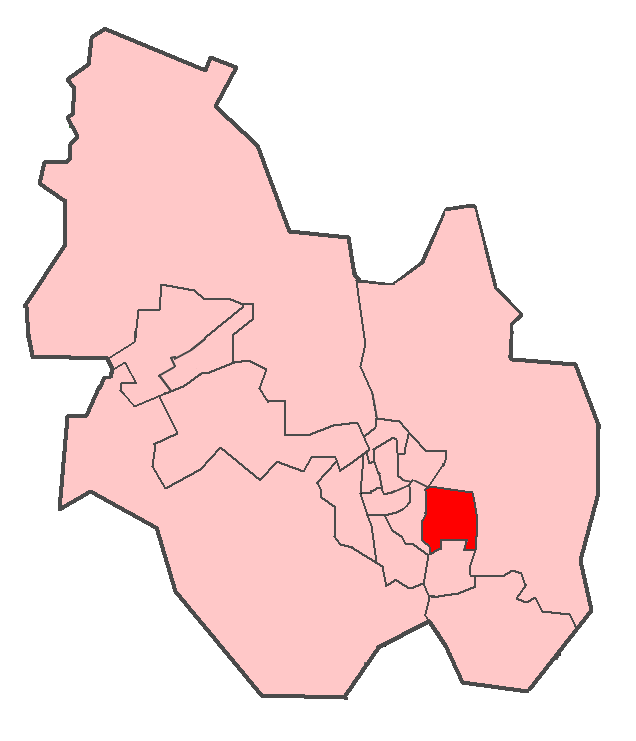
Ise Lodge Ward within Kettering Borough

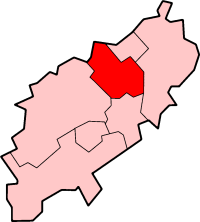
Kettering Borough within Northamptonshire

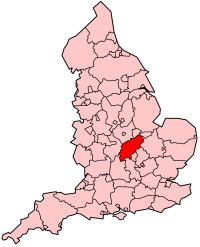
Northamptonshire within England

Ise Lodge Ward, formed from the merger of Millbrook ward and the majority of Spinney, was created by boundary changes in 2007 covering roughly the same area covered by Ise Valley Ward prior to 1999.

The ward was last fought at borough council level in the 2007 local council elections, in which all three seats were won by the Conservatives.

The current councillors are Cllr. Philip Hollobone, Cllr. Lloyd Bunday and Cllr. Shirley Lynch.

The neighborhood received a play area revamp in 2023.

== Councillors ==
Kettering Borough Council elections 2007

- Bob Civil (Conservative)
- Matt Lynch (Conservative)
- Shirley Lynch (Conservative)

== Current ward boundaries (2007-) ==
=== Kettering Borough Council elections 2007 ===
- Note: due to boundary changes, vote changes listed below are based on notional results.

Ise Lodge (3 seats)
Party	Candidate	Votes	%	±%
Conservative	Bob Civil (E)	1463		
Conservative	Matt Lynch (E)	1404		
Conservative	Shirley Lynch (E)	1372		
Labour	Adrian Perrin	580		
Labour	Nicholas Weingard	561		
Labour	Sushila Wright	555		
Turnout		2,186	38.2	

== See also ==
- Kettering
- Kettering Borough Council
