= Rothwell (Kettering ward) =

Electoral ward in the UK

Ise Lodge Ward (Kettering Borough Council)

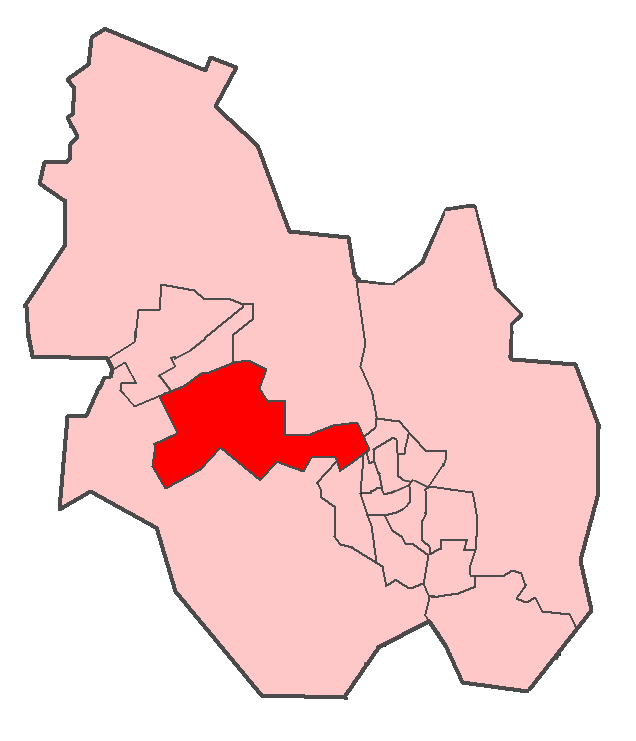
Rothwell Ward within Kettering Borough

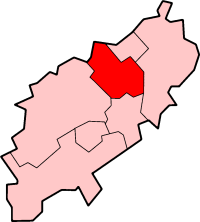
Kettering Borough within Northamptonshire

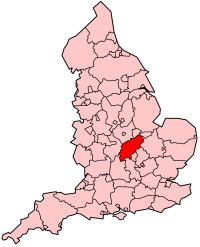
Northamptonshire within England

Rothwell Ward, representing the town of Rothwell and formed from the merger of Trinity and Tresham, was created by boundary changes in 2007.

The ward was last fought at borough council level in the 2007 local council elections, in which all three seats were won by the Conservatives.

The current councillors are Cllr. Cedwien Brown, Cllr. Karl Sumpter and Cllr. Margaret Talbot.

== Councillors ==
Kettering Borough Council elections 2007

- Cedwien Brown (Conservative)
- Alan Pote (Conservative)
- Margaret Talbot (Conservative)

== Current ward boundaries (2007-) ==
=== Kettering Borough Council elections 2007 ===
- Note: due to boundary changes, vote changes listed below are based on notional results.

Rothwell (3)
Party	Candidate	Votes	%	±%
Conservative	Alan Pote	1293		
Conservative	Cedwien Brown	1257		
Conservative	Margaret Talbot	1173		
Labour	David Jones	1010		
Labour	Glenda Weston	950		
Labour	Mark Hughes	886		
Turnout		2,380	41.8	

== See also ==
- Kettering
- Kettering Borough Council
