= Avondale Grange =

Kettering Borough Council Two member ward

Avondale Grange Ward (Kettering Borough Council)

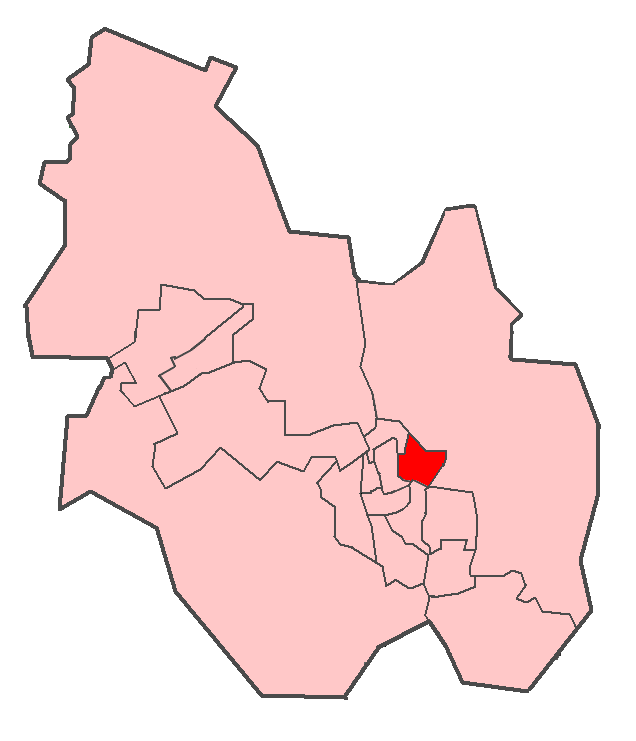
Avondale Grange within Kettering Borough

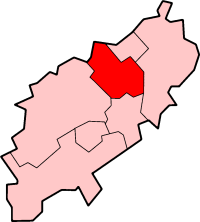
Kettering Borough within Northamptonshire

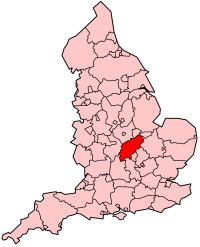
Northamptonshire within England

Avondale Grange was a two-member ward within Kettering Borough Council, created by boundary changes that took effect in 2007. It existed until the council's abolition in 2021. The ward was last fought at borough council level in the 2015 Kettering Council election on 7 May 2015, when both seats were won by Labour.

== Councillors ==
Kettering Borough Council elections 2015

- Linda Adams (Labour)
- Clark Mitchell (Labour)

== Ward boundaries (2007-2021) ==
=== Kettering Borough Council elections 2015 ===
Avondale Grange (2)
| Party | Candidate | Votes | % | ±% |
|---|---|---|---|---|
| Labour | Linda Adams (E) | 729 | | |
| Labour | Clark Mitchell (E) | 678 | | |
| UKIP | Edward Brace | 659 | | |
| UKIP | John Raffill | 527 | | |
| Conservative | Carolyn Carter | 516 | | |
| Conservative | Robin Carter | 472 | | |
| Green | Keith Stafford | 184 | | |
| Turnout | | | | |

== See also ==
- Kettering
- Kettering Borough Council
