= Queen Eleanor & Buccleuch =

Queen Eleanor & Buccleuch (Kettering Borough Council)

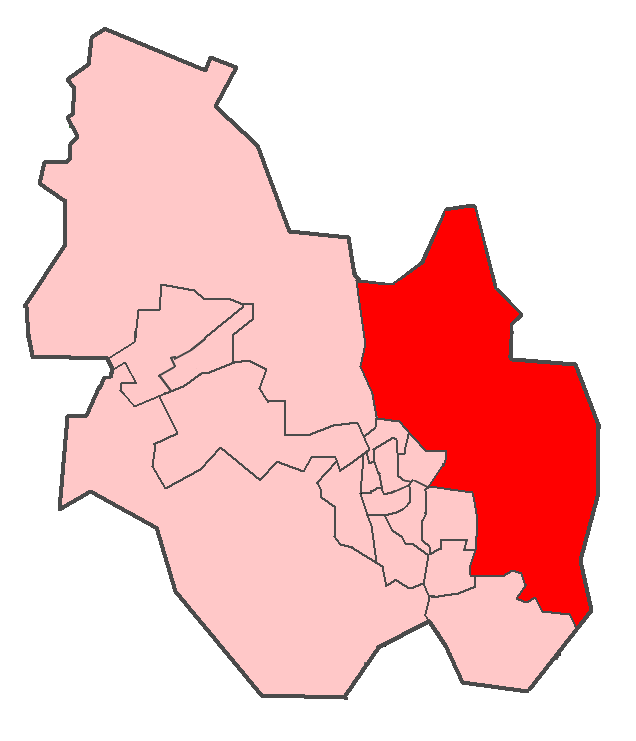
Queen Eleanor & Buccleuch within Kettering Borough

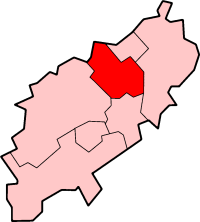
Kettering Borough within Northamptonshire

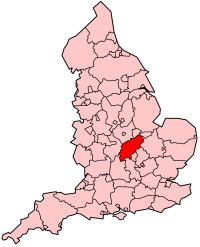
Northamptonshire within England

Queen Eleanor & Buccleuch Ward, representing the villages of Cranford, Geddington, Grafton Underwood, Little Oakley, Newton, Warkton and Weekley, is a one-member ward within Kettering Borough Council.

The current councillor is Cllr Mark Rowley.

== Councillors ==
Kettering Borough Council elections 2007

- Jonathan Bullock (Conservative)

== Current ward boundaries (2007-) ==
=== Kettering Borough Council elections 2007 ===
- Note: due to boundary changes, vote changes listed below are based on notional results.

Queen Eleanor & Buccleuch (1)
| Party | Candidate | Votes | % | ±% |
|---|---|---|---|---|
| Conservative | Jonathan Bullock (E) | 656 | 51.1 | −5.3 |
| Labour | John Padwick | 627 | 48.9 | +5.3 |
| Majority | | 29 | 2.3 | −5.3 |
| Turnout | | 1284 | 59.5 | |

== See also ==
- Kettering
- Kettering Borough Council
