= Philip Hollobone =

British politician

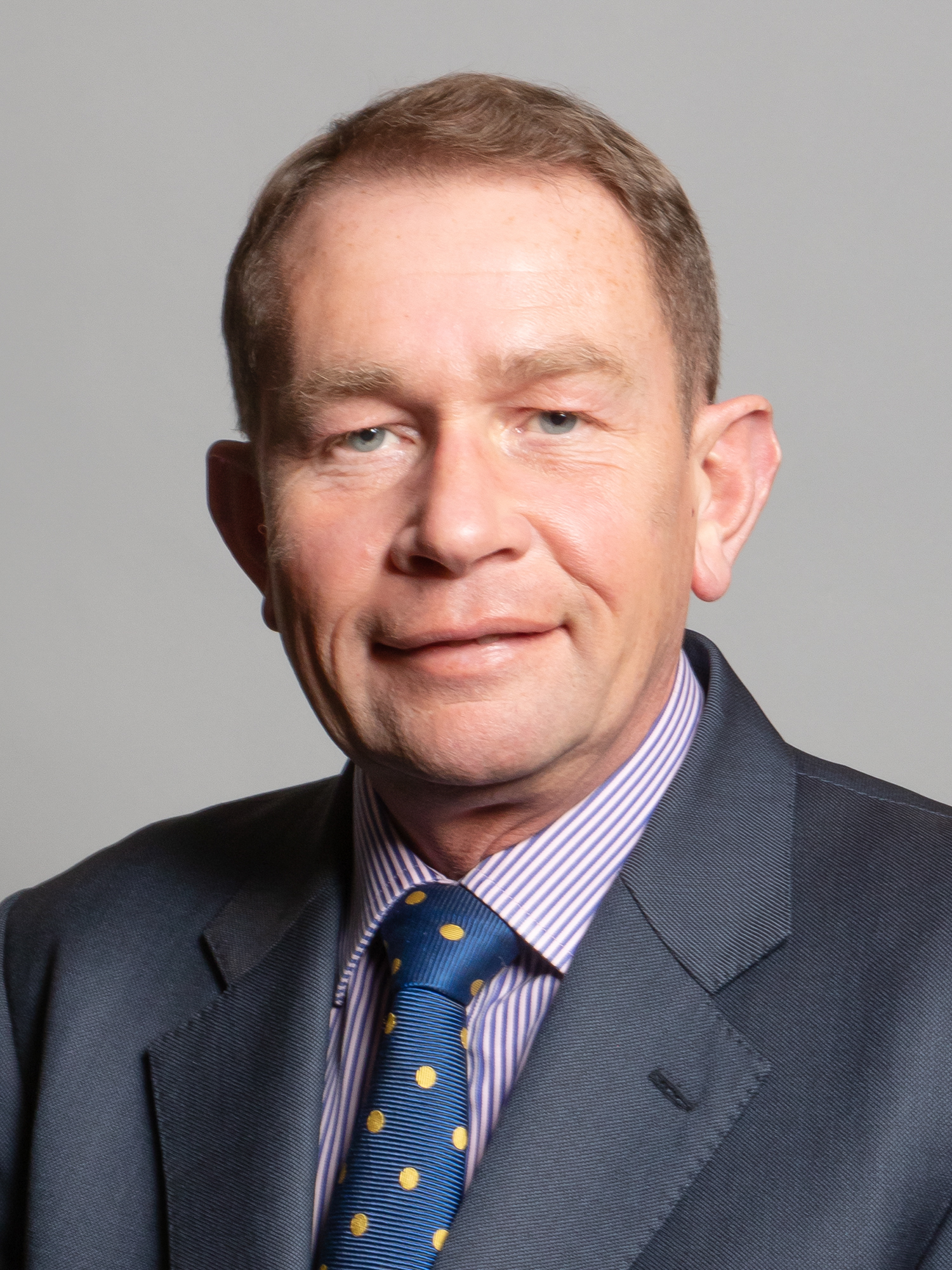
- Official portrait, 2020

Member of Parliament for Kettering
- In office 5 May 2005 – 30 May 2024
- Preceded by: Phil Sawford
- Succeeded by: Rosie Wrighting

Personal details
- Born: Philip Thomas Hollobone; 7 November 1964 (age 61) Bromley, Kent, England
- Party: Conservative
- Spouse: Donna Cooksey (m. 2001; div. 2013)
- Children: 2
- Education: Lady Margaret Hall, Oxford

Military service
- Allegiance: United Kingdom
- Branch/service: Territorial Army
- Years of service: 1989–1997
- Rank: Corporal
- Unit: Oxford University Officer Training Corps Honourable Artillery Company Artists Rifles

Philip Thomas Hollobone (born 7 November 1964) is a former British Conservative Party politician and former investment banker. He was the Member of Parliament for Kettering from the 2005 general election to the 2024 general election.

== Early life ==
Hollobone was born on 7 November 1964 in Bromley, Kent. He was privately educated at Dulwich College, where he was a contemporary of Reform UK leader Nigel Farage. He went on to study at Lady Margaret Hall, Oxford where he was awarded a BA degree in Modern History and Economics. He was a member of the Oxford University branch of the Conservative Monday Club – a 'hard right' pressure group that was later disassociated from the Conservative Party over its policies, such as the voluntary repatriation of ethnic minorities.

In 1984, he was placed by Project Trust as a volunteer teaching assistant with a Baptist Mission in Bay Islands, Honduras initially at Punta Gorda on Roatán and later a school on Guanaja. He worked for various companies as an industry research analyst examining the performance of water, gas and electricity companies across the UK and investment banker between 1987 and 2003 and was in the Territorial Army between 1987 and 1995, latterly as a paratrooper

== Political career ==
His elected political career began in the London Borough of Bromley, where he served as a councillor for the Martins Hill & Town ward between 1990 and 1994, when he did not stand again and the Liberal Democrat candidate won his former seat. He unsuccessfully contested Lewisham East at the 1997 General Election where he was defeated by the sitting Labour MP Bridget Prentice by 12,127 votes. In 1998 he sought re-election to the London Borough of Bromley in his former ward, but was defeated by the Liberal Democrats.

He was later selected as the Conservative candidate for the marginal Northamptonshire constituency of Kettering for the 2001 general election; he lost to incumbent Labour MP Phil Sawford by 665 votes. Following his defeat, Hollobone moved to Kettering and secured election in 2003 to Kettering Borough Council—first representing the rural ward of Buccleuch, before representing the suburban ward of Piper's Hill from 2007. He also became Vice Chairman of the Kettering Conservative Constituency Association in 2002. He was re-elected as a councillor in 2011, but did not re-stand in 2015.

Hollobone secured election to the House of Commons at his third attempt, during the 2005 general election, defeating Phil Sawford by 3,301 votes. He made his maiden speech on 24 May 2005.

Some of his subsequent speeches were not well received. In 2006, he was one of three new MPs specifically mentioned in an article in The Times about manipulating the performance figures for the TheyWorkForYou website. The article claimed new MPs boosted "their ratings on the internet by saying very little, very often". Whilst Hollobone's frequent "speeches" might give the appearance of "Churchill or Gladstone", many were interventions of only two or three sentences. In response, Hollobone said that as a new MP he tried to speak as often as possible on behalf of constituents and take part in many different debates.

Hollobone was rated as the Conservatives' most rebellious MP in 2010. He stated that his job is to "represent constituents in Westminster, it's not to represent Westminster in the constituency".

He was re-elected at the 2010 general election, 2015 general election and 2017 general election.

In March 2015, Hollobone was criticised by The Independent for being one of 4 MPs who voted against a Bill to increase the powers of the House of Lords to penalise peers who had broken the law and expel the worst offenders. This followed an expenses scandal relating to the former peer Lord Hanningfield. Hollobone argued the act could be used to discriminate against older male peers.

In February 2018, following the announcement that Northamptonshire County Council had brought in a "section 114" notice, putting it in special measures following a crisis in its finances, Hollobone was one of seven local MPs who released a statement arguing that the problems with the authority were by reason of mismanagement from the Conservative councillors who led it rather than funding cuts from the Conservative Government. They further argued that government commissioners should take over the running of the council.

In March 2018, he joined three other Conservative backbench MPs in "talking out" a bill by Green Party MP Caroline Lucas, which aimed to reverse private sector involvement in the NHS. By filibustering for three-and-a-half hours, Lucas was left with just 17 minutes to present her bill, which was subsequently shelved without a vote.

In Parliament he served on the Panel of Chairs, for which he received an annual payment of £16,422 (in addition to his MP's salary of £82,932.04). He has previously been a member of the Transport Committee and the Backbench Business Committee.

At the 2024 general election, Hollobone lost his seat to Labour Party candidate Rosie Wrighting after 19 years.

=== Expenses ===
In April 2009, Hollobone was reported to be the thriftiest Member of Parliament in terms of expenses: the average MP claimed £144,176 whereas Hollobone's expenses bill amounted to £47,737. In response to a written question by Hollobone, the expenses claimed for public duties by former Prime Ministers after they had left office was revealed to the public. In November 2017, Hollobone was reported to be the MP who had benefited from the largest sum of expenses that he was not entitled to, but had not been forced to pay the money back. The unjustified claim of £17,000 was written off because the expenses watchdog admitted that it should have picked up on the error earlier.

== Political views ==
Hollobone is regarded as being on the right wing of the Conservative Party, and is a member of the socially conservative Cornerstone Group. He has advocated the privatisation of the BBC and policies such as bringing back capital punishment and military conscription.

In 2013, Hollobone was one of four MPs who "camped" in rotation for four days in a parliamentary committee room outside the Public Bill Office, in order to be first in the queue to put down their private members' bills. What they called an "Alternative Queen's Speech" was their attempt to show what a "future" Conservative government should do. Some 42 policies were listed including reintroduction of the death penalty, banning the burka in public places and preparation to leave the European Union, scrapping wind farm subsidies, and renaming the late August Bank Holiday as "Margaret Thatcher Day".

Hollobone was a supporter of the Better Off Out campaign, which campaigned for Britain's withdrawal from the EU. The Eurosceptic UK Independence Party did not field a candidate against Hollobone in the 2010 general election and subsequently campaigned for his re-election as a result of his Eurosceptic views. Hollobone continued to deny speculation that he would be the most likely MP to follow Douglas Carswell and Mark Reckless in defecting to UKIP and remained a Conservative MP. UKIP did not field a candidate against him again in the 2017 general election.

=== Burqas ===
In February 2010, Hollobone described the wearing of burqas as like "going round wearing a paper bag over your head" and expressed his "huge sympathy" with those calling for a ban on the garments. He went on to say that he would refuse to speak with constituents wearing burkas if they came to see him, although he did not cite any examples of where this had happened in the past and he was told by the advocacy group Liberty that he could face legal action if he was to do so.

On 30 June 2010, Hollobone introduced the Face Coverings (Regulation) Bill, which would regulate the use of certain facial coverings, including the burka, in public. However, his bill did not progress further towards adoption.

== Personal life ==
Hollobone married Donna Cooksey in St John's Church, Cranford St John, North Northamptonshire in June 2001. They had a son, Thomas, in June 2004 and a daughter, Emily, in 2006 and lived in Barton Seagrave, North Northamptonshire. They separated in 2012 and divorced in 2013. Hollobone has played occasionally for Kettering Rugby Football Club in the past and served as a special constable with British Transport Police for six years, until he was asked to resign in 2015 due to new rules prohibiting police officers from taking part in active politics.

Parliament of the United Kingdom
Preceded by Phil Sawford	Member of Parliament for Kettering; 2005–2024	Succeeded by Rosie Wrighting
