= Northfield (Kettering ward) =

Electoral ward in Kettering, Northamptonshire, England

Northfield (Kettering Borough Council)

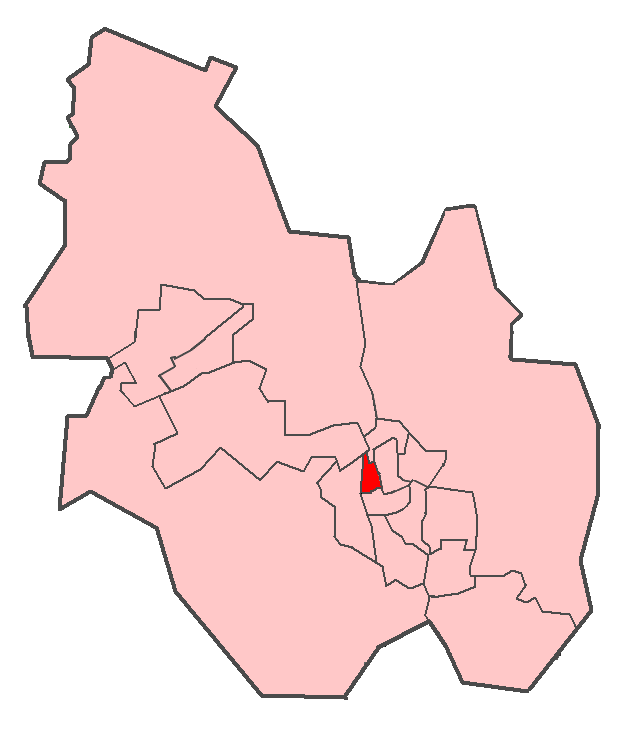
Northfield Ward within Kettering Borough

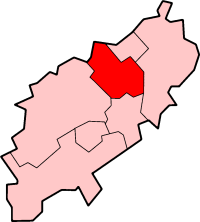
Kettering Borough within Northamptonshire

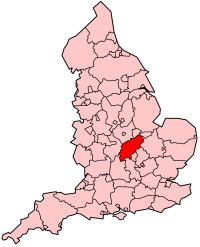
Northamptonshire within England

Northfield Ward is a 1-member ward within Kettering Borough Council. The ward was created as part of boundary changes in 2007 and was carved out of the part of the former St. Andrews Ward. The ward was last fought at borough council level in the 2007 local council elections, in which the seat was won by the Labour.

The current councillor is Cllr. Jonathan Vest.

== Councillors ==
Kettering Borough Council elections 2007

- Gil Rennie (Labour)

== Current ward boundaries (2007-) ==
=== Kettering Borough Council elections 2007 ===
- Note: due to boundary changes, vote changes listed below are based on the 2003 result for St Andrews ward, from which Northfield ward was carved.

Northfield (1)
Party	Candidate	Votes	%	±%
Labour	Gil Rennie (E)	366	55.5	−6.7
Conservative	Lloyd Bunday	293	44.5	+6.7
Turnout		702	36.4	

== See also ==
- Kettering
- Kettering Borough Council
