= William Knibb (ward) =

Electoral ward in Kettering, Northamptonshire, England

William Knibb Ward (Kettering Borough Council)

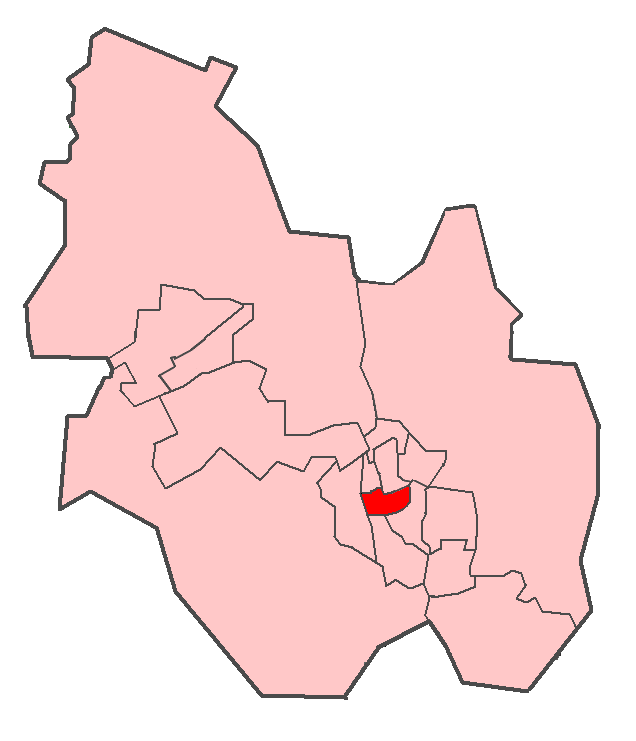
William Knibb within Kettering Borough

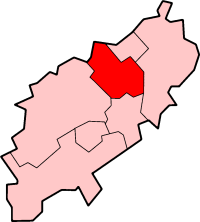
Kettering Borough within Northamptonshire

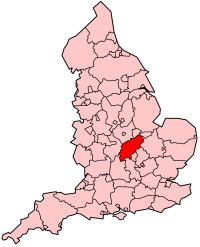
Northamptonshire within England

William Knibb is a two-member ward within Kettering Borough Council, created by boundary changes that took effect in 2007, having been carved out of part of the former St. Mary's ward in Kettering town. The ward was named after William Knibb, Baptist missionary in Jamaica, and covers the town centre as well as the area around Mill Road just east of the centre. It was fought at borough council level on Thursday 3 May 2007, at which both seats were won by Labour.

The current councillors are Cllr. Kirsty Watts and Cllr. Michael Scrimshaw.

== Councillors ==
Kettering Borough Council elections 2007

- Keli Watts (Labour)
- David Bishop (Labour)

== Current ward boundaries (2007-) ==
=== Kettering Borough Council elections 2007 ===
- Note: due to boundary changes, vote changes listed below are based on notional results.

William Knibb (2)
Party	Candidate	Votes	%	±%
Labour	Keli Watts (E)	699		
Labour	David Bishop (E)	637		
Conservative	James Burton	625		
Conservative	Kenneth Jack	540		
Turnout		1,351	36.2	

== See also ==
- Kettering
- Kettering Borough Council
