= Slade (Kettering ward) =

Electoral ward in Kettering, Northamptonshire, England

Slade Ward (Kettering Borough Council)

Slade Ward within Kettering Borough

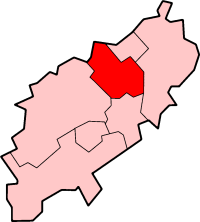
Kettering Borough within Northamptonshire

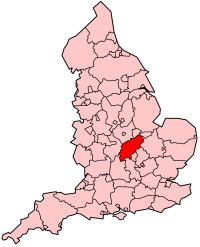
Northamptonshire within England

Slade Ward is a two-seat ward of Kettering Borough Council, covering the southern rural parts of Kettering Borough.

The ward was last fought at borough council level in the 2007 local council elections, in which both seats were won by the Conservatives.

The current councillors are Cllr. Jim Hakewill and Cllr. Cliff Moreton.

== Councillors ==
Kettering Borough Council elections 2007

- Jim Hakewill (Conservative)
- Victoria Perry (Conservative)

== Current ward boundaries (1999-) ==
=== Kettering Borough Council elections 2007 ===
- Note: due to boundary changes, vote changes listed below are based on notional results.

Slade (2)
Party	Candidate	Votes	%	±%
Conservative	Jim Hakewill (E)	1094		
Conservative	Victoria Perry (E)	1079		
Independent	Peter Chaplin	386		
Labour	Maggie Philip	325		
Labour	Ian Watts	301		
Turnout		1,724	42.2	

=== Kettering Borough Council elections 2003 ===
Kettering Borough Council elections 2003: Slade Ward
Party	Candidate	Votes	%	±%
Conservative	Jim Hakewill	903	37.5	
Conservative	Michael Harrison	890	37.0	
Labour	Martin Moloney	323	13.4	
Labour	Sushila Wright	290	12.1	

Ward summary
Party	Votes	% votes	Seats	Change
Conservative	897	74.5	2	0
Labour	307	25.5	0	0
Total votes cast	1,203			
Electorate	3,564			
Turnout	33.8%			

(Vote count shown is ward average.)

== See also ==
- Kettering
- Kettering Borough Council
