= St Peters (Kettering ward) =

Former electoral ward in Kettering, Northamptonshire, England

St. Peter's Ward (Kettering Borough Council)

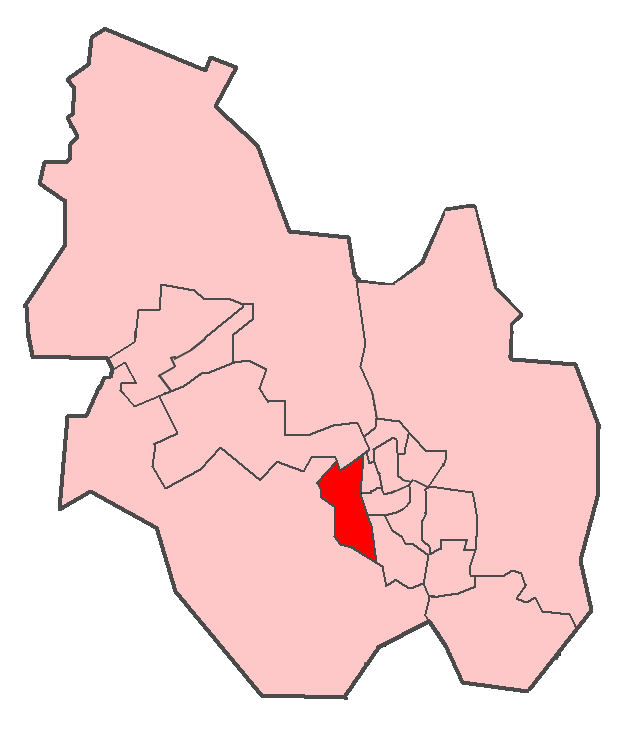
St. Peter's Ward within Kettering Borough

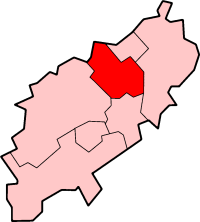
Kettering Borough within Northamptonshire

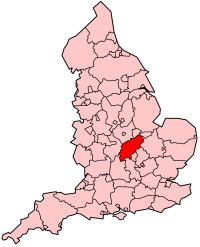
Northamptonshire within England

St. Peter's Ward is a two-seat ward of Kettering Borough Council. The ward was last fought at borough council level in the 2007 local council elections, in which both seats were won by the Conservatives.

The current councillors are Cllr. Ian Jelly, Cllr Terry Tibbs and Cllr. Paul Marks.

== Councillors ==
Kettering Borough Council elections 2007

- Terry Freer (Conservative)
- Mary Malin (Conservative)

== Current ward boundaries (2007–) ==
=== Kettering Borough Council elections 2007 ===
Kettering Borough Council elections 2007: St Peter's Ward
Party	Candidate	Votes	%	±%
Conservative	Terry Tibbs (E)	923		
Conservative	Mary Malin (E)	896		
Labour	Maggie Don	404		
Labour	Cassie Watts	365		
Turnout		1,405	40.2	

=== Kettering Borough Council elections 2003 ===
Kettering Borough Council elections 2003: St. Peter's Ward
Party	Candidate	Votes	%	±%
Conservative	Terry Freer	848	40.0	
Conservative	Mary Malin	802	37.8	
Labour	Ian Watts	238	11.2	
Labour	Shona Scrimshaw	234	11.0	

Ward summary
Party	Votes	% votes	Seats	Change
Conservative	825	77.8	2	0
Labour	236	22.2	0	0
Total votes cast	1,061			
Electorate	3,441			
Turnout	30.8%			

(Vote count shown is ward average.)

== See also ==
- Kettering
- Kettering Borough Council
