= St Michaels & Wicksteed =

St Michael's & Wicksteed (Kettering Borough Council)

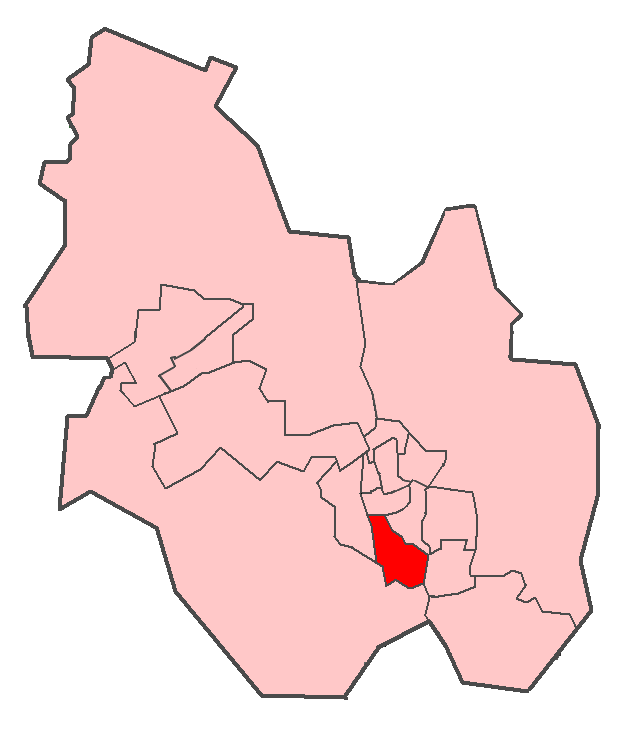
St Michael's & Wicksteed Ward within Kettering Borough

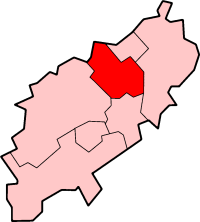
Kettering Borough within Northamptonshire

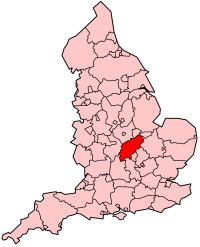
Northamptonshire within England

St Michael's & Wicksteed Ward, formed from the merger of St Michaels Ward and Wicksteed Ward, is a ward of Kettering Borough Council that was created by boundary changes in 2007.

The ward was last fought at borough council level in the 2007 local council elections, in which all three seats were won by the Conservatives.

As of May 2025, the current councillors are Cllr. Polly Shackleton, Cllr. Julia Thorley, and Cllr. Alan Heath.

== Councillors ==
Kettering Borough Council elections 2007

- Jenny Henson (Conservative)
- Larry Henson (Conservative)
- Scott Edwards (Conservative)

== Current ward boundaries (2007-) ==
=== Kettering Borough Council wlections 2007 ===
- Note: due to boundary changes, vote changes listed below are based on notional results.

St. Michael's & Wicksteed (3)
Party	Candidate	Votes	%	±%
Conservative	Jenny Henson (E)	929	15.0	−3.9
Conservative	Larry Henson (E)	917	14.8	−3.8
Conservative	Scott Edwards (E)	911	14.7	−3.7
Labour	Alex Gordon	909	14.7	−0.2
Labour	Peter Holmes	869	14.0	−0.7
Labour	Ronald Steele	797	12.9	−1.5
Liberal Democrats	Valerie McGlynn	307	5.0	+5.0
Liberal Democrats	Chris McGlynn	284	4.6	+4.6
Liberal Democrats	Chris Nelson	277	4.5	+4.5
Turnout		2,191	39.4	

=== Notional result: Kettering Borough Council elections 2003 ===
- Note: This ward was created in boundary changes that took effect in May 2007. The figures below are derived from the 2003 results for the former St Michaels and Wicksteed wards.

St. Michael's & Wicksteed (3)
Party	Candidate	Votes	%	±%
Conservative	(E)	1120	18.9	
Conservative	(E)	1004	18.6	
Conservative	(E)	1090	18.4	
Labour		884	14.9	
Labour		871	14.7	
Labour		853	14.4	
Turnout				

== See also ==
- Kettering
- Kettering Borough Council
