= Barton (ward) =

Electoral ward in Kettering, Northamptonshire, England

Barton Ward (Kettering Borough Council)

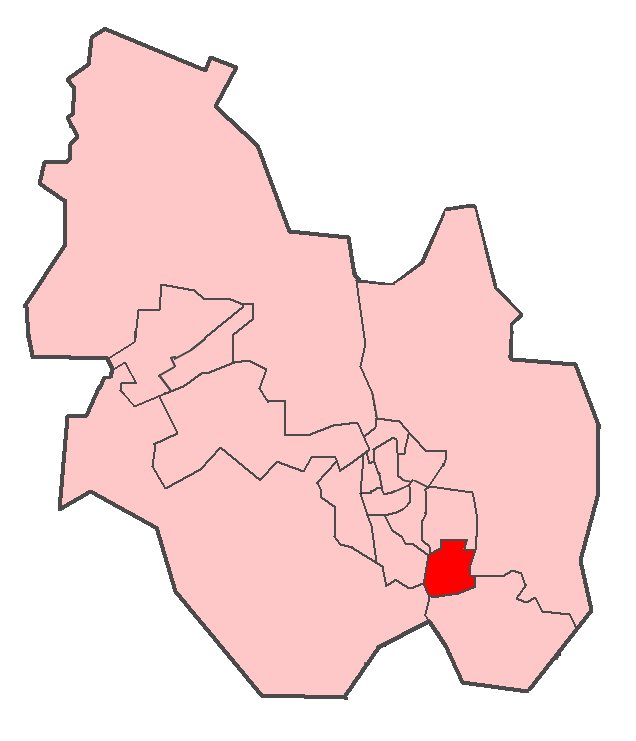
Barton within Kettering Borough

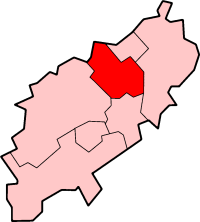
Kettering Borough within Northamptonshire

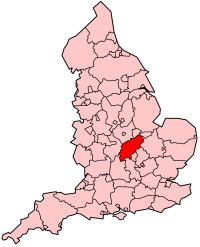
Northamptonshire within England

Barton Ward, representing the village of Barton Seagrave, was a two-member ward within the former Kettering Borough Council.

The ward was abolished in 2021 when Kettering Borough Council was merged into the new North Northamptonshire Council.

== Former Councillors ==
Kettering Borough Council elections 2007

- Christopher Lamb (Conservative)
- Russell Roberts (Conservative)

== Ward boundaries (2007-2021) ==
=== Kettering Borough Council elections 2007 ===
- Note: due to boundary changes, vote changes listed below are based on notional results.

Barton (2)
| Party | Candidate | Votes | % | ±% |
|---|---|---|---|---|
| Conservative | Russell Roberts (E) | 1091 | | |
| Conservative | Christopher Lamb (E) | 1024 | | |
| Labour | Sam Smith | 439 | | |
| Labour | Archie Welsh | 396 | | |
| Turnout | | 1,563 | 40.0 | |

== Previous ward boundaries (1999-2007) ==
=== Kettering Borough Council elections 2003 ===
Kettering Borough Council elections 2003: Barton Ward
| Party | Candidate | Votes | % | ±% |
|---|---|---|---|---|
| Conservative | Maurice Bayes | 860 | 34.8 | |
| Conservative | Christopher Lamb | 853 | 34.5 | |
| Labour | Christine McAlinden | 391 | 15.8 | |
| Labour | Margaret Philip | 370 | 15.0 | |

Ward summary
| Party | Votes | % votes | Seats | Change |
|---|---|---|---|---|
| Conservative | 857 | 69.2 | 2 | 0 |
| Labour | 381 | 30.8 | 0 | 0 |
| Total votes cast | 1,237 | | | |
| Electorate | 3,402 | | | |
| Turnout | 36.4% | | | |

(Vote count shown is ward average.)

== See also ==
- Kettering
- Kettering Borough Council
