= 1999 Kettering Borough Council election =

1999 UK local government election

Elections to Kettering Borough Council were held on 6 May 1999. The whole council was up for election and boundary changes had taken place since the last election in 1995. The Labour Party lost its overall majority, the council coming under no overall control.

== Election result ==
Kettering local election result 1999
Party	Seats	Gains	Losses	Net gain/loss	Seats %	Votes %	Votes	+/−
Labour	22			-9	48.9			
Conservative	18			+11	40.0			
Liberal Democrats	1			-2	2.2			
Independent	4			+1	8.9			
