= Borough of Kettering =

Borough in England (1974–2021)

Coordinates: 52.45°N 0.80°W

- Non-metropolitan district and borough
- Logo

- Shown within Northamptonshire
- Sovereign state: United Kingdom
- Constituent country: England
- Region: East Midlands
- Administrative county: Northamptonshire
- Admin. HQ: Kettering

Government
  - Type: Kettering Borough Council
  - Leadership: Leader & Cabinet
  - Executive

Area
  - Total: 90.15 sq mi (233.49 km^{2})

Population (2024)
  - Total: 101,776
  - Density: 1,129.0/sq mi (435.89/km^{2})
- Time zone: UTC+0 (Greenwich Mean Time)
  - Summer (DST): UTC+1 (British Summer Time)
- ONS code: 34UE (ONS); E07000153 (GSS)
- Ethnicity: 96.7% White; 1.7% S.Asian
- Website: kettering.gov.uk

The Borough of Kettering was a local government district and borough in Northamptonshire, England, from 1974 to 2021. It was named after its main town, Kettering, where the council was based. It bordered onto the district of Harborough in the neighbouring county of Leicestershire, the borough of Corby, the district of East Northamptonshire, the district of Daventry and the borough of Wellingborough.

== Abolition and replacement ==
In March 2018, following suspension of the county council arising from its becoming insolvent, due to financial and cultural mismanagement by the cabinet and officers, the then Secretary of State for Local Government, Sajid Javid, sent commissioner Max Caller into the council, who recommended the county council and all district and borough councils in the county be abolished, and replaced by two unitary authorities, one covering the West, and one the North of the county. These proposals were approved in April 2019. It meant that the districts of Daventry, Northampton and South Northamptonshire were merged to form a new unitary authority called West Northamptonshire, whilst the second unitary authority North Northamptonshire consists of Corby, East Northamptonshire, Kettering and Wellingborough districts. These new authorities came into being on 1 April 2021. Elections for the new authorities were due to be held on 7 May 2020, but were delayed due to the COVID-19 pandemic.

== Settlements and parishes ==
Other than Kettering itself, the borough included:

- Ashley
- Barton Seagrave, Brampton Ash, Braybrooke, Broughton, Burton Latimer
- Cranford, Cransley
- Desborough, Dingley
- Geddington, Grafton Underwood
- Harrington
- Loddington
- Mawsley Village
- Newton and Little Oakley
- Orton
- Pytchley
- Rothwell, Rushton
- Stoke Albany, Sutton Bassett
- Thorpe Malsor
- Warkton, Weekley, Weston by Welland, Wilbarston

== Arms ==
Coat of arms of Borough of Kettering

Crest
On a wreath Or and Sable a representation of the Geddington Queen Eleanor Memorial Cross Proper between two fountains each charged with a martlet Sable.
Escutcheon
Sable on a fess Argent between in chief a garb Or between two annulets embattled on the outer edge Argent and in base a pelt Or five Lozenges conjoined Gules.
Supporters
On the dexter side a female figure richly attired in antique habit Azure and upon her head a plume of three ostrich feathers Argent and on the sinister side a Negro Proper habited about the waist with a cloth and his sinister wrist encircled with a handcuff pendent therefrom a broken chain Azure.
Motto
Progressio Et Concordia (Progress And Concord)

== See also ==
- Grade I listed buildings in Kettering (borough)
- Grade II* listed buildings in Kettering (borough)
