= East Northamptonshire District Council elections =

Local government elections in Northamptonshire, England

East Northamptonshire District Council in Northamptonshire, England was elected every four years. After the last boundary changes in 2007, 40 councillors were elected from 22 wards. The district was abolished in 2021, with the area becoming part of North Northamptonshire.

== Political control ==
The first election was held in 1973. The council then acted as a shadow authority alongside the outgoing authorities until 1 April 1974 when it formally came into being. From 1974 until its abolition in 2021, political control of the council was as follows:

Party in control	Years
Conservative	1974–1995
Labour	1995–1999
Conservative	1999–2021

=== Leadership ===
The leaders of the council from 2009 until the council's abolition in 2021 were:

Councillor	Party	From	To
Andy Mercer	Conservative		Oct 2010
Steven North	Conservative	4 Oct 2010	31 Mar 2021

== Council elections ==
- 1973 East Northamptonshire District Council election
- 1976 East Northamptonshire District Council election
- 1979 East Northamptonshire District Council election (New ward boundaries)
- 1983 East Northamptonshire District Council election
- 1987 East Northamptonshire District Council election
- 1991 East Northamptonshire District Council election
- 1995 East Northamptonshire District Council election
- 1999 East Northamptonshire District Council election (New ward boundaries)
- 2003 East Northamptonshire District Council election
- 2007 East Northamptonshire District Council election (New ward boundaries increased the number of seats by 4)
- 2011 East Northamptonshire District Council election
- 2015 East Northamptonshire District Council election (Some new ward boundaries)

== Election results ==
	Overall control	Conservative	Labour	Lib Dem (Note: SDP–Liberal Alliance in 1987.)	Independent
2015	Conservative	37	1	-	2
2011	Conservative	35	2	-	3
2007	Conservative	39	-	-	1
2003	Conservative	33	3	-	-
1999	Conservative	20	15	-	1
1995	Labour	9	25	2	-
1991	Conservative	23	9	3	1
1987	Conservative	30	5	1	-
1983	Conservative	30	6	-	-
1979	Conservative	30	5	-	1

== District results maps ==
1979 results map

1983 results map

1987 results map

1991 results map

1995 results map

1999 results map

2003 results map

2007 results map

2011 results map

2015 results map

== By-election results ==
=== 1995-1999 ===
Rushden East By-Election 16 May 1996
Party	Candidate	Votes	%	±%
Labour		656	75.4	
Conservative		214	24.6	
Majority		442	50.8	
Turnout		870	22.4	
Labour hold		Swing		

Woodford By-Election 12 September 1996
Party	Candidate	Votes	%	±%
Labour		325	65.1	
Conservative		174	34.9	
Majority		151	30.2	
Turnout		499		
Labour hold		Swing		

Rushden North By-Election 17 October 1996
Party	Candidate	Votes	%	±%
Labour		365	43.3	
Conservative		352	41.7	
Independent		127	15.1	
Majority		13	1.6	
Turnout		844	18.5	
Labour hold		Swing		

Rushden West By-Election 3 April 1997
Party	Candidate	Votes	%	±%
Labour		712	67.0	
Conservative		351	33.0	
Majority		361	34.0	
Turnout		1,063		
Labour hold		Swing		

Rushden South By-Election 13 November 1997
Party	Candidate	Votes	%	±%
Conservative		525	55.7	+15.2
Labour		418	44.3	−15.2
Majority		107	11.4	
Turnout		943	16.1	
Conservative gain from Labour		Swing		

=== 1999-2003 ===
Ringstead By-Election 14 October 1999
Party	Candidate	Votes	%	±%
Conservative		316	64.5	−6.6
Labour		174	35.5	+6.6
Majority		142	29.0	
Turnout		490	37.9	
Conservative hold		Swing		

Fineshade By-Election 18 April 2002
Party	Candidate	Votes	%	±%
Conservative		366	83.9	
Labour		70	16.1	
Majority		296	67.8	
Turnout		436		
Conservative hold		Swing		

Ringstead By-Election 18 April 2002
Party	Candidate	Votes	%	±%
Conservative		379	67.7	−3.4
Labour		181	32.3	+3.4
Majority		198	35.4	
Turnout		560		
Conservative hold		Swing		

=== 2003-2007 ===
Lower Nene By-Election 25 September 2003
Party	Candidate	Votes	%	±%
Conservative		unopposed		
Conservative hold		Swing		

Rushden East By-Election 27 July 2006
Party	Candidate	Votes	%	±%
Conservative	Sean Lever	506	66.4	+21.5
Labour	Stephen Allen	256	33.6	−2.9
Majority		250	32.8	
Turnout		762	15.8	
Conservative hold		Swing		

=== 2007-2011 ===
Higham Ferrers Lancaster By-Election 5 July 2007
Party	Candidate	Votes	%	±%
Conservative	Pam Whiting	unopposed		
Conservative hold		Swing		

=== 2011-2015 ===
Barnwell By-Election 14 June 2012
Party	Candidate	Votes	%	±%
Conservative	Derek Capp	412	64.1	N/A
Liberal Democrats	Karen Draycott	130	20.2	N/A
Labour	Phil Garnham	101	15.7	N/A
Majority		282	43.9	
Turnout		643		
Conservative hold		Swing		

Oundle By-Election 15 November 2012
Party	Candidate	Votes	%	±%
Conservative	Jake Vowles	1,003	52.4	−13.7
Labour	Paul King	681	35.6	+1.7
Liberal Democrats	George Smid	230	12.0	+12.0
Majority		322	16.8	
Turnout		1,914		
Conservative hold		Swing		

Thrapston Market By-Election 25 July 2013
Party	Candidate	Votes	%	±%
Conservative	Alex Smith	396	43.1	−12.4
Independent	Valerie Carter	210	22.9	+22.9
Labour	Alex Izycky	166	18.1	+18.1
UKIP	Joseph Garner	146	15.9	+15.9
Majority		186	20.3	
Turnout		918		
Conservative hold		Swing		

=== 2015-2021 ===
Prebendal By-Election 4 May 2017
Party	Candidate	Votes	%	±%
Conservative	Annabel de Capell Brooke	729	82.8	+6.7
Labour	Alan Brookfield	151	17.2	+2.8
Majority		578	65.6	
Turnout		880		
Conservative hold		Swing		

Higham Ferrers Lancaster By-Election 15 February 2018
Party	Candidate	Votes	%	±%
Conservative	Harriet Pentland	611	55.6	N/A
Liberal Democrats	Suzanna Austin	244	22.2	N/A
Labour	Mark Smith	189	17.2	N/A
Green	Simon Turner	33	3.0	N/A
UKIP	Bill Cross	22	2.0	N/A
Majority		367	33.4	
Turnout		1,099		
Conservative hold		Swing		

Irthlingborough Waterloo By-Election 8 August 2019
Party	Candidate	Votes	%	±%
Conservative	Lee Wilkes	542	53.1	−2.3
Labour	Caroline Cross	478	46.9	+11.7
Majority		64	6.3	
Turnout		1,020		
Conservative hold		Swing		

Higham Ferrers Chichele By-Election 12 December 2019
Party	Candidate	Votes	%	±%
Conservative	Bert Jackson	1,379	63.3	+16.1
Liberal Democrats	Suzanna Austin	800	36.7	+36.7
Majority		579	26.6	
Turnout		2,179		
Conservative hold		Swing		

Higham Ferrers Lancaster By-Election 12 December 2019
Party	Candidate	Votes	%	±%
Conservative	Peter Tomas	1,531	62.6	N/A
Liberal Democrats	Simon Baylis	913	37.4	N/A
Majority		618	25.2	
Turnout		2,444		
Conservative hold		Swing		
