= North Northamptonshire Council elections =

Local government elections in Northamptonshire, England

North Northamptonshire Council elections are held every four years. North Northamptonshire Council is a unitary authority covering the northern part of the ceremonial county of Northamptonshire. Since 2025, 68 councillors are elected from 31 wards. The council was created as a merger of East Northamptonshire District Council, Corby Borough Council, Kettering Borough Council, and Wellingborough Borough Council.

== Council elections ==
Year	Conservative	Labour	Reform	Green	Liberal Democrats	Independent	Council control after election
2021	60	14	0	3	0	1	Conservative
2025 (Note: Boundary changes reduced the number of seats by ten.)	13	4	39	8	1	1	Reform

=== Results maps ===
2021 results map

2025 results map

== By-elections ==
=== 2021-2025 ===
Oundle By-Election 17 February 2022
Party	Candidate	Votes	%	±%
Liberal Democrats	Charlie Best	1,683	47.2	+22.6
Conservative	Ollie Curtis	1,423	39.9	−3.5
Labour	Harry James	337	9.4	−4.9
Green	Kate Jones	124	3.5	−9.8
Majority		260	7.3	
Turnout		3,577		
Liberal Democrats gain from Conservative		Swing		

Northall By-Election 2 February 2023
Party	Candidate	Votes	%	±%
Labour	Keli Watts	1,027	38.0	−3.7
Conservative	Lesley Thurland	805	29.8	−14.6
Green	Ria Skelton	658	24.4	+24.4
Liberal Democrats	Stephen Silver	127	4.7	−9.2
Reform	Jehad Aburamadan	85	3.1	+3.1
Majority		222	8.4	
Turnout		2,702		
Labour gain from Conservative		Swing		

Rushden South By-Election 23 March 2023
Party	Candidate	Votes	%	±%
Conservative	Anne Melanie Coleman	1,210	54.6	+5.2
Labour	Chris Ashton	638	28.8	+6.6
Liberal Democrats	Blythe Cassandra Avery	157	7.1	−6.3
Breakthrough Party	Dave Merlane	120	5.4	+5.4
Green	Will Morris	93	4.2	−10.8
Majority		572	25.8	
Turnout		2,218		
Conservative hold		Swing		

Desborough By-Election 4 April 2024
Party	Candidate	Votes	%	±%
Conservative	William McElhinney	1,485	47.3	+7.5
Labour	Richard Tod	1,054	33.6	+6.1
Green	Olivia Stevenson	368	11.7	+2.7
Liberal Democrats	Alan Window	234	7.4	−2.3
Majority		431	13.7	
Turnout		3,141		
Conservative hold		Swing		

Burton and Broughton By-Election 10 October 2024
Party	Candidate	Votes	%	±%
Conservative	Alex Evelyn	939	46.4	+12.7
Green	Adrian Watts	489	24.1	+2.2
Liberal Democrats	Jenny Davies	337	16.6	−3.5
Labour	Nigel Padget	260	12.8	+1.5
Majority		450	22.2	
Turnout		2,025		
Conservative hold		Swing		

=== 2025-2029 ===
Lloyds and Corby Village By-Election 9 October 2025
Party	Candidate	Votes	%	±%
Reform	Lee Duffy	754	38.5	
Labour	Geri Cullen	635	32.4	
Green	Lee Forster	371	18.9	
Liberal Democrats	Alex Lock	113	5.8	
Conservative	Paul Byrne	86	4.4	
Majority		119	6.1	
Turnout		1,959		
Reform hold		Swing		
