= West Glebe Park =

Park in Corby, United Kingdom

- Interactive map of West Glebe Park
- Type: Park
- Location: Corby, Northamptonshire, England
- Coordinates: 52.4929°N 0.6947°W
- Operator: North Northamptonshire Council
- Open: All year
- Website: West Glebe Park

West Glebe Park is a park in Corby, Northamptonshire, England.

== History ==
The park sits on ground that was scarred by industrial use, from 1897 iron ore was mined at the site and from 1910 a blast furnace produced iron. The pit from which the iron ore was mined was up to 60 feet in depth. In 1916 the quarry was closed, it flooded and was used for swimming. The park was redeveloped in 2006 with a widened access road, added car parking and a new pavilion.

== Facilities ==
There is a visitor centre, children's play area, a BMX Track, a skate park, football pitches, a multi use games area for basketball and tennis, changing rooms and a community bar. Corby Parkrun takes place in the park.
