= 2025 North Northamptonshire Council election =

2025 English local election

- 1 May 2025 (Note: Only 66 of 68 seats were elected in 1 May. The poll for two councillors in the ward of Higham Ferrers was postponed until 12 June because of the death of the Liberal Democrat candidate, John Ratcliffe.)

All 68 seats to North Northamptonshire Council 35 seats needed for a majority

	First party	Second party	Third party
Leader	Martin Griffiths	Jason Smithers (retiring)	Emily Fedorowycz
Party	Reform	Conservative	Green
Last election	0 seats, 0.2%	60 seats, 52.8%	3 seats, 6.7%
Seats before	4	50	3
Seats won	40	14	8
Seat change	▲40	▼46	▲5
Popular vote	66,706	49,413	29,320
Percentage	35.0%	25.9%	15.4%
Swing	▲34.8%	▼26.9%	▲8.7%
	Fourth party	Fifth party	Sixth party
Leader	Matt Keane (defeated)	none	none
Party	Labour	Liberal Democrats	Independent
Last election	14 seats, 29.7%	0 seats, 6.9%	1 seat, 3.6%
Seats before	16	1 (Note: Being a vacant seat last held by the Liberal Democrats.)	4 (Note: Including one vacant seat last held by an independent.)
Seats won	4	1	1
Seat change	▼10	▲1	Steady
Popular vote	33,060	7,775	4,093
Percentage	17.4%	4.1%	2.1%
Swing	▼12.3%	▼2.8%	▼1.5%
- Winner of each seat at the 2025 North Northamptonshire Council election.
Leader before election
Jason Smithers
Conservative
Leader after election
Martin Griffiths
Reform

The 2025 North Northamptonshire Council election took place on 1 May 2025 to elect members to 68 seats on North Northamptonshire Council in Northamptonshire, England. It was held on the same day as other local elections. The council was under Conservative control prior to the election. Reform UK won a majority of the seats at the election.

== Background ==
At the 2021 election, the Conservatives won a majority of seats. The Conservative leader of the council prior to the election, Jason Smithers, did not stand for re-election in 2025.

New ward boundaries were drawn up to take effect for the 2025 election, reducing the number of seats from 78 to 68.

== Previous council composition ==
After 2021 election		Before 2025 election	
Party	Seats	Party	Seats
Conservative	60	Conservative	50
Labour	14	Labour	16
Green	3	Reform	4
Independent	1	Green	3
Reform	0	Independent	3
Vacant	N/A	Vacant	2

== Summary ==
Reform UK won a majority of the seats at the election. Their group leader, Martin Griffiths, was formally appointed as the new leader of the council at the subsequent annual council meeting on 20 May 2025. He had previously been a Conservative, and had been leader of one of the council's predecessors, the Borough Council of Wellingborough, for its last five years between 2016 and 2021.

=== Election result ===
2025 North Northamptonshire Council election (Note: Figures do not include the delayed election in the two-seat Higham Ferrers ward)
Party	Candidates	Seats	Gains	Losses	Net gain/loss	Seats %	Votes %	Votes	+/−
Reform	68	39	26	0	▲39	59.1	35.0	66,706	+34.8
Conservative	68	13	0	20	▼47	19.7	25.9	49,413	–26.9
Green	68	8	5	0	▲5	12.1	15.4	29,320	+8.7
Labour	67	4	0	9	▼10	6.1	17.4	33,060	–12.3
Liberal Democrats	32	1	1	0	▲1	1.5	4.1	7,775	–2.8
Independent	13	1	0	0	Steady	1.5	2.1	4,093	–1.5
SDP	1	0	0	0	Steady	0.0	<0.1	60	N/A

== Ward results ==
Election results

=== Avondale Grange ===
Avondale Grange
Party	Candidate	Votes	%
Reform	Julie Howe	376	39.0
Green	David Donoghue	222	23.0
Conservative	Robin Carter*	183	19.0
Labour	Clark Mitchell	176	18.2
Majority		154	16.0
Turnout		957	24.0
Registered electors		3,989	
Reform win (new seat)			

=== Barton Seagrave & Burton Latimer ===
Barton Seagrave & Burton Latimer (3 seats)
Party	Candidate	Votes	%
Reform	Jan O'Hara*	1,510	34.7
Reform	Maurice Elgin	1,477	34.0
Reform	Leon Gibbs	1,452	33.4
Green	Adrian Watts	1,318	30.3
Green	Gemma Harvey	1,211	27.9
Conservative	John Currall*	1,154	26.6
Conservative	Scott Edwards*	1,036	23.8
Green	Maja Raczkowska	962	22.1
Conservative	Alex Evelyn*	849	19.5
Independent	Nigel Padget	384	8.8
Liberal Democrats	Jenny Davies	378	8.7
Labour	Jane Pettit	299	6.9
Labour	Eleanor Mordecai	279	6.4
Majority		33	0.8
Turnout		4,346	33.4
Registered electors		13,027	
Reform win (new seat)			
Reform win (new seat)			
Reform win (new seat)			

=== Brickhill & Queensway ===
Brickhill & Queensway (3 seats)
Party	Candidate	Votes	%	±%
Reform	Gavin Beales	1,017	36.6	N/A
Reform	John Carvetta	951	34.2	N/A
Reform	Darren Rance	937	33.7	N/A
Conservative	Maria Alexander	717	25.8	–24.3
Labour	Sylvia Erskine	601	21.6	–13.3
Conservative	Paul Bell*	569	20.5	–26.8
Conservative	King Lawal*	532	19.1	–22.2
Labour	Scott Fitzsimmons	520	18.7	–14.2
Labour	Annia Matereke	505	18.2	–11.7
Green	Faris Ayoub	286	10.3	N/A
Independent	Allan Shipman	276	9.9	N/A
Liberal Democrats	Carolyn Ramsbottom	232	8.3	–2.6
Green	Mark Hanna	208	7.5	N/A
Green	Neil Fedorowycz	181	6.5	N/A
Turnout		2,781	24.0	–7.0
Registered electors		11,591		
Reform gain from Conservative				
Reform gain from Conservative				
Reform gain from Conservative				

=== Corby West ===
Corby West (3 seats)
Party	Candidate	Votes	%	±%
Reform	David Donnelly	1,205	42.0	N/A
Reform	Julie Lumsden	1,090	38.0	N/A
Labour	William Colquhoun	1,076	37.5	–24.7
Reform	Shay Finnegan	999	34.8	N/A
Labour	Jean Addison*	939	32.7	–29.0
Labour	Matt Keane*	844	29.4	–29.3
Conservative	Rosalie Beattie	296	10.3	–15.4
Conservative	Michael Taylor	239	8.3	–15.1
Green	Norman Bristow	237	8.3	+1.5
Green	Sara Mayer	234	8.2	N/A
Conservative	Raymond Comer	233	8.1	–14.7
Green	Michelle Slater	208	7.3	N/A
Liberal Democrats	Philip Bromhall	127	4.4	–0.1
Turnout		2,868	27.0	–9.1
Registered electors		10,611		
Reform gain from Labour				
Reform gain from Labour				
Labour hold				

=== Croyland & Swanspool ===
Croyland & Swanspool (2 seats)
Party	Candidate	Votes	%	±%
Reform	Martin Griffiths*	804	37.7	N/A
Reform	Chris Munday	707	33.2	N/A
Labour	Valerie Anslow*	599	28.1	–15.3
Labour	Victor James	500	23.5	–13.8
Conservative	Mark Jones	459	21.5	–22.8
Conservative	Viv Wilkinson	384	18.0	–24.8
Green	Paul Mannion	236	11.1	N/A
Green	Holly Moultrie	171	8.0	N/A
Liberal Democrats	Ashley Oro	128	6.0	–5.9
Turnout		2,132	25.1	–2.4
Registered electors		8,505		
Reform gain from Conservative				
Reform gain from Labour				

=== Desborough ===
Desborough (3 seats)
Party	Candidate	Votes	%	±%
Conservative	David Howes*	1,797	38.3	–12.6
Conservative	Bill McElhinney*	1,606	34.2	–15.9
Conservative	Harry Howes	1,598	34.1	–11.2
Reform	Oliver Baker	1,581	33.7	N/A
Reform	Tony Porter	1,448	30.9	N/A
Reform	Jojo Underwood	1,429	30.5	N/A
Labour	Dean Cornwall	775	16.5	–18.7
Green	Olivia Stevenson	654	13.9	+2.4
Green	Tim Jeffery	610	13.0	N/A
Labour	Neil Rielly	579	12.3	–11.9
Labour	Guy Longfoot-Finch	535	11.4	–8.6
Green	Tom Dark	390	8.3	N/A
Liberal Democrats	Alan Window	385	8.2	–4.3
SDP	Matthew Murphy	60	1.3	N/A
Turnout		4,692	38.7	+5.4
Registered electors		12,134		
Conservative hold				
Conservative hold				
Conservative hold				

=== Earls Barton ===
Earls Barton (2 seats)
Party	Candidate	Votes	%	±%
Conservative	Scott Brown*	1,138	39.0	–20.8
Conservative	Vicki Jessop	1,029	35.2	–22.7
Reform	Jonathan Coles	995	34.1	N/A
Reform	Andrew Huggett	933	32.0	N/A
Labour	Gail McDade	419	14.3	–9.8
Green	Allanah Colson	315	10.8	–16.4
Labour	Chuks Nwajei	291	10.0	N/A
Green	Pam Furness	288	9.9	N/A
Liberal Democrats	Paula Addison-Pettit	246	8.4	–14.5
Turnout		2,920	34.0	–7.8
Registered electors		8,593		
Conservative hold				
Conservative hold				

=== Finedon ===
Finedon
Party	Candidate	Votes	%	±%
Reform	Andy Sims	518	43.4	N/A
Conservative	Malcolm Ward*	357	30.0	–10.9
Labour	George Capitan	140	11.7	–24.2
Green	Sue Venables	114	9.5	–4.4
Liberal Democrats	Katherine Mayes	65	5.4	–4.0
Majority		161	13.5	N/A
Turnout		1,194	33.1	+1.7
Registered electors		3,608		
Reform gain from Conservative				

=== Geddington & Stanion ===
Geddington & Stanion
Party	Candidate	Votes	%
Reform	Brendon Lovell-Moore	638	37.4
Conservative	Mark Rowley*	417	24.4
Labour	Alan Irwin	341	20.0
Green	Andy Byatt	229	13.4
Liberal Democrats	Caroline Yeo	81	4.7
Majority		221	13.0
Turnout		1,706	39.0
Registered electors		4,376	
Reform win (new seat)			

=== Gretton & Weldon ===
Gretton & Weldon (2 seats)
Party	Candidate	Votes	%
Reform	Eddie McDonald	823	36.5
Reform	Barry O'Brien	762	33.8
Conservative	Macaulay Nichol*	698	31.0
Conservative	Kevin Watt	662	29.4
Green	Lee Forster	344	15.3
Labour	Liz Colquhoun	317	14.1
Labour	Chris Ashton	271	12.0
Green	Paul Hopkins	214	9.5
Liberal Democrats	Ian Hetherington	137	6.1
Independent	Rosie Crocker	59	2.6
Majority		61	2.7
Turnout		2,252	29.4
Registered electors		7,653	
Reform win (new seat)			
Reform win (new seat)			

=== Hatton Park ===
Hatton Park (3 seats)
Party	Candidate	Votes	%	±%
Reform	Ken Harrington*	1,397	37.5	N/A
Reform	Paul Brooke	1,286	34.5	N/A
Reform	Vinnie Whitrow	1,197	32.1	N/A
Conservative	Jon Ekins	1,144	30.7	–29.6
Conservative	Raz Koriya	947	25.4	–32.0
Conservative	Andrew Weatherill	903	24.2	–25.3
Labour	Jackie Grover	790	21.2	–7.4
Labour	Will Inskip	759	20.3	–6.9
Labour	Joshua Page	664	17.8	–4.3
Green	Duncan McIntyre	406	10.9	N/A
Green	Marnie Fedorowycz	287	7.7	N/A
Liberal Democrats	Stuart Simons	251	6.7	–2.5
Green	Ric Hyde	241	6.5	N/A
Turnout		3,730	29.8	–5.8
Registered electors		12,511		
Reform gain from Conservative				
Reform gain from Conservative				
Reform gain from Conservative				

=== Higham Ferrers ===
The election for Higham Ferrers ward was delayed due to the death of the Liberal Democrat candidate John Ratcliffe, and rescheduled to 12 June 2025. Following the re-closing of nominations, Reform UK stood three candidates in this seat despite the ward being two-member, as one of the candidates, Alan Beswick, had moved to China and could not complete the appropriate withdrawal form.

There was also an issue wherein the returning officer and the Electoral Commission had conflicting advice regarding the eligibility of one of the new Reform UK candidates, Elisa Perna. Perna had stood in the Oundle ward on 1 May 2025 and had not been elected, and she had then been nominated to the Higham Ferrers ward. The Electoral Commission stated that, as two candidates cannot stand in the same ward in a set of local elections, Perna was ineligible. However, the North Northamptonshire returning officer stated that she was eligible, as a new notice of election had been published. This raised the possibility of an election petition being launched following the result of the poll, which would end up in the High Court. The Electoral Commission's position was that under Schedule 2, Rule 12 of The Local Elections (Principal Areas) (England and Wales) Rules 2006 a candidate cannot stand in more than one electoral area, and that under the Section 39, Clause (5)(a) of the Representation of the People Act 1983, this rule also applies to any countermanded polls.

At the election on 12 June 2025, one Reform UK candidate and one Conservative Party candidate were elected.

Higham Ferrers (2 seats) (original ballot)
Party	Candidate	Votes	%	±%
Green	Tara Allston			
Conservative	John Baugh			
Reform	Alan Beswick			
Conservative	Jennie Bone*			
Independent	Jay Connolly			
Labour	Zara Cunliffe			
Reform	Mark Haddon			
Green	Gerald Kelly			
Liberal Democrats	John Ratcliffe†			
Independent	Peter Tomas			
Labour	Helen Willmott			

Higham Ferrers (2 seats) (new ballot)
Party	Candidate	Votes	%	±%
Reform	Mark Haddon	656	27.2	
Conservative	Jennie Bone*	559	23.2	
Reform	Elisa Perna	556	23.0	
Green	Gerald Kelly	529	21.9	
Conservative	John Baugh	511	21.2	
Green	Tara Allston	449	18.6	
Reform	Alan Beswick	335	13.9	
Labour	Zara Cunliffe	264	10.9	
Labour	Helen Willmott	256	10.6	
Independent	Jay Connolly	215	8.9	
Independent	Peter Tomas	187	7.7	
Liberal Democrats	Chris Nelson	165	6.8	
Majority		3	0.1	
Turnout		2414	31.1	+1.2
Registered electors		7,769		
Reform gain from Conservative				
Conservative hold				

=== Irchester ===
Irchester (3 seats)
Party	Candidate	Votes	%	±%
Conservative	Tom Partridge-Underwood*	1,429	39.4	–18.7
Conservative	Jon-Paul Carr*	1,395	38.4	–19.7
Reform	Gordon Dunsmuir	1,239	34.1	N/A
Reform	Alasdair Rodgers	1,226	33.8	N/A
Reform	Sylvia Watson	1,177	32.4	N/A
Conservative	Brian Skittrall	1,152	31.7	–19.0
Labour	Diane Boyd	495	13.6	–15.0
Labour	Kathryn Gore	458	12.6	–3.6
Green	Roy Duckles	400	11.0	+0.2
Labour	Paddy McDade	382	10.5	–4.7
Green	Emma Byatt	327	9.0	N/A
Green	Will Morris	262	7.2	N/A
Liberal Democrats	David Brown	199	5.5	–2.2
Independent	Gordon Kerr	105	2.9	N/A
Turnout		3,631	34.8	–9.5
Registered electors		10,446		
Conservative hold				
Conservative hold				
Reform gain from Conservative				

=== Irthlingborough ===
Irthlingborough (2 seats)
Party	Candidate	Votes	%	±%
Reform	Matt Davies	961	40.3	+36.1
Reform	Gregory Wilcox	883	37.0	N/A
Labour	John Farrar	590	24.7	–11.0
Conservative	Bill Cross	533	22.3	–28.1
Conservative	Adam Fernley	513	21.5	–27.6
Labour	Natalie Bloomer	512	21.5	–10.0
Green	Francis Robinson	223	9.3	–7.1
Green	Kezzabelle Ambler	189	7.9	N/A
Liberal Democrats	Susan Smith	182	7.6	+0.2
Turnout		2,386	31.2	–0.3
Registered electors		7,656		
Reform gain from Conservative				
Reform gain from Conservative				

=== Ise ===
Ise (2 seats)
Party	Candidate	Votes	%	±%
Green	Ben Jameson	1,612	46.3	+27.2
Green	Ben Williams	1,447	41.5	N/A
Reform	Jason Harris	907	26.0	N/A
Reform	Tony Webster	869	24.9	N/A
Conservative	Lloyd Bunday*	642	18.4	–36.8
Conservative	Paul Marks	514	14.8	–38.8
Labour	Martin Shepherd	261	7.5	–23.4
Labour	Charlotte Day	247	7.1	–17.0
Liberal Democrats	Ryan White	58	1.7	–8.3
Turnout		3,484	39.3	+4.8
Registered electors		8,856		
Green gain from Conservative				
Green gain from Conservative				

=== Kettering Central ===
Kettering Central (2 seats)
Party	Candidate	Votes	%
Green	Liane Robinson	1,042	45.6
Green	James Towns	922	40.3
Reform	Jonty Court	538	23.5
Reform	David Jacobs	496	21.7
Labour	Sulina Charburn	404	17.7
Labour	Elliot Prentice*	373	16.3
Conservative	Lesley Thurland	205	9.0
Conservative	Alistair Cullen	191	8.4
Liberal Democrats	Stephen Silver	84	3.7
Independent	Jehad Aburamadan	34	1.5
Majority		120	5.2
Turnout		2,286	27.0
Registered electors		8,478	
Green win (new seat)			
Green win (new seat)			

=== Kettering North ===
Kettering North (2 seats)
Party	Candidate	Votes	%
Green	Emily Fedorowycz*	1,731	56.9
Green	Dez Dell*	1,658	54.5
Reform	Nicole Ferreira	671	22.1
Reform	Paula Swift	628	20.7
Conservative	Clive Taplin	369	12.1
Conservative	Josh Pitt	329	10.8
Labour	Paul Goult	201	6.6
Labour	Anthony Wogan	145	4.8
Liberal Democrats	Nicola Howard	41	1.3
Independent	Derek Hilling	27	0.9
Majority		73	2.4
Turnout		3,041	38.1
Registered electors		7,974	
Green win (new seat)			
Green win (new seat)			

=== Kingswood ===
Kingswood (3 seats)
Party	Candidate	Votes	%	±%
Reform	Helen Campbell	1,168	43.8	N/A
Reform	Graham Cheatley	1,120	42.0	N/A
Reform	Vlaho Radin	909	34.11	N/A
Labour	Leanna Buckingham*	908	34.07	–23.0
Labour	John McGhee	888	33.3	–18.8
Labour	Zoe McGhee	764	28.7	–22.3
Conservative	Raymond Boyd	262	9.8	–15.7
Independent	Gary Campbell	218	8.2	N/A
Conservative	Bridget Watts	205	7.7	–17.4
Green	Steve Jones	191	7.2	–3.8
Green	Vivien Towns	173	6.5	N/A
Conservative	Jack Watts	161	6.0	–16.6
Green	Douglas Mayer	144	5.4	N/A
Liberal Democrats	Kay Harrison	132	5.0	–0.4
Turnout		2,665	24.1	–3.2
Registered electors		11,070		
Reform gain from Labour				
Reform gain from Labour				
Reform gain from Labour				

=== Lloyds & Corby Village ===
Lloyds and Corby Village (2 seats)
Party	Candidate	Votes	%
Labour	Mark Pengelly	981	45.1
Reform	Robert Bloom	807	37.1
Reform	Lee Duffy	794	36.5
Labour	Geri Cullen	719	33.0
Green	Sian Owens	206	9.5
Green	Sara Cosgrove	164	7.5
Conservative	Susan Watt	131	6.0
Conservative	Paul Byrne	106	4.9
Liberal Democrats	Alex Bailey	94	4.3
Majority		174	8.0
Turnout		2,177	25.3
Registered electors		8,606	
Labour win (new seat)			
Reform win (new seat)			

=== Oakley ===
Oakley (3 seats)
Party	Candidate	Votes	%	±%
Reform	Trevor Conway	1,299	37.6	N/A
Reform	Frank Kilgallon	1,162	33.6	N/A
Reform	Barry Lumsden	1,160	33.6	N/A
Labour	Simon Rielly*	986	28.5	–12.9
Labour	Lyn Buckingham*	886	25.7	–11.6
Liberal Democrats	Chris Stanbra	741	21.5	–5.6
Labour	Mary Junaid	641	18.6	–23.1
Liberal Democrats	Ceilidh Devine	555	16.1	+3.7
Conservative	Graham Lawman*	405	11.7	–21.2
Conservative	Philip Irwin*	396	11.5	–21.4
Conservative	Lora Lawman*	396	11.5	–19.7
Liberal Democrats	Alex Lock	382	11.1	–1.2
Green	Andrew Gale	320	9.3	N/A
Green	Peter Towns	186	5.4	N/A
Green	Jenny Weightman	168	4.9	N/A
Turnout		3,454	26.4	–9.1
Registered electors		13,070		
Reform gain from Labour				
Reform gain from Labour				
Reform gain from Labour				

=== Oundle ===
Oundle (3 seats)
Party	Candidate	Votes	%	±%
Conservative	Jon Humberstone	1,645	32.9	–22.6
Conservative	Helen Harrison*	1,594	31.9	–12.8
Liberal Democrats	Simon Fairhall	1,545	30.9	–0.6
Reform	Edward James	1,398	27.9	N/A
Reform	Janet Firminger	1,390	27.8	N/A
Reform	Elisa Perna	1,349	27.0	N/A
Conservative	Brett McKenna	1,312	26.2	–15.6
Labour	Jane Burns	820	16.4	–2.0
Labour	Robert Foskett	628	12.6	N/A
Labour	William Martin	588	11.8	N/A
Green	Julia Thorley	581	11.6	–5.4
Green	Sarah Welsh	483	9.7	N/A
Green	Campbell McCallum	416	8.3	N/A
Turnout		5,003	44.6	+4.1
Registered electors		11,207		
Conservative hold				
Conservative hold				
Liberal Democrats gain from Conservative				

=== Pemberton ===
Pemberton (2 seats)
Party	Candidate	Votes	%
Reform	Ash Hall	1,030	44.2
Reform	Chris McGiffen	987	42.4
Conservative	Gill Mercer*	625	26.8
Conservative	Cameron Clarke	615	26.4
Labour	Judy Caine	366	15.7
Labour	Mohammed Rahman	288	12.4
Green	Karen Seers	265	11.4
Liberal Democrats	Mark Sowinski	177	7.6
Green	JC Winton	127	5.5
Turnout		2,330	28.8
Registered electors		8,089	
Reform win (new seat)			
Reform win (new seat)			

=== Pipers Hill ===
Pipers Hill
Party	Candidate	Votes	%
Reform	Denis McLean	453	32.4
Conservative	Jonathan Smith	349	24.9
Green	Lee Watkiss	301	21.5
Labour Co-op	Richard Bowles	243	17.4
Liberal Democrats	Sabir Jones	54	3.9
Majority		104	7.5
Turnout		1,407	33.6
Registered electors		4,185	
Reform win (new seat)			

=== Raunds ===
Raunds (3 seats)
Party	Candidate	Votes	%	±%
Reform	Liz Wright	1,305	37.6	N/A
Conservative	Helen Howell*	1,266	36.4	–30.4
Reform	Kirk Harrison*	1,222	35.2	N/A
Conservative	Lee Wilkes*	1,205	34.7	–27.4
Reform	Richard Wain	1,184	34.1	N/A
Conservative	Ollie Curtis	991	28.5	–31.2
Labour	Pauline Ellis	519	14.9	–4.7
Labour	Neil Harvey	438	12.6	–4.6
Labour	Sheila Harvey	417	12.0	–4.5
Green	Sarah Tubbs*	411	11.8	–1.2
Green	Ray Zoltan	350	10.1	N/A
Liberal Democrats	Garth Ratcliffe	347	10.0	+0.2
Green	Lily Stevenson	253	7.3	N/A
Independent	Karen Blott	75	2.2	N/A
Turnout		3,475	30.8	+1.8
Registered electors		11,299		
Reform gain from Conservative				
Conservative hold				
Reform gain from Conservative				

=== Rothwell & Mawsley ===
Rothwell & Mawsley (3 seats)
Party	Candidate	Votes	%	±%
Independent	Jim Hakewill*	2,331	49.6	–2.9
Reform	Christopher Kellett	1,370	29.1	N/A
Reform	Brian Benneyworth	1,286	27.3	N/A
Conservative	Cedwien Brown*	1,253	26.6	–23.4
Reform	Diane Lowes	1,164	24.8	N/A
Conservative	Ash Davies	939	20.0	–20.3
Conservative	Cliff Moreton	847	18.0	–20.6
Green	Olivia Miller	625	13.3	–9.1
Labour	Stephen King	610	13.0	–6.7
Green	Alan Heath	531	11.3	N/A
Labour	Emily Sharman	463	9.8	–7.0
Green	Clive Thorley	375	8.0	N/A
Labour	Liam McGeown	353	7.5	N/A
Liberal Democrats	Francis Hatfull	262	5.6	N/A
Turnout		4,703	38.6	+7.6
Registered electors		12,190		
Independent hold				
Reform gain from Conservative				
Reform gain from Conservative				

=== Rushden Lakes ===
Rushden Lakes (2 seats)
Party	Candidate	Votes	%
Reform	Keith Clarke	767	44.7
Reform	Jack Goncalvez	710	41.4
Conservative	Melanie Coleman*	500	29.1
Conservative	Andy Mercer*	408	23.8
Labour	Stevie Cassidy	231	13.5
Labour	David Martin	228	13.3
Green	Mar Mannion	162	9.4
Green	Lux Williams	139	8.1
Liberal Democrats	Jason Mitchell-Bunce	117	6.8
Turnout		1,716	23.4
Registered electors		7,343	
Reform win (new seat)			
Reform win (new seat)			

=== Rushden South ===
Rushden South (2 seats)
Party	Candidate	Votes	%	±%
Conservative	Barbara Jenney*	894	37.0	–22.6
Reform	Steve Clark	867	35.9	N/A
Conservative	Steve North*	833	34.5	–22.5
Reform	John Jones	797	33.0	N/A
Labour	Gilbert Appiah	353	14.6	–12.1
Labour	Ann Wallington	332	13.8	–8.7
Green	Linda Robinson	198	8.2	–9.9
Green	Simon Colson	185	7.7	N/A
Liberal Democrats	Helga Koczwara	121	5.0	–11.2
Turnout		2,414	30.7	+7.8
Registered electors		7,860		
Conservative hold				
Reform gain from Conservative				

=== St Michael ===
St Michael
Party	Candidate	Votes	%
Green	Polly Shackleton	428	29.8
Reform	Richard Plumb	378	26.3
Labour	Philip Humphries	285	19.8
Conservative	Larry Henson*	284	19.8
Liberal Democrats	Christopher McGlynn	62	4.3
Majority		50	3.5
Turnout		1,445	35.1
Registered electors		4,117	
Green win (new seat)			

=== St Peter ===
St Peter
Party	Candidate	Votes	%
Green	Steve Geary	619	33.8
Conservative	Anup Pandey*	595	32.5
Reform	Bridget Lacey	405	22.1
Labour	Antar Zaka	133	7.3
Liberal Democrats	Judith Brown	43	2.3
Independent	Stuart Nethercott	38	2.1
Majority		24	1.3
Turnout		1,848	39.6
Registered electors		4,672	
Green win (new seat)			

=== Thrapston ===
Thrapston (3 seats)
Party	Candidate	Votes	%	±%
Reform	Joseph Garner	1,555	36.4	N/A
Conservative	Wendy Brackenbury*	1,501	35.1	–20.5
Conservative	David Brackenbury*	1,471	34.4	–16.7
Reform	Don Howard	1,403	32.8	N/A
Reform	Alastair Kirkwood	1,356	31.7	N/A
Conservative	Dorothy Maxwell*	1,100	25.8	–17.0
Green	Caroline Smith	801	18.8	+4.5
Labour	Brian Cassidy	569	13.3	–2.5
Labour	Simon Collins	553	12.9	–0.2
Labour	Eamonn Norton	466	10.9	–1.2
Green	Michael Mellors	428	10.0	N/A
Liberal Democrats	Amanda Lesre	421	9.9	+1.8
Green	Harry Winterburn	357	8.4	N/A
Independent	Anna Hawes	158	3.7	N/A
Turnout		4,271	37.0	–0.9
Registered electors		11,557		
Reform gain from Conservative				
Conservative hold				
Conservative hold				

=== Victoria ===
Victoria (2 seats)
Party	Candidate	Votes	%
Labour	Kelly Duddridge	562	27.7
Labour	David Baker	555	27.4
Conservative	Faith Hewitt	482	23.8
Conservative	Roger Powell*	423	20.9
Reform	Evie Shuttle	413	20.4
Independent	Marion Turner-Hawes	388	19.1
Reform	Samson Shuttle	371	18.3
Green	William Pedley	181	8.9
Green	Adam Cann	173	8.5
Liberal Democrats	Benjamin Harrison	128	6.3
Turnout		2,028	23.5
Registered electors		8,642	
Labour win (new seat)			
Labour win (new seat)			

== Changes 2025–2029 ==
- May 2025: Independent councillor Jim Hakewill and Liberal Democrat councillor Simon Fairhall formed the Communities Alliance group.
- August 2025: Robert Bloom (Reform UK) resigned. A by-election was held in October 2025.
- October 2025: Lee Duffy (Reform UK) won the Lloyds and Corby Village by-election.
- October 2025: Scott Brown left the Conservative group to sit as an independent.
- February 2026: Bill McElhinney left the Conservative group to sit as an independent.
- February 2026: Jennie Bone left the Conservatives and joined Reform UK.
- February 2026: Jack Goncalvez and Darren Rance left Reform UK and joined Restore Britain. Rance returned to Reform UK two days later.
- February 2026: Brown joined the Communities Alliance group.

== By-elections ==
=== Lloyds & Corby Village ===
Lloyds & Corby Village by-election: 9 October 2025
Party	Candidate	Votes	%	±%
Reform	Lee Duffy	754	38.5	+1.4
Labour	Geri Cullen	635	32.4	–12.6
Green	Lee Forster	371	18.9	+9.5
Liberal Democrats	Alex Lock	113	5.8	+1.5
Conservative	Paul Byrne	86	4.4	–1.6
Majority		119	6.1	+5.5
Turnout		1,966	22.8	–2.5
Registered electors		8,634		
Reform hold		Swing	▲7.0	

The by-election followed the resignation of Reform UK councillor Robert Bloom.

== See also ==
- North Northamptonshire Council elections
