= 2011 East Northamptonshire District Council election =

2011 UK local government election

← 2007	5 May 2011	2015 →

All 40 seats in the East Northamptonshire District Council 21 seats needed for a majority
- Turnout: 45.9%

	First party	Second party	Third party
Party	Conservative	Independent	Labour
Last election	39 seats, 59.5%	1 seat, 9.8%	0 seats, 22.3%
Seats won	35	3	2
Seat change	▼4	▲2	▲2
Popular vote	14,996	3,135	6,426
Percentage	58.1%	12.1%	24.9%
Swing	▲%	▼2.3%	▼
- Map showing the results of the 2011 East Northamptonshire District Council elections.
Council control before election
Conservative
Council control after election
Conservative

The 2011 East Northamptonshire District Council election took place on 5 May 2011 to elect members of East Northamptonshire District Council in Northamptonshire, England. This was the first election to be held under new ward boundaries. The Conservative Party retained overall control of the council.
