= 2007 East Northamptonshire District Council election =

2007 UK local government election

← 2003	3 May 2007	2011 →

All 40 seats in the East Northamptonshire District Council 21 seats needed for a majority
- Turnout: 36.9%
	First party	Second party
Party	Conservative	Independent
Last election	33 seats, 55.4%	0 seats, 6.1%
Seats won	39	1
Seat change	▲6	▲1
Popular vote	7,274	1,204
Percentage	59.5%	9.8%
Swing	▲3.6%	▲3.7%
- Map showing the results of the 2007 East Northamptonshire District Council elections.
Council control before election
Conservative
Council control after election
Conservative

The 2007 East Northamptonshire District Council election took place on 3 May 2007 to elect members of East Northamptonshire District Council in Northamptonshire, England. The polls place on the same day as other local elections across the UK. This was the first election to be held under new ward boundaries. The Conservative Party retained overall control of the council, while the Labour Party was wiped out, with a single Independent councillor providing the sole opposition on the council.
