= 1991 East Northamptonshire District Council election =

1991 UK local government election

| ← 1987 | 2 May 1991 | 1995 → |

All 36 seats in the East Northamptonshire District Council 19 seats needed for a majority
- Turnout: 53.6%
| | First party | Second party | Third party |
|---|---|---|---|
| Party | Conservative | Labour | Liberal Democrats |
| Seats won | 23 | 9 | 3 |
| Seat change | ▼7 | ▲4 | ▲2 |
| Popular vote | 12,173 | 8,143 | 5,163 |
| Percentage | 43.7% | 28.9% | 18.3% |
| | Fourth party |
| Party | Independent |
| Seats won | 1 |
| Seat change | ▲1 |
| Popular vote | 2,503 |
| Percentage | 9.2% |
- Map showing the results of the 1991 East Northamptonshire District Council elections.
Council control before election
Conservative
Council control after election
Conservative

The 1991 East Northamptonshire District Council election took place on 2 May 1991 to elect members of East Northamptonshire District Council in Northamptonshire, England. This was on the same day as other local elections. This was the first election to be held under new ward boundaries. The Conservative Party retained overall control of the council which it had held since the council's creation in 1973.

== Ward-by-Ward Results ==
=== Barnwell Ward (1 seat) ===
East Northamptonshire District Council Elections 1991: Barnwell
| Party | Candidate | Votes | % |
|---|---|---|---|
| Liberal Democrats | J. Brown | 335 | |
| Conservative | J. Fowles | 306 | |
| Labour | D. Maughan | 45 | |
| Turnout | | | 64.8% |
| Liberal Democrats gain from Conservative | | | |

=== Brigstock Ward (1 seat) ===
East Northamptonshire District Council Elections 1991: Brigstock
| Party | Candidate | Votes | % |
|---|---|---|---|
| Conservative | J. Chudley | 440 | |
| Liberal Democrats | J. Smoker | 305 | |
| Turnout | | | 68.0% |
| Conservative gain from Liberal Democrats | | | |

=== Drayton Ward (1 seat) ===
East Northamptonshire District Council Elections 1991: Drayton
| Party | Candidate | Votes | % |
|---|---|---|---|
| Conservative | R. Clifton | 328 | |
| Liberal Democrats | J. Lawrence | 303 | |
| Turnout | | | 52.2% |
| Conservative hold | | | |

=== Forest Ward (1 seat) ===
East Northamptonshire District Council Elections 1991: Forest
| Party | Candidate | Votes | % |
|---|---|---|---|
| Independent | M.Glithero | 557 | |
| Liberal Democrats | F. Ledner | 154 | |
| Turnout | | | 57.6% |
| Independent gain from Conservative | | | |

=== Higham Ferriers Ward (3 seats) ===
East Northamptonshire District Council Elections 1991: Higham Ferriers
| Party | Candidate | Votes | % |
|---|---|---|---|
| Conservative | G. Murdin | 1,269 | |
| Conservative | D. Lawson | 1,070 | |
| Conservative | H. Binder | 1,036 | |
| Independent | R. Gell | 863 | |
| Labour | G. Moore | 795 | |
| Labour | B. Elgood | 679 | |
| Labour | P. Gadsby | 678 | |
| Liberal Democrats | D. Brown | 185 | |
| Turnout | | | 53.3% |
| Conservative hold | | | |
| Conservative hold | | | |
| Conservative hold | | | |

=== Irthlingborough Ward (3 seats) ===
East Northamptonshire District Council Elections 1991: Irthlingborough
| Party | Candidate | Votes | % |
|---|---|---|---|
| Conservative | E. McGibbon | 1,260 | |
| Conservative | P. Brightwell | 1,168 | |
| Labour | W. Howlett | 1,138 | |
| Labour | R. Nightingale | 1,000 | |
| Labour | D. Copple | 819 | |
| Conservative | C. Hill | 811 | |
| Liberal Democrats | C. Nightingale | 386 | |
| Turnout | | | 49.7% |
| Conservative hold | | | |
| Conservative hold | | | |
| Labour hold | | | |

=== Kings Cliffe Ward (1 seat) ===
East Northamptonshire District Council Elections 1991: Kings Cliffe
| Party | Candidate | Votes | % |
|---|---|---|---|
| Liberal Democrats | I. Hetherington | 304 | |
| Conservative | G. Wagstaffe | 241 | |
| Independent | S. Dalzell | 50 | |
| Turnout | | | 68.5% |
| Liberal Democrats gain from Conservative | | | |

=== Lower Nene Ward (1 seat) ===
East Northamptonshire District Council Elections 1991: Lower Nene
| Party | Candidate | Votes | % |
|---|---|---|---|
| Conservative | P. Banbridge | 418 | |
| Liberal Democrats | D. Brown | 121 | |
| Labour | M. Whiteman | 108 | |
| Turnout | | | 60.4% |
| Conservative hold | | | |

=== Margaret Beaufort Ward (1 seat) ===
East Northamptonshire District Council Elections 1991: Margaret Beaufort
| Party | Candidate | Votes | % |
|---|---|---|---|
| Conservative | H. Gregory | 449 | |
| Labour | W. Gill | 77 | |
| Liberal Democrats | T. Butters | 70 | |
| Turnout | | | 52.9% |
| Conservative hold | | | |

=== Oundle Ward (2 seats) ===
East Northamptonshire District Council Elections 1991: Oundle
| Party | Candidate | Votes | % |
|---|---|---|---|
| Liberal Democrats | M. Roffe | 913 | |
| Conservative | P. Brudenell | 907 | |
| Liberal Democrats | E. Gahan | 689 | |
| Conservative | D. Lee | 661 | |
| Labour | R. Whitehead | 253 | |
| Labour | B. Glaysher | 185 | |
| Turnout | | | 58.1% |
| Liberal Democrats gain from Conservative | | | |
| Conservative hold | | | |

=== Raunds Ward (3 seats) ===
East Northamptonshire District Council Elections 1991: Raunds
| Party | Candidate | Votes | % |
|---|---|---|---|
| Conservative | J. Chatburn | 1,198 | |
| Labour | M. Roberts | 1,170 | |
| Conservative | A. Campbell | 1,167 | |
| Conservative | P. Chantrell | 1,156 | |
| Labour | N. Harvey | 1,032 | |
| Labour | S. Allen | 907 | |
| Liberal Democrats | C. Dorks | 457 | |
| Turnout | | | 46.6% |
| Conservative hold | | | |
| Labour gain from Conservative | | | |
| Conservative hold | | | |

=== Ringstead Ward (1 seat) ===
East Northamptonshire District Council Elections 1991: Ringstead
| Party | Candidate | Votes | % |
|---|---|---|---|
| Conservative | M. Peacock | 477 | |
| Labour | B. McGeorge | 298 | |
| Liberal Democrats | S. Beecroft | 81 | |
| Turnout | | | 57.9% |
| Conservative hold | | | |

=== Rushden East Ward (3 seats) ===
East Northamptonshire District Council Elections 1991: Rushden East
| Party | Candidate | Votes | % |
|---|---|---|---|
| Labour | E. Dicks | 1,207 | |
| Labour | A. Mantle | 883 | |
| Labour | L. Rolfe | 782 | |
| Conservative | Leigh D. | 465 | |
| Conservative | R. Pinnock | 431 | |
| Turnout | | | 40.3% |
| Labour hold | | | |
| Labour hold | | | |
| Labour hold | | | |

=== Rushden North Ward (3 seats) ===
East Northamptonshire District Council Elections 1991: Rushden North
| Party | Candidate | Votes | % |
|---|---|---|---|
| Conservative | C. Wood | 848 | |
| Conservative | B.Catlin | 823 | |
| Conservative | J. Gay | 765 | |
| Labour | C. Williams | 716 | |
| Liberal Democrats | P. Dent | 625 | |
| Liberal Democrats | R. Ramsey | 501 | |
| Turnout | | | 39.1% |
| Conservative hold | | | |
| Conservative hold | | | |
| Conservative hold | | | |

=== Rushden South Ward (3 seats) ===
East Northamptonshire District Council Elections 1991: Rushden South
| Party | Candidate | Votes | % |
|---|---|---|---|
| Conservative | G. Osborne | 1,016 | |
| Conservative | G. Evelyn | 978 | |
| Labour | P. Wix | 726 | |
| Independent | J. Wheal | 680 | |
| Labour | M. Clayton | 645 | |
| Labour | S. Lawrence | 589 | |
| Liberal Democrats | B. Noble | 409 | |
| Liberal Democrats | P. Rossi | 362 | |
| Liberal Democrats | S. Henderson | 311 | |
| Turnout | | | 38.5% |
| Conservative hold | | | |
| Conservative hold | | | |
| Labour gain from Conservative | | | |

=== Rushden West Ward (3 seats) ===
East Northamptonshire District Council Elections 1991: Rushden West
| Party | Candidate | Votes | % |
|---|---|---|---|
| Labour | M. Batty | 862 | |
| Labour | E. Sampson | 761 | |
| Labour | R. Batty | 830 | |
| Conservative | E. Carmichael | 809 | |
| Conservative | J. Stott-Everett | 801 | |
| Conservative | K. Sulphur | 676 | |
| Turnout | | | 41.6% |
| Labour gain from Conservative | | | |
| Labour gain from Conservative | | | |
| Labour gain from Conservative | | | |

=== Stanwick Ward (1 seat) ===
East Northamptonshire District Council Elections 1991: Stanwick
| Party | Candidate | Votes | % |
|---|---|---|---|
| Conservative | P. Macgovern | 404 | |
| Independent | F. Linden-Wyatt | 293 | |
| Turnout | | | 41.5% |
| Conservative hold | | | |

=== Thrapston Ward (2 seats) ===
East Northamptonshire District Council Elections 1991: Thrapston
| Party | Candidate | Votes | % |
|---|---|---|---|
| Conservative | J. Bunyan | 659 | |
| Conservative | J. Whitham | 570 | |
| Labour | J. Hill | 375 | |
| Labour | I. Byrnes | 368 | |
| Liberal Democrats | P. Claxton | 248 | |
| Liberal Democrats | F. Hudd | 161 | |
| Turnout | | | 41.5% |
| Conservative hold | | | |
| Conservative hold | | | |

=== Willibrook Ward (1 seat) ===
East Northamptonshire District Council Elections 1991: Willibrook
| Party | Candidate | Votes | % |
|---|---|---|---|
| Conservative | J. Richardson | 404 | |
| Liberal Democrats | P. Parker | 249 | |
| Labour | N. Hall | 100 | |
| Turnout | | | 66.2% |
| Conservative hold | | | |

=== Woodford Ward (1 seat) ===
East Northamptonshire District Council Elections 1991: Woodford
| Party | Candidate | Votes | % |
|---|---|---|---|
| Conservative | F. Cullum | 275 | |
| Labour | J. Peacock | 223 | |
| Turnout | | | 62.2% |
| Conservative gain from Labour | | | |
