= 2021 North Northamptonshire Council election =

2021 UK local government election

- 6 May 2021

All 78 seats to North Northamptonshire Council 40 seats needed for a majority
	First party	Second party
Party	Conservative	Labour
Seats won	60	14
Popular vote	124,497	70,064
Percentage	52.8%	29.7%
	Third party	Fourth party
Party	Green	Independent
Seats won	3	1
Popular vote	15,771	8,465
Percentage	6.7%	3.6%
- Winner of each seat at the 2021 North Northamptonshire Council election
Leader after election
Jason Smithers
Conservative

The 2021 North Northamptonshire Council election took place alongside nationwide local elections. The election was originally due to take place in May 2020, but was postponed due to the COVID-19 pandemic.

It was the inaugural election for the unitary authority, which was created one month before in April 2021, after the merger of the four existing non-metropolitan districts of Corby, East Northamptonshire, Kettering, and Wellingborough. North Northamptonshire absorbed the functions of these districts, plus those of the abolished Northamptonshire County Council. All 26 wards elect 3 councillors each, resulting in 78 councillors being elected and 40 seats being required for a majority.

== Summary ==
=== Election result ===
2021 North Northamptonshire Council election
Party	Candidates	Seats	Gains	Losses	Net gain/loss	Seats %	Votes %	Votes	+/−
Conservative	78	60	N/A	N/A	N/A	76.9	52.8	124,497	N/A
Labour	67	14	N/A	N/A	N/A	17.9	29.7	70,064	N/A
Green	20	3	N/A	N/A	N/A	3.8	6.7	15,771	N/A
Independent	13	1	N/A	N/A	N/A	1.3	3.6	8,465	N/A
Liberal Democrats	31	0	N/A	N/A	N/A	0.0	6.9	16,349	N/A
Reform	3	0	N/A	N/A	N/A	0.0	0.2	498	N/A
Alliance for Democracy and Freedom (UK)	1	0	N/A	N/A	N/A	0.0	<0.1	100	N/A

== Results by Division ==
Divisions here are sectioned by the area that formerly constituted their district councils.

=== Corby ===
Corby Rural
Party	Candidate	Votes	%
Conservative	David John Sims	1,955	57.6
Conservative	Kevin Gordon Sydney	1,888	55.6
Conservative	Macaulay Andrew Nichol	1,857	54.7
Labour	Ann Wallington	1,506	44.3
Labour	Ray Beeby	1,376	40.5
Labour	Guy Longfoot-Finch	1,102	32.4
Green	Stevie Jones	484	14.3
Liberal Democrats	Judith Ann Brown	341	10.0
Turnout		3,396	40.2

Corby West
Party	Candidate	Votes	%
Labour	Jean Gloria Addison	2,062	62.2
Labour	Alison Dalziel	2,044	61.7
Labour	Matt Keane	1,946	58.7
Conservative	Rosalie Susan Beattie	853	25.7
Conservative	Glenvil Greenwood-Smith	776	23.4
Conservative	Peter Wathen	754	22.8
Green	Lynne Scannell	225	6.8
Liberal Democrats	Philip Charles Bromhall	149	4.5
Turnout		3,313	36.1

Kingswood
Party	Candidate	Votes	%
Labour	John Adam McGhee	1,619	57.1
Labour	Zoe Catherine McGhee	1,477	52.1
Labour	Peter Welsh McEwan	1,447	51.0
Conservative	Ray Boyd	724	25.5
Conservative	Raymond George Jackson	711	25.1
Conservative	Robert John Tustin	642	22.6
Green	Michael Mahon	312	11.0
Liberal Democrats	James Edward McGeown	153	5.4
Turnout		2,835	27.3

Lloyds
Party	Candidate	Votes	%
Labour	Mark Pengelly	2,338	70.5
Labour	Lyn Buckingham	2,212	66.7
Labour	William George Colquhoun	1,852	55.8
Conservative	Cameron Steven Andrew Clarke	783	23.6
Conservative	Jayden Watts	691	20.8
Conservative	Cesare Marinaro	642	19.3
Green	Lee Forster	491	14.8
Liberal Democrats	Terri Meechan	162	4.9
Turnout		3,318	33.6

Oakley
Party	Candidate	Votes	%
Labour	Ross Armour	1,491	41.7
Labour	Simon Rielly	1,482	41.4
Labour	Leanne Norma Louise Buckingham	1,334	37.3
Conservative	Lorna Michele Rowan Garner	1,177	32.9
Conservative	Ollie Curtis	1,176	32.9
Conservative	Alexandra Katharine Wellings	1,116	31.2
Liberal Democrats	Chris Stanbra	969	27.1
Liberal Democrats	Penny Smith	444	12.4
Liberal Democrats	Aidan O'Donovan	439	12.3
Turnout		3,576	35.5

=== East Northamptonshire ===
Higham Ferrers
Party	Candidate	Votes	%
Conservative	Bert Jackson	1,854	56.0
Conservative	Jennie Bone	1,683	50.8
Conservative	Harriet Jane Frances Pentland	1,681	50.8
Independent	Richard Joseph Gell	708	21.4
Labour	Judy Dorothy Caine	636	19.2
Labour	David Leslie Baker	613	18.5
Independent	Peter Tomas	587	17.7
Green	Marnie Fedorowycz	487	14.7
Liberal Democrats	David Hooton	405	12.2
Reform	Sean Robert John Lever	149	4.5
Turnout		3,311	29.9

Irthlingborough
Party	Candidate	Votes	%
Conservative	Dorothy Maxwell	1,817	50.4
Conservative	Kirk William Oliver Harrison	1,770	49.1
Conservative	Roger Stuart Powell	1,763	48.9
Labour	Caroline Cross	1,288	35.7
Labour	Jon Gray	1,137	31.5
Labour	Caroline Smith	788	21.8
Green	Joel Wylie	590	16.4
Liberal Democrats	Susan Smith	267	7.4
Reform	Matt Davies	151	4.2
Turnout		3,607	31.5

Oundle
Party	Candidate	Votes	%
Conservative	Annabel Lucy de Capell Brooke	2,831	55.5
Conservative	Helen Jane Harrison	2,281	44.7
Conservative	Jason Smithers	2,133	41.8
Liberal Democrats	Charlie Best	1,606	31.5
Liberal Democrats	Caroline Campbell Yeo	1,212	23.8
Labour	Harry Edward James	936	18.4
Green	Luke Jones	867	17.0
Independent	Peter David Peel	283	5.6
Independent	Phillip Maynard Stearn	217	4.3
Turnout		5,099	40.5

Raunds
Party	Candidate	Votes	%
Conservative	Helen Victoria Mary Howell	2,095	66.8
Conservative	Richard John Kenneth Levell	1,949	62.1
Conservative	Lee Robert Charles Wilkes	1,873	59.7
Labour	Pauline Mary Ellis	614	19.6
Labour	Neil Harvey	540	17.2
Labour	Sheila Elizabeth Harvey	519	16.5
Green	Julia Thorley	408	13.0
Liberal Democrats	Garth Ratcliffe	307	9.8
Turnout		3,136	29.0

Rushden Pemberton West
Party	Candidate	Votes	%
Conservative	Barbara Jenney	1,981	63.5
Conservative	Michael Tye	1,943	62.2
Conservative	Gill Mercer	1,766	56.6
Labour	Gail McDade	687	22.0
Labour	Gary Hugh Day	666	21.3
Liberal Democrats	Joe Norris	581	18.6
Green	Grace Siddington	530	17.0
Turnout		3,122	28.2

Rushden South
Party	Candidate	Votes	%
Conservative	David Jenney	1,894	59.6
Conservative	Steven John Brian North	1,810	57.0
Conservative	Andy Mercer	1,680	52.9
Labour	Les Rolfe	849	26.7
Labour	Daniel James Ash	714	22.5
Green	Keiron Farrow	575	18.1
Liberal Democrats	Liam Wilson	514	16.2
Turnout		3,177	22.9

Thrapston
Party	Candidate	Votes	%
Conservative	Wendy Jane Brackenbury	2,746	55.6
Conservative	David Hereward Gibson Brackenbury	2,526	51.1
Conservative	Geoff Shacklock	2,117	42.8
Independent	Val Carter	1,712	34.6
Labour	Paul George Kirkpatrick	782	15.8
Green	Hope Carpenter	708	14.3
Labour	Jerry Hawkins	647	13.1
Labour	Taffy Chikoto	599	12.1
Liberal Democrats	Jack Duckworth	398	8.1
Independent	John Allan Smoker	370	7.5
Liberal Democrats	Iris Amanda Lerse	349	7.1
Turnout		4,943	37.9

=== Kettering ===
Burton and Broughton
Party	Candidate	Votes	%
Conservative	Jan O'Hara	1,543	49.2
Conservative	John Richard Currall	1,541	49.1
Conservative	Chris Smith-Haynes	1,120	35.7
Green	Adrian Watts	1,004	32.0
Liberal Democrats	Chris Groome	920	29.3
Liberal Democrats	Jenny Davies	786	25.0
Independent	Fergus Macdonald	598	19.1
Labour	Mark Anthony Sales	519	16.5
Turnout		3,139	27.5

Clover Hill
Party	Candidate	Votes	%
Green	Dez Dell	2,184	59.8
Green	Emily-Rose Fedorowycz	1,780	48.7
Green	Sarah Tubbs	1,726	47.3
Conservative	Lesley Anne Thurland	1,087	29.8
Conservative	Ash Davies	1,002	27.4
Conservative	Greg Titcombe	887	24.3
Independent	Bill Parker	480	13.1
Labour	Bryan Bremner Massie	442	12.1
Labour	Martyn Reuby	355	9.7
Independent	Derek Hilling	120	3.3
ADF	Suzanne Brogan	100	2.7
Turnout		3,652	37.1

Desborough
Party	Candidate	Votes	%
Conservative	Mike Tebbutt	2,011	50.9
Conservative	Mark Robert Dearing	1,981	50.1
Conservative	David Alexander Howes	1,791	45.3
Labour	Phil Sawford	1,393	35.2
Labour	Andy Coleman	956	24.2
Labour	Yvonne Claire Scarrott	791	20.0
Independent	Linda Valerie Burnham	707	17.9
Liberal Democrats	Alan James Window	493	12.5
Green	Stevie Lawless	455	11.5
Turnout		3,954	33.3

Ise
Party	Candidate	Votes	%
Conservative	Lloyd Bunday	1,871	55.2
Conservative	Mark Edward Rowley	1,817	53.6
Conservative	Elliot Keith Prentice	1,731	51.1
Labour	John David Padwick	1,048	30.9
Labour	Jane Pettit	816	24.1
Labour	Tim Sharman	652	19.2
Green	David Lomasney	647	19.1
Liberal Democrats	Ryan James White	338	10.0
Turnout		3,390	34.5

Northall
Party	Candidate	Votes	%
Conservative	Kevin Nigel Thurland	1,394	42.9
Conservative	Anup Kumar Pandey	1,392	42.9
Conservative	Ian Frederick Jelley	1,326	40.8
Labour	Keli Ryan Watts	1,309	40.3
Labour	Andy Byatt	1,249	38.5
Labour	Clare Patricia Meechan Pavitt	1,107	34.1
Liberal Democrats	Stephen Michael Silver	439	13.5
Turnout		3,247	26.6

Rothwell and Mawsley
Party	Candidate	Votes	%
Independent	Jim Hakewill	1,940	52.5
Conservative	Cedwien Margaret Brown	1,847	50.0
Conservative	Joseph John Smyth	1,489	40.3
Conservative	Cliff Moreton	1,424	38.6
Green	Sarah Musselwhite	827	22.4
Labour	Isobel Victoria Stevenson	726	19.7
Labour	Robert Charles Newby	620	16.8
Turnout		3,693	31.0

Wicksteed
Party	Candidate	Votes	%
Conservative	Scott Anthony Edwards	1,695	47.3
Conservative	Russell Roberts	1,621	45.3
Conservative	Larry Henson	1,504	42.0
Liberal Democrats	Andrew Rivers George Dutton	970	27.1
Labour	Adam Balmer	819	22.9
Labour	Geoff Marshall	814	22.7
Labour	Kat Ivanova	799	22.3
Liberal Democrats	Christopher George McGlynn	760	21.2
Liberal Democrats	Chris Nelson	590	16.5
Reform	Jehad Soliman Aburamadan	198	5.5
Turnout		3,582	31.7

Windmill
Party	Candidate	Votes	%
Conservative	Robin John Carter	1,184	48.0
Labour	Anne Marie B Lee	1,068	43.3
Conservative	Paul Marks	1,037	42.0
Conservative	Craig Skinner	1,014	41.1
Labour	Clark James Mitchell	915	37.1
Labour	Arlette Cindy Wrighting	915	37.1
Independent	Glenn Binley	186	7.5
Liberal Democrats	Mel Gosliga	185	7.5
Turnout		2,467	24.6

=== Wellingborough ===
Brickhill and Queensway
Party	Candidate	Votes	%
Conservative	Paul Anthony Bell	1,455	50.1
Conservative	Matt Binley	1,374	47.3
Conservative	King Babatunda Oloruntoba Adeboye Lawal	1,199	41.3
Labour	Adam William Henley	1,015	34.9
Labour	Sylvia Rosetta Erskine	956	32.9
Labour	Andrea Jayne Watts	868	29.9
Liberal Democrats	Carolyn Frances Ramsbottom	316	10.9
Turnout		2,906	31.0

Croyland and Swanspool
Party	Candidate	Votes	%
Conservative	Tim Allebone	1,204	44.3
Labour	Valerie Frances Anslow	1,180	43.4
Conservative	Philip Todd Irwin	1,162	42.8
Labour	Samuel Lewis Shoesmith	1,012	37.3
Conservative	Brian Kevin Skittrall	998	36.7
Labour	Andrew Michael Julian Scarborough	988	36.4
Liberal Democrats	Neale Robert William McMaster	323	11.9
Turnout		2,716	27.5

Earls Barton
Party	Candidate	Votes	%
Conservative	Clive Frederick Hallam	2,551	59.8
Conservative	Scott Phillip Brown	2,468	57.9
Conservative	Lora Lawman	2,440	57.2
Green	Olivia Mitchell	1,160	27.2
Labour	Ian Peter Stroud	1,028	24.1
Liberal Democrats	Paula Jane Addison-Pettit	976	22.9
Turnout		4,266	41.8

Finedon
Party	Candidate	Votes	%
Conservative	Jonathan Ekins	1,491	44.5
Conservative	Malcolm John Seeney Ward	1,457	43.5
Conservative	Andrew James Weatherill	1,424	42.5
Labour	Tony Aslam	1,314	39.3
Labour	Elayne Francis	1,096	32.7
Labour	Anthony David Dady	1,017	30.4
Green	Sarah Pearson	508	15.2
Liberal Democrats	John George Ramsbottom	345	10.3
Turnout		3,347	31.4

Hatton Park
Party	Candidate	Votes	%
Conservative	Ken Harrington	2,137	59.5
Conservative	Graham Michael Lawman	2,062	57.4
Conservative	Malcolm Waters	1,778	49.5
Labour	Clare Margaret Anne Thomson	1,029	28.6
Labour	William Inskip	976	27.2
Labour	Stuart George Scott	793	22.1
Liberal Democrats	Stuart James Simons	332	9.2
Turnout		3,592	35.6

Irchester
Party	Candidate	Votes	%
Conservative	Jon-Paul Carr	2,108	58.1
Conservative	Tom Partridge-Underwood	2,105	58.1
Conservative	Martin James Griffiths	1,837	50.7
Labour	Tim Maguire	1,037	28.6
Labour	Michele Anne Milroy	587	16.2
Independent	Jo Beirne	577	15.9
Labour	John Edward Farrar	552	15.2
Green	Will Morris	393	10.8
Liberal Democrats	David Michael Brown	280	7.7
Turnout		3,626	44.3

== Changes 2021–2025 ==
- 2021: Martin Griffiths left the Conservatives to sit as an independent.
- December 2021: Annabel de Capell Brooke (Conservative) resigned, with a by-election held in February 2022.
- February 2022: Charlie Best (Liberal Democrats) gained the Oundle seat from the Conservatives.
- November 2022: Kevin Thurland (Conservative) died, with a by-election held in February 2023.
- December 2022: David Jenney (Conservative) died, with a by-election held in March 2023.
- February 2023: Keli Watts (Labour) gained the Northall seat from the Conservatives.
- March 2023: Melanie Coleman (Conservative) held the Rushden South seat for her party.
- May 2023: David Sims left the Conservatives and joined Labour.
- January 2024: Mike Tebbutt (Conservative) died, with a by-election held in April 2024.
- March 2024: Cedwien Brown and Joseph Smyth left the Conservatives to sit as independents; Elliot Prentice left the Conservatives and joined Labour.
- April 2024: William McElhinney (Conservative) held the Desborough seat for his party.
- August 2024: Chris Smith-Haynes (Conservative) was disqualified for non-attendance after ill health prevented him from attending meetings, with a by-election held in October 2024; Ross Armour was suspended from Labour.
- October 2024: Alex Evelyn (Conservative) held the Burton and Broughton seat for his party.
- December 2024: Ross Armour, then sitting as an independent, resigned and the seat was left vacant until the 2025 election; Martin Griffiths (independent) and Ken Harrington (Conservative) joined Reform UK.
- January 2025: Charlie Best (Liberal Democrats) resigned and the seat was left vacant until the 2025 election; Cedwien Brown rejoined the Conservatives; Matt Binley was suspended from the Conservatives.
- March 2025: Kirk Harrison and Jan O'Hara left the Conservatives and joined Reform UK.

== By-elections ==
=== Oundle ===
Oundle by-election, 17 February 2022
Party	Candidate	Votes	%	±%
Liberal Democrats	Charlie Best	1,683	47.2	+24.3
Conservative	Ollie Curtis	1,423	39.9	−18.8
Labour	Harry James	337	9.4	+1.9
Green	Kate Jones	124	3.5	−3.5
Majority		260	7.3	N/A
Turnout		3,567	35.5	−5.0
Liberal Democrats gain from Conservative		Swing	21.6	

The by-election followed the resignation of Conservative councillor Annabel de Capell Brooke.

=== Northall ===
Northall by-election, 2 February 2023
Party	Candidate	Votes	%	±%
Labour	Keli Watts	1,027	38.0	−6.6
Conservative	Lesley Thurland	805	29.8	−20.3
Green	Ria Skelton	658	24.4	N/A
Liberal Democrats	Stephen Silver	127	4.7	−0.6
Reform	Jehad Aburamadan	85	3.1	N/A
Majority		222	8.2	N/A
Turnout		2,702	25.7	−0.9
Labour gain from Conservative		Swing	6.9	

The by-election followed the death of Conservative councillor Kevin Thurland.

=== Rushden South ===
Rushden South by-election, 23 March 2023
Party	Candidate	Votes	%	±%
Conservative	Anne Melanie Coleman	1,210	54.6	−12.4
Labour	Chris Ashton	638	28.8	+9.3
Liberal Democrats	Blythe Cassandra Avery	157	7.1	+0.7
Breakthrough Party	Dave Merlane	120	5.4	N/A
Green	Will Morris	93	4.2	−3.0
Majority		572	25.8	
Turnout		2,218	19.3	−3.6
Conservative hold		Swing		

The by-election followed the death of Conservative councillor David Jenney.

=== Desborough ===
Desborough by-election, 4 April 2024
Party	Candidate	Votes	%	±%
Conservative	Bill McElhinney	1,485	47.3	−7.4
Labour	Richard Tod	1,054	33.6	+3.9
Green	Olivia Stevenson	368	11.7	+7.4
Liberal Democrats	Alan Window	234	7.4	+2.8
Majority		431	13.7	
Turnout		3,141	29.9	−3.4
Conservative hold		Swing		

The by-election followed the death of Conservative councillor Mike Tebbutt.

=== Burton and Broughton ===
Burton and Broughton by-election, 10 October 2024
Party	Candidate	Votes	%	±%
Conservative	Alex Evelyn	939	46.4	−6.0
Green	Adrian Watts	489	24.1	+11.6
Liberal Democrats	Jenny Davies	337	16.6	−4.6
Labour	Nigel Padget	260	12.8	+6.4
Majority		450	22.2	
Turnout		2,025	20.4	−7.1
Conservative hold				

The by-election followed the disqualification of Conservative councillor Chris Smith-Haynes for non-attendance after ill health prevented him from attending meetings.
