= 2003 East Northamptonshire District Council election =

2003 UK local government election

← 1999	1 May 2003	2007 →

All 36 seats in the East Northamptonshire District Council 19 seats needed for a majority
- Turnout: 34.3%
	First party	Second party
Party	Conservative	Labour
Last election	20 seats, 51.8%	15 seats, 43.3%
Seats won	33	3
Seat change	▲13	▼12
Popular vote	9,724	5,671
Percentage	55.4%	32.3%
Swing	▲3.6%	▼11.0%
- Map showing the results of the 2003 East Northamptonshire District Council elections.
Council control before election
Conservative
Council control after election
Conservative

The 2003 East Northamptonshire District Council election took place on 1 May 2003 to elect members of East Northamptonshire District Council in Northamptonshire, England. This was the first election to be held under new ward boundaries. The Conservative Party retained overall control of the council.
