= 1999 East Northamptonshire District Council election =

1999 UK local government election

| ← 1995 | 6 May 1999 | 2003 → |

All 36 seats in the East Northamptonshire District Council 19 seats needed for a majority
- Turnout: 39.2%

| | First party | Second party | Third party |
|---|---|---|---|
| Party | Conservative | Labour | Independent |
| Last election | 9 seats, 37.6% | 25 seats, 46.4% | 0 seats, 8.8% |
| Seats won | 20 | 15 | 1 |
| Seat change | ▲11 | ▼10 | ▲1 |
| Popular vote | 9,920 | 8,288 | 941 |
| Percentage | 51.8% | 43.3% | 4.9% |
| Swing | ▲14.2% | ▼3.1% | ▼3.9% |
- Map showing the results of the 1999 East Northamptonshire District Council elections.
Council control before election
Labour
Council control after election
Conservative

The 1999 East Northamptonshire District Council election took place on 6 May 1999 to elect members of East Northamptonshire District Council in Northamptonshire, England. This was on the same day as other local elections. This was the first election to be held under new ward boundaries. The Conservative Party regained overall control of the council from the Labour Party, which it had lost at the previous election in 1995.

== Ward-by-Ward Results ==
=== Barnwell Ward (1 seat) ===
East Northamptonshire District Council Elections 1999: Barnwell
| Party | Candidate | Votes | % |
|---|---|---|---|
| Conservative | S. North | 478 | |
| Labour | B. Silk | 220 | |
| Turnout | | | 46.1% |

=== Dryden Ward (1 seat) ===
East Northamptonshire District Council Elections 1999: Dryden
| Party | Candidate | Votes | % |
|---|---|---|---|
| Conservative | D. Scott | 446 | |
| Labour | D. Thompson | 295 | |
| Turnout | | | 50.8% |

=== Fineshade Ward (1 seat) ===
East Northamptonshire District Council Elections 1999: Fineshade
| Party | Candidate | Votes | % |
|---|---|---|---|
| Conservative | J. Stannage | | |

=== Higham Ferriers Ward (3 seats) ===
East Northamptonshire District Council Elections 1999: Higham Ferriers
| Party | Candidate | Votes | % |
|---|---|---|---|
| Conservative | A. Sauntson | 880 | |
| Independent | R. Gell | 858 | |
| Labour | G. Moore | 851 | |
| Conservative | P. Whiting | 708 | |
| Labour | A. Dunn | 700 | |
| Labour | S. Moore | 699 | |
| Conservative | T. James | 666 | |
| Turnout | | | 40.5% |

=== Irthlingborough Ward (3 seats) ===
East Northamptonshire District Council Elections 1999: Irthlingborough
| Party | Candidate | Votes | % |
|---|---|---|---|
| Labour | R. Nightingale | 1,043 | |
| Labour | A. Packham | 1,011 | |
| Labour | J. Farrar | 984 | |
| Conservative | I. Ferris | 847 | |
| Conservative | D. Chappell | 701 | |
| Conservative | J. Mander | 682 | |
| Turnout | | | 37.0% |

=== Kings Forest Ward (1 seat) ===
East Northamptonshire District Council Elections 1999: Kings Forest
| Party | Candidate | Votes | % |
|---|---|---|---|
| Conservative | M. Githero | | |

=== Lower Nene Ward (1 seat) ===
East Northamptonshire District Council Elections 1999: Lower Nene
| Party | Candidate | Votes | % |
|---|---|---|---|
| Conservative | P. Banbridge | 491 | |
| Labour | D. Crawley | 193 | |
| Turnout | | | 48.5% |

=== Lyveden Ward (1 seat) ===
East Northamptonshire District Council Elections 1999: Lyveden
| Party | Candidate | Votes | % |
|---|---|---|---|
| Conservative | J. Chudley | 601 | |
| Labour | K. Draycott | 134 | |
| Turnout | | | 57.8% |

=== Oundle Ward (2 seats) ===
East Northamptonshire District Council Elections 1999: Oundle
| Party | Candidate | Votes | % |
|---|---|---|---|
| Conservative | P. Stearn | 722 | |
| Conservative | C. Reichhold | 721 | |
| Labour | J. Brookfield | 508 | |
| Labour | L. Cox | 443 | |
| Turnout | | | 34.6% |

=== Prebendal Ward (1 seat) ===
East Northamptonshire District Council Elections 1999: Prebendal
| Party | Candidate | Votes | % |
|---|---|---|---|
| Conservative | J. Richardson | 458 | |
| Labour | A. Brookfield | 183 | |
| Turnout | | | 47.6% |

=== Raunds Saxon Ward (2 seats) ===
East Northamptonshire District Council Elections 1999: Raunds Saxon
| Party | Candidate | Votes | % |
|---|---|---|---|
| Conservative | G. Sharman | 435 | |
| Conservative | W. Smith | 431 | |
| Labour | P. Ellis | 389 | |
| Labour | K. Franklin | 362 | |
| Turnout | | | 28.0% |

=== Raunds Windmill Ward (2 seats) ===
East Northamptonshire District Council Elections 1999: Raunds Windmill
| Party | Candidate | Votes | % |
|---|---|---|---|
| Conservative | A. Campbell | 418 | |
| Labour | N. Harvey | 411 | |
| Conservative | R. Davis | 380 | |
| Labour | S. Harvey | 346 | |
| Turnout | | | 27.4% |

=== Ringstead Ward (1 seat) ===
East Northamptonshire District Council Elections 1999: Ringstead
| Party | Candidate | Votes | % |
|---|---|---|---|
| Conservative | M. Peacock | 470 | |
| Labour | F. Jones | 191 | |
| Turnout | | | 51.1% |

=== Rushden East Ward (3 seats) ===
East Northamptonshire District Council Elections 1999: Rushden East
| Party | Candidate | Votes | % |
|---|---|---|---|
| Labour | J. Rolfe | 755 | |
| Labour | L. Rolfe | 727 | |
| Labour | C. Usher | 703 | |
| Conservative | D. Leigh | 496 | |
| Conservative | S. Lever | 443 | |
| Conservative | J. Sheehan | 434 | |
| Turnout | | | 26.6% |

=== Rushden North Ward (3 seats) ===
East Northamptonshire District Council Elections 1999: Rushden North
| Party | Candidate | Votes | % |
|---|---|---|---|
| Conservative | C. Wood | 693 | |
| Conservative | C. Wood | 682 | |
| Labour | C. Williams | 628 | |
| Labour | A. Williams | 577 | |
| Labour | C. Suckling | 557 | |
| Turnout | | | 28.4% |

=== Rushden South Ward (3 seats) ===
East Northamptonshire District Council Elections 1999: Rushden South
| Party | Candidate | Votes | % |
|---|---|---|---|
| Conservative | R. Underwood | 700 | |
| Conservative | R. Pinnock | 635 | |
| Conservative | S. North | 601 | |
| Labour | E. Dicks | 589 | |
| Labour | P. Wix | 507 | |
| Labour | A. Wix | 505 | |
| Turnout | | | 28.6% |

=== Rushden West Ward (3 seats) ===
East Northamptonshire District Council Elections 1999: Rushden West
| Party | Candidate | Votes | % |
|---|---|---|---|
| Labour | L. Thomas | 758 | |
| Labour | C. Allen | 754 | |
| Labour | S. Allen | 705 | |
| Conservative | P. Humphrey | 583 | |
| Conservative | A. Reading | 551 | |
| Turnout | | | 28.9% |

=== Stanwick Ward (1 seat) ===
East Northamptonshire District Council Elections 1999: Stanwick
| Party | Candidate | Votes | % |
|---|---|---|---|
| Conservative | E. Finch | 449 | |
| Labour | S. Jones | 226 | |
| Turnout | | | 47.4% |

=== Thrapston Ward (2 seats) ===
East Northamptonshire District Council Elections 1999: Thrapston
| Party | Candidate | Votes | % |
|---|---|---|---|
| Labour | M. Whiteman | 526 | |
| Labour | S. Feather | 512 | |
| Conservative | B. Patel | 501 | |
| Conservative | P. Chaplin | 419 | |
| Turnout | | | 33.4% |

=== Woodford Ward (1 seat) ===
East Northamptonshire District Council Elections 1999: Woodford
| Party | Candidate | Votes | % |
|---|---|---|---|
| Labour | A. Packham | 388 | |
| Conservative | P. Atkins | 252 | |
| Turnout | | | 43.2% |
