= 1979 East Northamptonshire District Council election =

1979 UK local government election

← 1976	3 May 1979	1983 →

All 36 seats in the East Northamptonshire District Council 19 seats needed for a majority
- Turnout: 82.8%
	First party	Second party	Third party
Party	Conservative	Labour	Independent
Seats won	30	5	1
Popular vote	16,165	10,457	3,397
Percentage	53.8%	34.8%	11.3%
- Map showing the results of the 1979 East Northamptonshire District Council elections.
Council control before election
Conservative
Council control after election
Conservative

The 1979 East Northamptonshire District Council election took place on 3 May 1979 to elect members of East Northamptonshire District Council in Northamptonshire, England. This was on the same day as the 1979 General Election and other local elections. This was the first election to be held under new ward boundaries. The Conservative Party retained overall control of the council which it had held since the council's creation in 1973.

== Ward-by-Ward Results ==
=== Barnwell Ward (1 seat) ===
East Northamptonshire District Council Elections 1979: Barnwell
Party	Candidate	Votes	%
Conservative	R. Fletton		
Conservative win (new seat)			

=== Brigstock Ward (1 seat) ===
East Northamptonshire District Council Elections 1979: Brigstock
Party	Candidate	Votes	%
Conservative	J. Otter	556	
Labour	P. Feather	315	
Turnout			85.2%
Conservative win (new seat)			

=== Drayton Ward (1 seat) ===
East Northamptonshire District Council Elections 1979: Drayton
Party	Candidate	Votes	%
Conservative	P. Sykes	599	
Labour	A. Wildman	305	
Turnout			82.4%
Conservative win (new seat)			

=== Forest Ward (1 seat) ===
East Northamptonshire District Council Elections 1979: Forest
Party	Candidate	Votes	%
Conservative	M.Glithero		
Conservative win (new seat)			

=== Higham Ferriers Ward (3 seats) ===
East Northamptonshire District Council Elections 1979: Higham Ferriers
Party	Candidate	Votes	%
Conservative	G. Murdin	1,914	
Conservative	H. Binder	1,782	
Conservative	D. Lawson	1,638	
Labour	P. Gadsby	1,222	
Labour	B. Freeman	919	
Labour	A. Dunn	871	
Independent	K. Buggs	520	
Turnout			83.6%
Conservative win (new seat)			
Conservative win (new seat)			
Conservative win (new seat)			

=== Irthlingborough Ward (3 seats) ===
East Northamptonshire District Council Elections 1979: Irthlingborough
Party	Candidate	Votes	%
Labour	C. Grimmer	1,849	
Labour	D. Lee	1,392	
Conservative	S. Coghill	1,310	
Labour	P. Houghton	1,304	
Conservative	B. Brightwell	1,221	
Conservative	H. Swainston	1,088	
Turnout			84.2%
Labour win (new seat)			
Labour win (new seat)			
Conservative win (new seat)			

=== Kings Cliffe Ward (1 seat) ===
East Northamptonshire District Council Elections 1979: Kings Cliffe
Party	Candidate	Votes	%
Conservative	J. Brown	332	
Independent	W. Court	308	
Turnout			84.7%
Conservative win (new seat)			

=== Lower Nene Ward (1 seat) ===
East Northamptonshire District Council Elections 1979: Lower Nene
Party	Candidate	Votes	%
Conservative	L. Sturge	420	
Independent	I. Brown	347	
Labour	S. Scrutton	157	
Turnout			88.6%
Conservative win (new seat)			

=== Margaret Beaufort Ward (1 seat) ===
East Northamptonshire District Council Elections 1979: Margaret Beaufort
Party	Candidate	Votes	%
Conservative	H. Gregory	485	
Independent	L. Jupp	464	
Turnout			84.2%
Conservative win (new seat)			

=== Oundle Ward (2 seats) ===
East Northamptonshire District Council Elections 1979: Oundle
Party	Candidate	Votes	%
Independent	R. Sutton	749	
Conservative	W. Peasgood	518	
Conservative	J. Wild	448	
Turnout			81.8%
Independent win (new seat)			
Conservative win (new seat)			

=== Raunds Ward (3 seats) ===
East Northamptonshire District Council Elections 1979: Raunds
Party	Candidate	Votes	%
Conservative	J. Chatburn	1,620	
Conservative	P. Chantrell	1,604	
Conservative	J. Finding	1,602	
Labour	D. Lawrence	1,312	
Labour	W. White	1,306	
Labour	K. Meadows	1,039	
Turnout			80.4%
Conservative win (new seat)			
Conservative win (new seat)			
Conservative win (new seat)			

=== Ringstead Ward (1 seat) ===
East Northamptonshire District Council Elections 1979: Ringstead
Party	Candidate	Votes	%
Conservative	B.Wood		
Conservative win (new seat)			

=== Rushden East Ward (3 seats) ===
East Northamptonshire District Council Elections 1979: Rushden East
Party	Candidate	Votes	%
Labour	E. Dicks	1,796	
Labour	A. Mantle	1,421	
Conservative	I. Bailey	1,381	
Labour	P. Tomas	1,301	
Turnout			80.0%
Labour win (new seat)			
Labour win (new seat)			
Conservative win (new seat)			

=== Rushden North Ward (3 seats) ===
East Northamptonshire District Council Elections 1979: Rushden North
Party	Candidate	Votes	%
Conservative	A. Goulsbra	1,901	
Conservative	C. Wood	1,604	
Conservative	J. Gay	1,449	
Labour	M. Bond	1,337	
Turnout			80.8%
Conservative win (new seat)			
Conservative win (new seat)			
Conservative win (new seat)			

=== Rushden South Ward (3 seats) ===
East Northamptonshire District Council Elections 1979: Rushden South
Party	Candidate	Votes	%
Conservative	J. Whittington	2,338	
Conservative	A. Perkins	2,259	
Conservative	G. Osborne	2,129	
Independent	A. Wilson	1 009	
Turnout			81.4%
Conservative win (new seat)			
Conservative win (new seat)			
Conservative win (new seat)			

=== Rushden West Ward (3 seats) ===
East Northamptonshire District Council Elections 1979: Rushden West
Party	Candidate	Votes	%
Conservative	E. Carmichael	1,812	
Conservative	R. Pinnock	1,569	
Conservative	J. Stott-Everett	1,513	
Labour	H. Graham	1,457	
Labour	J. Macdonald	1,159	
Labour	E. Sampson	1,142	
Turnout			79.6%
Conservative win (new seat)			
Conservative win (new seat)			
Conservative win (new seat)			

=== Stanwick Ward (1 seat) ===
East Northamptonshire District Council Elections 1979: Stanwick
Party	Candidate	Votes	%
Conservative	D. Thoday	668	
Labour	A. Lawrence	232	
Turnout			82.7%
Conservative win (new seat)			

=== Thrapston Ward (2 seats) ===
East Northamptonshire District Council Elections 1979: Thrapston
Party	Candidate	Votes	%
Conservative	G.Hunt		
Conservative	M.Woollard		
Conservative win (new seat)			

=== Willibrook Ward (1 seat) ===
East Northamptonshire District Council Elections 1979: Willibrook
Party	Candidate	Votes	%
Conservative	J.Richardson		
Conservative win (new seat)			

=== Woodford Ward (1 seat) ===
East Northamptonshire District Council Elections 1979: Woodford
Party	Candidate	Votes	%
Labour	E. Hackney	475	
Conservative	R.Clifton	311	
Turnout			82.2%
Labour win (new seat)			
