= 1995 East Northamptonshire District Council election =

1995 UK local government election

← 1991	2 May 1995	1999 →

All 36 seats in the East Northamptonshire District Council 19 seats needed for a majority
- Turnout: 46.9%
	First party	Second party	Third party
Party	Labour	Conservative	Liberal Democrats
Seats won	25	9	2
Seat change	▲16	▼14	▼1
Popular vote	11,216	9,095	1,747
Percentage	46.4%	37.6%	7.2%
- Map showing the results of the 1995 East Northamptonshire District Council elections.
Council control before election
Conservative
Council control after election
Labour

The 1995 East Northamptonshire District Council election took place on 2 May 1995 to elect members of East Northamptonshire District Council in Northamptonshire, England. This was on the same day as other local elections. This was the first election to be held under new ward boundaries. The Labour Party gained overall control of the council for the first and only time in the council's history.

== Ward-by-Ward Results ==
=== Barnwell Ward (1 seat) ===
East Northamptonshire District Council Elections 1995: Barnwell
Party	Candidate	Votes	%
Conservative	S. North	356	
Labour	D. Thompson	212	
Turnout			53.6%
Conservative gain from Liberal Democrats			

=== Brigstock Ward (1 seat) ===
East Northamptonshire District Council Elections 1995: Brigstock
Party	Candidate	Votes	%
Conservative	J. Chudley	345	
Labour	D. Brown	272	
Independent	J. Smoker	89	
Turnout			64.7%
Conservative hold			

=== Drayton Ward (1 seat) ===
East Northamptonshire District Council Elections 1995: Drayton
Party	Candidate	Votes	%
Labour	S. Feather	228	
Liberal Democrats	J. Stamper	213	
Conservative	T. Hankins	203	
Turnout			53.4%
Labour gain from Conservative			

=== Forest Ward (1 seat) ===
East Northamptonshire District Council Elections 1995: Forest
Party	Candidate	Votes	%
Conservative	M.Glithero	462	
Labour	S. Dalzell	167	
Liberal Democrats	P. Bowerman	71	
Turnout			55.0%
Conservative gain from Independent			

=== Higham Ferriers Ward (3 seats) ===
East Northamptonshire District Council Elections 1995: Higham Ferriers
Party	Candidate	Votes	%
Labour	B. Elgood	1,057	
Labour	G. Moore	986	
Labour	A. Dunn	964	
Conservative	G. Murdin	903	
Conservative	D. Lawson	831	
Conservative	H. Binder	782	
Independent	R. Gell	779	
Turnout			50.9%
Labour gain from Conservative			
Labour gain from Conservative			
Labour gain from Conservative			

=== Irthlingborough Ward (3 seats) ===
East Northamptonshire District Council Elections 1995: Irthlingborough
Party	Candidate	Votes	%
Labour	R. Nightingale	1,225	
Labour	A. Packham	1,106	
Labour	T. Dawson	984	
Conservative	E. McGibbon	933	
Conservative	P. Brightwell	841	
Conservative	I. Ferris	652	
Turnout			42.0%
Labour gain from Conservative			
Labour gain from Conservative			
Labour hold			

=== Kings Cliffe Ward (1 seat) ===
East Northamptonshire District Council Elections 1995: Kings Cliffe
Party	Candidate	Votes	%
Liberal Democrats	I. Hetherington	188	
Labour	R. Whitehead	136	
Conservative	G. Wagstaffe	133	
Turnout			50.0%
Liberal Democrats hold			

=== Lower Nene Ward (1 seat) ===
East Northamptonshire District Council Elections 1995: Lower Nene
Party	Candidate	Votes	%
Conservative	P. Banbridge	287	
Labour	J. Dixon	216	
Liberal Democrats	D. Burgess	67	
Turnout			51.3%
Conservative hold			

=== Margaret Beaufort Ward (1 seat) ===
East Northamptonshire District Council Elections 1995: Margaret Beaufort
Party	Candidate	Votes	%
Conservative	H. Gregory	367	
Labour	D. Elliott	177	
Turnout			48.1%
Conservative hold			

=== Oundle Ward (2 seats) ===
East Northamptonshire District Council Elections 1995: Oundle
Party	Candidate	Votes	%
Liberal Democrats	E. Gahan	778	
Conservative	P. Brudenell	653	
Conservative	D. Chapple	437	
Labour	J. Brookfield	402	
Labour	C. Cox	380	
Turnout			43.3%
Liberal Democrats hold			
Conservative hold			

=== Raunds Ward (3 seats) ===
East Northamptonshire District Council Elections 1995: Raunds
Party	Candidate	Votes	%
Labour	M. Roberts	1,347	
Labour	N. Harvey	1,134	
Labour	C. Allen	1,072	
Conservative	J. Chatburn	772	
Conservative	A. Campbell	763	
Conservative	C. Tilley	605	
Liberal Democrats	O. Roberts	430	
Turnout			41.0%
Labour hold			
Labour gain from Conservative			
Labour gain from Conservative			

=== Ringstead Ward (1 seat) ===
East Northamptonshire District Council Elections 1995: Ringstead
Party	Candidate	Votes	%
Conservative	M. Peacock	438	
Labour	J. Barke	329	
Turnout			50.4%
Conservative hold			

=== Rushden East Ward (3 seats) ===
East Northamptonshire District Council Elections 1995: Rushden East
Party	Candidate	Votes	%
Labour	E. Dicks	1,149	
Labour	A. Mantle	838	
Labour	L. Rolfe	776	
Conservative	D. Leigh	318	
Turnout			35.7%
Labour hold			
Labour hold			
Labour hold			

=== Rushden North Ward (3 seats) ===
East Northamptonshire District Council Elections 1995: Rushden North
Party	Candidate	Votes	%
Labour	M. Jackson	868	
Labour	A. Thomas	859	
Labour	C. Williams	795	
Conservative	C. Wood	610	
Conservative	J. Gay	551	
Conservative	B.Catlin	520	
Turnout			34.2%
Labour gain from Conservative			
Labour gain from Conservative			
Labour gain from Conservative			

=== Rushden South Ward (3 seats) ===
East Northamptonshire District Council Elections 1995: Rushden South
Party	Candidate	Votes	%
Labour	P. Wix	1,092	
Labour	A. Wix	1,051	
Labour	D. Sadler	960	
Conservative	G. Osborne	743	
Conservative	R. Underwood	717	
Conservative	J. Church	702	
Turnout			35.7%
Labour gain from Conservative			
Labour gain from Conservative			
Labour hold			

=== Rushden West Ward (3 seats) ===
East Northamptonshire District Council Elections 1995: Rushden West
Party	Candidate	Votes	%
Labour	E. Sampson	948	
Labour	J. Rolfe	874	
Labour	L. Thomas	856	
Independent	J. Walker	611	
Conservative	R. Pinnock	457	
Conservative	C. McGlynn	375	
Turnout			38.7%
Labour hold			
Labour hold			
Labour hold			

=== Stanwick Ward (1 seat) ===
East Northamptonshire District Council Elections 1995: Stanwick
Party	Candidate	Votes	%
Conservative	P. Macgovern	366	
Labour	D. Runnicles	289	
Turnout			41.5%
Conservative hold			

=== Thrapston Ward (2 seats) ===
East Northamptonshire District Council Elections 1995: Thrapston
Party	Candidate	Votes	%
Labour	M. Whiteman	580	
Labour	I. Byrnes	491	
Conservative	J. Bunyan	438	
Independent	P. George	432	
Conservative	D. Scott	397	
Turnout			40.6%
Labour gain from Conservative			
Labour gain from Conservative			

=== Willibrook Ward (1 seat) ===
East Northamptonshire District Council Elections 1995: Willibrook
Party	Candidate	Votes	%
Conservative	J. Richardson	311	
Labour	F. Moss	204	
Turnout			45.0%
Conservative hold			

=== Woodford Ward (1 seat) ===
East Northamptonshire District Council Elections 1995: Woodford
Party	Candidate	Votes	%
Labour	A. Blakeman	318	
Conservative	F. Cullum	203	
Turnout			52.0%
Labour gain from Conservative			
