= Corby Cube =

Municipal building in Corby, Northamptonshire, England

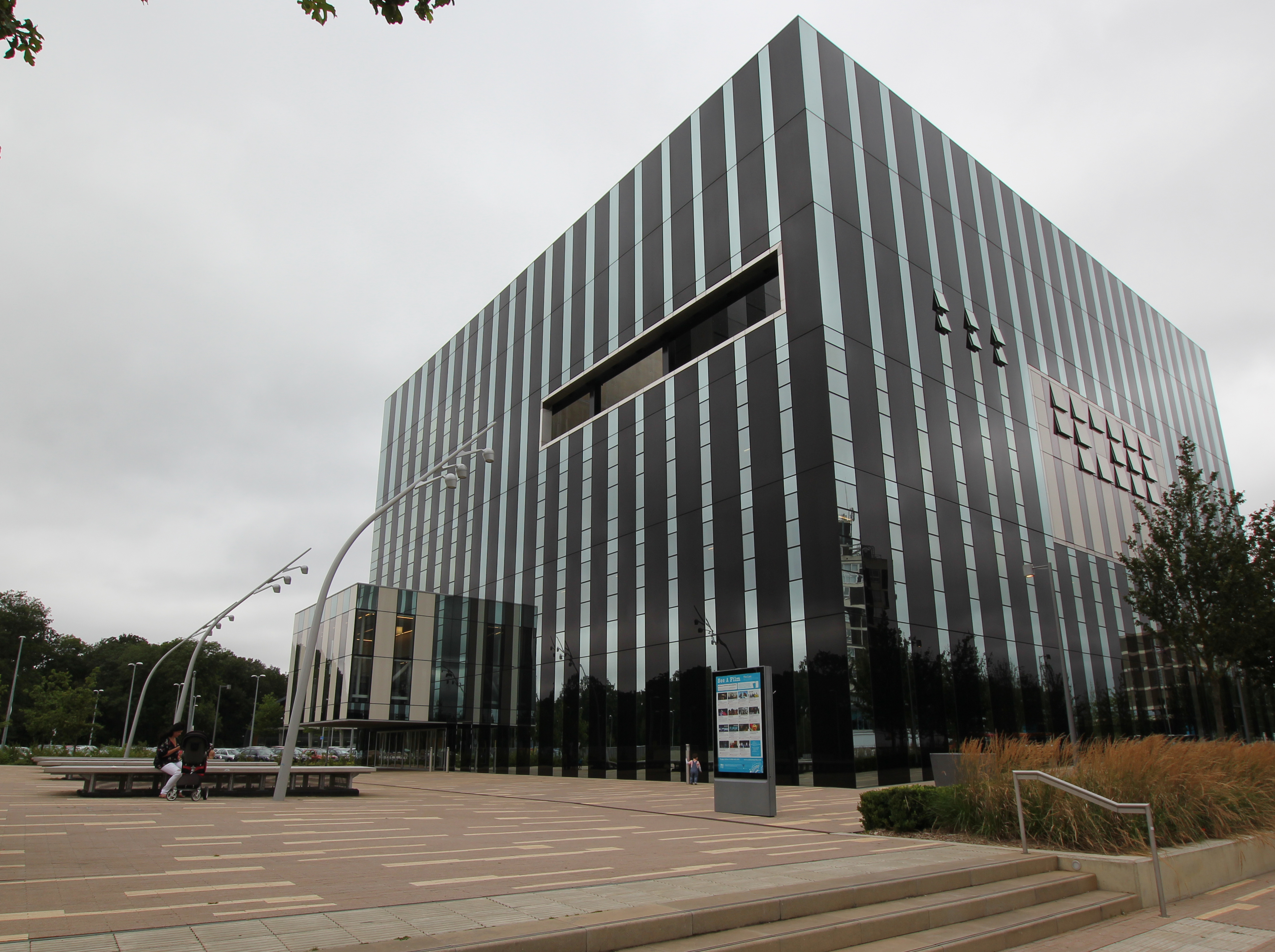
- Corby Cube building 2012

- Location within Northamptonshire

General information
- Location: Corby, Northamptonshire
- Coordinates: 52.48723°N 0.70446°W
- Inaugurated: 2010
- Owner: North Northamptonshire Council

Design and construction
- Architect: Hawkins\Brown
- Main contractor: Galliford Try

Corby Cube is a municipal building in the town of Corby, Northamptonshire, England. Built in 2010, it is occupied by North Northamptonshire Council as its headquarters, but was originally built for Corby Borough Council (abolished in 2021). The building houses a council chamber, a register office, a public library, a 400-seat theatre and a 100-seat multi-use studio space.

== History ==
The building with was designed by Hawkins\Brown and built by Galliford Try at a cost of £47.5 million, opened as the headquarters of Corby Borough Council on 2 November 2010.

== Financial and building controversies ==
A report by Corby Borough Council in 2012 revealed that the Cube was built with dangerous design flaws and almost double its original estimated costs and a capacity of only half of what was planned. In 2012 the working group of the council's Overview and Scrutiny Panel published its report into Cube. It looks into the development and construction of the building. However, the full report contained commercial, financial and legally sensitive information so the public version of the report which was issued was heavily redacted with considerable blanking of text.

In August 2012, the firm of architects of the Cube, Hawkins\Brown, threatened to take Corby council to court over the report into the £12 million authority-overspend on the Cube complex. Along with criticising the council board that ran the building project, the report claims architects Hawkins\Brown did not stick to its brief. Among its conclusions, the report stated that the current Labour-controlled council: "incurred substantial unforeseen costs in order to bring the building into an occupiable state but with limitations on occupancy still unresolved". In September 2012, Hawkins\Brown withdrew its threat of legal action against the borough council. The firm had, however, written to every borough councillor, asking for a chance to defend itself. Councillors were told not to respond "for legal reasons".

In February 2013, water began dripping through the council chamber's ceiling forcing councillors to hold meetings in the canteen. This followed snow and heavy rain. The BBC reported that the Cube cost £47 million, over budget by £12 million, but the final report on the project had not yet been released. Also in February, the length of time taken to publish the audit report into the overspend was called "very disappointing" by Local Government Secretary of State Eric Pickles.

In June 2013 auditors found that the council had sold land now being developed by Tesco for millions of pounds below its market value. Corby Borough Council "may have made decisions contrary to law" in its management of a £67 million regeneration scheme, auditors KPMG said. Also in June 2013, management of regeneration programmes, including the Cube, by Corby Council was condemned by consultants appointed by the Audit Commission. KPMG said arrangements obscured who should make key decisions, oversight at critical points was insufficient and project and financial management was poor. In July 2013 the Conservative group on Corby Council handed what they described as "suspicious" findings of an audit report into the financial dealings of Corby Borough Council to the police for investigation. In August 2013 it was announced than another £600,000 was needed to mend roofs that have been leaking since the building was occupied. Work also needs completing on office space in the building which does not meet building fire safety regulations. Chief Executive Norman Stronach later said that the council would "seek redress" from the architect and contractor and that action to recover extra money spent on the Cube is "a growing inevitability".

On 8 December 2014, Northamptonshire Police began an investigation into financial dealings by Corby Borough Council. In July 2013, Conservative councillors had handed the "suspicious" findings of an audit report to the police to see if a crime had been committed. The audit report examined four major projects, including the Corby Cube, the cost of which went from £35 million to £47 million.

In January 2015, the BBC reported that repairs to the Cube were still going on five years after it opened.

In March 2015 whistle-blower Steven Redfern, Corby Borough Council's former head of property, lodged a £1 million damages claim at the High Court against Corby Council. Redfern said he became "a target for people's venom" after complaining about high-profile land deals in the town. The case was listed to go to the High Court in the summer, but was settled out of court for an undisclosed sum.

In October 2015, Corby Council stated that work on the Corby Cube had been completed, five years after it opened but with a £13 million overspend.

On 3 February 2020, the council was advised to abandon any legal action against the builder and designer.
