= 1987 East Northamptonshire District Council election =

1987 UK local government election

← 1983	7 May 1987	1991 →

All 36 seats in the East Northamptonshire District Council 19 seats needed for a majority
	First party	Second party	Third party
Party	Conservative	Labour	Alliance
Seats won	30	5	1
Seat change	Steady	▼1	▲1
Popular vote	13,429	6,210	4,839
Percentage	52.0%	24.1%	18.7%
- Map showing the results of the 1987 East Northamptonshire District Council elections.
Council control before election
Conservative
Council control after election
Conservative

The 1987 East Northamptonshire District Council election took place on 7 May 1987 to elect members of East Northamptonshire District Council in Northamptonshire, England. This was on the same day as other local elections. The Conservative Party retained overall control of the council which it had held since the council's creation in 1973.

== Ward-by-Ward Results ==
=== Barnwell Ward (1 seat) ===
East Northamptonshire District Council Elections 1987: Barnwell
Party	Candidate	Votes	%
Conservative	R. Fowles	343	
Alliance	P. Baxter	207	
Labour	R. Litawski	48	
Turnout			60.8%
Conservative hold			

=== Brigstock Ward (1 seat) ===
East Northamptonshire District Council Elections 1987: Brigstock
Party	Candidate	Votes	%
Alliance	J. Smoker	361	
Conservative	J. Otter	295	
Turnout			59.9%
Alliance gain from Conservative			

=== Drayton Ward (1 seat) ===
East Northamptonshire District Council Elections 1987: Drayton
Party	Candidate	Votes	%
Conservative	R. Clifton	413	
Alliance	J. McGeown	206	
Turnout			51.2%
Conservative hold			

=== Forest Ward (1 seat) ===
East Northamptonshire District Council Elections 1987: Forest
Party	Candidate	Votes	%
Conservative	M.Glithero	616	
Alliance	G. Smoker	138	
Turnout			60.5%
Conservative hold			

=== Higham Ferriers Ward (3 seats) ===
East Northamptonshire District Council Elections 1987: Higham Ferriers
Party	Candidate	Votes	%
Conservative	G. Murdin	1,436	
Conservative	H. Binder	1,244	
Conservative	D. Lawson	1,220	
Independent	R. Gell	870	
Labour	P. Gadsby	783	
Labour	G. Moore	612	
Labour	B. Elgood	595	
Turnout			57.3%
Conservative hold			
Conservative hold			
Conservative hold			

=== Irthlingborough Ward (3 seats) ===
East Northamptonshire District Council Elections 1987: Irthlingborough
Party	Candidate	Votes	%
Conservative	E. McGibbon	1,181	
Conservative	P. Brightwell	1,119	
Labour	W. Howlett	908	
Conservative	I. Musson	891	
Labour	R. Nightingale	809	
Labour	D. Templeton	726	
Alliance	C. Nightingale	436	
Turnout			51.7%
Conservative gain from Labour			
Conservative hold			
Labour hold			

=== Kings Cliffe Ward (1 seat) ===
East Northamptonshire District Council Elections 1987: Kings Cliffe
Party	Candidate	Votes	%
Conservative	G. Wagstaffe	320	
Independent	M. Day	135	
Alliance	P. Owen	87	
Turnout			65.5%
Conservative hold			

=== Lower Nene Ward (1 seat) ===
East Northamptonshire District Council Elections 1987: Lower Nene
Party	Candidate	Votes	%
Conservative	P. Dixon	474	
Labour	J. Welch	162	
Turnout			59.5%
Conservative hold			

=== Margaret Beaufort Ward (1 seat) ===
East Northamptonshire District Council Elections 1987: Margaret Beaufort
Party	Candidate	Votes	%
Conservative	H. Gregory		
Conservative hold			

=== Oundle Ward (2 seats) ===
East Northamptonshire District Council Elections 1987: Oundle
Party	Candidate	Votes	%
Conservative	P. Brudenell	1,043	
Conservative	M. Slater	842	
Alliance	M. Roffe	580	
Labour	S. Dalzell	486	
Turnout			53.6%
Conservative hold			
Conservative hold			

=== Raunds Ward (3 seats) ===
East Northamptonshire District Council Elections 1987: Raunds
Party	Candidate	Votes	%
Conservative	J. Chatburn	1,202	
Conservative	P. Chantrell	1,154	
Conservative	A. Campbell	1,101	
Labour	M. Roberts	777	
Labour	S. Allen	560	
Alliance	C. Dorks	560	
Labour	E. Beeby	478	
Alliance	T. Burke	472	
Alliance	T. Shrive	378	
Turnout			46.4%
Conservative hold			
Conservative hold			
Conservative hold			

=== Ringstead Ward (1 seat) ===
East Northamptonshire District Council Elections 1987: Ringstead
Party	Candidate	Votes	%
Conservative	J. Barrett	351	
Independent	J. Horsewood	335	
Alliance	D. Harrison	157	
Turnout			61.4%
Conservative hold			

=== Rushden East Ward (3 seats) ===
East Northamptonshire District Council Elections 1987: Rushden East
Party	Candidate	Votes	%
Labour	E. Dicks	1,147	
Labour	A. Mantle	792	
Labour	L. Rolfe	698	
Conservative	D. Leigh	633	
Conservative	A. White	602	
Turnout			42.3%
Labour hold			
Labour hold			
Labour hold			

=== Rushden North Ward (3 seats) ===
East Northamptonshire District Council Elections 1987: Rushden North
Party	Candidate	Votes	%
Conservative	C. Wood	1,056	
Conservative	B. Catlin	1,014	
Conservative	J. Gay	858	
Alliance	J. Swinburne	554	
Labour	P. Tomas	538	
Turnout			41.4%
Conservative hold			
Conservative hold			
Conservative hold			

=== Rushden South Ward (3 seats) ===
East Northamptonshire District Council Elections 1987: Rushden South
Party	Candidate	Votes	%
Conservative	G. Osborne	1,173	
Conservative	J. Wheal	1,113	
Conservative	G. Evelyn	1,078	
Alliance	B. Noble	739	
Alliance	K. Buggs	668	
Turnout			44.7%
Conservative hold			
Conservative hold			
Conservative hold			

=== Rushden West Ward (3 seats) ===
East Northamptonshire District Council Elections 1987: Rushden West
Party	Candidate	Votes	%
Conservative	E. Carmichael	1,012	
Conservative	J. Stott-Everett	895	
Conservative	K. Sulphur	785	
Labour	E. Sampson	761	
Turnout			39.0%
Conservative hold			
Conservative hold			
Conservative hold			

=== Stanwick Ward (1 seat) ===
East Northamptonshire District Council Elections 1987: Stanwick
Party	Candidate	Votes	%
Conservative	E. Gathercole	407	
Alliance	B. Hughes	256	
Labour	R. Crick	58	
Turnout			57.5%
Conservative hold			

=== Thrapston Ward (2 seats) ===
East Northamptonshire District Council Elections 1987: Thrapston
Party	Candidate	Votes	%
Conservative	J. Bunyan	704	
Conservative	J. Whitham	651	
Labour	I. Byrnes	249	
Labour	J. Hill	246	
Alliance	F. Hudd	211	
Turnout			43.0%
Conservative hold			
Conservative hold			

=== Willibrook Ward (1 seat) ===
East Northamptonshire District Council Elections 1987: Willibrook
Party	Candidate	Votes	%
Conservative	J.Richardson	484	
Labour	J. Wilkinson	130	
Alliance	S. Beecroft	128	
Turnout			62.9%
Conservative hold			

=== Woodford Ward (1 seat) ===
East Northamptonshire District Council Elections 1987: Woodford
Party	Candidate	Votes	%
Labour	E. Hackney	325	
Conservative	J. Hawes	286	
Turnout			61.7%
Labour hold			
