= 1983 East Northamptonshire District Council election =

1983 UK local government election

← 1979	5 May 1983	1987 →

All 36 seats in the East Northamptonshire District Council 19 seats needed for a majority
- Turnout: 56.6%
	First party	Second party
Party	Conservative	Labour
Seats won	30	6
Seat change	Steady	▲1
Popular vote	12,696	8,132
Percentage	51.2%	32.8%
- Map showing the results of the 1983 East Northamptonshire District Council elections.
Council control before election
Conservative
Council control after election
Conservative

The 1983 East Northamptonshire District Council election took place on 5 May 1983 to elect members of East Northamptonshire District Council in Northamptonshire, England. This was on the same day as other local elections. The Conservative Party retained overall control of the council which it had held since the council's creation in 1973.

== Ward-by-Ward Results ==
=== Barnwell Ward (1 seat) ===
East Northamptonshire District Council Elections 1983: Barnwell
Party	Candidate	Votes	%
Conservative	R. Fowles	316	
Ind. Conservative	P. Baxter	173	
Labour	P. Wynne	72	
Conservative hold			
Turnout			59.2%

=== Brigstock Ward (1 seat) ===
East Northamptonshire District Council Elections 1983: Brigstock
Party	Candidate	Votes	%
Conservative	J. Otter	389	
Labour	P. Feather	160	
Turnout			52.5%
Conservative hold			

=== Drayton Ward (1 seat) ===
East Northamptonshire District Council Elections 1983: Drayton
Party	Candidate	Votes	%
Conservative	S. Clifton	395	
Labour	B. Wildman	219	
Turnout			54.8%
Conservative hold			

=== Forest Ward (1 seat) ===
East Northamptonshire District Council Elections 1983: Forest
Party	Candidate	Votes	%
Conservative	M.Glithero		
Conservative hold			

=== Higham Ferriers Ward (3 seats) ===
East Northamptonshire District Council Elections 1983: Higham Ferriers
Party	Candidate	Votes	%
Conservative	G. Murdin	1,472	
Conservative	D. Lawson	1,352	
Conservative	H. Binder	1,321	
Labour	P. Gadsby	778	
Labour	G. Moore	562	
Labour	A. Dunn	519	
Alliance	D. Forder	281	
Alliance	L. Greenop	245	
Ecology	S. Green	137	
Turnout			61.1%
Conservative hold			
Conservative hold			
Conservative hold			

=== Irthlingborough Ward (3 seats) ===
East Northamptonshire District Council Elections 1983: Irthlingborough
Party	Candidate	Votes	%
Labour	C. Grimmer	1,470	
Conservative	E. McGibbon	1,100	
Labour	D. Lee	1,061	
Labour	W. Howlett	921	
Conservative	S. Coghill	856	
Turnout			67.2%
Labour hold			
Conservative hold			
Labour hold			

=== Kings Cliffe Ward (1 seat) ===
East Northamptonshire District Council Elections 1983: Kings Cliffe
Party	Candidate	Votes	%
Conservative	G. Wagstaffe	270	
Independent	M. Day	156	
Labour	P. Owen	113	
Turnout			65.8%
Conservative hold			

=== Lower Nene Ward (1 seat) ===
East Northamptonshire District Council Elections 1983: Lower Nene
Party	Candidate	Votes	%
Conservative	P. Dixon	511	
Labour	J. Atkinson	112	
Turnout			59.5%
Conservative hold			

=== Margaret Beaufort Ward (1 seat) ===
East Northamptonshire District Council Elections 1983: Margaret Beaufort
Party	Candidate	Votes	%
Conservative	H. Gregory	357	
Independent	L. Jupp	290	
Turnout			58.3%
Conservative hold			

=== Oundle Ward (2 seats) ===
East Northamptonshire District Council Elections 1983: Oundle
Party	Candidate	Votes	%
Conservative	M. Clack	819	
Conservative	L. Caborn	761	
Labour	S. Dalzell	346	
Independent	M. Berridge	305	
Labour	W. Ives	274	
Turnout			52.6%
Conservative gain from Independent			
Conservative hold			

=== Raunds Ward (3 seats) ===
East Northamptonshire District Council Elections 1983: Raunds
Party	Candidate	Votes	%
Conservative	J. Chatburn	1,138	
Conservative	J. Finding	1,125	
Conservative	P. Chantrell	1,070	
Labour	S. Lack	993	
Labour	M. Roberts	899	
Labour	H. Lawrence	887	
Turnout			46.6%
Conservative hold			
Conservative hold			
Conservative hold			

=== Ringstead Ward (1 seat) ===
East Northamptonshire District Council Elections 1983: Ringstead
Party	Candidate	Votes	%
Conservative	J. Barrett	398	
Independent	P. Ogden	379	
Turnout			60.8%
Conservative hold			

=== Rushden East Ward (3 seats) ===
East Northamptonshire District Council Elections 1983: Rushden East
Party	Candidate	Votes	%
Labour	E. Dicks	1,216	
Labour	A. Mantle	817	
Labour	B. Freeman	675	
Conservative	I. Bailey	630	
Conservative	C. Morris	552	
Alliance	J. Prime	434	
Ecology	L. Dowsett	209	
Turnout			67.1%
Labour hold			
Labour hold			
Labour gain from Conservative			

=== Rushden North Ward (3 seats) ===
East Northamptonshire District Council Elections 1983: Rushden North
Party	Candidate	Votes	%
Conservative	B.Catlin	1,054	
Conservative	J. Gay	1,012	
Conservative	C. Wood	858	
Labour	P. Tomas	475	
Alliance	P. Dent	435	
Labour	J. Brown	407	
Labour	L. Jubb	394	
Alliance	D. McGee	387	
Alliance	K. Plunkett	377	
Turnout			46.2%
Conservative hold			
Conservative hold			
Conservative hold			

=== Rushden South Ward (3 seats) ===
East Northamptonshire District Council Elections 1983: Rushden South
Party	Candidate	Votes	%
Conservative	J. Whittington	2,338	
Conservative	A. Perkins	2,259	
Conservative	G. Osborne	2,129	
Alliance	R. Brook	638	
Labour	J. Richardson	437	
Labour	G. Draper	410	
Labour	J. Wells	383	
Turnout			55.5%
Conservative hold			
Conservative hold			
Conservative hold			

=== Rushden West Ward (3 seats) ===
East Northamptonshire District Council Elections 1983: Rushden West
Party	Candidate	Votes	%
Conservative	E. Carmichael	1,029	
Conservative	J. Stott-Everett	971	
Conservative	R. Pinnock	945	
Labour	J. McDonald	774	
Labour	E. Sampson	760	
Labour	A. Kinsella	727	
Alliance	A. Kinsella	549	
Turnout			54.9%
Conservative hold			
Conservative hold			
Conservative hold			

=== Stanwick Ward (1 seat) ===
East Northamptonshire District Council Elections 1983: Stanwick
Party	Candidate	Votes	%
Conservative	A. Goulsbra	427	
Labour	W. White	202	
Turnout			54.1%
Conservative hold			

=== Thrapston Ward (2 seats) ===
East Northamptonshire District Council Elections 1983: Thrapston
Party	Candidate	Votes	%
Conservative	G.Hunt	764	
Conservative	M.Woollard	658	
Labour	P. Loaring	443	
Labour	I. Byrnes	297	
Turnout			45.1%
Conservative hold			
Conservative hold			

=== Willibrook Ward (1 seat) ===
East Northamptonshire District Council Elections 1983: Willibrook
Party	Candidate	Votes	%
Conservative	J.Richardson		
Conservative hold			

=== Woodford Ward (1 seat) ===
East Northamptonshire District Council Elections 1983: Woodford
Party	Candidate	Votes	%
Labour	E. Hackney	475	
Conservative	J. Hawes	257	
Turnout			57.7%
Labour hold			
