= North Northamptonshire Council =

Unitary local authority in England

Type
- Type: Unitary authority

Leadership
- Chair: Andy Sims, Reform UK since 16 July 2026
- Leader: Martin Griffiths, Reform UK since 22 May 2025
- Chief Executive: Adele Wylie since 27 January 2024

Structure
- Political groups: Administration (39) Reform (39) Other parties (29) Conservative (11) Green (8) Labour (4) Liberal Democrats (1) Restore (1) Independent (4)

Elections
- Last election: 1 May 2025
- Next election: 3 May 2029

Meeting place
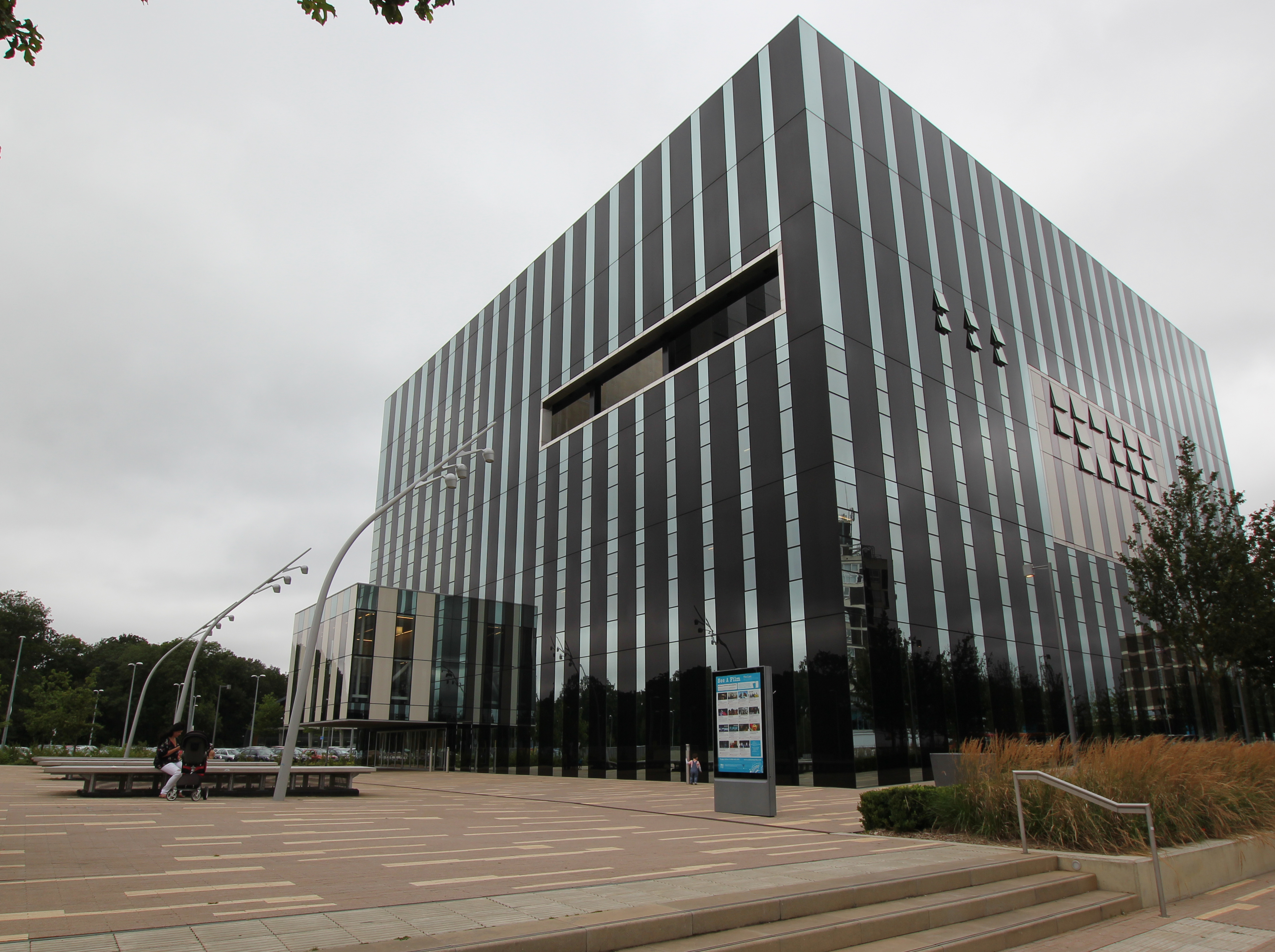
- The Cube, George Street, Corby, NN17 1QG

Website
- www.northnorthants.gov.uk

North Northamptonshire Council is the local authority for North Northamptonshire, a local government district in the ceremonial county of Northamptonshire, England. It is a unitary authority, being a district council which also performs the functions of a county council. The council is based at The Cube in Corby. It has been under Reform UK majority control since the 2025 election.

== History ==
The council was created in 2021. It took over the functions of the four abolished district councils of Corby Borough Council, East Northamptonshire District Council, Kettering Borough Council, and Wellingborough Borough Council, as well as the functions of the abolished Northamptonshire County Council within the area.

== Governance ==
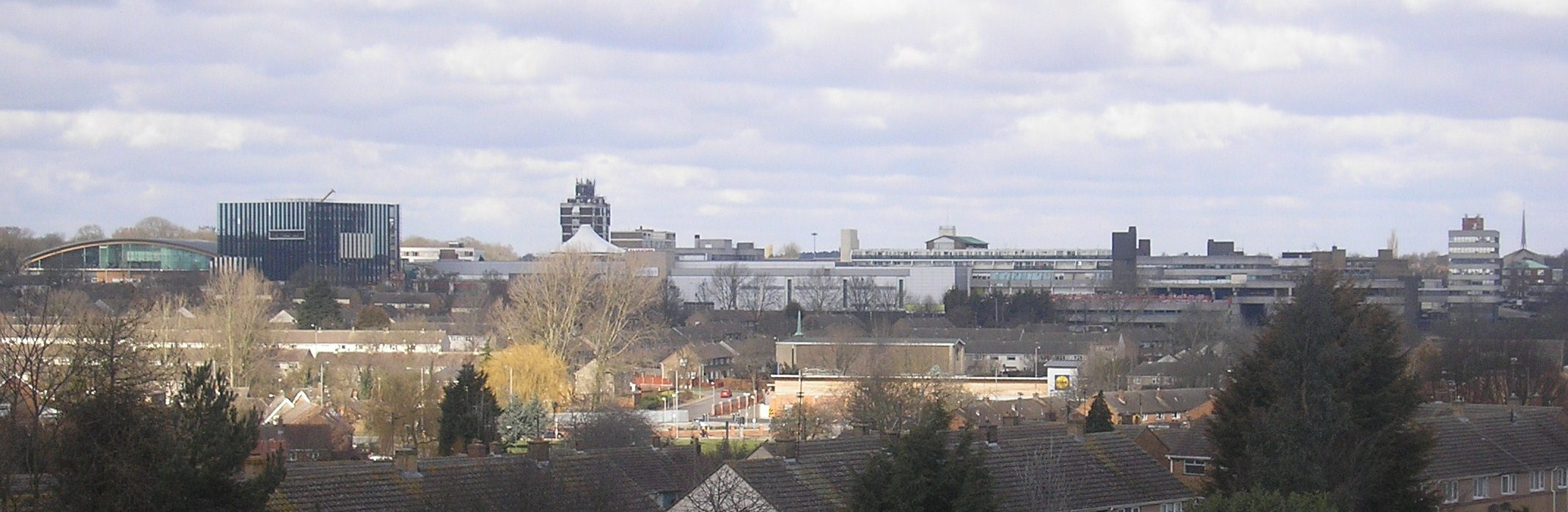
Corby, the administrative centre of North Northamptonshire

Legally, North Northamptonshire Council is a district council which also performs the functions of a county council, making it a unitary authority. Some county-wide functions, such as the Northamptonshire Fire and Rescue Service, are overseen by joint committees of North Northamptonshire Council and West Northamptonshire Council, the other unitary authority in the county.

The whole area is also covered by civil parishes, which form a second tier of local government.

== Political control ==
Since the 2025 election, Reform UK have held a majority of the seats on the council:

Party in control	Years
Conservative	2021–2025
Reform	2025–present

== Leadership ==
The leaders of the council from its first meeting following its creation in 2021 have been:

Councillor	Party	From	To
Jason Smithers	Conservative	26 May 2021	May 2025
Martin Griffiths	Reform	22 May 2025	

Russell Roberts, outgoing leader of the old Kettering Borough Council, had served as leader of the shadow authority set up to oversee the transition to the new arrangements.

== Composition ==
Following the 2025 election and subsequent changes up to July 2026, the composition of the council was:

Party	Councillors
Reform	39
Conservative	11
Green	8
Labour	4
Liberal Democrats	1
Restore	1
Independent	4
Total	68

The next election is due in 2029.

== Elections ==
An election for a shadow authority were due to be held on Thursday 7 May 2020, but was postponed due to the COVID-19 pandemic. The election was instead held on 6 May 2021 and the Conservatives won a majority of seats. The council originally comprised 78 councillors elected across 26 wards. Ward boundaries were redrawn for the 2025 election, reducing the number of councillors to 68.

== Premises ==
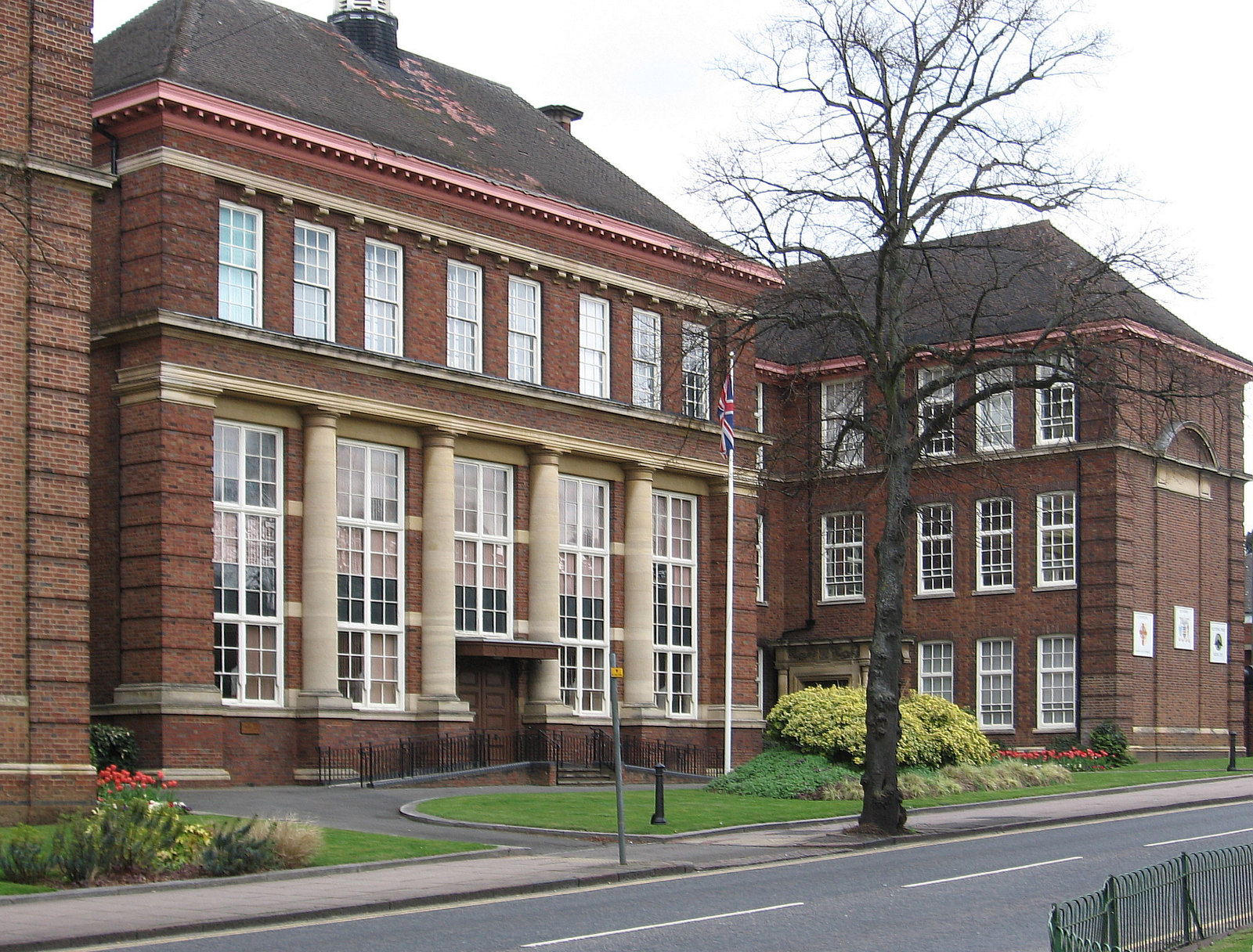
Kettering Municipal Offices, council's area office in Kettering

The council inherited four sets of offices from the predecessor authorities, notably including the Corby Cube, the Kettering Municipal Offices, Swanspool House in Wellingborough, and the old East Northamptonshire District Council offices on Cedar Drive in Thrapston. The Corby Cube was chosen as the main meeting place. The other buildings serve as area offices. Some consolidation of the council's offices has been taking place since the council came into being.

== See also ==
- 2019–2023 structural changes to local government in England
- North Northamptonshire Council elections
- West Northamptonshire Council, another unitary authority created in Northamptonshire in April 2021.
