= 2015 East Northamptonshire District Council election =

2015 UK local government election

- 5 May 2015

All 40 seats in the East Northamptonshire District Council 21 seats needed for a majority

	First party	Second party	Third party
Party	Conservative	Independent	Labour
Last election	35 seats, 58.1%	3 seats, 12.1%	2 seats, 24.9%
Seats won	37	2	1
Seat change	▲2	▼1	▼1
Popular vote	22,342	2,529	9,448
Percentage	53.8%	6.1%	22.7%
Swing	▲4.3%	▼6.0%	▼2.2%
- Results by ward
Council control before election
Conservative
Council control after election
Conservative

The 2015 East Northamptonshire District Council election took place on 7 May 2015 to elect members of the East Northamptonshire District Council in England. It was held on the same day as other local elections. The Conservative Party retained overall control of the council.
