= East Northamptonshire =

Former non-metropolitan district in England

Coordinates: 52.45°N 0.50°W

- Non-metropolitan district
- East Northamptonshire shown within Northamptonshire
- Sovereign state: United Kingdom
- Constituent country: England
- Region: East Midlands
- Non-metropolitan county: Northamptonshire
- Status: Non-metropolitan district
- Admin HQ: Thrapston
- Incorporated: 1 April 1974

Government
  - Type: Non-metropolitan district council
  - Body: East Northamptonshire Council
  - Leadership: Alternative - Sec.31 ( )

Area
  - Total: 196.8 sq mi (509.8 km^{2})

Population (2019)
  - Total: 94,527
  - Density: 480.2/sq mi (185.4/km^{2})
  - Ethnicity: 98.3% White
- Time zone: UTC0 (GMT)
  - Summer (DST): UTC+1 (BST)
- ONS code: 34UD (ONS); E07000152 (GSS)
- OS grid reference: TL0192784659
- Website: www.east-northamptonshire.gov.uk

East Northamptonshire District. (Shaded area is the county of Northamptonshire)

East Northamptonshire was a local government district in Northamptonshire, England, from 1974 to 2021. Its council was based in Thrapston and Rushden. Other towns included Oundle, Raunds, Irthlingborough and Higham Ferrers. The town of Rushden was by far the largest settlement in the district. The population of the district at the 2011 Census was 86,765.

The district bordered onto the Borough of Corby, the Borough of Kettering, the Borough of Wellingborough, the Borough of Bedford, the City of Peterborough, the District of Huntingdonshire, South Kesteven District and the unitary authority county of Rutland.

The district was formed on 1 April 1974, under the Local Government Act 1972, by a merger of the municipal borough of Higham Ferrers, with the urban districts of Irthlingborough, Oundle, Raunds and Rushden, along with Oundle and Thrapston Rural District, and Newton Bromswold from Wellingborough Rural District.

Much of the district was home to Rockingham Forest, once a Royal hunting forest which takes its name from the village of Rockingham where William I built a castle.

The district was home to several of Northamptonshire's airfields including Spanhoe, King's Cliffe, Deenethorpe, Polebrook, Chelveston and Lyveden.

== Abolition and replacement ==
In March 2018, following suspension of the County Council arising from its becoming insolvent, due to financial and cultural mismanagement by the cabinet and officers, the then Secretary of State for Local Government, Sajid Javid, sent commissioner Max Caller into the council, who recommended the county council and all district and borough councils in the county be abolished, and replaced by two unitary authorities, one covering the West, and one the North of the county. These proposals were approved in April 2019. It meant that the districts of Daventry, Northampton and South Northamptonshire were merged to form a new unitary authority called West Northamptonshire, whilst the second unitary authority North Northamptonshire consists of Corby, East Northamptonshire, Kettering and Wellingborough districts. These new authorities came into being on 1 April 2021. Elections for the new authorities were due to be held on 7 May 2020, but were delayed due to the COVID-19 pandemic.

== Geography ==
There were six towns in the district. Rushden was by far the largest with a population of 29,272. It is situated in the very south of the district and forms a single urban area with the neighbouring town of Higham Ferrers which has a population of 7,145. The second largest town in the district was Raunds, population 8,641 followed closely by Irthlingborough, population 8,535. The smallest town in the district was Thrapston where the HQ of the East Northamptonshire council was located. Oundle is a historical market town with many ancient buildings, including St Peter's parish church with the tallest spire in the county and a large public school. Higham Ferrers, which is part of Rushden's urban area, was the birthplace for Henry Chichele and home of Chichele College. Irthlingborough was home to Rushden & Diamonds Football Club before its liquidation.

There were no railway stations in East Northamptonshire. There is one College in East Northamptonshire.

== Settlements and parishes ==
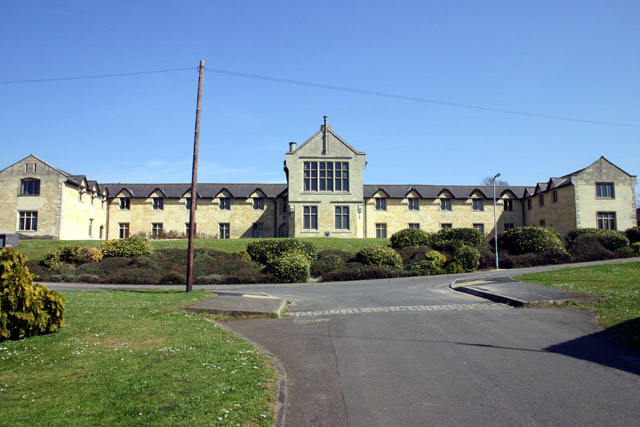
East Northamptonshire council offices in Thrapston

- Achurch, Aldwincle, Apethorpe, Ashton
- Barnwell, Benefield, Blatherwycke, Brigstock, Bulwick
- Chelveston cum Caldecott, Clopton, Collyweston, Cotterstock
- Deene, Deenethorpe, Denford, Duddington-with-Fineshade
- Easton-on-the-Hill
- Fotheringhay
- Glapthorn, Great Addington
- Hargrave, Harringworth, Hemington, Higham Ferrers
- Irthlingborough, Islip
- King's Cliffe
- Laxton, Lilford-cum-Wigsthorpe
- Little Addington, Lowick, Luddington, Lutton
- Nassington, Newton Bromswold
- Oundle
- Pilton, Polebrook
- Raunds, Ringstead, Rushden
- Shotley, Southwick, Stanwick, Stoke Doyle, Sudborough
- Tansor, Thrapston, Thurning, Thorpe Waterville, Titchmarsh, Thorpe Achurch, Twywell
- Wadenhoe, Wakerley, Warmington, Woodford, Woodnewton
- Yarwell

== See also ==
- Grade I listed buildings in East Northamptonshire
- Grade II* listed buildings in East Northamptonshire
