= Results of the 2016 United Kingdom European Union membership referendum =

2016 United Kingdom European Union membership referendum
- 23 June 2016
- Should the United Kingdom remain a member of the European Union or leave the European Union?
- Outcome: The United Kingdom votes to leave the European Union (Brexit)

Results
Choice	Votes	%
Leave	17,410,742	51.89%
Remain	16,141,241	48.11%
Valid votes	33,551,983	99.92%
Invalid or blank votes	25,359	0.08%
Total votes	33,577,342	100.00%
Registered voters/turnout	46,500,001	72.21%
- Results by local voting area Leave: 50–60% 60–70% 70-80% Remain: 50–60% 60–70% 70-80% 90-100%
- On the map, the darker shades for a colour indicate a larger margin. The electorate of 46.5m represents 70.8% of the population.

The 2016 United Kingdom European Union membership referendum took place in the United Kingdom and Gibraltar on 23 June 2016. Membership of the European Union had been a topic of political debate in the United Kingdom since the country joined the European Communities (then commonly referred to as the "Common Market" by the British people) in 1973. This referendum was conducted very differently from the European Communities membership referendum in 1975; a more localised and regionalised counting procedure was used, and the ballot was overseen by the Electoral Commission, a public body that did not exist at the time of the first vote. This article lists, by voting area for Great Britain and Gibraltar and by parliamentary constituency for Northern Ireland, all the results of the referendum, each ordered into national and regional sections.

Under the provisions of the European Union Referendum Act 2015, there were a total of 382 voting areas across twelve regions, using the same boundaries as used in European Parliamentary elections since 1999, under the provisions of the European Parliamentary Elections Act 2002, with votes counted at local authority level. In England the 326 local government districts were used as the voting areas; these consist of all unitary authorities, all metropolitan boroughs, all shire districts, the London boroughs, the City of London and the Isles of Scilly. The nine regions of England were then also used to count the votes at the regional level, with Gibraltar being regarded as part of South West England. Northern Ireland was a single voting area as well as being a regional count, although local totals by Westminster parliamentary constituency area were announced. In Scotland the 32 Scottish council areas were used as voting areas, and there was a single national count. In Wales the 22 Welsh council areas were used as the voting areas, and there was a single national count.

Verification and counting began as soon as the polls closed on 23 June from 22:00 BST onwards (making it the first UK-wide referendum to be counted overnight) and took nine hours and twenty minutes to complete. The early results showed at different times narrow leads for both Remain and Leave; however, Leave took the lead in the national vote count for the final time at 02:58 BST when Castle Point declared its result. The result of the referendum was forecast by the BBC just before 04:40 BST (around 6 hours 40 minutes after polls closed), with around 308 results declared at the time. The first result announced was Gibraltar, and the last was Cornwall.

On 24 June 2016, the recorded result was that the UK voted to leave the European Union by 51.89% for Leave to 48.11% for Remain, a margin of 3.78%. This corresponded to 17,410,742 votes to leave and 16,141,241 to remain, a margin of 1,269,501 votes.

== United Kingdom ==
Of the 382 voting areas in Great Britain and Gibraltar and the 18 Northern Ireland parliamentary constituencies, a total of 270 returned "majority" votes in favour of "Leave the European Union", while 129 returned "majority" votes in favour of "Remain a member of the European Union", including all 32 voting areas in Scotland. Leave Remain

The final result of the referendum for the United Kingdom and Gibraltar was declared at Manchester Town Hall at 0720 BST on Friday 24 June 2016, after all the 382 voting areas and the twelve UK regions had declared their results, by the Chief Counting Officer (CCO) for the referendum, Jenny Watson. In a UK-wide referendum the position of CCO is held by the chair of the Electoral Commission. The following figures are as reported by the Electoral Commission.

"Leave the European Union" secured a majority of 1,269,501 votes (3.78%) over those who had voted in favour of "Remain a member of the European Union". England (except Greater London) and Wales voted to "Leave", while Scotland and Northern Ireland voted to "Remain".

2016 United Kingdom European Union membership referendum
Choice	Votes	%
Leave the European Union	17,410,742	51.89
Remain a member of the European Union	16,141,241	48.11
Total	33,551,983	100.00
Valid votes	33,551,983	99.92
Invalid/blank votes	25,359	0.08
Total votes	33,577,342	100.00
Registered voters/turnout	46,500,001	72.21
Source: Electoral Commission

National referendum results (excluding invalid votes)
Leave; 17,410,742 (51.9%)	Remain; 16,141,241 (48.1%)
▲50%

=== Results by United Kingdom regions ===
Results by regions and countries

Region	Electorate	Turnout of eligible voters	Votes		Proportion of votes		Invalid votes	Highest Remain vote	Highest Leave vote
Region	Electorate	Turnout of eligible voters	Remain	Leave	Remain	Leave	Invalid votes	Highest Remain vote	Highest Leave vote
East Midlands	3,384,299	74.2%	1,033,036	1,475,479	41.18%	58.82%	1,981	Rushcliffe 57.6%	Boston 75.6%
East of England	4,398,796	75.7%	1,448,616	1,880,367	43.52%	56.48%	2,329	Cambridge 73.8%	Castle Point 72.7%
Greater London	5,424,768	69.7%	2,263,519	1,513,232	59.93%	40.07%	4,453	Lambeth 78.6%	Havering 69.7%
North East England	1,934,341	69.3%	562,595	778,103	41.96%	58.04%	689	Newcastle upon Tyne 50.7%	Hartlepool 69.6%
North West England	5,241,568	70.0%	1,699,020	1,966,925	46.35%	53.65%	2,682	Manchester 60.4%	Blackpool 67.5%
Northern Ireland	1,260,955	62.7%	440,707	349,442	55.78%	44.22%	374	Foyle 78.3%	North Antrim 62.2%
Scotland	3,987,112	67.2%	1,661,191	1,018,322	62.00%	38.00%	1,666	City of Edinburgh 74.4%	Moray 49.9%
South East England	6,465,404	76.8%	2,391,718	2,567,965	48.22%	51.78%	3,427	Oxford 70.3%	Gravesham 65.4%
South West England (including Gibraltar)	4,138,134	76.7%	1,503,019	1,669,711	47.37%	52.63%	2,179	Gibraltar 95.9%	Torbay 63.2%
Wales	2,270,272	71.7%	772,347	854,572	47.47%	52.53%	1,135	Cardiff 60.0%	Blaenau Gwent 62.0%
West Midlands	4,116,572	72.0%	1,207,175	1,755,687	40.74%	59.26%	2,507	Warwick 58.8%	Stoke-on-Trent 69.4%
Yorkshire and the Humber	3,877,780	70.7%	1,158,298	1,580,937	42.29%	57.71%	1,937	York 58.0%	North East Lincolnshire 69.9%

=== Results by United Kingdom constituent countries and Gibraltar ===
Left column: Leave; right column: Remain. England, red: Wales, green; Scotland, blue; and N. Ireland, white.

Results by country

Country	Electorate	Turnout of eligible voters	Votes		Proportion of votes		Invalid votes
Country	Electorate	Turnout of eligible voters	Remain	Leave	Remain	Leave	Invalid votes
England	38,981,662	73.0%	13,247,674	15,187,583	46.59%	53.41%	22,157
Gibraltar	24,119	83.7%	19,322	823	95.91%	4.08%	27
Northern Ireland	1,260,955	62.3%	440,707	349,442	55.78%	44.22%	384
Scotland	3,987,112	67.2%	1,661,191	1,018,322	62.00%	38.00%	1,666
Wales	2,270,272	71.7%	772,347	854,572	47.47%	52.53%	1,135

=== Results from the 30 largest cities in the United Kingdom ===
Out of over 33.5 million valid votes cast across the United Kingdom, over 8.8 million, or just over one quarter, were cast in thirty major cities that each gathered 100,000 votes or more. 16 of those cities voted to Leave, and 14 voted to Remain, or 53% Leave and 47% Remain.

In those 30 cities, votes to Remain outnumbered those to Leave by over 900,000 (about 4.9 million to 4 million or 55.2% to 44.8%), while in the other voting areas, the votes to Leave outnumbered those to Remain by nearly 2.2 million (about 13.5 million to 11.3 million, or 54.4% to 45.6%).

City	Voting region (& Remain %) ^{[b]}	Total votes	Turn- out	Votes			Percent of votes ^{[b]}	
City	Voting region (& Remain %) ^{[b]}	Total votes	Turn- out	Remain	Leave	Margin ^{[c]}	Remain	Leave
Greater London	London (59.9%)	3,776,751	69.7%	2,263,519	1,513,232	+750,287	59.9%	40.1%
Birmingham	W. Midlands (40.7%)	450,702	63.7%	223,451	227,251	−3,800	49.6%	50.4%
Leeds	Yorks/Humber (42.3%)	387,337	71.3%	194,863	192,474	+2,389	50.3%	49.7%
Sheffield	Yorks/Humber (42.3%)	266,753	67.3%	130,735	136,018	−5,283	49.0%	51.0%
Glasgow	Scotland (62.0%)	252,809	56.2%	168,335	84,474	+83,861	66.6%	33.4%
Edinburgh	Scotland (62.0%)	252,294	72.9%	187,796	64,498	+123,298	74.4%	25.6%
Bradford	Yorks/Humber (42.3%)	228,488	66.7%	104,575	123,913	−19,338	45.8%	54.2%
Bristol	South West (47.4%)	228,445	73.1%	141,027	87,418	+53,609	61.7%	38.3%
Liverpool	North West (46.3%)	203,554	64.0%	118,453	85,101	+33,352	58.2%	41.8%
Manchester	North West (46.3%)	201,814	59.7%	121,823	79,991	+41,832	60.4%	39.6%
Wakefield	Yorks/Humber (42.3%)	175,042	71.1%	58,877	116,165	−57,288	33.6%	66.4%
Cardiff	Wales (47.5%)	169,604	69.6%	101,788	67,816	+33,972	60.0%	40.0%
greater Belfast (Note: Vote totals for Belfast are based on the returns from the four parliamentary constituencies in Belfast. These include areas in districts outside the City of Belfast)	N. Ireland (55.8%)	158,365	—	94,915	63,450	+31,465	59.9%	40.1%
Coventry	W. Midlands (40.7%)	153,064	69.2%	67,967	85,097	−17,130	44.4%	55.6%
Brighton & Hove	South East (48.2%)	146,675	74.0%	100,648	46,027	+54,621	68.6%	31.4%
Leicester	E. Midlands (41.2%)	138,972	65.0%	70,980	67,992	+2,988	51.1%	48.9%
Sunderland	North East (42.0%)	134,324	64.8%	51,930	82,394	−30,464	38.7%	61.3%
Plymouth	South West (47.4%)	133,455	71.4%	53,458	79,997	−26,539	40.1%	59.9%
Newcastle upon Tyne	North East (42.0%)	129,003	67.6%	65,405	63,598	+1,807	50.7%	49.3%
Nottingham	E. Midlands (41.2%)	120,661	61.8%	59,318	61,343	−2,025	49.2%	50.8%
Derby	E. Midlands (41.2%)	120,655	70.5%	51,612	69,043	−17,431	42.8%	57.2%
Swansea	Wales (47.5%)	120,243	69.5%	58,307	61,936	−3,629	48.5%	51.5%
Wolverhampton	W. Midlands (40.7%)	117,936	67.5%	44,138	73,798	−29,660	37.4%	62.6%
Stoke-on-Trent	W. Midlands (40.7%)	117,590	65.7%	36,027	81,563	−45,536	30.6%	69.4%
Kingston upon Hull	Yorks/Humber (42.3%)	113,355	62.9%	36,709	76,646	−39,937	32.4%	67.6%
Salford	North West (46.3%)	109,815	63.2%	47,430	62,385	−14,955	43.2%	56.8%
York	Yorks/Humber (42.3%)	109,600	70.6%	63,617	45,983	+17,634	58.0%	42.0%
Southampton	South East (48.2%)	107,665	68.1%	49,738	57,927	−8,189	46.2%	53.8%
Aberdeen	Scotland (62.0%)	104,714	67.9%	63,985	40,729	+23,256	61.1%	38.9%
Portsmouth	South East (48.2%)	98,720	70.3%	41,384	57,336	−15,952	41.9%	58.1%
Total of 30 cities	U.K. (48.1%)	8,828,405	—	4,872,810	3,955,595	+917,215	55.2%	44.8%
Other voting areas	U.K. (48.1%)	24,723,578	—	11,268,431	13,455,147	−2,186,716	45.6%	54.4%
United Kingdom	U.K.	33,551,983	72.2%	16,141,241	17,410,742	−1,269,501	48.1%	51.9%
Notes: [a] Vote totals for Belfast are based on the returns from the four parliamentary constituencies in Belfast. These include areas in districts outside the City of Belfast. [b] Lighter shades indicate a prevailing Remain or Leave vote of 52.0% or less; darker shades one of 58.0% or more. [c] Margins are (arbitrarily) positive (+) when they indicate the excess of Remain votes over Leave, and negative (−) when they indicate the excess of Leave votes over Remain.

== England ==
The English local districts were used as the voting areas for the referendum in England; these consist of all unitary authorities, all metropolitan districts, all non-metropolitan districts, the London boroughs, the City of London and the Isles of Scilly.

Unlike the other constituent countries of the United Kingdom there was no centralised national count of the votes in England as counting was done within the nine separate regions. Figures from Gibraltar are included in the South West England region.

2016 United Kingdom European Union membership referendum (England) (including Gibraltar)
Choice	Votes	%
Leave the European Union	15,188,406	53.38
Remain a member of the European Union	13,266,996	46.62
Total	28,455,402	100.00
Valid votes	28,455,482	99.92
Invalid/blank votes	22,184	0.08
Total votes	28,477,666	100.00
Registered voters/turnout	39,005,781	73.01
Source: Electoral Commission

England (including Gibraltar) referendum results (without spoiled ballots):
Leave: 15,188,406 (53.4%)	Remain: 13,266,996 (46.6%)
▲

England was broken down into 9 regional count areas using the same regional constituency boundaries as used in European Parliamentary elections.

=== East Midlands ===
Voting areas of the East Midlands region Leave Remain

2016 United Kingdom European Union membership referendum (East Midlands)
Choice	Votes	%
Leave the European Union	1,475,479	58.82
Remain a member of the European Union	1,033,036	41.18
Total	2,508,515	100.00
Valid votes	2,508,515	99.92
Invalid/blank votes	1,891	0.08
Total votes	2,510,406	100.00
Registered voters/turnout	3,384,299	74.18
Source: Electoral Commission

East Midlands referendum results (without spoiled ballots):
Leave: 1,475,479 (58.9%)	Remain: 1,033,036 (41.1%)
▲

The East Midlands region was broken down into 40 voting areas.

District	Voter turnout, of eligible	Votes		Proportion of votes	
District	Voter turnout, of eligible	Remain	Leave	Remain	Leave
Amber Valley	76.3%	29,319	44,501	39.7%	60.3%
Ashfield	72.8%	20,179	46,720	30.2%	69.8%
Bassetlaw	74.8%	20,575	43,392	32.2%	67.8%
Blaby	76.5%	22,888	33,583	40.5%	59.5%
Bolsover	72.3%	12,242	29,730	29.2%	70.8%
Boston	77.2%	7,430	22,974	24.4%	75.6%
Broxtowe	78.3%	29,672	35,754	45.4%	54.6%
Charnwood	70.4%	43,500	50,672	46.2%	53.8%
Chesterfield	71.9%	22,946	34,478	40.0%	60.0%
Corby	74.1%	11,470	20,611	35.8%	64.2%
Daventry	80.9%	20,443	28,938	41.4%	58.6%
Derby	70.5%	51,612	69,043	42.8%	57.2%
Derbyshire Dales	81.9%	22,633	24,095	48.4%	51.6%
East Lindsey	74.9%	23,515	56,613	29.3%	70.7%
East Northamptonshire	76.9%	21,680	30,894	41.2%	58.8%
Erewash	76.0%	25,791	40,739	38.8%	61.2%
Gedling	76.5%	30,035	37,542	44.4%	55.6%
High Peak	75.6%	27,116	27,717	49.5%	50.5%
Harborough	81.4%	27,028	27,850	49.3%	50.7%
Hinckley and Bosworth	76.7%	25,969	39,501	39.7%	60.3%
Kettering	76.4%	21,030	32,877	39.0%	61.0%
Leicester	65.0%	70,980	67,992	51.1%	48.9%
Lincoln	69.3%	18,902	24,992	43.1%	56.9%
Mansfield	72.6%	16,417	39,927	29.1%	70.9%
Melton	81.3%	12,695	17,610	41.9%	58.1%
Newark and Sherwood	76.8%	26,571	40,516	39.6%	60.4%
North East Derbyshire	75.2%	22,075	37,235	37.2%	62.8%
Northampton	72.6%	43,805	61,454	41.6%	58.4%
North Kesteven	78.4%	25,570	42,183	37.7%	62.3%
North West Leicestershire	77.9%	22,642	34,969	39.3%	60.7%
Nottingham	61.8%	59,318	61,343	49.2%	50.8%
Oadby and Wigston	73.7%	14,292	17,173	45.4%	54.6%
Rushcliffe	81.5%	40,522	29,888	57.6%	42.4%
Rutland	78.1%	11,353	11,613	49.4%	50.6%
South Derbyshire	76.8%	22,479	34,216	39.6%	60.4%
South Holland	75.3%	13,074	36,423	26.4%	73.6%
South Kesteven	78.2%	33,047	49,424	40.1%	59.9%
South Northamptonshire	79.4%	25,853	30,771	45.7%	54.3%
Wellingborough	75.4%	15,462	25,679	37.6%	62.4%
West Lindsey	74.5%	20,906	33,847	38.2%	61.8%

=== East of England ===
Voting areas of the East of England region Leave Remain

2016 United Kingdom European Union membership referendum (East of England)
Choice	Votes	%
Leave the European Union	1,880,367	56.48
Remain a member of the European Union	1,448,616	43.52
Total	3,328,983	100.00
Valid votes	3,328,983	99.93
Invalid/blank votes	2,329	0.07
Total votes	3,331,312	100.00
Registered voters/turnout	4,398,796	75.73
Source: Electoral Commission

East of England referendum results (without spoiled ballots):
Leave: 1,880,367 (56.5%)	Remain: 1,448,616 (43.5%)
▲

The East of England region was broken down into 47 voting areas.

District	Voter turnout, of eligible	Votes		Proportion of votes	
District	Voter turnout, of eligible	Remain	Leave	Remain	Leave
Babergh	78.2%	25,309	29,933	45.8%	54.2%
Basildon	73.8%	30,748	67,251	31.4%	68.6%
Bedford	72.1%	41,497	44,569	48.2%	51.8%
Braintree	76.6%	33,523	52,713	38.9%	61.1%
Breckland	74.3%	26,313	47,235	35.8%	64.2%
Brentwood	79.5%	19,077	27,627	40.8%	59.2%
Broadland	78.3%	35,469	42,268	45.6%	54.4%
Broxbourne	73.7%	17,166	33,706	33.7%	66.3%
Cambridge	72.2%	42,682	15,117	73.8%	26.2%
Castle Point	75.3%	14,154	37,691	27.3%	72.7%
Central Bedfordshire	77.8%	69,670	89,134	43.9%	56.1%
Chelmsford	77.6%	47,545	53,249	47.2%	52.8%
Colchester	75.1%	44,414	51,305	46.4%	53.6%
Dacorum	79.1%	42,542	43,702	49.3%	50.7%
East Cambridgeshire	77.0%	23,599	24,487	49.1%	50.9%
East Hertfordshire	80.3%	42,372	42,994	49.6%	50.4%
Epping Forest	76.8%	28,676	48,176	37.3%	62.7%
Fenland	73.7%	15,055	37,571	28.6%	71.4%
Forest Heath	72.5%	9,791	18,160	35.0%	65.0%
Great Yarmouth	69.0%	14,284	35,844	28.5%	71.5%
Harlow	73.5%	13,867	29,602	31.9%	68.1%
Hertsmere	76.6%	27,593	28,532	49.2%	50.8%
Huntingdonshire	77.8%	45,729	54,198	45.8%	54.2%
Ipswich	72.5%	27,698	38,655	41.7%	58.3%
King's Lynn and West Norfolk	74.7%	28,587	56,493	33.6%	66.4%
Luton	66.2%	36,708	47,773	43.5%	56.5%
Maldon	79.1%	14,529	24,302	37.4%	62.6%
Mid Suffolk	78.1%	27,391	33,794	44.8%	55.2%
North Hertfordshire	78.2%	42,234	35,438	54.4%	45.6%
North Norfolk	76.8%	26,214	37,576	41.1%	58.9%
Norwich	69.1%	37,326	29,040	56.2%	43.8%
Peterborough	72.3%	34,176	53,216	39.1%	60.9%
Rochford	78.8%	17,510	34,937	33.4%	66.6%
South Cambridgeshire	81.2%	56,128	37,061	60.2%	39.8%
Southend-on-Sea	72.8%	39,348	54,522	41.9%	58.1%
South Norfolk	78.5%	38,817	41,541	48.3%	51.7%
St Albans	82.4%	54,208	32,237	62.7%	37.3%
St. Edmundsbury	76.7%	26,986	35,224	43.4%	56.6%
Stevenage	73.7%	18,659	27,126	40.8%	59.2%
Suffolk Coastal	80.6%	37,218	41,966	47.0%	53.0%
Tendring	74.4%	25,210	57,447	30.5%	69.5%
Three Rivers	78.4%	25,751	27,097	48.7%	51.3%
Thurrock	72.7%	22,151	57,765	27.7%	72.3%
Uttlesford	80.2%	25,619	26,324	49.3%	50.7%
Watford	71.6%	23,167	23,419	49.7%	50.3%
Waveney	72.6%	24,356	41,290	37.1%	62.9%
Welwyn Hatfield	75.0%	27,550	31,060	47.0%	53.0%

=== Greater London ===
Voting areas of the London region Leave Remain

2016 United Kingdom European Union membership referendum (Greater London)
Choice	Votes	%
Leave the European Union	1,513,232	40.07
Remain a member of the European Union	2,263,519	59.93
Total	3,776,751	100.00
Valid votes	3,776,751	99.88
Invalid/blank votes	4,453	0.12
Total votes	3,781,204	100.00
Registered voters/turnout	5,424,768	69.70
Source: Electoral Commission

Greater London referendum results (without spoiled ballots):
Leave: 1,513,232 (40.1%)	Remain: 2,263,519 (59.9%)
▲

The Greater London region was broken down into 33 voting areas.

London borough	Voter turnout, of eligible	Votes		Proportion of votes	
London borough	Voter turnout, of eligible	Remain	Leave	Remain	Leave
Barking and Dagenham	63.8%	27,750	46,130	37.6%	62.4%
Barnet	72.1%	100,210	60,823	62.2%	37.8%
Bexley	75.2%	47,603	80,886	37.0%	63.0%
Brent	65.0%	72,523	48,881	59.7%	40.3%
Bromley	78.8%	92,398	90,034	50.6%	49.4%
Camden	65.4%	71,295	23,838	74.9%	25.1%
City of London	73.5%	3,312	1,087	75.3%	24.7%
City of Westminster	64.9%	53,928	24,268	69.0%	31.0%
Croydon	69.8%	92,913	78,221	54.3%	45.7%
Ealing	70.0%	90,024	59,017	60.4%	39.6%
Enfield	69.0%	76,425	60,481	55.8%	44.2%
Greenwich	69.5%	65,248	52,117	55.6%	44.4%
Hackney	65.1%	83,398	22,868	78.5%	21.5%
Haringey	70.5%	79,991	25,855	75.6%	24.4%
Harrow	72.2%	64,042	53,183	54.6%	45.4%
Hammersmith and Fulham	69.9%	56,188	24,054	70.0%	30.0%
Havering	76.0%	42,201	96,885	30.3%	69.7%
Hillingdon	68.9%	58,040	74,982	43.6%	56.4%
Hounslow	69.7%	58,755	56,321	51.1%	48.9%
Islington	70.3%	76,420	25,180	75.2%	24.8%
Kensington and Chelsea	65.9%	37,601	17,138	68.7%	31.3%
Kingston upon Thames	78.3%	52,533	32,737	61.6%	38.4%
Lambeth	67.3%	111,584	30,340	78.6%	21.4%
Lewisham	63.0%	86,955	37,518	69.9%	30.1%
Merton	73.4%	63,003	37,097	62.9%	37.1%
Newham	59.2%	55,328	49,371	52.8%	47.2%
Redbridge	67.5%	69,213	59,020	54.0%	46.0%
Richmond upon Thames	82.0%	75,396	33,410	69.3%	30.7%
Southwark	66.1%	94,293	35,209	72.8%	27.2%
Sutton	76.0%	49,319	57,241	46.3%	53.7%
Tower Hamlets	64.5%	73,011	35,224	67.5%	32.5%
Waltham Forest	66.6%	64,156	44,395	59.1%	40.9%
Wandsworth	71.9%	118,463	39,421	75.0%	25.0%

=== North East England ===
Voting areas of the North East England region Leave Remain

2016 United Kingdom European Union membership referendum (North East England)
Choice	Votes	%
Leave the European Union	778,103	58.04
Remain a member of the European Union	562,595	41.96
Total	1,340,698	100.00
Valid votes	1,340,698	99.95
Invalid/blank votes	689	0.05
Total votes	1,341,387	100.00
Registered voters/turnout	1,934,341	69.35
Source: Electoral Commission

North East England referendum results (without spoiled ballots):
Leave: 778,103 (58%)	Remain: 562,595 (42%)
▲

The North East England region was broken down into 12 voting areas.

District	Voter turnout, of eligible	Votes		Proportion of votes	
District	Voter turnout, of eligible	Remain	Leave	Remain	Leave
Darlington	71.0%	24,172	30,994	43.8%	56.2%
County Durham	68.7%	113,521	153,877	42.5%	57.5%
Gateshead	70.6%	44,429	58,529	43.2%	57.8%
Hartlepool	65.5%	14,029	32,071	30.4%	69.6%
Middlesbrough	64.9%	21,181	40,177	34.5%	65.5%
Newcastle upon Tyne	67.6%	65,405	63,598	50.7%	49.3%
North Tyneside	72.3%	52,873	60,589	46.6%	53.4%
Northumberland	74.3%	82,022	96,699	45.9%	54.1%
Redcar and Cleveland	70.2%	24,586	48,128	33.8%	66.2%
South Tyneside	68.2%	30,014	49,065	38.0%	62.0%
Stockton-on-Tees	71.0%	38,433	61,982	38.3%	61.7%
Sunderland	64.8%	51,930	82,394	38.7%	61.3%

=== North West England ===
Voting areas of the North West England region Leave Remain

2016 United Kingdom European Union membership referendum (North West England)
Choice	Votes	%
Leave the European Union	1,966,925	53.65
Remain a member of the European Union	1,699,020	46.35
Total	3,665,945	100.00
Valid votes	3,665,945	99.93
Invalid/blank votes	2,682	0.07
Total votes	3,668,627	100.00
Registered voters/turnout	5,241,568	69.99
Source: Electoral Commission

North West England referendum results (without spoiled ballots):
Leave: 1,966,925 (53.7%)	Remain: 1,699,020 (46.3%)
▲

The North West England region was broken down into 39 voting areas.

District	Voter turnout, of eligible	Votes		Proportion of votes	
District	Voter turnout, of eligible	Remain	Leave	Remain	Leave
Allerdale	72.9%	22,429	31,809	41.4%	58.6%
Barrow-in-Furness	67.8%	14,207	21,867	39.4%	60.6%
Blackburn with Darwen	65.2%	28,522	36,799	43.7%	56.3%
Blackpool	65.4%	21,781	45,146	32.5%	67.5%
Bolton	70.1%	57,589	80,491	41.7%	58.3%
Burnley	67.2%	14,462	28,854	33.4%	66.6%
Bury	71.3%	46,354	54,674	45.9%	54.1%
Carlisle	74.5%	23,788	35,895	39.9%	60.1%
Cheshire East	77.3%	107,962	113,163	48.8%	51.2%
Cheshire West and Chester	74.5%	95,455	98,082	49.3%	50.7%
Chorley	75.5%	27,417	36,098	43.2%	56.8%
Copeland	70.0%	14,419	23,528	38.0%	62.0%
Eden	75.7%	14,807	16,911	46.7%	53.3%
Fylde	75.5%	19,889	26,317	43.0%	57.0%
Halton	68.2%	27,678	37,327	42.6%	57.4%
Hyndburn	64.7%	13,569	26,568	33.8%	66.2%
Knowsley	63.5%	34,345	36,558	48.4%	51.6%
Lancaster	72.6%	35,732	37,309	48.9%	51.1%
Liverpool	64.0%	118,453	85,101	58.2%	41.8%
Manchester	59.7%	121,823	79,991	60.4%	39.6%
Oldham	67.9%	42,034	65,369	39.1%	60.9%
Pendle	70.2%	16,704	28,631	36.8%	63.2%
Preston	68.7%	30,227	34,518	46.7%	53.3%
Ribble Valley	79.0%	15,892	20,550	43.6%	56.4%
Rochdale	65.9%	41,217	62,014	39.9%	60.1%
Rossendale	72.4%	15,012	23,169	39.3%	60.7%
Salford	63.2%	47,430	62,385	43.2%	56.8%
Sefton	71.7%	76,702	71,176	51.9%	48.1%
South Lakeland	79.7%	34,531	30,800	52.9%	47.1%
South Ribble	75.3%	26,406	37,318	41.4%	58.6%
St. Helens	68.8%	39,322	54,357	42.0%	58.0%
Stockport	74.9%	85,559	77,930	52.5%	47.5%
Tameside	66.0%	43,118	67,829	38.9%	61.1%
Trafford	75.8%	72,293	53,018	57.7%	42.3%
Warrington	73.3%	52,657	62,487	45.7%	54.3%
West Lancashire	74.4%	28,546	35,323	44.7%	55.3%
Wigan	69.2%	58,942	104,331	36.1%	63.9%
Wirral	70.9%	88,931	83,069	51.7%	48.3%
Wyre	74.6%	22,816	40,163	36.2%	63.8%

=== South East England ===
Voting areas of the South East England region Leave Remain

2016 United Kingdom European Union membership referendum (South East England)
Choice	Votes	%
Leave the European Union	2,567,965	51.78
Remain a member of the European Union	2,391,718	48.22
Total	4,959,683	100.00
Valid votes	4,959,683	99.93
Invalid/blank votes	3,427	0.07
Total votes	4,963,110	100.00
Registered voters/turnout	6,465,404	76.76
Source: Electoral Commission

South East England referendum results (without spoiled ballots):
Leave: 2,567,965 (51.8%)	Remain: 2,391,718 (48.2%)
▲

The South East England region was broken down into 67 voting areas.

District	Voter turnout, of eligible	Votes		Proportion of votes	
District	Voter turnout, of eligible	Remain	Leave	Remain	Leave
Adur	76.4%	16,914	20,315	45.4%	54.6%
Arun	77.8%	34,193	56,936	37.5%	62.5%
Ashford	77.1%	28,314	41,472	40.6%	59.4%
Aylesbury Vale	78.4%	52,877	53,956	49.5%	50.5%
Basingstoke and Deane	78.0%	48,257	52,071	48.1%	51.9%
Bracknell Forest	76.1%	29,888	35,002	46.1%	53.9%
Brighton and Hove	74.0%	100,648	46,027	68.6%	31.4%
Canterbury	75.0%	40,169	41,879	49.0%	51.0%
Cherwell	75.5%	40,668	41,168	49.7%	50.3%
Chichester	77.8%	35,011	36,326	49.1%	50.9%
Chiltern	83.5%	32,241	26,363	55.0%	45.0%
Crawley	73.2%	22,388	31,447	41.6%	58.4%
Dartford	75.5%	19,985	35,870	35.8%	64.2%
Dover	76.5%	24,606	40,410	37.8%	62.2%
Eastbourne	74.7%	22,845	30,700	42.7%	57.3%
Eastleigh	78.2%	36,172	39,902	47.5%	52.5%
East Hampshire	81.6%	37,346	36,576	50.5%	49.5%
Elmbridge	78.1%	45,841	31,162	59.5%	40.5%
Epsom and Ewell	80.4%	23,596	21,707	52.1%	47.9%
Fareham	79.6%	32,210	39,525	44.9%	55.1%
Gosport	73.5%	16,671	29,456	36.1%	63.9%
Gravesham	74.9%	18,876	35,643	34.6%	65.4%
Guildford	76.9%	44,155	34,458	56.2%	43.8%
Hart	82.6%	30,282	27,513	52.4%	47.6%
Hastings	71.6%	20,011	24,339	45.1%	54.9%
Havant	74.1%	26,582	44,047	37.6%	62.4%
Horsham	81.6%	43,785	41,303	51.5%	48.5%
Isle of Wight	72.3%	30,207	49,173	38.1%	61.9%
Lewes	77.8%	30,974	28,508	52.1%	47.9%
Maidstone	76.0%	36,762	52,365	41.2%	58.8%
Medway	72.1%	49,889	88,997	35.9%	64.1%
Mid Sussex	80.7%	46,471	41,057	53.1%	46.9%
Milton Keynes	73.6%	63,393	67,063	48.6%	51.4%
Mole Valley	82.1%	29,088	25,708	53.1%	46.9%
New Forest	79.2%	47,199	64,541	42.2%	57.8%
Oxford	72.3%	49,424	20,913	70.3%	29.7%
Portsmouth	70.3%	41,384	57,336	41.9%	58.1%
Reading	72.5%	43,385	31,382	58.0%	42.0%
Reigate and Banstead	78.2%	40,181	40,980	49.5%	50.5%
Rother	79.3%	23,916	33,753	41.5%	58.5%
Runnymede	76.0%	20,259	24,035	45.7%	54.3%
Rushmoor	74.1%	20,384	28,396	41.8%	58.2%
Sevenoaks	80.6%	32,091	38,258	45.6%	54.4%
Shepway	74.9%	22,884	37,729	37.8%	62.2%
Slough	62.1%	24,911	29,631	45.7%	54.3%
Southampton	68.1%	49,738	57,927	46.2%	53.8%
South Bucks	78.0%	20,077	20,647	49.3%	50.7%
South Oxfordshire	80.7%	46,245	37,865	55.0%	45.0%
Spelthorne	77.9%	22,474	34,135	39.7%	60.3%
Surrey Heath	79.8%	25,638	26,667	49.0%	51.0%
Swale	74.2%	28,481	47,388	37.5%	62.5%
Tandridge	80.3%	24,251	27,169	47.2%	52.8%
Test Valley	79.6%	36,170	39,091	48.1%	51.9%
Thanet	72.7%	26,065	46,037	36.2%	63.8%
Tonbridge and Malling	79.6%	32,792	41,229	44.3%	55.7%
Tunbridge Wells	79.1%	35,676	29,320	54.9%	45.1%
Vale of White Horse	81.1%	43,462	33,192	56.7%	43.3%
Waverley	82.3%	44,341	31,601	58.4%	41.6%
Wealden	80.0%	44,084	52,808	45.5%	54.5%
West Berkshire	79.9%	48,300	44,977	51.8%	48.2%
West Oxfordshire	79.7%	35,236	30,435	53.7%	46.3%
Winchester	81.2%	42,878	29,886	58.9%	41.1%
Windsor and Maidenhead	79.7%	44,086	37,706	53.9%	46.1%
Woking	77.4%	31,007	24,214	56.2%	43.8%
Wokingham	79.2%	55,272	42,229	56.7%	43.3%
Worthing	75.4%	28,851	32,515	47.0%	53.0%
Wycombe	75.7%	49,261	45,529	52.0%	48.0%

=== South West England (including Gibraltar) ===
Voting areas of the South West England region (together with Gibraltar) Leave Remain

2016 United Kingdom European Union membership referendum (South West England) (including Gibraltar)
Choice	Votes	%
Leave the European Union	1,669,711	52.63
Remain a member of the European Union	1,503,019	47.37
Total	3,172,730	100.00
Valid votes	3,172,730	99.93
Invalid/blank votes	2,179	0.07
Total votes	3,174,909	100.00
Registered voters/turnout	4,138,134	76.72
Source: Electoral Commission

South West England (including Gibraltar) referendum results (without spoiled ballots):
Leave: 1,669,711 (52.6%)	Remain: 1,503,019 (47.4%)
▲

The South West England region was broken down into 38 voting areas.

District	Voter turnout, of eligible	Votes		Proportion of votes	
District	Voter turnout, of eligible	Remain	Leave	Remain	Leave
Bath and North East Somerset	77.1%	60,878	44,352	57.9%	42.1%
Bournemouth	69.2%	41,473	50,453	45.1%	54.9%
Bristol	73.1%	141,027	87,418	61.7%	38.3%
Cheltenham	75.8%	37,081	28,932	56.2%	43.8%
Christchurch	79.3%	12,782	18,268	41.2%	58.8%
Cornwall	77.0%	140,540	182,665	43.5%	56.5%
Cotswold	79.8%	28,015	26,806	51.1%	48.9%
East Devon	78.9%	40,743	48,040	45.9%	54.1%
East Dorset	81.3%	24,786	33,702	42.4%	57.6%
Exeter	73.8%	35,270	28,533	55.3%	44.7%
Forest of Dean	77.4%	21,392	30,251	41.4%	58.6%
Gloucester	72.0%	26,801	37,776	41.5%	58.5%
Isles of Scilly	79.2%	803	621	56.4%	43.6%
Mendip	76.9%	33,427	32,028	51.1%	48.9%
Mid Devon	79.3%	22,400	25,606	46.7%	53.3%
North Dorset	79.7%	18,399	23,802	43.6%	56.4%
North Devon	76.8%	24,931	33,100	43.0%	57.0%
North Somerset	77.4%	59,572	64,976	47.8%	52.2%
Plymouth	71.4%	53,458	79,997	40.1%	59.9%
Poole	75.3%	35,741	49,707	41.8%	58.2%
Purbeck	78.9%	11,754	16,966	40.9%	59.1%
Sedgemoor	76.3%	26,545	41,869	38.8%	61.2%
South Gloucestershire	76.2%	74,928	83,405	47.3%	52.7%
South Hams	80.2%	29,308	26,142	52.9%	47.1%
South Somerset	78.6%	42,527	56,940	42.8%	57.2%
Stroud	80.0%	40,446	33,618	54.6%	45.4%
Swindon	75.8%	51,220	61,745	45.3%	54.7%
Taunton Deane	78.1%	30,944	34,789	47.1%	52.9%
Teignbridge	79.3%	37,949	44,363	46.1%	53.9%
Tewkesbury	79.1%	25,084	28,568	46.8%	53.2%
Torbay	73.6%	27,935	47,889	36.8%	63.2%
Torridge	78.3%	16,229	25,200	39.2%	60.8%
West Dorset	79.4%	31,924	33,267	49.0%	51.0%
West Devon	81.2%	16,658	18,937	46.8%	53.2%
West Somerset	79.1%	8,566	13,168	39.4%	60.6%
Wiltshire	78.8%	137,258	151,637	47.5%	52.5%
Weymouth and Portland	75.8%	14,903	23,352	39.0%	61.0%

==== Gibraltar ====
For the purposes of this referendum and as had been the case with previous European Parliamentary elections, the overseas territory of Gibraltar was a single voting area placed in the South West England constituency. It is the first time the territory has taken part in any UK-wide referendum as it did not participate in either the original 1975 EC Referendum or the 2011 AV Referendum as Gibraltar does not send any Members of Parliament to the House of Commons in Westminster.

Overseas Territory	Voter turnout, of eligible	Votes		Proportion of votes	
Overseas Territory	Voter turnout, of eligible	Remain	Leave	Remain	Leave
Gibraltar	83.6%	19,322	823	95.9%	4.1%

=== West Midlands ===
Voting areas of the West Midlands region Leave Remain

2016 United Kingdom European Union membership referendum (West Midlands)
Choice	Votes	%
Leave the European Union	1,755,687	59.26
Remain a member of the European Union	1,207,175	40.74
Total	2,962,862	100.00
Valid votes	2,962,862	99.92
Invalid/blank votes	2,507	0.08
Total votes	2,965,369	100.00
Registered voters/turnout	4,116,572	72.03
Source: Electoral Commission

West Midlands referendum results (without spoiled ballots):
Leave: 1,755,687 (59.3%)	Remain: 1,207,175 (40.7%)
▲

The West Midlands region was broken down into 30 voting areas.

District	Voter turnout, of eligible	Votes		Proportion of votes	
District	Voter turnout, of eligible	Remain	Leave	Remain	Leave
Birmingham	63.7%	223,451	227,251	49.6%	50.4%
Bromsgrove	79.3%	26,252	32,563	44.6%	55.4%
Cannock Chase	71.4%	16,684	36,894	31.1%	68.9%
Coventry	69.2%	67,967	85,097	44.4%	55.6%
Dudley	71.7%	56,780	118,446	32.4%	67.6%
East Staffordshire	74.3%	22,850	39,266	36.8%	63.2%
Herefordshire	78.3%	44,148	64,122	40.8%	59.2%
Lichfield	78.7%	26,064	37,214	41.2%	58.8%
Malvern Hills	80.5%	23,203	25,294	47.8%	52.2%
Newcastle-under-Lyme	74.3%	25,477	43,457	37.0%	63.0%
North Warwickshire	76.2%	12,569	25,385	33.1%	66.9%
Nuneaton and Bedworth	74.3%	23,736	46,095	34.0%	66.0%
Redditch	75.2%	17,303	28,579	37.7%	62.3%
Rugby	79.0%	25,350	33,199	43.3%	56.7%
Sandwell	66.5%	49,004	98,250	33.3%	66.7%
Shropshire	77.3%	78,987	104,166	43.1%	56.9%
Solihull	76.0%	53,466	68,484	43.8%	56.2%
South Staffordshire	77.8%	23,444	43,248	35.2%	64.8%
Stafford	77.8%	34,098	43,386	44.0%	56.0%
Staffordshire Moorlands	75.3%	21,076	38,684	35.3%	64.7%
Stoke-on-Trent	65.7%	36,027	81,563	30.6%	69.4%
Stratford-on-Avon	80.8%	38,341	40,817	48.4%	51.6%
Tamworth	74.1%	13,705	28,424	32.5%	67.5%
Telford and Wrekin	72.1%	32,954	56,649	36.8%	63.2%
Walsall	69.6%	43,572	92,007	32.1%	67.9%
Warwick	79.2%	47,976	33,642	58.8%	41.2%
Wolverhampton	67.5%	44,138	73,798	37.4%	62.6%
Worcester	73.8%	25,125	29,114	46.3%	53.7%
Wychavon	80.8%	32,188	44,201	42.1%	57.9%
Wyre Forest	74.0%	21,240	36,392	36.9%	63.1%

=== Yorkshire and the Humber ===
Voting areas of the Yorkshire and the Humber region Leave Remain

2016 United Kingdom European Union membership referendum (Yorkshire and the Humber)
Choice	Votes	%
Leave the European Union	1,580,937	57.71
Remain a member of the European Union	1,158,298	42.29
Total	2,739,235	100.00
Valid votes	2,739,235	99.93
Invalid/blank votes	1,937	0.07
Total votes	2,741,172	100.00
Registered voters/turnout	3,877,780	70.69
Source: Electoral Commission

Yorkshire and the Humber referendum results (without spoiled ballots):
Leave: 1,580,937 (57.7%)	Remain: 1,158,298 (42.3%)
▲

The Yorkshire and the Humber region was broken down into 21 voting areas.

District	Voter turnout, of eligible	Votes		Proportion of votes	
District	Voter turnout, of eligible	Remain	Leave	Remain	Leave
Barnsley	69.9%	38,951	83,958	31.7%	68.3%
Bradford	66.7%	104,575	123,913	45.8%	54.2%
Calderdale	71.0%	46,950	58,975	44.3%	55.7%
Craven	81.0%	16,930	18,961	47.2%	52.8%
Doncaster	69.5%	46,922	104,260	31.0%	69.0%
East Riding of Yorkshire	74.9%	78,779	120,136	39.6%	60.4%
Hambleton	78.4%	25,480	29,502	46.3%	53.7%
Harrogate	78.8%	48,211	46,374	51.0%	49.0%
Kingston upon Hull	62.9%	36,709	76,646	32.4%	67.6%
Kirklees	70.8%	98,485	118,755	45.3%	54.7%
Leeds	71.3%	194,863	192,474	50.3%	49.7%
North East Lincolnshire	67.9%	23,797	55,185	30.1%	69.9%
North Lincolnshire	71.9%	29,947	58,915	33.7%	66.3%
Richmondshire	75.1%	11,945	15,691	43.2%	56.8%
Rotherham	69.5%	44,115	93,272	32.1%	67.9%
Ryedale	77.2%	14,340	17,710	44.7%	55.3%
Scarborough	73.0%	22,999	37,512	38.0%	62.0%
Selby	79.1%	21,071	30,532	40.8%	59.2%
Sheffield	67.3%	130,735	136,018	49.0%	51.0%
Wakefield	71.1%	58,877	116,165	33.6%	66.4%
York	70.6%	63,617	45,983	58.0%	42.0%

== Northern Ireland ==
Northern Ireland was a single voting area, as well as being a regional count although local totals were announced in each of the Westminster parliamentary constituency areas within Northern Ireland.

Northern Ireland Leave Remain

2016 United Kingdom European Union membership referendum (Northern Ireland)
Choice	Votes	%
Leave the European Union	349,442	44.22
Remain a member of the European Union	440,707	55.78
Total	790,149	100.00
Valid votes	790,149	99.95
Invalid/blank votes	374	0.05
Total votes	790,523	100.00
Registered voters/turnout	1,260,955	62.69
Source: Electoral Commission

Northern Ireland referendum results (without spoiled ballots):
Leave: 349,442 (44.2%)	Remain: 470,707 (55.8%)
▲

Northern Ireland local totals by Parliamentary constituencies.

Constituency	Voter turnout, of eligible	Votes		Proportion of votes	
Constituency	Voter turnout, of eligible	Remain	Leave	Remain	Leave
Belfast East	65.8%	20,728	21,918	48.6%	51.4%
Belfast North	57.5%	20,128	19,844	50.4%	49.6%
Belfast South	67.6%	30,960	13,596	69.5%	30.5%
Belfast West	48.9%	23,099	8,092	74.1%	25.9%
East Antrim	65.2%	18,616	22,929	44.8%	55.2%
East Londonderry	59.7%	21,098	19,455	52.0%	48.0%
Fermanagh and South Tyrone	67.8%	28,200	19,958	58.6%	41.4%
Foyle	57.4%	32,064	8,905	78.3%	21.7%
Lagan Valley	66.6%	22,710	25,704	46.9%	53.1%
Mid Ulster	61.6%	25,612	16,799	60.4%	39.6%
Newry and Armagh	63.9%	31,963	18,659	63.1%	36.9%
North Antrim	64.9%	18,782	30,938	37.8%	62.2%
North Down	67.7%	23,131	21,046	52.4%	47.6%
South Antrim	63.1%	21,498	22,055	49.4%	50.6%
South Down	62.2%	32,076	15,625	67.2%	32.8%
Strangford	64.5%	18,727	23,383	44.5%	55.5%
Upper Bann	63.6%	24,550	27,262	47.4%	52.6%
West Tyrone	61.8%	26,765	13,274	66.8%	33.2%

== Scotland ==
Voting areas of Scotland Remain

The Scottish council areas were used as the voting areas for the referendum throughout Scotland.

2016 United Kingdom European Union membership referendum (Scotland)
Choice	Votes	%
Leave the European Union	1,018,322	38.00
Remain a member of the European Union	1,661,191	62.00
Total	2,679,513	100.00
Valid votes	2,679,513	99.94
Invalid/blank votes	1,666	0.06
Total votes	2,681,179	100.00
Registered voters/turnout	3,987,112	67.25
Source: Electoral Commission

Scotland referendum results (without spoiled ballots):
Leave: 1,018,322 (38%)	Remain: 1,661,191 (62%)
▲

Scotland was broken down into 32 voting areas.

Council area	Voter turnout, of eligible	Votes		Proportion of votes	
Council area	Voter turnout, of eligible	Remain	Leave	Remain	Leave
Aberdeen City	67.9%	63,985	40,729	61.1%	38.9%
Aberdeenshire	70.6%	76,445	62,516	55.0%	45.0%
Angus	68.0%	32,747	26,511	55.3%	44.7%
Argyll and Bute	73.1%	29,494	19,202	60.6%	39.4%
Clackmannanshire	67.2%	14,691	10,736	57.8%	42.2%
Dumfries and Galloway	71.4%	43,864	38,803	53.1%	46.9%
Dundee City	62.9%	39,688	26,697	59.8%	40.2%
East Ayrshire	62.9%	33,891	23,942	58.6%	41.4%
East Dunbartonshire	75.1%	44,534	17,840	71.4%	28.6%
East Lothian	71.7%	36,026	19,738	64.6%	35.4%
East Renfrewshire	76.1%	39,345	13,596	74.3%	25.7%
City of Edinburgh	72.9%	187,796	64,498	74.4%	25.6%
Falkirk	67.5%	44,987	34,271	56.8%	43.2%
Fife	66.7%	106,754	75,466	58.6%	41.4%
Glasgow City	56.2%	168,335	84,474	66.6%	33.4%
Highland	71.6%	70,308	55,349	56.0%	44.0%
Inverclyde	66.0%	24,688	14,010	63.8%	36.2%
Midlothian	68.1%	28,217	17,251	62.1%	37.9%
Moray	67.4%	24,114	23,992	50.1%	49.9%
North Ayrshire	64.6%	38,394	29,110	56.9%	43.1%
North Lanarkshire	60.9%	95,549	59,400	61.7%	38.3%
Perth and Kinross	73.7%	49,641	31,614	61.1%	38.9%
Renfrewshire	69.2%	57,119	31,010	64.8%	35.2%
Scottish Borders	73.4%	37,952	26,962	58.5%	41.5%
Stirling	74.0%	33,112	15,787	67.7%	32.3%
South Lanarkshire	65.3%	102,568	60,024	63.1%	36.9%
South Ayrshire	69.8%	36,265	25,241	59.0%	41.0%
West Dunbartonshire	63.9%	26,794	16,426	62.0%	38.0%
West Lothian	67.6%	51,560	36,948	58.3%	41.7%
Na h-Eileanan Siar (Western Isles)	70.1%	8,232	6,671	55.2%	44.8%
Orkney	68.3%	7,189	4,193	63.2%	36.8%
Shetland	70.3%	6,907	5,315	56.5%	43.5%

While all council counting areas showed a majority to remain, one constituency, Banff and Buchan, voted to leave by an estimated ratio of 54% to 46%. Voting to leave the EU was most concentrated around the north coast of Aberdeenshire between the fishing towns of Banff and Peterhead, where there were 23,707 Leave votes to 14,918 Remain votes (61% Leave 39% Remain).

The areas of Whalsay and South Unst in the Shetland Islands and An Taobh Siar and Nis in Na h-Eileanan an Iar (The Western Isles) also voted by a majority for Leave, as did the town of Lossiemouth in Moray.

== Wales ==
Voting areas of Wales Leave Remain

The Welsh council areas were used as the voting areas for the referendum throughout Wales.

A total of 650,000 inhabitants born in England live in Wales (21%), with the areas with the highest percentages voting to leave. The majority to leave the EU was 82,000. The map shows council areas comprising ex-heavy industrial places and English-speaking as a common preference as areas where Leave won out. Parts of rural Wales also saw a leave-vote majority (but also Anglesey where Welsh is just as commonly if not more usually spoken). Cardiff, the Plaid Cymru heartland of the two council areas in West Wales, and by wafer-thin margins affluent Monmouthshire and the Vale of Glamorgan were the areas where Remain held sway.

2016 United Kingdom European Union membership referendum (Wales/Cymru)
Choice	Votes	%
Leave the European Union; Gadael yr Undeb Ewropeaidd	854,572	52.53
Remain a member of the European Union; Aros yn aelod o'r Undeb Ewropeaidd	772,347	47.47
Total	1,626,919	100.00
Valid votes	1,626,919	99.93
Invalid/blank votes	1,135	0.07
Total votes	1,628,054	100.00
Registered voters/turnout	2,270,272	71.71
Source: Electoral Commission

Note: In Wales under the Welsh Language Act 1993 the Welsh language has equal status with the English language.

Wales referendum results (without spoiled ballots):
Leave/Gadael: 854,572 (52.5%)	Remain/Aros: 772,347 (47.5%)
▲

Wales was broken down into 22 voting areas.

Council area	Voter turnout, of eligible	Votes		Proportion of votes	
Council area	Voter turnout, of eligible	Remain/Aros	Leave/Gadael	Remain/Aros	Leave/Gadael
Anglesey	73.8%	18,618	19,333	49.1%	50.9%
Blaenau Gwent	68.1%	13,215	21,587	38.0%	62.0%
Bridgend	71.1%	33,723	40,622	45.4%	54.6%
Caerphilly	70.7%	39,178	53,295	42.4%	57.6%
Cardiff	69.6%	101,788	67,816	60.0%	40.0%
Carmarthenshire	74.0%	47,654	55,381	46.3%	53.7%
Ceredigion	74.4%	21,711	18,031	54.6%	45.4%
Conwy	71.7%	30,147	35,357	46.0%	54.0%
Denbighshire	69.1%	23,955	28,117	46.0%	54.0%
Flintshire	74.8%	37,867	48,930	43.6%	56.4%
Gwynedd	72.3%	35,517	25,665	58.1%	41.9%
Merthyr Tydfil	67.4%	12,574	16,291	43.6%	56.4%
Monmouthshire	77.7%	28,061	27,569	50.4%	49.6%
Neath Port Talbot	71.5%	32,651	43,001	43.2%	56.8%
Newport	70.2%	32,413	41,236	44.0%	56.0%
Pembrokeshire	74.4%	29,367	39,155	42.9%	57.1%
Powys	77.0%	36,762	42,707	46.3%	53.7%
Rhondda Cynon Taf	67.4%	53,973	62,590	46.3%	53.7%
Swansea	69.5%	58,307	61,936	48.5%	51.5%
Torfaen	69.8%	19,363	28,781	40.2%	59.8%
Vale of Glamorgan	76.1%	36,681	35,628	50.7%	49.3%
Wrexham	71.5%	28,822	41,544	41.0%	59.0%

== Results by constituency ==
Results map by constituency

The vote was not counted by Commons seat except in Northern Ireland. Some local councils (districts) republished local results by electoral ward or constituency. Some constituencies are coterminous with (overlap) their local government district. For the others Dr Chris Hanretty, a Reader in Politics at the University of East Anglia, estimated through a demographic model the 'Leave' and 'Remain' vote. Hanretty urges caution in the interpretation of the data as the estimates have a margin of error.

=== Estimated net preference of constituencies by party of the incumbent ===
Party	Remain	Leave	Remain %	Leave %
Conservative Party	80	247	24%	76%
Labour Party	84	148	36%	64%
SNP	55	1	98%	2%
Liberal Democrats	6	2	75%	25%
DUP	2	6	25%	75%
Sinn Féin	4	0	100%	0%
Plaid Cymru	2	1	67%	33%
Social Democratic and Labour Party	3	0	100%	0%
Independent	1	1	50%	50%
Ulster Unionist Party	1	1	50%	50%
Green Party	1	0	100%	0%
Speaker	1	0	100%	0%
Total	242	406	37%	63%

Please note that this table does not show how each party's traditional voters voted in the referendum. It shows the estimated (or actual) net decision in 648 of the 650 seats and the incumbents reflect those returned at the 2015 general election.

=== List of constituency results ===
While votes were tallied by district, there were two sources of by constituency result available within a short time of the referendum – firstly a model by Chris Hanretty, based on the published results by district, and secondly 82 results calculated by the BBC based on ward results obtained from the local authorities.

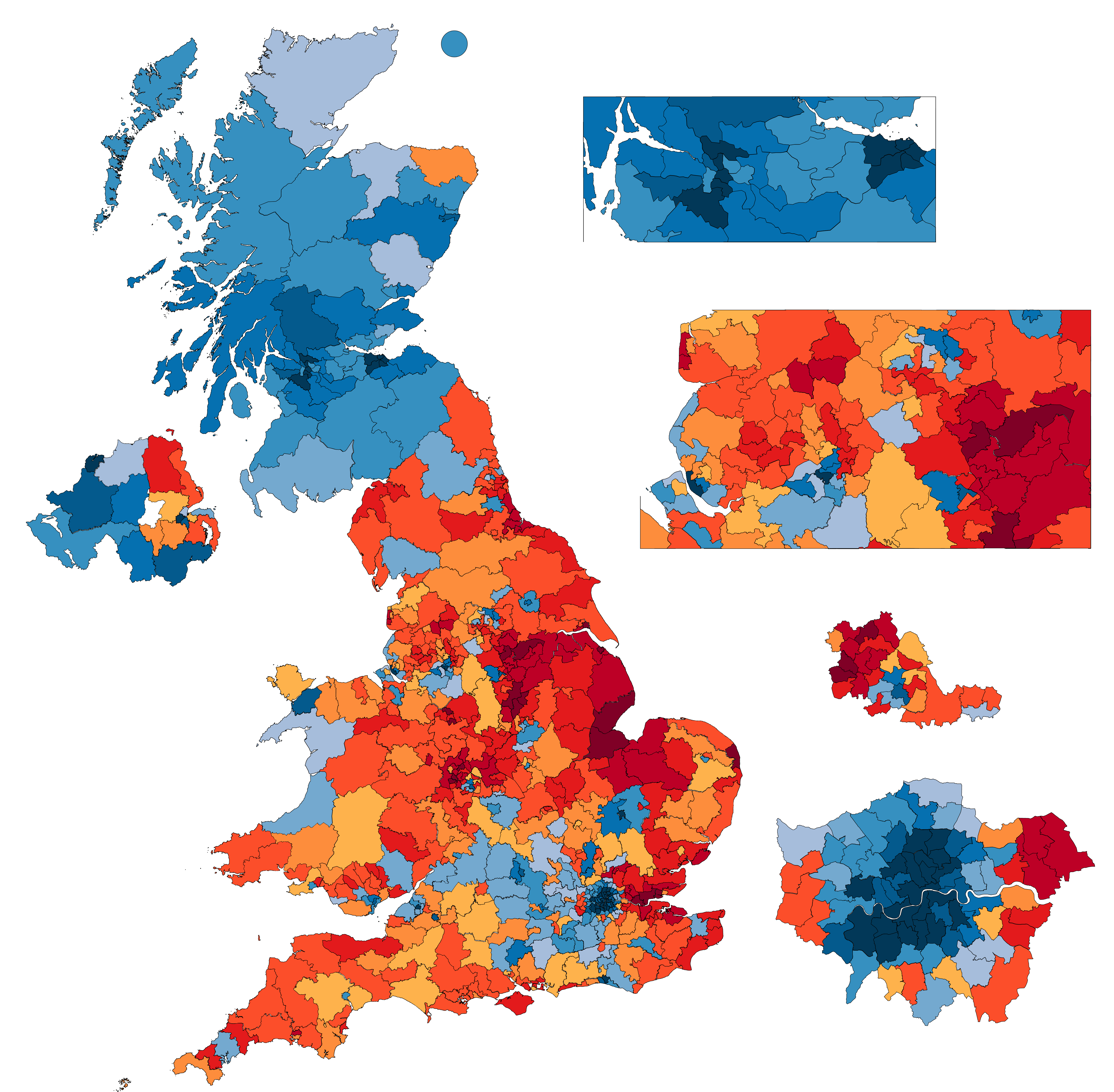
Results of the 2016 EU Referendum by constituency (incl. estimates) Leave >70% Leave 65% to 70% Leave 60% to 65% Leave 55% to 60% Leave 52% to 55% Leave <52% Remain <52% Remain 52% to 55% Remain 55% to 60% Remain 60% to 65% Remain 65% to 70% Remain >70%

In the following table, Hanretty's results are marked with "(est.)".

Constituency	Leave	Remain
Boston and Skegness	75.65%	24.35%(est.)
Walsall North	74.19%	25.81%
Clacton	73.04%	26.96%(est.)
South Basildon and East Thurrock	73%	27%(est.)
Kingston upon Hull East	72.83%	27.17%(est.)
Castle Point	72.7%	27.3%
Stoke-on-Trent North	72.12%	27.88%(est.)
Doncaster North	71.65%	28.35%(est.)
Great Yarmouth	71.5%	28.5%
Great Grimsby	71.45%	28.55%
Dudley North	71.43%	28.57%
Stoke-on-Trent South	71.11%	28.89%(est.)
South Holland and The Deepings	71.07%	28.93%(est.)
Barnsley East	70.98%	29.02%(est.)
Mansfield	70.86%	29.14%
Ashfield	70.47%	29.53%(est.)
Dudley South	70.42%	29.58%
Bolsover	70.39%	29.61%(est.)
Dagenham and Rainham	70.35%	29.65%(est.)
Wentworth and Dearne	70.28%	29.72%(est.)
Thurrock	70.26%	29.74%(est.)
Hartlepool	69.57%	30.43%
Cleethorpes	69.5%	30.5%(est.)
Hornchurch and Upminster	69.49%	30.51%
North East Cambridgeshire	69.35%	30.65%(est.)
Romford	69.29%	30.71%
Normanton, Pontefract and Castleford	69.26%	30.74%
Louth and Horncastle	68.9%	31.1%(est.)
Cannock Chase	68.86%	31.14%
Scunthorpe	68.68%	31.32%(est.)
West Bromwich West	68.67%	31.33%(est.)
Don Valley	68.49%	31.51%(est.)
Rotherham	68.35%	31.65%
Bassetlaw	68.32%	31.68%(est.)
Barnsley Central	68.19%	31.81%(est.)
West Bromwich East	68.18%	31.82%(est.)
Wolverhampton South East	68.14%	31.86%
Hemsworth	68.13%	31.87%
Kingston upon Hull West and Hessle	67.99%	32.01%(est.)
Blackpool South	67.81%	32.19%(est.)
Aldridge-Brownhills	67.8%	32.2%
North Warwickshire	67.76%	32.24%(est.)
Harlow	67.73%	32.27%(est.)
Wolverhampton North East	67.71%	32.29%
Redcar	67.67%	32.33%(est.)
Rayleigh and Wickford	67.65%	32.35%(est.)
Basildon and Billericay	67.14%	32.86%(est.)
Blackpool North and Cleveleys	66.91%	33.09%(est.)
Rother Valley	66.72%	33.28%
Doncaster Central	66.7%	33.3%(est.)
South West Norfolk	66.67%	33.33%(est.)
Burnley	66.61%	33.39%
Halesowen and Rowley Regis	66.59%	33.41%(est.)
Plymouth, Moor View	66.44%	33.56%
Stockton North	66.32%	33.68%(est.)
Sheffield South East	66.32%	33.68%(est.)
Brigg and Goole	66.23%	33.77%(est.)
Telford	66.19%	33.81%(est.)
Middlesbrough	66.08%	33.92%
Tamworth	65.99%	34.01%(est.)
Easington	65.96%	34.04%(est.)
Hyndburn	65.82%	34.18%(est.)
North West Norfolk	65.78%	34.22%(est.)
Broxbourne	65.53%	34.47%(est.)
Gravesham	65.38%	34.62%
Sittingbourne and Sheppey	65.36%	34.64%(est.)
Amber Valley	65.3%	34.7%(est.)
Middlesbrough South and East Cleveland	65.27%	34.73%(est.)
Bexleyheath and Crayford	65.26%	34.74%(est.)
South Staffordshire	65.24%	34.76%
North Thanet	65.18%	34.82%(est.)
Makerfield	64.91%	35.09%(est.)
Stoke-on-Trent Central	64.85%	35.15%(est.)
Burton	64.79%	35.21%(est.)
Bognor Regis and Littlehampton	64.79%	35.21%(est.)
Staffordshire Moorlands	64.69%	35.31%(est.)
Nuneaton	64.51%	35.49%(est.)
St Austell and Newquay	64.06%	35.94%(est.)
Dartford	63.98%	36.02%(est.)
Chatham and Aylesford	63.91%	36.09%(est.)
Nottingham North	63.81%	36.19%
Portsmouth North	63.69%	36.31%
Rochester and Strood	63.69%	36.31%
Stourbridge	63.66%	36.34%
East Yorkshire	63.66%	36.34%(est.)
Sherwood	63.66%	36.34%(est.)
Gillingham and Rainham	63.58%	36.42%
Bradford South	63.56%	36.44%
Waveney	63.41%	36.59%(est.)
Leigh	63.29%	36.71%(est.)
West Suffolk	63.25%	36.75%(est.)
Erewash	63.22%	36.78%(est.)
Pendle	63.15%	36.85%
Wyre Forest	63.15%	36.85%
Bolton South East	63.03%	36.97%(est.)
Wellingborough	63.02%	36.98%(est.)
Dover	63.01%	36.99%(est.)
Birmingham, Erdington	63%	37%
Wigan	62.96%	37.04%(est.)
Wakefield	62.77%	37.23%
Peterborough	62.68%	37.32%(est.)
Havant	62.62%	37.38%(est.)
Torbay	62.45%	37.55%(est.)
Houghton and Sunderland South	62.43%	37.57%
Old Bexley and Sidcup	62.43%	37.57%(est.)
Heywood and Middleton	62.43%	37.57%
North Antrim	62.22%	37.78%
Bridgwater and West Somerset	62.06%	37.94%(est.)
South Shields	62.05%	37.95%
North East Derbyshire	62.05%	37.95%(est.)
Blaenau Gwent	62.03%	37.97%
Gainsborough	61.96%	38.04%(est.)
Isle of Wight	61.95%	38.05%
Washington and Sunderland West	61.85%	38.15%
Gosport	61.82%	38.18%(est.)
Ashton-under-Lyne	61.81%	38.19%
Birmingham, Northfield	61.8%	38.2%
Swansea East	61.79%	38.21%(est.)
Jarrow	61.78%	38.22%(est.)
South Thanet	61.69%	38.31%(est.)
Newcastle-under-Lyme	61.64%	38.36%(est.)
Folkestone and Hythe	61.64%	38.36%(est.)
Walsall South	61.64%	38.36%
Warley	61.63%	38.37%(est.)
Sleaford and North Hykeham	61.58%	38.42%(est.)
Braintree	61.52%	38.48%(est.)
Leeds East	61.44%	38.56%(est.)
Derby South	61.35%	38.65%(est.)
Scarborough and Whitby	61.32%	38.68%(est.)
Oldham West and Royton	61.31%	38.69%
Brentwood and Ongar	61.19%	38.81%(est.)
Epping Forest	61.01%	38.99%(est.)
Workington	61.01%	38.99%(est.)
Grantham and Stamford	61%	39%(est.)
Redditch	60.99%	39.01%(est.)
Kettering	60.99%	39.01%
Denton and Reddish	60.98%	39.02%
Maldon	60.96%	39.04%(est.)
Rochford and Southend East	60.92%	39.08%(est.)
Bishop Auckland	60.89%	39.11%(est.)
Bosworth	60.83%	39.17%(est.)
Torfaen	60.78%	39.22%(est.)
North West Leicestershire	60.7%	39.3%
Penistone and Stocksbridge	60.65%	39.35%(est.)
Carlisle	60.64%	39.36%(est.)
Mid Norfolk	60.6%	39.4%(est.)
Blyth Valley	60.49%	39.51%(est.)
Witham	60.47%	39.53%(est.)
Rhondda	60.45%	39.55%(est.)
Hereford and South Herefordshire	60.42%	39.58%(est.)
South Derbyshire	60.35%	39.65%
North Durham	60.3%	39.7%(est.)
Spelthorne	60.3%	39.7%
Southampton, Itchen	60.29%	39.71%(est.)
Crewe and Nantwich	60.29%	39.71%(est.)
Northampton North	60.27%	39.73%(est.)
North Cornwall	60.19%	39.81%(est.)
New Forest East	60.18%	39.82%(est.)
Corby	60.15%	39.85%(est.)
Aberavon	60.12%	39.88%(est.)
Birmingham, Yardley	60.1%	39.9%
Barking	59.97%	40.03%(est.)
Sheffield, Brightside and Hillsborough	59.97%	40.03%(est.)
Christchurch	59.96%	40.04%(est.)
Sunderland Central	59.94%	40.06%
Oldham East and Saddleworth	59.92%	40.08%
Clwyd South	59.88%	40.12%(est.)
Yeovil	59.87%	40.13%(est.)
Ashford	59.86%	40.14%(est.)
North Shropshire	59.85%	40.15%(est.)
Morley and Outwood	59.82%	40.18%(est.)
Worsley and Eccles South	59.79%	40.21%
Kingston upon Hull North	59.79%	40.21%(est.)
Batley and Spen	59.63%	40.37%(est.)
North Tyneside	59.52%	40.48%(est.)
South Dorset	59.45%	40.55%(est.)
Sedgefield	59.44%	40.56%(est.)
Mid Worcestershire	59.39%	40.61%(est.)
Newport East	59.33%	40.67%(est.)
The Wrekin	59.32%	40.68%(est.)
Chesterfield	59.29%	40.71%(est.)
Stalybridge and Hyde	59.29%	40.71%
Copeland	59.2%	40.8%(est.)
Luton North	59.15%	40.85%(est.)
Harwich and North Essex	59%	41%(est.)
Northampton South	59%	41%(est.)
Islwyn	58.94%	41.06%(est.)
Rossendale and Darwen	58.94%	41.06%(est.)
Ogmore	58.9%	41.1%(est.)
Halifax	58.82%	41.18%
Gloucester	58.81%	41.19%(est.)
Meriden	58.81%	41.19%
Beverley and Holderness	58.74%	41.26%(est.)
Ribble Valley	58.73%	41.27%(est.)
Faversham and Mid Kent	58.67%	41.33%(est.)
Rugby	58.62%	41.38%(est.)
Daventry	58.59%	41.41%(est.)
Crawley	58.41%	41.59%
Camborne and Redruth	58.41%	41.59%(est.)
North Norfolk	58.4%	41.6%(est.)
St Helens North	58.39%	41.61%(est.)
Coventry North West	58.37%	41.63%(est.)
Merthyr Tydfil and Rhymney	58.35%	41.65%(est.)
Ellesmere Port and Neston	58.34%	41.66%(est.)
Hayes and Harlington	58.25%	41.75%(est.)
Morecambe and Lunesdale	58.19%	41.81%(est.)
South Leicestershire	58.14%	41.86%(est.)
Bolton North East	58.11%	41.89%(est.)
Darlington	58.1%	41.9%(est.)
South West Bedfordshire	58.08%	41.92%(est.)
Warrington North	58.07%	41.93%(est.)
Alyn and Deeside	58.05%	41.95%(est.)
North Herefordshire	58.02%	41.98%(est.)
Aldershot	57.9%	42.1%
Forest of Dean	57.89%	42.11%(est.)
Ludlow	57.88%	42.12%(est.)
Charnwood	57.87%	42.13%(est.)
Tiverton and Honiton	57.82%	42.18%(est.)
Coventry North East	57.77%	42.23%(est.)
Stockton South	57.76%	42.24%(est.)
Bournemouth West	57.73%	42.27%(est.)
Bexhill and Battle	57.72%	42.28%(est.)
Halton	57.67%	42.33%(est.)
Selby and Ainsty	57.65%	42.35%(est.)
Wrexham	57.57%	42.43%(est.)
Eastbourne	57.54%	42.46%(est.)
Orpington	57.54%	42.46%
Stone	57.54%	42.46%(est.)
Lichfield	57.51%	42.49%(est.)
Stafford	57.46%	42.54%(est.)
Rochdale	57.45%	42.55%
Lincoln	57.43%	42.57%(est.)
Poole	57.42%	42.58%(est.)
North Swindon	57.29%	42.71%(est.)
Barrow and Furness	57.28%	42.72%(est.)
Weston-Super-Mare	57.2%	42.8%(est.)
Torridge and West Devon	57.19%	42.81%(est.)
Uxbridge and South Ruislip	57.19%	42.81%(est.)
Sheffield, Heeley	57.16%	42.84%(est.)
Dewsbury	57.15%	42.85%(est.)
Kingswood	57.12%	42.88%(est.)
Mid Dorset and North Poole	57.08%	42.92%(est.)
North Devon	57.04%	42.96%
Stevenage	57.04%	42.96%(est.)
North West Cambridgeshire	56.93%	43.07%(est.)
South West Wiltshire	56.88%	43.12%(est.)
Newcastle upon Tyne North	56.83%	43.17%(est.)
Elmet and Rothwell	56.79%	43.21%(est.)
Chorley	56.75%	43.25%(est.)
Cynon Valley	56.73%	43.27%(est.)
Fylde	56.73%	43.27%(est.)
Norwich North	56.73%	43.27%(est.)
Llanelli	56.67%	43.33%(est.)
South Ribble	56.64%	43.36%(est.)
North Dorset	56.61%	43.39%(est.)
Vale of Clwyd	56.56%	43.44%(est.)
Ipswich	56.52%	43.48%(est.)
Thirsk and Malton	56.43%	43.57%(est.)
Gedling	56.3%	43.7%(est.)
Wansbeck	56.29%	43.71%(est.)
Carshalton and Wallington	56.26%	43.74%(est.)
Gateshead	56.22%	43.78%(est.)
Blaydon	56.12%	43.88%(est.)
St Helens South and Whiston	56.05%	43.95%(est.)
Worthing West	56.02%	43.98%(est.)
Newton Abbot	56.01%	43.99%(est.)
Hastings and Rye	55.94%	44.06%(est.)
Feltham and Heston	55.93%	44.07%
Maidstone and The Weald	55.92%	44.08%(est.)
Montgomeryshire	55.84%	44.16%(est.)
Newark	55.7%	44.3%(est.)
Preston	55.67%	44.33%(est.)
Bolton West	55.55%	44.45%(est.)
Strangford	55.53%	44.47%
Fareham	55.52%	44.48%(est.)
Hemel Hempstead	55.49%	44.51%(est.)
Bromsgrove	55.37%	44.63%
Preseli Pembrokeshire	55.32%	44.68%(est.)
Berwick-upon-Tweed	55.3%	44.7%(est.)
New Forest West	55.26%	44.74%(est.)
Haltemprice and Howden	55.23%	44.77%(est.)
Suffolk Coastal	55.21%	44.79%(est.)
Penrith and The Border	55.2%	44.8%(est.)
East Antrim	55.19%	44.81%
Carmarthen West and South Pembrokeshire	55.16%	44.84%(est.)
Bradford East	55.16%	44.84%
Caerphilly	55.14%	44.86%(est.)
South East Cornwall	55.1%	44.9%(est.)
South West Devon	55.08%	44.92%(est.)
Southend West	55.07%	44.93%
North West Durham	55.05%	44.95%(est.)
West Lancashire	54.95%	45.05%(est.)
Central Suffolk and North Ipswich	54.89%	45.11%(est.)
Bootle	54.8%	45.2%(est.)
St Ives	54.77%	45.23%(est.)
North West Hampshire	54.75%	45.25%(est.)
Richmond (Yorks)	54.71%	45.29%(est.)
Erith and Thamesmead	54.63%	45.37%(est.)
Luton South	54.6%	45.4%(est.)
Bury South	54.51%	45.49%(est.)
Delyn	54.41%	45.59%(est.)
Plymouth, Sutton and Devonport	54.41%	45.59%
Wolverhampton South West	54.37%	45.63%
Eastleigh	54.35%	45.65%(est.)
Derby North	54.25%	45.75%(est.)
East Surrey	54.2%	45.8%(est.)
Wyre and Preston North	54.2%	45.8%(est.)
Broadland	54.1%	45.9%(est.)
Leicester East	54.06%	45.94%(est.)
Slough	54.06%	45.94%(est.)
Sevenoaks	54.04%	45.96%(est.)
South Suffolk	54.03%	45.97%(est.)
Neath	54.02%	45.98%(est.)
Bury St Edmunds	53.99%	46.01%(est.)
Totnes	53.89%	46.11%(est.)
Rutland and Melton	53.88%	46.12%(est.)
Blackburn	53.73%	46.27%
Bournemouth East	53.69%	46.31%(est.)
East Worthing and Shoreham	53.68%	46.32%(est.)
Worcester	53.68%	46.32%
Bury North	53.67%	46.33%(est.)
Newport West	53.66%	46.34%(est.)
Tewkesbury	53.65%	46.35%(est.)
Wells	53.63%	46.37%(est.)
Basingstoke	53.6%	46.4%(est.)
Banff and Buchan	53.59%	46.41%(est.)
Salford and Eccles	53.59%	46.41%
Devizes	53.53%	46.47%(est.)
Huntingdon	53.49%	46.51%(est.)
North East Bedfordshire	53.44%	46.56%(est.)
Solihull	53.35%	46.65%
South Northamptonshire	53.34%	46.66%(est.)
Keighley	53.33%	46.67%
Ilford North	53.31%	46.69%(est.)
Leeds West	53.27%	46.73%(est.)
Bracknell	53.24%	46.76%(est.)
Carmarthen East and Dinefwr	53.21%	46.79%(est.)
Skipton and Ripon	53.19%	46.81%(est.)
Calder Valley	53.16%	46.84%
Lagan Valley	53.09%	46.91%
Milton Keynes South	53.08%	46.92%(est.)
Clwyd West	53.01%	46.99%(est.)
Taunton Deane	52.92%	47.08%
Shrewsbury and Atcham	52.92%	47.08%(est.)
Mid Bedfordshire	52.88%	47.12%(est.)
Tonbridge and Malling	52.86%	47.14%(est.)
Welwyn Hatfield	52.82%	47.18%(est.)
Wealden	52.77%	47.23%(est.)
Upper Bann	52.62%	47.38%
Congleton	52.61%	47.39%(est.)
Vale of Glamorgan	52.55%	47.45%(est.)
West Worcestershire	52.52%	47.48%(est.)
Broxtowe	52.51%	47.49%(est.)
Mid Derbyshire	52.47%	47.53%(est.)
Harborough	52.37%	47.63%(est.)
Knowsley	52.34%	47.66%(est.)
Shipley	52.21%	47.79%
Hazel Grove	52.21%	47.79%
Aberconwy	52.2%	47.8%(est.)
Thornbury and Yate	52.19%	47.81%(est.)
Liverpool, Walton	52.17%	47.83%(est.)
Eddisbury	52.17%	47.83%(est.)
Lancaster and Fleetwood	51.99%	48.01%(est.)
Bedford	51.95%	48.05%
Belfast East	51.94%	48.06%
Meon Valley	51.93%	48.07%(est.)
Brecon and Radnorshire	51.86%	48.14%(est.)
Surrey Heath	51.85%	48.15%(est.)
Huddersfield	51.85%	48.15%(est.)
Eltham	51.82%	48.18%
Aylesbury	51.79%	48.21%(est.)
Portsmouth South	51.76%	48.24%
Birkenhead	51.71%	48.29%
Sutton Coldfield	51.7%	48.3%
South Swindon	51.65%	48.35%(est.)
North East Somerset	51.63%	48.37%(est.)
Chippenham	51.59%	48.41%(est.)
Colchester	51.51%	48.49%(est.)
Reading West	51.51%	48.49%(est.)
Birmingham, Hodge Hill	51.5%	48.5%
North East Hertfordshire	51.43%	48.57%(est.)
Caithness, Sutherland and Easter Ross	51.34%	48.66%(est.)
Sutton and Cheam	51.28%	48.72%(est.)
Saffron Walden	51.24%	48.76%(est.)
Derbyshire Dales	51.24%	48.76%(est.)
Birmingham, Perry Barr	51.2%	48.8%
Watford	51.15%	48.85%(est.)
Warrington South	51.11%	48.89%(est.)
West Dorset	51.04%	48.96%(est.)
Stratford-on-Avon	51%	49%(est.)
Ynys Mon	50.94%	49.06%
Central Devon	50.89%	49.11%(est.)
South Norfolk	50.88%	49.12%(est.)
Hertsmere	50.84%	49.16%
Leicester West	50.84%	49.16%(est.)
Chichester	50.73%	49.27%(est.)
Chelmsford	50.68%	49.32%(est.)
Weaver Vale	50.55%	49.45%(est.)
High Peak	50.55%	49.45%
East Devon	50.41%	49.59%(est.)
Coventry South	50.38%	49.62%(est.)
Banbury	50.35%	49.65%(est.)
Somerton and Frome	50.33%	49.67%(est.)
Croydon Central	50.31%	49.69%
North Wiltshire	50.3%	49.7%(est.)
Bridgend	50.28%	49.72%(est.)
Loughborough	50.09%	49.91%(est.)
Colne Valley	50.06%	49.94%(est.)
Blackley and Broughton	50.04%	49.96%(est.)
Wallasey	49.92%	50.08%
Salisbury	49.91%	50.09%(est.)
Chingford and Woodford Green	49.88%	50.12%(est.)
Moray	49.87%	50.13%
Runnymede and Weybridge	49.85%	50.15%(est.)
Bromley and Chislehurst	49.83%	50.17%
Liverpool, West Derby	49.82%	50.18%(est.)
Arundel and South Downs	49.7%	50.3%(est.)
Milton Keynes North	49.67%	50.33%(est.)
Wythenshawe and Sale East	49.65%	50.35%(est.)
Belfast North	49.64%	50.36%
Ruislip, Northwood and Pinner	49.54%	50.46%(est.)
Horsham	49.49%	50.51%(est.)
Southampton, Test	49.41%	50.59%(est.)
Gower	49.31%	50.69%(est.)
East Hampshire	49.27%	50.73%(est.)
Hertford and Stortford	49.24%	50.76%(est.)
Enfield North	49.22%	50.78%
Beaconsfield	49.01%	50.99%(est.)
Stretford and Urmston	48.91%	51.09%(est.)
Buckingham	48.87%	51.13%(est.)
Filton and Bradley Stoke	48.77%	51.23%(est.)
Pudsey	48.58%	51.42%(est.)
Wycombe	48.46%	51.54%(est.)
Angus	48.24%	51.76%(est.)
Monmouth	48.06%	51.94%(est.)
Newcastle upon Tyne Central	48%	52%(est.)
Reigate	47.98%	52.02%(est.)
East Londonderry	47.97%	52.03%
West Ham	47.97%	52.03%(est.)
Garston and Halewood	47.96%	52.04%(est.)
The Cotswolds	47.92%	52.08%(est.)
Newbury	47.81%	52.19%(est.)
Epsom and Ewell	47.78%	52.22%(est.)
North Down	47.64%	52.36%
Tynemouth	47.64%	52.36%(est.)
Glenrothes	47.61%	52.39%(est.)
North Somerset	47.58%	52.42%(est.)
Harrow East	47.48%	52.52%
Dwyfor Meirionnydd	47.43%	52.57%(est.)
Mole Valley	47.31%	52.69%(est.)
Birmingham, Edgbaston	47.3%	52.7%
Macclesfield	47.18%	52.82%(est.)
Harrogate and Knaresborough	47.18%	52.82%(est.)
Lewes	47.14%	52.86%(est.)
Bristol South	47.14%	52.86%
Westmorland and Lonsdale	47.06%	52.94%(est.)
Birmingham, Selly Oak	46.9%	53.1%
Bristol East	46.8%	53.2%
Stockport	46.79%	53.21%
Bradford West	46.74%	53.26%
Windsor	46.66%	53.34%(est.)
Beckenham	46.58%	53.42%(est.)
Wirral South	46.55%	53.45%
Pontypridd	46.51%	53.49%(est.)
Nottingham South	46.47%	53.53%
Wantage	46.46%	53.54%(est.)
Mid Sussex	46.44%	53.56%(est.)
Witney	46.34%	53.66%
Southport	46.29%	53.71%(est.)
East Ham	46.27%	53.73%(est.)
Ealing North	46.26%	53.74%
Kenilworth and Southam	46.21%	53.79%(est.)
South West Hertfordshire	46.2%	53.8%(est.)
North East Hampshire	46.18%	53.82%(est.)
Romsey and Southampton North	46.08%	53.92%(est.)
Leeds Central	45.96%	54.04%(est.)
Stroud	45.86%	54.14%(est.)
Truro and Falmouth	45.85%	54.15%(est.)
Croydon South	45.81%	54.19%
Tatton	45.63%	54.37%(est.)
Edmonton	45.51%	54.49%
Ceredigion	45.37%	54.63%
Hexham	45.34%	54.66%(est.)
Canterbury	45.33%	54.67%(est.)
South East Cambridgeshire	45.3%	54.7%(est.)
Dumfries and Galloway	45.11%	54.89%(est.)
Harrow West	45.06%	54.94%
Maidenhead	45.03%	54.97%(est.)
Chesham and Amersham	44.98%	55.02%
Exeter	44.83%	55.17%(est.)
Na h-Eileanan an Iar	44.76%	55.24%
Wirral West	44.69%	55.31%
Mitcham and Morden	44.69%	55.31%
York Outer	44.67%	55.33%(est.)
Tunbridge Wells	44.65%	55.35%(est.)
Dumfriesshire, Clydesdale and Tweeddale	44.65%	55.35%(est.)
Gordon	44.29%	55.71%(est.)
Woking	44.25%	55.75%(est.)
Ayr, Carrick and Cumnock	44.11%	55.89%(est.)
Sefton Central	44.09%	55.91%(est.)
Glasgow East	43.84%	56.16%
Cardiff West	43.82%	56.18%(est.)
Brighton, Kemptown	43.59%	56.41%(est.)
Ross, Skye and Lochaber	43.49%	56.51%(est.)
Swansea West	43.4%	56.6%(est.)
City of Durham	43.34%	56.66%(est.)
Ilford South	43.31%	56.69%(est.)
Brentford and Isleworth	43.31%	56.69%
Kirkcaldy and Cowdenbeath	43.26%	56.74%(est.)
Livingston	43.26%	56.74%(est.)
Berwickshire, Roxburgh and Selkirk	43.26%	56.74%(est.)
Aberdeen North	43.09%	56.91%(est.)
Henley	43.09%	56.91%(est.)
Cheltenham	42.9%	57.1%(est.)
Brent Central	42.89%	57.11%(est.)
Nottingham East	42.88%	57.12%
Cardiff South and Penarth	42.82%	57.18%(est.)
Wokingham	42.69%	57.31%(est.)
Cheadle	42.65%	57.35%
Brent North	42.61%	57.39%(est.)
Leicester South	42.44%	57.56%(est.)
North Ayrshire and Arran	42.4%	57.6%(est.)
City of Chester	42.28%	57.72%(est.)
Falkirk	42.11%	57.89%(est.)
Linlithgow and East Falkirk	42.02%	57.98%(est.)
Ealing, Southall	41.83%	58.17%
Warwick and Leamington	41.64%	58.36%(est.)
Central Ayrshire	41.62%	58.38%(est.)
Bristol North West	41.6%	58.4%
Hendon	41.57%	58.43%(est.)
Esher and Walton	41.57%	58.43%(est.)
Rushcliffe	41.47%	58.53%(est.)
Fermanagh and South Tyrone	41.44%	58.56%
Guildford	41.2%	58.8%(est.)
South Antrim	41.18%	58.82%
Croydon North	41.17%	58.83%
Chipping Barnet	41.07%	58.93%(est.)
Newcastle upon Tyne East	41.07%	58.93%(est.)
Glasgow South West	40.86%	59.14%
Kingston and Surbiton	40.84%	59.16%(est.)
South West Surrey	40.75%	59.25%(est.)
Dundee West	40.75%	59.25%(est.)
Glasgow North East	40.66%	59.34%
Norwich South	40.53%	59.47%(est.)
Orkney and Shetland	40.28%	59.72%(est.)
Inverness, Nairn, Badenoch and Strathspey	40.13%	59.87%(est.)
Perth and North Perthshire	39.9%	60.1%(est.)
Airdrie and Shotts	39.84%	60.16%(est.)
Hitchin and Harpenden	39.79%	60.21%
Winchester	39.64%	60.36%(est.)
Mid Ulster	39.61%	60.39%
Ochil and South Perthshire	39.5%	60.5%(est.)
Kilmarnock and Loudoun	39.45%	60.55%(est.)
Argyll and Bute	39.43%	60.57%
Dunfermline and West Fife	39.39%	60.61%(est.)
West Aberdeenshire and Kincardine	39.17%	60.83%(est.)
Cardiff North	39.15%	60.85%(est.)
York Central	38.82%	61.18%(est.)
Coatbridge, Chryston and Bellshill	38.78%	61.22%(est.)
Altrincham and Sale West	38.59%	61.41%(est.)
South Cambridgeshire	38.49%	61.51%(est.)
Dundee East	38.41%	61.59%(est.)
Reading East	38.25%	61.75%(est.)
Manchester, Gorton	38.21%	61.79%(est.)
Oxford West and Abingdon	38.03%	61.97%(est.)
West Dunbartonshire	38.01%	61.99%
Midlothian	37.94%	62.06%
Enfield, Southgate	37.88%	62.12%
St Albans	37.83%	62.17%(est.)
Motherwell and Wishaw	37.71%	62.29%(est.)
Rutherglen and Hamilton West	37.57%	62.43%(est.)
Leeds North East	37.42%	62.58%(est.)
Newry and Armagh	37.06%	62.94%
Cumbernauld, Kilsyth and Kirkintilloch East	36.99%	63.01%(est.)
East Kilbride, Strathaven and Lesmahagow	36.93%	63.07%(est.)
Manchester Central	36.36%	63.64%(est.)
North East Fife	36.31%	63.69%(est.)
Inverclyde	36.2%	63.8%
Lanark and Hamilton East	35.96%	64.04%(est.)
Arfon	35.85%	64.15%(est.)
Greenwich and Woolwich	35.67%	64.33%
Birmingham, Ladywood	35.6%	64.4%
Paisley and Renfrewshire North	35.55%	64.45%(est.)
Leeds North West	35.41%	64.59%(est.)
East Lothian	35.4%	64.6%
Lewisham East	35.37%	64.63%(est.)
Liverpool, Wavertree	35.26%	64.74%(est.)
Paisley and Renfrewshire South	34.8%	65.2%(est.)
Leyton and Wanstead	34.76%	65.24%(est.)
Lewisham West and Penge	34.59%	65.41%(est.)
Poplar and Limehouse	34.21%	65.79%(est.)
Sheffield, Hallam	34.01%	65.99%(est.)
Westminster North	33.65%	66.35%(est.)
Birmingham, Hall Green	33.6%	66.4%
Walthamstow	33.49%	66.51%
Twickenham	33.32%	66.68%(est.)
West Tyrone	33.15%	66.85%
Hove	32.95%	67.05%(est.)
South Down	32.76%	67.24%
Oxford East	32.53%	67.47%(est.)
Stirling	32.28%	67.72%
Aberdeen South	32.14%	67.86%(est.)
Cardiff Central	32.01%	67.99%(est.)
Sheffield Central	31.91%	68.09%(est.)
Bath	31.72%	68.28%(est.)
Glasgow North West	31.49%	68.51%
Camberwell and Peckham	31.48%	68.52%(est.)
Hammersmith	31.31%	68.69%(est.)
Kensington	31.2%	68.8%(est.)
Finchley and Golders Green	31.1%	68.9%(est.)
Bethnal Green and Bow	30.86%	69.14%(est.)
Belfast South	30.51%	69.49%
Wimbledon	29.37%	70.63%
Ealing Central and Acton	29.15%	70.85%
Chelsea and Fulham	29.1%	70.9%(est.)
Edinburgh West	28.77%	71.23%
Glasgow Central	28.75%	71.25%
Richmond Park	28.69%	71.31%(est.)
Islington South and Finsbury	28.28%	71.72%
Glasgow South	28.19%	71.81%
Cities of London and Westminster	28.05%	71.95%(est.)
Edinburgh South West	27.86%	72.14%
Putney	27.76%	72.24%(est.)
Edinburgh East	27.64%	72.36%
Liverpool, Riverside	27.3%	72.7%(est.)
East Dunbartonshire	26.87%	73.13%(est.)
Holborn and St Pancras	26.66%	73.34%
Cambridge	26.23%	73.77%
Bermondsey and Old Southwark	26.05%	73.95%(est.)
Belfast West	25.94%	74.06%
Brighton, Pavilion	25.93%	74.07%(est.)
East Renfrewshire	25.68%	74.32%
Tooting	25.59%	74.41%(est.)
Hornsey and Wood Green	24.98%	75.02%
Manchester, Withington	24.94%	75.06%(est.)
Lewisham, Deptford	24.43%	75.57%(est.)
Tottenham	23.78%	76.22%
Hampstead and Kilburn	23.73%	76.27%(est.)
Dulwich and West Norwood	22.94%	77.06%(est.)
Hackney South and Shoreditch	22.78%	77.22%(est.)
Vauxhall	22.43%	77.57%
Edinburgh South	22.15%	77.85%
Battersea	22.05%	77.95%(est.)
Edinburgh North and Leith	21.8%	78.2%
Foyle	21.74%	78.26%
Glasgow North	21.62%	78.38%
Islington North	21.61%	78.39%
Bristol West	20.71%	79.29%
Streatham	20.54%	79.46%
Hackney North and Stoke Newington	20.48%	79.52%(est.)

== Most heavily tilted areas ==
=== Most heavily Leave areas ===
The following were the ten voting areas that voted most heavily in favour of leave. All but one of them were in the East Midlands and East of England regions, with four of the ten, including the top two, located in Lincolnshire.

Ranking	Voting area	Voter turnout, of eligible	Votes		Proportion of votes		Region
Ranking	Voting area	Voter turnout, of eligible	Remain	Leave	Remain	Leave	Region
1	Boston	77.2%	7,430	22,974	24.4%	75.6%	East Midlands
2	South Holland	75.3%	13,074	36,423	26.4%	73.6%	East Midlands
3	Castle Point	75.3%	14,154	37,691	27.3%	72.7%	East of England
4	Thurrock	72.7%	22,151	57,765	27.7%	72.3%	East of England
5	Great Yarmouth	69.0%	14,284	35,844	28.5%	71.5%	East of England
6	Fenland	73.7%	15,055	37,571	28.6%	71.4%	East of England
7	Mansfield	72.6%	16,417	39,927	29.1%	70.9%	East Midlands
8	Bolsover	72.3%	12,242	29,730	29.2%	70.8%	East Midlands
9	East Lindsey	74.9%	23,515	56,613	29.3%	70.7%	East Midlands
10	North East Lincolnshire	67.9%	23,797	55,185	30.1%	69.9%	Yorkshire and the Humber

=== Most heavily Remain areas ===
The following were the ten voting areas that voted most heavily in favour of remain. Of the ten, seven were in the Greater London region.

Ranking	Voting area	Voter turnout, of eligible	Votes		Proportion of votes		Region
Ranking	Voting area	Voter turnout, of eligible	Remain	Leave	Remain	Leave	Region
1	Gibraltar	83.5%	19,322	823	95.9%	4.1%	British Overseas Territory (South West England)
2	Lambeth	67.3%	111,584	30,340	78.6%	21.4%	Greater London
3	Hackney	65.1%	83,398	22,868	78.5%	21.5%	Greater London
4	Foyle	57.4%	32,064	8,905	78.3%	21.7%	Northern Ireland
5	Haringey	70.5%	79,991	25,855	75.6%	24.4%	Greater London
6	City of London	73.5%	3,312	1,087	75.3%	24.7%	Greater London
7	Islington	70.3%	76,420	25,180	75.2%	24.8%	Greater London
8	Wandsworth	71.9%	118,463	39,421	75.0%	25.0%	Greater London
9	Camden	65.4%	71,295	23,838	74.9%	25.1%	Greater London
10	City of Edinburgh	72.9%	187,796	64,498	74.4%	25.6%	Scotland

== Most evenly divided areas ==
The narrowest margin of victory for any of the 382 voting areas in the United Kingdom was in the Scottish council area of Moray, which voted by just 122 votes or 0.25% margin in favour of Remain.

In England the narrowest margins of victory for Leave were in Watford which voted by just 252 votes or 0.54% margin in favour of Leave, and in Cherwell which voted by just 500 votes or 0.61% margin in favour of Leave. The narrowest margin of victory for Remain was in the London Borough of Bromley, which voted by just 2,364 votes or a 1.30% margin in favour of Remain.

The area with the closest vote to the national result of 51.89% for Leave, was Basingstoke and Deane, where 51.90% of people voted Leave.

=== Narrowest Leave vote ===
Voting Area	Voter turnout, of eligible	Votes		Proportion of votes		Region	Majority
Voting Area	Voter turnout, of eligible	Remain	Leave	Remain	Leave	Region	Majority
Watford	71.6%	23,167	23,419	49.7%	50.3%	East of England	252

=== Narrowest Remain vote ===
Voting Area	Voter turnout, of eligible	Votes		Proportion of votes		Region	Majority
Voting Area	Voter turnout, of eligible	Remain	Leave	Remain	Leave	Region	Majority
Moray	67.4%	24,114	23,992	50.1%	49.9%	Scotland	122

=== Most similar to Nation ===
Voting Area	Voter turnout, of eligible	Votes		Proportion of votes		Region	Majority
Voting Area	Voter turnout, of eligible	Remain	Leave	Remain	Leave	Region	Majority
Basingstoke and Deane	78.0%	48,257	52,071	48.10%	51.90%	South East England	3,814

== Turnout by age group ==
After the referendum, the annual British Social Attitudes survey questioned the public on their participation. Interviewing was mainly carried out between July and October 2016 and respondents were subdivided into three age groups (18–34, 35–64 and >/=65). The survey revealed that turnout was higher in the older age groups, and was 64%, 80% and 89% respectively. The age disparity had also been a feature of previous elections and referendums. However, compared to the previous referendum in 2011, the young voters' turnout in 2016 had increased sharply by 31%, while turnout by the two older age categories had also increased, but only by 26% and 21%.

== Irregularities ==
In July 2018, Vote Leave was found by the Electoral Commission to have broken electoral law, spending over its limit. Connected to this, the Information Commissioner's Office found that data had been unlawfully harvested from UK voters, and issued a notice of intent to fine Facebook £500,000. Also, the House of Commons Culture, Media and Sport Select Committee, released an interim report on "Disinformation and 'fake news'", stating that Russia had engaged in "unconventional warfare" through Twitter and other social media against the United Kingdom, designed to amplify support for a "leave" vote in Brexit. It also found that it could not be satisfied that the largest donor in the Brexit campaign, Arron Banks, used money from UK sources, and found that he might have been financed by the Russian government. This led to litigation to declare the result void. Kyle Taylor of the Fair Vote Project, a campaign group that called for a public inquiry and supported a second referendum, said: "The issue is too big to have half the country or more than half the country, wonder 'was that actually the result? Is this the future the country wants?' That's first and foremost, let's be certain, everybody play by the rules." Taylor maintains further, "on the basis of fairness, it has to be the same vote posed in the same way."

In July 2018 the Electoral Commission, Information Commissioner's Office, and the House of Commons Digital, Culture, Media and Sport Committee issued reports, finding variously criminal offences of overspending by Vote Leave, data offences, and foreign interference by Russia. In August 2018, this led to legal challenges to declare the referendum void for violating common law and United Kingdom constitutional law. In May 2020, the Electoral Commission, which had referred Banks to the National Crime Agency for investigation of these allegations, conceded that he did not break electoral law during the 2016 EU referendum campaign.

== See also ==
1975 results

2016 results

Yes/Remain: 50–60% 60–70% 70-80%
No/Leave: 50–60% 60–70% 70-80%
- Results of the 2016 United Kingdom European Union membership referendum by constituency
- European Union Referendum Act 2015
- European Communities Act 1972 (UK)
- 1975 United Kingdom European Communities membership referendum
- Results of the 1975 United Kingdom European Communities membership referendum
- Referendum Act 1975
- European Union (Amendment) Act 2008
- European Union Act 2011
- 2015–2016 United Kingdom renegotiation of European Union membership
- European Union (Notification of Withdrawal) Act 2017
- European Union (Withdrawal) Act 2018
