= Results of the 1975 United Kingdom European Communities membership referendum =

1975 United Kingdom European Communities membership referendum
- 5 June 1975
- The Government has announced the results of the renegotiation of the United Kingdom's terms of membership of the European Community. Do you think the United Kingdom should stay in the European Community (the Common Market)?

Results
Choice	Votes	%
Yes	17,378,581	67.23%
No	8,470,073	32.77%
Valid votes	25,848,654	99.79%
Invalid or blank votes	54,540	0.21%
Total votes	25,903,194	100.00%
Registered voters/turnout	40,086,677	64.62%
- Results by local voting area Yes: 50–60% 60–70% 70-80% No: 50–60% 60–70% 70-80%

The 1975 United Kingdom European Communities membership referendum was a public vote that took place on 5 June 1975, on whether the United Kingdom should remain a member of the European Communities which was principally the European Economic Community (the Common Market). At the time the UK had already been a member of the EC for two and a half years since joining back on 1 January 1973 and was the first ever national referendum of its kind to be held in the country.

This article lists, by voting area, all the results of the referendum, each ordered into national sections.

Under the provisions of the Referendum Act 1975 there was a total of 68 counting areas across the United Kingdom in which counting took place locally. Once the counting areas had officially declared, their results were then relayed by the returning officers to the Chief counting officer Sir Philip Allen who later declared the final result, In England there was a total of 47 counting areas which were made up of the then county council areas of England along with Greater London and the Isles of Scilly. In Wales there was just 8 counting areas which were also made up by the then county council areas. In Scotland the then 12 administrative regions were used as the counting areas with Northern Ireland acting as a single counting area. This meant that of the counting areas the Isles of Scilly with 1,447 eligible voters had the smallest electorate and was also the smallest geographically and Greater London with 5,250,343 eligible voters had the largest electorate and Highland in northern Scotland was the largest geographically with 127,925 eligible voters.

This made for a highly centralised national count with local authorities (district councils) in England and Wales verifying votes locally after polls closed but counting of all totals were only permitted to be held and declared at county council or Scottish regional council level apart from the Isles of Scilly and was not overseen by any independent public body.

Verification of the votes took place after the polling stations closed but counting of the votes did not start until the following morning on Friday 6 June from 09:00 BST, the day after the poll took place and presented unique challenges as large venues were required as there had been no previous experience of counting on such a large and centralised scale and took almost fourteen hours to complete.

== United Kingdom ==
The national result for the United Kingdom was declared just before 2300 BST on Friday 6 June 1975 by the Chief Counting Officer Sir Philip Allen at Earls Court Exhibition Centre in London. With a national turnout of 64% the target to secure the majority win for the winning side was 12,951,598 votes. The decision by the electorate was a decisive 'Yes' to continued EC membership which won by a huge majority of 8,908,508 votes (34.5%) over those who had voted 'No' to reject continued membership. The result saw decisive 'Yes' votes from all four old Kingdoms, Principality and Province of the United Kingdom and also saw 'Yes' majority votes from all but two counting areas to continued membership of the European Communities (Common Market) which would later become the European Union.

1975 United Kingdom European Communities membership referendum
Choice	Votes	%
Yes	17,378,581	67.23
No	8,470,073	32.77
Valid votes	25,848,654	99.78
Invalid or blank votes	54,540	0.22
Total votes	25,903,194	100.00
Registered voters/turnout	40,086,677	64.62
Source: House of Commons Library

NOTE: Unusually for a referendum Yes was the no change (status quo) option.

National referendum results (excluding invalid votes)
Yes; 17,378,581 (67.2%)	No; 8,470,073 (32.8%)
▲50%

=== Results by United Kingdom constituent countries ===
Country	Electorate	Voter turnout, of eligible	Votes		Proportion of votes		Invalid votes	Highest Yes vote	Highest No vote
Country	Electorate	Voter turnout, of eligible	Yes	No	Yes	No	Invalid votes	Highest Yes vote	Highest No vote
England	33,356,208	64.6%	14,918,009	6,182,052	68.65%	31.35%	42,161	North Yorkshire 76.3%	Tyne and Wear 37.1%
Northern Ireland	1,030,534	47.4%	259,251	237,911	52.19%	47.81%	1,589	One voting area	One voting area
Scotland	3,688,799	61.7%	1,332,186	948,039	58.42%	41.58%	6,481	Borders 72.3%	Western Isles 70.5%
Wales	2,011,136	66.7%	869,135	472,071	64.80%	35.20%	4,339	Powys 74.3%	Mid Glamorgan 43.1%

== England ==
Results by nation.

United Kingdom European Communities membership referendum, 1975; England
Choice	Votes	%
Yes	14,918,009	68.65%
No	6,812,052	31.35%
Valid votes	21,730,061	99.81%
Invalid or blank votes	42,161	0.19%
Total votes	21,772,222	100.00%
Registered voters and turnout	33,356,208	64.60%

England referendum results (without spoiled ballots)
Yes: 14,918,009 (68.6%)	No: 6,812,052 (31.4%)
▲

England was broken down into 47 counting areas.

County	Votes		Proportion of votes		Turnout
County	Yes	No	Yes	No	Turnout
Avon	310,145	147,024	67.8%	32.2%	68.7%
Bedfordshire	154,338	67,969	69.4%	30.6%	67.9%
Berkshire	215,184	81,221	72.6%	27.4%	66.4%
Buckinghamshire	180,512	62,578	74.3%	25.7%	69.5%
Cambridgeshire	177,789	62,143	74.1%	25.9%	62.9%
Cheshire	290,714	123,839	70.1%	29.9%	65.5%
Cleveland	158,982	77,079	67.3%	32.7%	60.2%
Cornwall	137,828	63,478	68.5%	31.5%	66.8%
Cumbria	162,545	63,564	71.9%	28.1%	64.8%
Derbyshire	286,614	131,452	68.6%	31.4%	64.1%
Devon	334,244	129,179	72.1%	27.9%	68.0%
Dorset	217,432	78,239	73.5%	26.4%	68.3%
Durham	175,284	97,724	64.2%	35.8%	61.5%
Essex	463,505	222,085	67.6%	32.4%	67.7%
Gloucestershire	170,931	67,465	71.7%	28.3%	68.4%
Greater London	2,201,031	1,100,185	66.7%	33.3%	60.8%
Greater Manchester	797,316	439,191	64.5%	35.5%	64.1%
Hampshire	484,302	197,761	71.0%	29.0%	68.0%
Hereford and Worcester	203,128	75,779	72.8%	27.2%	66.4%
Hertfordshire	326,943	137,226	70.4%	29.6%	70.2%
Humberside	257,826	122,199	67.8%	32.2%	62.4%
Isle of Wight	40,837	17,375	70.2%	29.8%	67.5%
Isles of Scilly	802	275	74.5%	25.5%	75.0%
Kent	493,407	207,358	70.4%	29.6%	67.4%
Lancashire	455,170	208,821	68.6%	31.4%	66.4%
Leicestershire	291,500	106,004	73.3%	26.7%	67.2%
Lincolnshire	180,603	61,011	74.7%	25.3%	63.7%
Merseyside	465,625	252,712	64.8%	35.2%	62.7%
Norfolk	218,883	93,198	70.1%	29.9%	63.8%
Northamptonshire	162,803	71,322	69.5%	30.5%	66.7%
Northumberland	95,980	42,645	69.2%	30.8%	65.0%
Nottinghamshire	297,191	147,461	66.8%	33.2%	63.1%
Oxfordshire	179,938	64,643	73.6%	26.4%	67.7%
Shropshire	113,044	43,329	72.3%	27.7%	62.0%
Somerset	138,830	60,631	69.6%	30.4%	67.7%
Staffordshire	306,518	148,252	67.4%	32.6%	64.3%
Suffolk	187,484	72,251	72.2%	27.8%	64.9%
Surrey	386,369	120,576	76.2%	23.8%	70.1%
East Sussex	249,780	86,198	74.3%	25.7%	65.8%
West Sussex	242,890	75,928	76.2%	23.8%	68.6%
Tyne and Wear	344,069	202,511	62.9%	37.1%	62.7%
Warwickshire	156,303	67,221	69.9%	30.1%	68.0%
West Midlands	801,913	429,207	65.1%	34.9%	62.5%
Wiltshire	172,791	68,113	71.7%	28.3%	67.8%
North Yorkshire	234,040	72,805	76.3%	23.7%	64.3%
South Yorkshire	377,916	217,792	63.4%	36.6%	62.4%
West Yorkshire	616,730	326,993	65.4%	34.6%	63.6%
source: The Guardian

== Northern Ireland ==
Northern Ireland was a single counting area.

United Kingdom European Communities membership referendum, 1975; Northern Ireland
Choice	Votes	%
Yes	259,251	52.19%
No	237,911	47.81%
Valid votes	497,162	99.68%
Invalid or blank votes	1,589	0.32%
Total votes	498,751	100.00%
Registered voters and turnout	1,030,534	47.40%

Northern Ireland referendum results (without spoiled ballots)
Yes: 259,251 (52.2%)	No: 237,911 (47.8%)
▲

== Scotland ==
United Kingdom European Communities membership referendum, 1975; Scotland
Choice	Votes	%
Yes	1,332,208	58.42%
No	948,039	41.58%
Valid votes	2,280,225	99.72%
Invalid or blank votes	6,451	0.28%
Total votes	2,286,676	100.00%
Registered voters and turnout	3,688,799	61.70%

Scotland referendum results (without spoiled ballots)
Yes: 1,332,186 (58.4%)	No: 948,039 (42.6%)
▲

Scotland was broken down into 12 counting areas.

Region	Votes		Proportion of votes		Turnout
Region	Yes	No	Yes	No	Turnout
Borders	34,092	13,053	72.3%	27.7%	63.2%
Central	71,986	48,568	59.7%	40.3%	64.1%
Dumfries and Galloway	42,608	19,856	68.2%	31.8%	61.5%
Fife	84,239	65,260	56.3%	43.7%	63.3%
Grampian	108,520	78,071	58.2%	41.8%	57.4%
Highland	40,802	33,979	54.6%	45.4%	58.7%
Lothian	208,133	141,456	59.5%	40.5%	63.6%
Orkney	3,911	2,419	61.8%	38.2%	48.2%
Shetland	2,815	3,631	43.7%	56.3%	47.1%
Strathclyde	625,959	459,073	57.7%	42.3%	61.7%
Tayside	105,728	74,567	58.6%	41.4%	63.8%
Western Isles	3,393	8,106	29.5%	70.5%	50.1%
source: The Guardian

== Wales ==
United Kingdom European Communities membership referendum, 1975; Wales
Choice	Votes	%
Yes; Ydw	869,135	64.80%
No; Nac Ydw	472,071	35.20%
Valid votes	1,345,545	99.68%
Invalid or blank votes	4,339	0.32%
Total votes	815,628	100.00%
Registered voters and turnout	2,011,136	66.90%

Wales referendum results (without spoiled ballots)
Yes: 869,135 (64.8%)	No: 472,071 (35.2%)
▲

Wales was broken down into 8 counting areas.

County	Votes		Proportion of votes		Turnout
County	Yes	No	Yes	No	Turnout
Clwyd	123,980	55,424	69.1%	30.9%	65.8%
Dyfed	109,184	52,264	67.6%	32.4%	67.5%
Mid Glamorgan	147,348	111,672	56.9%	43.1%	66.6%
South Glamorgan	127,932	56,224	69.5%	30.5%	66.7%
West Glamorgan	112,989	70,316	61.6%	38.4%	67.4%
Gwent	132,557	80,992	62.1%	37.9%	68.2%
Gwynedd	76,421	31,807	70.6%	29.4%	64.3%
Powys	38,724	13,372	74.3%	25.7%	67.9%
source: The Guardian

== See also ==
- Referendum Act 1975
- 2016 United Kingdom European Union membership referendum
- Results of the 2016 United Kingdom European Union membership referendum
- European Communities Act 1972 (UK)
