= Corby Borough Council elections =

Local government elections in Northamptonshire, England

Corby Borough Council was elected every four years. The council was abolished in 2021, with the area becoming part of North Northamptonshire.

== Political control ==
The first election was held in 1973. The council then acted as a shadow authority alongside the outgoing authorities until 1 April 1974 when it formally came into being. From 1974 until its abolition in 2021, political control of the council was as follows:

| Party in control | Years |
|---|---|
| Labour | 1974–1976 |
| Conservative | 1976–1979 |
| Labour | 1979–2021 |

=== Leadership ===
The leaders of the council from 2005 until the council's abolition in 2021 were:

| Councillor | Party | From | To |
|---|---|---|---|
| Pat Fawcett | Labour | 2005 | Dec 2011 |
| Tom Beattie | Labour | 8 Dec 2011 | 31 Mar 2021 |

== Council elections ==
- 1973 Corby District Council election
- 1976 Corby District Council election (New ward boundaries)
- 1979 Corby District Council election
- 1983 Corby District Council election
- 1987 Corby District Council election
- 1991 Corby District Council election
- 1995 Corby Borough Council election
- 1999 Corby Borough Council election (New ward boundaries)
- 2003 Corby Borough Council election
- 2007 Corby Borough Council election (New ward boundaries)
- 2011 Corby Borough Council election
- 2015 Corby Borough Council election (New ward boundaries)

The scheduled 2019 elections were cancelled due to the creation of the new North Northamptonshire unitary authority in 2021.

== Election results ==
| | Overall control | Labour | Conservative | Lib Dem | Independent |
| 2015 | Labour | 24 | 5 | - | - |
| 2011 | Labour | 22 | 4 | 3 | - |
| 2007 | Labour | 16 | 8 | 5 | - |
| 2003 | Labour | 18 | 9 | 2 | - |
| 1999 | Labour | 27 | 1 | 1 | - |
| 1995 | Labour | 24 | 1 | 2 | - |
| 1991 | Labour | 23 | 1 | 2 | 1 |
| 1987 | Labour | 23 | 2 | - | 2 |
| 1983 | Labour | 24 | 3 | - | - |
| 1979 | Labour | 23 | 3 | - | 1 |
| 1976 | Conservative | 10 | 16 | - | 1 (Note: Includes 1 "Independent Socialist".) |
| 1973 | Labour | 29 | 1 | - | 3 |

== Borough result maps ==
1976 results map

1979 results map

1983 results map

1987 results map

1991 results map

1995 results map

1999 results map

2003 results map

2007 results map

2011 results map

2015 results map

== By-election results ==
=== 1995-1999 ===
Rural East By-Election 17 October 1996
| Party | Candidate | Votes | % | ±% |
|---|---|---|---|---|
| Conservative | | 512 | 50.4 | |
| Labour | | 369 | 36.4 | −3.0 |
| Liberal Democrats | | 134 | 13.2 | |
| Majority | | 143 | 14.0 | |
| Turnout | | 1,015 | 51.5 | |
| Conservative hold | | Swing | | |

=== 1999-2003 ===
Danesholme By-Election 7 June 2001
| Party | Candidate | Votes | % | ±% |
|---|---|---|---|---|
| Labour | | 1,345 | 46.0 | −3.0 |
| Conservative | | 735 | 25.1 | +1.1 |
| Liberal Democrats | | 502 | 17.2 | −9.7 |
| Independent | | 342 | 11.7 | +11.7 |
| Majority | | 610 | 20.9 | |
| Turnout | | 2,924 | 65.5 | |
| Labour hold | | Swing | | |

Central By-Election 30 August 2001
| Party | Candidate | Votes | % | ±% |
|---|---|---|---|---|
| Labour | | 542 | 72.9 | −4.0 |
| Conservative | | 201 | 27.1 | +4.0 |
| Majority | | 341 | 45.8 | |
| Turnout | | 743 | | |
| Labour hold | | Swing | | |

Lodge Park By-Election 16 May 2002
| Party | Candidate | Votes | % | ±% |
|---|---|---|---|---|
| Conservative | | 471 | 38.7 | +9.1 |
| Labour | | 380 | 31.2 | −39.2 |
| Independent | | 272 | 22.4 | +22.4 |
| Socialist Labour | | 94 | 7.7 | +7.7 |
| Majority | | 91 | 7.5 | |
| Turnout | | 1,217 | 29.1 | |
| Conservative gain from Labour | | Swing | | |

=== 2007-2011 ===
Oakley Vale By-Election 21 February 2008
| Party | Candidate | Votes | % | ±% |
|---|---|---|---|---|
| Conservative | Becky Miller-Barton | 405 | 49.9 | +6.6 |
| Labour | Madeline Whiteman | 267 | 32.9 | −0.5 |
| Liberal Democrats | Scott Ponton | 140 | 17.2 | +3.0 |
| Majority | | 138 | 17.0 | |
| Turnout | | 812 | 18.7 | |
| Conservative hold | | Swing | | |

=== 2011-2015 ===
East By-Election 12 July 2012
| Party | Candidate | Votes | % | ±% |
|---|---|---|---|---|
| Labour | Seán Kettle | 1,063 | 71.2 | +5.7 |
| Conservative | Kevin Watt | 252 | 16.9 | −7.5 |
| BNP | Gordon Riddell | 141 | 9.4 | −0.7 |
| Liberal Democrats | Julie Grant | 37 | 2.5 | +2.5 |
| Majority | | 811 | 54.3 | |
| Turnout | | 1,493 | | |
| Labour hold | | Swing | | |

Kingswood By-Election 7 November 2013
| Party | Candidate | Votes | % | ±% |
|---|---|---|---|---|
| Labour | Elise Elliston | 722 | 63.3 | −8.5 |
| UKIP | Peter McGowan | 246 | 21.6 | +21.6 |
| Conservative | Phil Ewers | 154 | 13.5 | −14.7 |
| Liberal Democrats | Julie Grant | 18 | 1.6 | +1.6 |
| Majority | | 476 | 41.8 | |
| Turnout | | 1,140 | | |
| Labour hold | | Swing | | |

=== 2015-2021 ===
Kingswood and Hazel Leys By-Election 19 February 2017
| Party | Candidate | Votes | % | ±% |
|---|---|---|---|---|
| Labour | Isabel McNab | 610 | 64.6 | +10.3 |
| Conservative | Stan Heggs | 252 | 26.7 | +12.5 |
| Green | Michael Mahon | 82 | 8.7 | −1.1 |
| Majority | | 358 | 37.9 | |
| Turnout | | 944 | | |
| Labour hold | | Swing | | |

Beanfield By-Election 10 October 2019
| Party | Candidate | Votes | % | ±% |
|---|---|---|---|---|
| Labour | Alison Dalziel | 818 | 56.0 | −5.1 |
| Conservative | Ray Boyd | 497 | 34.0 | +17.4 |
| Liberal Democrats | Chris Stanbra | 147 | 10.0 | +10.0 |
| Majority | | 321 | 22.0 | |
| Turnout | | 1,462 | | |
| Labour hold | | Swing | | |

Weldon and Gretton By-Election 12 December 2019
| Party | Candidate | Votes | % | ±% |
|---|---|---|---|---|
| Conservative | Alexandra Wellings | 1,574 | 44.4 | +5.8 |
| Labour | Ann Wallington | 1,223 | 34.5 | +11.4 |
| Independent | Lee Forster | 381 | 10.7 | +10.7 |
| Liberal Democrats | Terri Meechan | 369 | 10.4 | =5.7 |
| Majority | | 351 | 9.9 | |
| Turnout | | 3,547 | | |
| Conservative hold | | Swing | | |
