= 2011 Corby Borough Council election =

2011 UK local government election

| ← 2007 | 5 May 2011 | 2015 → |

All 29 seats in the Corby Borough Council 15 seats needed for a majority

| | First party | Second party | Third party |
|---|---|---|---|
| Party | Labour | Conservative | Liberal Democrats |
| Last election | 16 seats, 44.1% | 8 seats, 39.3% | 5 seats, 15.1% |
| Seats won | 22 | 4 | 3 |
| Seat change | ▲6 | ▼4 | ▼2 |
| Popular vote | 10,305 | 5,082 | 2,435 |
| Percentage | 56.0% | 27.6% | 13.2% |
| Swing | ▲11.9% | ▼11.7% | ▼1.9% |
- Map showing the results of the 2011 Corby Borough Council elections.
Council control before election
Labour
Council control after election
Labour

The 2011 Corby Borough Council election took place on 5 May 2011 to elect members of Corby Borough Council in England. This was on the same day as other UK local elections. The Labour Party retained control of the council, which it had held continuously since 1979.

== Ward-by-Ward Results ==
=== Beanfield Ward (2 seats) ===
Location of Beanfield ward

Corby Borough Council Elections 2011: Beanfield Ward
| Party | Candidate | Votes | % |
|---|---|---|---|
| Labour | Ann Brown | 911 | 41.9 |
| Labour | Mary Butcher | 634 | 38.4 |
| Conservative | Mathew Howitt | 324 | 19.6 |
| Turnout | | 2, 006 | 42.28 |
| Labour hold | | | |
| Labour hold | | | |

=== Central Ward (1 seat) ===
Location of Central ward

Corby Borough Council Elections 2011: Central Ward
| Party | Candidate | Votes | % |
|---|---|---|---|
| Labour | James Noble | 447 | |
| Conservative | John Gouldson | 175 | |
| Turnout | | 1,585 | 39.43 |
| Labour hold | | | |

=== Danesholme Ward (2 seats) ===
Location of Danesholme ward

Corby Borough Council Elections 2011: Danesholme Ward
| Party | Candidate | Votes | % |
|---|---|---|---|
| Liberal Democrats | Chris Stanbra | 566 | |
| Labour | Peter Petch | 545 | |
| Labour | William Taylor | 484 | |
| Liberal Democrats | Barry O'Brien | 388 | |
| Conservative | Jim McTaggart | 301 | |
| Turnout | | 1,718 | 45.42 |
| Liberal Democrats hold | | | |
| Labour gain from Liberal Democrats | | | |

=== East Ward (3 seats) ===
Location of East ward

Corby Borough Council Elections 2011: East Ward
| Party | Candidate | Votes | % |
|---|---|---|---|
| Labour | Mark Pengelly | 1,336 | |
| Labour | Patricia Fawcett | 1,306 | |
| Labour | Lucy Goult | 1,107 | |
| Conservative | Kevin Watt | 498 | |
| BNP | Gordon Riddell | 205 | |
| Turnout | | 4,452 | 41.18 |
| Labour hold | | | |

=== Exeter Ward (1 seat) ===
Location of Exeter ward

Corby Borough Council Elections 2011: Exeter Ward
| Party | Candidate | Votes | % |
|---|---|---|---|
| Labour | Lawrence Ferguson | 407 | |
| Conservative | Sam Griffiths | 118 | |
| Turnout | | 525 | 34.49 |
| Labour hold | | | |

=== Great Oakley (1 seat) ===
Location of Great Oakley ward

Corby Borough Council Elections 2011: Great Oakley
| Party | Candidate | Votes | % |
|---|---|---|---|
| Labour | Eyusuf Chaudhury | 500 | |
| Conservative | Ray Jackson | 360 | |
| Conservative | Alison Rushton | 54 | |
| Turnout | | 914 | 48.80 |
| Labour gain from Conservative | | | |

=== Kingswood Ward (3 seats) ===
Location of Kingswood ward

Corby Borough Council Elections 2011: Kingswood Ward
| Party | Candidate | Votes | % |
|---|---|---|---|
| Labour | John McGhee | 1,052 | |
| Labour | Pail Beattie | 1,027 | |
| Labour | Maureen Forshaw | 1,015 | |
| Conservative | David McInnes | 413 | |
| Conservative | Yvonne Von Bujtar | 332 | |
| Turnout | | 3,839 | 34.81 |
| Labour hold | | | |
| Labour hold | | | |
| Labour hold | | | |

=== Lodge Park (2 seats) ===
Location of Lodge Park ward

Corby Borough Council Elections 2011: Lodge Park Ward
| Party | Candidate | Votes | % |
|---|---|---|---|
| Labour | Gail McDade | 685 | |
| Labour | Bob Eyles | 663 | |
| Conservative | Christopher Woolmer | 408 | |
| Turnout | | 1,756 | 45.64 |
| Labour hold | | | |
| Labour gain from Conservative | | | |

=== Oakley Vale Ward (3 seats) ===
Location of Oakley Vale ward

Corby Borough Council Elections 2011: Oakley Vale Ward
| Party | Candidate | Votes | % |
|---|---|---|---|
| Labour | Judy Cain | 1,005 | |
| Labour | Mohammad Rahman | 810 | |
| Conservative | David Sims | 644 | |
| Conservative | Glenn Smith | 606 | |
| Conservative | Eve Howitt | 572 | |
| Liberal Democrats | Michael Rushton | 248 | |
| Turnout | | 3,885 | 30.67 |
| Labour gain from Conservative | | | |
| Labour gain from Conservative | | | |
| Conservative hold | | | |

=== Rowlett Ward (2 seats) ===
Location of Rowlett ward

Corby Borough Council Elections 2011: Rowlett Ward
| Party | Candidate | Votes | % |
|---|---|---|---|
| Labour | Jean Addison | 978 | |
| Labour | Willie Latta | 858 | |
| Conservative | Harry Simpson | 289 | |
| BNP | Annette Carroll | 170 | |
| Turnout | | 2,295 | 40.50 |
| Labour hold | | | |
| Labour hold | | | |

=== Rural West Ward (1 seat) ===
Location of Rural West ward

Corby Borough Council Elections 2011: Rural West Ward
| Party | Candidate | Votes | % |
|---|---|---|---|
| Liberal Democrats | Bob Riley | 470 | |
| Conservative | Marcus Simpson | 300 | |
| Turnout | | 1,440 | 55.28 |
| Liberal Democrats gain from Conservative | | | |

=== Shire Lodge (2 seats) ===
Location of Shire Lodge ward

Corby Borough Council Elections 2011: Shire Lodge Ward
| Party | Candidate | Votes | % |
|---|---|---|---|
| Labour | Tom Beattie | 905 | |
| Labour | Raymond Beeby | 753 | |
| Conservative | Mark Taitt | 278 | |
| Turnout | | 1,936 | 35.07 |
| Labour hold | | | |
| Labour hold | | | |

=== Stanion and Corby Village Ward (2 seats) ===
Location of Stanion and Corby Village ward

Corby Borough Council Elections 2011: Stanion and Corby Village Ward
| Party | Candidate | Votes | % |
|---|---|---|---|
| Conservative | Stan Heggs | 467 | |
| Conservative | Ray Lilley | 440 | |
| Labour | Margey Whalley | 418 | |
| Liberal Democrats | Julie Grant | 128 | |
| Turnout | | 1,453 | 48.06 |
| Conservative hold | | | |
| Conservative hold | | | |

=== Tower Hill Ward (2 seats) ===
Location of Tower Hill ward

Corby Borough Council Elections 2011: Tower Hill Ward
| Party | Candidate | Votes | % |
|---|---|---|---|
| Labour | Anthony Dady | 758 | 21.7 |
| Labour | Peter McEwan | 675 | 23.5 |
| Liberal Democrats | Eddie McGeown | 454 | 24.0 |
| Conservative | Lucy Grant | 271 | 15.8 |
| Conservative | Laura Howitt | 215 | 15.1 |
| Turnout | | 2,373 | 43.55 |
| Labour gain from Liberal Democrats | | | |
| Labour hold | | | |

=== Weldon and Gretton Ward (2 seats) ===
Location of Weldon and Gretton ward

Corby Borough Council Elections 2011: Weldon and Gretton Ward
| Party | Candidate | Votes | % |
|---|---|---|---|
| Liberal Democrats | Phil Bromhall | 515 | |
| Conservative | Rob McKellar | 417 | |
| Liberal Democrats | Terri Meechan | 358 | |
| Labour | Martyn Reuby | 358 | |
| Conservative | Laura-Jane Rawligs | 332 | |
| UKIP | Fred Parker | 189 | |
| Turnout | | 2,169 | 50.35 |
| Conservative gain from Liberal Democrats | | | |
| Liberal Democrats hold | | | |
