= 1999 Corby Borough Council election =

1999 UK local government election

← 1995	6 May 1999	2003 →

All 29 seats in the Corby Borough Council 15 seats needed for a majority

	First party	Second party	Third party
Party	Labour	Conservative	Liberal Democrats
Last election	24 seats, 67.4%	1 seat, 15.5%	2 seats, 5.1%
Seats won	27	1	1
Seat change	▲3	0	▼1
Popular vote	6,021	2,061	758
Percentage	62.4%	21.4%	7.9%
Swing	▼5.0%	▲5.9%	▲2.8%
- Map showing the results of the 1999 Corby Borough Council elections.
Council control before election
Labour
Council control after election
Labour

The 1999 Corby Borough Council election took place on 6 May 1999 to elect members of Corby Borough Council in Northamptonshire, England. It was the first election be held under new ward boundaries. The Labour Party retained overall control of the council, which it had held continuously since 1979.

== Ward-by-ward results ==
=== Central Ward (3 seats) ===
Location of Central ward in Corby

Corby Borough Council Elections 1999: Central Ward
Party	Candidate	Votes	%
Labour	J. Noble	803	
Labour	R. Hearne	801	
Labour	D. Martin	781	
Conservative	K. Marris	241	
Conservative	V. Santoriello	217	
Turnout			28.5%
Labour win (new seat)			
Labour win (new seat)			
Labour win (new seat)			

=== Danesholme Ward (3 seats) ===
Location of Danesholme ward

Corby Borough Council Elections 1999: Danesholme Ward
Party	Candidate	Votes	%
Labour	A. Hill	794	
Labour	M. Brown	791	
Labour	K. Hudson	774	
Liberal Democrats	C. Stanbra	436	
Conservative	R. Boyd	389	
Turnout			29.0%
Labour win (new seat)			
Labour win (new seat)			
Labour win (new seat)			

=== East Ward (2 seats) ===
Location of East ward

Corby Borough Council Elections 1999: East Ward
Party	Candidate	Votes	%
Labour	B. Wade		
Labour	M. Pengelly		
Labour win (new seat)			
Labour win (new seat)			

=== Hazlewood Ward (3 seats) ===
Location of Hazlewood ward

Corby Borough Council Elections 1999: Hazlewood Ward
Party	Candidate	Votes	%
Labour	J. Murray	938	
Labour	A. Macleod	903	
Labour	R. Dalziel	893	
Independent Labour	P. McGowen	398	
Turnout			29.7%
Labour win (new seat)			
Labour win (new seat)			
Labour win (new seat)			

=== Hillside Ward (1 seat) ===
Location of Hillside ward

Corby Borough Council Elections 1999: Hillside Ward
Party	Candidate	Votes	%
Labour	P. Fawcett	213	
Conservative	R. Heap	65	
Turnout			22.3%
Labour win (new seat)			

=== Kingswood Ward (3 seats) ===
Location of Kingswood ward

Corby Borough Council Elections 1999: Kingswood Ward
Party	Candidate	Votes	%
Labour	W. Smith		
Labour	M. Forshaw		
Labour	E. Gordan		
Labour win (new seat)			
Labour win (new seat)			
Labour win (new seat)			

=== Lloyds Ward (3 seats) ===
Location of Lloyds ward

Corby Borough Council Elections 1999: Lloyds Ward
Party	Candidate	Votes	%
Labour	J. Kane	1,091	
Labour	G. McCart	878	
Labour	S. Hagen	825	
Conservative	G. Ellenton	382	
Turnout			30.0%
Labour win (new seat)			
Labour win (new seat)			
Labour win (new seat)			

=== Lodge Park (3 seats) ===
Location of Lodge Park ward

Corby Borough Council Elections 1999: Lodge Park Ward
Party	Candidate	Votes	%
Labour	G. Beale	936	
Labour	J. Field	849	
Labour	M. Hill		835
Conservative	C. Woolmer	394	
Turnout			30.2%
Labour win (new seat)			
Labour win (new seat)			
Labour win (new seat)			

=== Rural East Ward (2 seats) ===
Location of Rural East ward

Corby Borough Council Elections 1999: Rural East Ward
Party	Candidate	Votes	%
Conservative	S. Heggs	396	
Labour	G. Bold	335	
Conservative	B. Pitcher	314	
Turnout			36.0%
Conservative win (new seat)			
Labour win (new seat)			

=== Rural North Ward (1 seat) ===
Location of Rural North ward

Corby Borough Council Elections 1999: Rural North Ward
Party	Candidate	Votes	%
Labour	A. Bianchi	347	
Conservative	R. Tustin	194	
Turnout			50.0%
Labour win (new seat)			

=== Rural West Ward (1 seat) ===
Location of Rural West ward

Corby Borough Council Elections 1999: Rural West Ward
Party	Candidate	Votes	%
Liberal Democrats	R. Rutt	322	
Conservative	P. Buckby	219	
Labour	K. Elms	69	
Turnout			48.5%
Liberal Democrats win (new seat)			

=== Shire Lodge (2 seats) ===
Location of Shire Lodge ward

Corby Borough Council Elections 1999: Shire Lodge Ward
Party	Candidate	Votes	%
Labour	R. Beeby		
Labour	G. Crawley		
Labour win (new seat)			
Labour win (new seat)			

=== West Ward (2 seats) ===
Location of West ward

Corby Borough Council Elections 1999: West Ward
Party	Candidate	Votes	%
Labour	W. Latta	495	
Labour	D. Taylor	464	
Independent Labour	R. Telfer	196	
Turnout			25.0%
Labour win (new seat)			
Labour win (new seat)			
