= 2007 Corby Borough Council election =

2007 UK local government election

← 2003	3 May 2007	2011 →

All 29 seats in the Corby Borough Council 15 seats needed for a majority
	First party	Second party	Third party
Party	Labour	Conservative	Liberal Democrats
Last election	18 seats, 40.3%	9 seats, 36.2%	2 seats, 18.0%
Seats won	16	8	5
Seat change	▼2	▼1	▲3
Popular vote	6,605	5,877	2,260
Percentage	44.1%	39.3%	15.1%
Swing	▲3.8%	▲3.1%	▼2.9%
- Map showing the results of the 2007 Corby Borough Council elections
Council control before election
Labour
Council control after election
Labour

Elections for Corby Borough Council, which covers the Borough of Corby, were held on 3 May 2007 in Northamptonshire, England. Labour retained overall control of the council. There had been a number of boundary changes since the 2003 elections. The overall results, using average ward votes for the total number of votes cast, were as follows:

Corby Borough Council elections 2007: summary results
Party	Candidates	Votes	% votes	Seats	Change
Labour	27	6,419	44.5	16	-2
Conservative	25	5,721	39.7	8	-1
Liberal Democrats	8	2,156	14.9	5	+3
Green	1	129	0.9	0	0
Independent	1	90	0.6	0	0
Total	62	14,425		29	
Electorate					
Turnout					

(Vote counts shown are ward averages.)

== Ward-by-ward results ==
=== Beanfield Ward (2 seats) ===
Location of Beanfield Ward

Corby Borough Council elections 2007: Beanfield Ward
Party	Candidate	Votes	%
Labour	Ann Brown	695	41.9
Labour	Mary Butcher	634	38.4
Conservative	Clive Reed	324	19.6

Ward summary
Party	Votes	% votes	Seats	Change
Labour	665	67.2	2	
Conservative	325	32.8	0	
Total votes cast	988			
Electorate	2828			
Turnout	34.9			

(Vote count shown is ward average.)

=== Central Ward (1 seat) ===
Location of Central Ward

Corby Borough Council elections 2007: Central Ward
Party	Candidate	Votes	%
Labour	James Noble	312	54.5
Conservative	Michael Rodden	261	44.5

Ward summary
Party	Votes	% votes	Seats	Change
Labour	312	54.5	1	
Conservative	261	45.5	0	
Total votes cast	573			
Electorate	1547			
Turnout	37.0			

(Vote count shown is ward average.)

=== Danesholme Ward (2 seats) ===
Location of Danesholme Ward

Corby Borough Council elections 2007: Danesholme Ward
Party	Candidate	Votes	%
Liberal Democrats	Chris Stanbra	652	26.2
Liberal Democrats	Barry O'Brien	582	23.4
Labour	Simon Green	373	15.0
Labour	Eddie Gordon	361	14.5
Conservative	Ray Boyd	276	11.0
Conservative	Julie Welsh	247	9.9

Ward summary
Party	Votes	% votes	Seats	Change
Liberal Democrats	617	49.5	2	
Labour	367	29.5	0	
Conservative	262	21.0	0	
Total votes cast	1246			
Electorate	3076			
Turnout	41.4			

(Vote count shown is ward average.)

=== East Ward (3 seats) ===
Location of East Ward

Corby Borough Council elections 2007: East Ward
Party	Candidate	Votes	%
Labour	Mark Pengelly	908	20.8
Labour	Pat Fawcett	890	20.4
Labour	David Harley	827	18.9
Conservative	Jenny Cummings	607	13.9
Conservative	Kevin Watt	573	13.1
Conservative	Karen Parker	566	12.9

Ward summary
Party	Votes	% votes	Seats	Change
Labour	875	60.1	3	
Conservative	582	39.9	0	
Total votes cast	1,457			
Electorate	4802			
Turnout	34.0			

(Vote count shown is ward average.)

=== Exeter Ward (1 seat) ===
Location of Exeter Ward

Corby Borough Council elections 2007: Exeter Ward
Party	Candidate	Votes	%
Labour	John O'Neill	294	71.2
Conservative	Jan Segal	119	28.8

Ward summary
Party	Votes	% votes	Seats	Change
Labour	294	71.2	1	
Conservative	119	28.8	0	0
Total votes cast	413			
Electorate	1445			
Turnout	28.8			

(Vote count shown is ward average.)

=== Great Oakley (1 seat) ===
Location of Great Oakley Ward

Corby Borough Council elections 2007: Great Oakley
Party	Candidate	Votes	%
Conservative	Ray Jackson	433	65.3
Labour	Aileen McKellar	230	34.7

Ward summary
Party	Votes	% votes	Seats	Change
Conservative	433	65.3	1	0
Labour	230	34.7	0	0
Total votes cast	671			
Electorate	1560			
Turnout	43.0			

(Vote count shown is ward average.)

=== Kingswood Ward (3 seats) ===
Location of Kingswood Ward

Corby Borough Council elections 2007: Kingswood Ward
Party	Candidate	Votes	%
Labour	John McGhee	708	24.7
Labour	Maureen Forshaw	705	24.6
Labour	Bryan Massie	651	22.7
Conservative	Sean Finnegan	454	15.8
Liberal Democrats	Mohammed Chaudhury	345	12.1

Ward summary
Party	Votes	% votes	Seats	Change
Labour	688	46.3	3	
Conservative	454	30.5	0	
Liberal Democrats	345	23.2	0	
Total votes cast	1,487			
Electorate	4,427			
Turnout	30.0			

(Vote count shown is ward average.)

=== Lodge Park (2 seats) ===
Location of Lodge Park Ward

Corby Borough Council elections 2007: Lodge Park Ward
Party	Candidate	Votes	%
Labour	Bob Eyles	511	35.4
Conservative	Christopher Woolmer	466	32.3
Labour	Mark Hill	465	32.2

Ward summary
Party	Votes	% votes	Seats	Change
Labour	488	51.2	1	
Conservative	466	48.8	1	
Total votes cast	954			
Electorate	2,623			
Turnout	37.3			

(Vote count shown is ward average.)

=== Oakley Vale Ward (3 seats) ===
Location of Oakley Vale Ward

Corby Borough Council elections 2007: Oakley Vale Ward
Party	Candidate	Votes	%
Conservative	Abby Marshall	429	17.8
Conservative	Eve Howitt	413	17.1
Conservative	David Sims	360	14.9
Labour	Keith Hudson	331	13.7
Labour	Sam Hagen	329	13.6
Labour	Madeline Whiteman	319	13.2
Liberal Democrats	Cathy O'Brien	141	5.8
Independent	Don Maguire	90	3.7

Ward summary
Party	Votes	% votes	Seats	Change
Conservative	401	41.9	3	
Labour	326	34.0	0	
Liberal Democrats	141	14.7	0	
Independent	90	9.4	0	
Total votes cast	958			
Electorate	3,636			
Turnout	25.8			

(Vote count shown is ward average.)

=== Rowlett Ward (2 seats) ===
Location of Rowlett Ward

Corby Borough Council elections 2007: Rowlett Ward
Party	Candidate	Votes	%
Labour	Jean Addison	682	
Labour	Willie Latta	630	
Conservative	Stan Fleming	424	
Conservative	Lynn Wilson	364	

Ward summary
Party	Votes	% votes	Seats	Change
Labour	656	62.5	2	
Conservative	394	37.5	0	
Total votes cast	1,050			
Electorate	3,338			
Turnout	34.1			

(Vote count shown is ward average.)

=== Rural West Ward (1 seat) ===
Location of Rural West Ward

Corby Borough Council elections 2003: Rural West Ward
Party	Candidate	Votes	%
Conservative	Bob Rutt	439	62.0
Green	Bob Riley	129	18.2
Labour	Gary McNeil	80	11.3
Liberal Democrats	Sidney Beecroft	60	8.5

Ward summary
Party	Votes	% votes	Seats	Change
Conservative	439	62.0	1	
Green	129	18.2	0	
Labour	80	11.3	0	
Liberal Democrats	60	8.5	0	
Total votes cast	708			
Electorate	1,382			
Turnout	51.3			

(Vote count shown is ward average.)

=== Shire Lodge (2 seats) ===
Location of Shire Lodge Ward

Corby Borough Council elections 2007: Shire Lodge Ward
Party	Candidate	Votes	%
Labour	Tom Beattie	601	33.7
Labour	Ray Beeby	548	30.8
Conservative	Sandy Torrie	345	19.4
Conservative	Richard Seaby	287	16.1

Ward summary
Party	Votes	% votes	Seats	Change
Labour	575	64.6	2	
Conservative	316	35.4	0	
Total votes cast	892			
Electorate	3,366			
Turnout	28.8			

(Vote count shown is ward average.)

=== Stanion and Corby Village Ward (2 seats) ===
Location of Stanion and Corby Village Ward

Corby Borough Council elections 2007: Stanion and Corby Village Ward
Party	Candidate	Votes	%
Conservative	Ray Lilley	551	40.8
Conservative	Stan Heggs	527	39.0
Labour	Dennis Taylor	274	20.3

Ward summary
Party	Votes	% votes	Seats	Change
Conservative	539	66.3	2	
Labour	274	33.7	0	
Total votes cast	813			
Electorate	1,762			
Turnout	44.7			

(Vote count shown is ward average.)

=== Tower Hill Ward (2 seats) ===
Location of Tower Hill Ward

Corby Borough Council elections 2007: Tower Hill Ward
Party	Candidate	Votes	%
Liberal Democrats	Eddie McGeown	455	24.0
Labour	Peter McEwan	445	23.5
Labour	Bob Scott	411	21.7
Conservative	Becky Barton	300	15.8
Conservative	Becky Barton	286	15.1

Ward summary
Party	Votes	% votes	Seats	Change
Liberal Democrats	455	38.7	1	
Labour	428	36.4	1	
Conservative	293	24.9	0	
Total votes cast	1,176			
Electorate	3,021			
Turnout	36.2			

(Vote count shown is ward average.)

=== Weldon and Gretton Ward (2 seats) ===
Location of Weldon and Gretton Ward

Corby Borough Council elections 2007: Weldon and Gretton Ward
Party	Candidate	Votes	%
Liberal Democrats	Phil Bromhall	607	28.8
Liberal Democrats	Terri Meechan	469	22.2
Conservative	Tony Segal	449	21.3
Conservative	Andrew Howard	424	20.1
Labour	Nikki Nissim	161	7.6

Ward summary
Party	Votes	% votes	Seats	Change
Liberal Democrats	538	47.4	2	
Conservative	437	38.5	0	
Labour	161	14.2	0	
Total votes cast	1,136			
Electorate	2,515			
Turnout	46.7			

(Vote count shown is ward average.)

== See also ==
- Corby (UK Parliament constituency)
