= 1995 Corby Borough Council election =

1995 UK local government election

← 1991	4 May 1995	1999 →

All 27 seats in the Corby Borough Council 14 seats needed for a majority
- Turnout: 49.6%

	First party	Second party	Third party
Party	Labour	Liberal Democrats	Conservative
Last election	23 seats, 58.2%	2 seats, 5.9%	1 seat, 32.3%
Seats won	24	2	1
Seat change	▲1	Steady	Steady
Popular vote	12,740	973	2,930
Percentage	67.4%	5.1%	15.5%
Swing	▲9.2%	▼0.8%	▼16.8%
- Map showing the results of the 1995 Corby Borough Council elections.
Council control before election
Labour
Council control after election
Labour

The 1995 Corby District Council election took place on 4 May 1995 to elect members of Corby Borough Council in Northamptonshire, England. This was on the same day as other local elections. The Labour Party retained overall control of the council, which it had held continuously since 1979.

== Ward-by-Ward Results ==
=== Central Ward (3 seats) ===
Location of Central ward

Corby Borough Council Elections 1995: Central
Party	Candidate	Votes	%
Labour	T. McConnachie	1,343	
Labour	J. Noble	1,244	
Labour	J. Muray	1,239	
Conservative	F. Buckthorpe	295	
Conservative	D. Sharman	249	
Corby First Labour	J. Hazel	209	
Corby First Labour	W. Mutch	196	
Corby First Labour	S. McIntosh	185	
Turnout			46%
Labour hold			
Labour hold			
Labour hold			

=== Danesholme Ward (3 seats) ===
Location of Danesholme ward

Corby Borough Council Elections 1995: Danesholme
Party	Candidate	Votes	%
Labour	J. Carr	1,177	
Labour	A. Hill	1,157	
Labour	M. Forshaw	1,031	
Corby First Labour	J. Breen	351	
Corby First Labour	R. Hayburn	319	
Corby First Labour	T. McGivern	319	
Conservative	Y. Von Bujtar	295	
Liberal Democrats	C. Stanbra	250	
Liberal Democrats	K. Scudder	205	
Liberal Democrats	R. Luck	203	
Turnout			46%
Labour hold			
Labour hold			
Labour hold			

=== East Ward (2 seats) ===
Location of East ward

Corby Borough Council Elections 1995: East
Party	Candidate	Votes	%
Labour	D. Taylor	847	
Labour	M. Pengelly	842	
Corby First Labour	M. Cochrane	173	
Corby First Labour	L. Gilbert	124	
Conservative	J. Tyagi	108	
Turnout			48%
Labour hold			
Labour gain from Independent			

=== Hazelwood Ward (3 seats) ===
Location of Hazelwood ward

Corby Borough Council Elections 1995: Hazelwood
Party	Candidate	Votes	%
Labour	A. Macleod	1,318	
Labour	R. Dalziel	1,297	
Labour	R. Hearne	1,290	
Corby First Labour	P. McGowan	400	
Corby First Labour	W. Mawdsley	303	
Corby First Labour	K. Glendinning	274	
Turnout			48%
Labour hold			
Labour hold			
Labour hold			

=== Kingswood Ward (3 seats) ===
Location of Kingswood ward

Corby Borough Council Elections 1995: Kingswood
Party	Candidate	Votes	%
Labour	J. Adamson	1,378	
Labour	E. Donald	1,270	
Labour	E. Gordon	1,166	
Conservative	T. Cadogan	329	
Corby First Labour	D. Laurance	251	
Corby First Labour	F. Marshall	240	
Corby First Labour	J. Telfer	233	
Turnout			37%
Labour hold			
Labour hold			
Labour hold			

=== Lloyds Ward (3 seats) ===
Location of Lloyds ward

Corby Borough Council Elections 1995: Lloyds
Party	Candidate	Votes	%
Labour	J. Kane	1,779	
Labour	G. McCart	1,472	
Labour	S. Hagen	1,333	
Conservative	G. Ellenton	384	
Corby First Labour	M. Crosby	292	
Corby First Labour	V. Jones	206	
Turnout			52%
Labour hold			
Labour hold			
Labour hold			

=== Lodge Park Ward (3 seats) ===
Location of Lodge Park ward

Corby Borough Council Elections 1995: Lodge Park
Party	Candidate	Votes	%
Labour	J. Docherty	1,588	
Labour	G. Beale	1,550	
Labour	J. Field	1,416	
Conservative	C. Woolmer	373	
Corby First Labour	J.Sims	310	
Corby First Labour	A. Wilkinson	252	
Corby First Labour	J. McIntyre	233	
Turnout			49%
Labour hold			
Labour hold			
Labour hold			

=== Rural East Ward (1 seat) ===
Location of Rural East ward

Corby Borough Council Elections 1995: Rural East
Party	Candidate	Votes	%
Conservative	J. Jaffrey	500	
Labour	F. McNamee	431	
Turnout			49%
Conservative hold			

=== Rural North Ward (1 seat) ===
Location of Rural North ward

Corby Borough Council Elections 1995: Rural North
Party	Candidate	Votes	%
Liberal Democrats	A. Bianchi	384	
Labour	M. Halfpenny	239	
Turnout			61%
Liberal Democrats hold			

=== Rural West Ward (1 seat) ===
Location of Rural West ward

Corby Borough Council Elections 1995: Rural West
Party	Candidate	Votes	%
Liberal Democrats	R. Rutt	338	
Conservative	P. Buckby	242	
Labour	M. Smith	177	
Turnout			63%
Liberal Democrats hold			

=== Shire Lodge Ward (2 seats) ===
Location of Shire Lodge ward

Corby Borough Council Elections 1995: Shire Lodge
Party	Candidate	Votes	%
Labour	G. Crawley	1,176	
Labour	J. Cowling	1,073	
Conservative	A. Royle	155	
Corby First Labour	D. Sims	86	
Corby First Labour	P. Martin	86	
Turnout			48%
Labour hold			
Labour hold			

=== West Ward (2 seats) ===
Location of West ward

Corby Borough Council Elections 1995: West
Party	Candidate	Votes	%
Labour	R. Beeby	1,287	
Labour	W. Latta	1,246	
Conservative	L. Baker	249	
Corby First Labour	R. Telfer	201	
Corby First Labour	J. Skelton	198	
Turnout			48%
Labour hold			
Labour hold			
