= 1976 Corby District Council election =

1976 UK local government election

← 1973	6 May 1976	1979 →

All 27 seats in the Corby District Council 14 seats needed for a majority
- Turnout: 52.8%
	First party	Second party	Third party
Party	Conservative	Labour	Independent Socialist
Seats won	16	10	1
Popular vote	7,483	6,526	626
Percentage	45.2%	39.4%
- Map showing the results of the 1976 Corby District Council elections.
Council control before election
Labour
Council control after election
Conservative

The 1976 Corby District Council election took place on 6 May 1976 to elect members of Corby District Council in Northamptonshire, England. This was on the same day as other local elections. It was the first election be held under new ward boundaries. The Conservative Party gained overall control of the council from the Labour Party, for the first and only time in its history.

== Ward-by-Ward Results ==
=== Central Ward (3 seats) ===
Location of Central ward

Corby District Council Elections 1976: Central
Party	Candidate	Votes	%
Conservative	M. Perkins	914	
Conservative	H. Lear	874	
Labour	J. Thomson	846	
Labour	R. Evans	839	
Conservative	R. Garton	771	
Labour	T. Bayliffe	678	
Turnout			43.4%
Conservative win (new seat)			
Conservative win (new seat)			
Labour win (new seat)			

=== Danesholme Ward (3 seats) ===
Location of Danesholme ward

Corby District Council Elections 1976: Danesholme
Party	Candidate	Votes	%
Conservative	F. Goodman	410	
Conservative	W. Carey	383	
Conservative	R. Gillett	381	
Labour	J. Wallace	319	
Labour	W. Stewart	280	
Labour	A. Portman	277	
Liberal	J. Wood	170	
Turnout			47.8%
Conservative win (new seat)			
Conservative win (new seat)			
Conservative win (new seat)			

=== East Ward (2 seats) ===
Location of East ward

Corby District Council Elections 1976: East
Party	Candidate	Votes	%
Independent Socialist	T. Sykes	626	
Conservative	A. Pitcher	447	
Labour	R. Hipkiss	432	
Labour	J. Sims	405	
Conservative	T. Drummond-Young	389	
Turnout			56.4%
Independent win (new seat)			
Conservative win (new seat)			

=== Hazelwood Ward (3 seats) ===
Location of Hazelwood ward

Corby District Council Elections 1976: Hazelwood
Party	Candidate	Votes	%
Labour	P. McGowan	754	
Labour	W. Mawdsley	701	
Labour	K. Glendinning	699	
Conservative	L. Hallatt	554	
Communist	J. Reilly	149	
Turnout			32.3%
Labour win (new seat)			
Labour win (new seat)			
Labour win (new seat)			

=== Kingswood Ward (3 seats) ===
Location of Kingswood ward

Corby District Council Elections 1976: Kingswood
Party	Candidate	Votes	%
Conservative	A. Briggs	720	
Conservative	J. Campbell	708	
Conservative	G. Robertshaw	695	
Labour	J. Forshaw	615	
Labour	E. Donald	609	
Labour	G. Russell	554	
Liberal	F. Charge	199	
Communist	I. Merrilees	92	
Turnout			34.0%
Conservative win (new seat)			
Conservative win (new seat)			
Conservative win (new seat)			

=== Lloyds Ward (3 seats) ===
Location of Lloyds ward

Corby District Council Elections 1976: Lloyds
Party	Candidate	Votes	%
Conservative	D. Hindwood	1,299	
Labour	J. Kane	992	
Labour	E. Wright	753	
Labour	D. Moon	746	
Turnout			53.2%
Conservative win (new seat)			
Labour win (new seat)			
Labour win (new seat)			

=== Lodge Park Ward (3 seats) ===
Location of Lodge Park ward

Corby District Council Elections 1976: Lodge Park
Party	Candidate	Votes	%
Labour	B. Wright	797	
Labour	P. Floody	742	
Conservative	B. Pitcher	657	
Conservative	M. Swinburn	650	
Labour	W. Kearney	635	
Conservative	S. Heggs	566	
Liberal	A. Haigh	492	
Independent	A. Greer	282	
Turnout			46.1
Labour win (new seat)			
Labour win (new seat)			
Conservative win (new seat)			

=== Rural East Ward (1 seat) ===
Location of Rural East ward

Corby District Council Elections 1976: Rural East
Party	Candidate	Votes	%
Conservative	C. Bodin	442	
Independent	K. Farnham	288	
Labour	G. Reed	281	
Turnout			58.6%
Conservative win (new seat)			

=== Rural North Ward (1 seat) ===
Location of Rural North ward

Corby District Council Elections 1976: Rural North
Party	Candidate	Votes	%
Labour	R. Ogilvie	257	
Conservative	G. Woolston	244	
Independent	J. Canning	180	
Turnout			71.9%
Labour win (new seat)			

=== Rural West Ward (1 seat) ===
Location of Rural West ward

Corby District Council Elections 1976: Rural West
Party	Candidate	Votes	%
Conservative	R. Webster	489	
Labour	R. Crawley	109	
Turnout			58.6%
Conservative win (new seat)			

=== Shire Lodge Ward (2 seats) ===
Location of Shire Lodge ward

Corby District Council Elections 1976: Shire Lodge
Party	Candidate	Votes	%
Conservative	R. Sheridan	470	
Labour	G. McCart	450	
Conservative	H. Perry	443	
Labour	F. Smyth	414	
Communist	W. Clark	58	
Turnout			63.1%
Conservative win (new seat)			
Labour win (new seat)			

=== West Ward (2 seats) ===
Location of West ward

Corby District Council Elections 1976: West
Party	Candidate	Votes	%
Conservative	L. Baker	837	
Conservative	F. Harris	811	
Labour	P. Huckle	674	
Labour	C. Keeney	618	
Turnout			68.1%
Conservative win (new seat)			
Conservative win (new seat)			
