= 1973 Corby District Council election =

1973 UK local government election

7 June 1973	1976 →

All 33 seats in the Corby District Council 17 seats needed for a majority
- Turnout: 42.4%
	First party	Second party
Party	Labour	Independent
Seats won	29	2
Popular vote	6,118	1,386
Percentage	52.0%	11.8%
	Third party	Fourth party
Party	Conservative	Independent Socialist
Seats won	1	1
Popular vote	2,642	676
Percentage	22.4%
Council control after election
Labour

The 1973 Corby District Council election were the first elections to the newly created Corby District Council and took place on 7 June 1973 . This was on the same day as other local elections. The Local Government Act 1972 stipulated that the elected members were to shadow and eventually take over from the predecessor corporation on 1 April 1974. The election resulted in Labour gaining control of the council.

== Ward-by-Ward Results ==
=== Beanfield East Ward (3 seats) ===
Corby District Council Elections 1973: Beanfield East
Party	Candidate	Votes	%
Labour	K. Glendenning	462	
Labour	W. Mawdsley	361	
Labour	P. McGowan	361	
Communist	J. Reilly	109	
Turnout			20.6%
Labour win (new seat)			
Labour win (new seat)			
Labour win (new seat)			

=== Beanfield West Ward (6 seats) ===
Corby District Council Elections 1973: Beanfield West Ward
Party	Candidate	Votes	%
Labour	J. Forshaw	725	
Labour	C. Binley	712	
Labour	J. Wallace	704	
Labour	E. Donald	686	
Labour	C. Russell	685	
Labour	C. Keeney	665	
Conservative	D. Worrall	561	
Turnout			19.9%
Labour win (new seat)			
Labour win (new seat)			
Labour win (new seat)			
Labour win (new seat)			
Labour win (new seat)			
Labour win (new seat)			

=== Forest Gate Ward (3 seats) ===
Corby District Council Elections 1973: Forest Gate
Party	Candidate	Votes	%
Labour	E. Wright	910	
Labour	J. Sullivan	778	
Labour	A. Portman	775	
Conservative	M. Perkins	718	
Conservative	R. Gillett	575	
Conservative	J. Campbell	569	
Turnout			54.6%
Labour win (new seat)			
Labour win (new seat)			
Labour win (new seat)			

=== Gretton Ward (1 seat) ===
Corby District Council Elections 1973: Gretton
Party	Candidate	Votes	%
Labour	R. Ogilvie	233	
Independent	J. Canning	197	
Conservative	A. Campbell	119	
Turnout			64.4%
Labour win (new seat)			

=== Lodge Park Ward (3 seats) ===
Corby District Council Elections 1973: Lodge Park
Party	Candidate	Votes	%
Labour	P. Floody	661	
Labour	W. Stewart	550	
Labour	F. Smyth	491	
Liberal	W. Welford	442	
Conservative	M. Swinburn	389	
Turnout			34.4%
Labour win (new seat)			
Labour win (new seat)			
Labour win (new seat)			

=== Old Town Ward (3 seats) ===
Corby District Council Elections 1973: Old Town
Party	Candidate	Votes	%
Independent Socialist	T. Sykes	676	
Labour	B. Taylor	563	
Labour	P. Huckle	541	
Labour	K. O'Neill	529	
Turnout			39.1%
Independent win (new seat)			
Labour win (new seat)			
Labour win (new seat)			

=== Pen Green Ward (2 seats) ===
Corby District Council Elections 1973: Pen Green
Party	Candidate	Votes	%
Labour	B. Wright	654	
Labour	J. Carr	649	
Conservative	D. Ashburner	319	
Conservative	V. Wilkinson	281	

=== Rural West Ward (1 seat) ===
Corby District Council Elections 1973: Rural West
Party	Candidate	Votes	%
Conservative	R. Webster	212	
Independent	F. Glover	169	
VIC	M. York	125	
Labour	G. Bingley	95	
Turnout			61.3%
Conservative win (new seat)			

=== Stanion Ward (1 seat) ===
Corby District Council Elections 1973: Stanion
Party	Candidate	Votes	%
Independent	J. Lloyd	153	
Independent	J. Hopkins	138	
Labour	M. Perkins	79	
Turnout			57.5%
Independent win (new seat)			

=== Studfall Ward (6 seats) ===
Corby District Council Elections 1973: Studfall
Party	Candidate	Votes	%
Labour	J. Kane	1,133	
Labour	D. Moon	1,002	
Labour	C. Stewart	967	
Labour	E. Stewart	885	
Labour	G. McCart	855	
Labour	J. Cowling	800	
Communist	I. Reid	274	
Communist	H. Burry	236	
Turnout			24.1%
Labour win (new seat)			
Labour win (new seat)			
Labour win (new seat)			
Labour win (new seat)			
Labour win (new seat)			
Labour win (new seat)			

=== Town Centre (3 seats) ===
Corby District Council Elections 1973: Town Centre
Party	Candidate	Votes	%
Labour	T. Bayliffe	553	
Labour	H. Dobbs	487	
Labour	J. Gray	477	
Conservative	C. Lear	324	
Conservative	E. Barclay	309	
Conservative	I. McBride	253	
Independent	K. Farnham	143	
Turnout			29.1%
Labour win (new seat)			
Labour win (new seat)			
Labour win (new seat)			

=== Weldon Ward (1 seat) ===
Corby District Council Elections 1973: Weldon
Party	Candidate	Votes	%
Independent	J. Perrett	293	
Independent	G. Reed	214	
Labour	J. Copeland	129	
Turnout			58.1%
Independent win (new seat)			
