= 1979 Corby District Council election =

1979 UK local government election

← 1976	3 May 1979	1983 →

All 27 seats in the Corby District Council 14 seats needed for a majority
- Turnout: 78.6%

	First party	Second party	Third party
Party	Labour	Conservative	Independent
Last election	10 seats, 39.4%	16 seats, 45.2%	0 seats, 4.5%
Seats won	23	3	1
Seat change	▲13	▼13	0
Popular vote	15,910	10,701	1,507
Percentage	55.6%	37.4%	5.3%
Swing	▲16.2%	▼7.8%	▲0.8%
- Map showing the results of the 1979 Corby District Council elections.
Council control before election
Conservative
Council control after election
Labour

The 1979 Corby District Council election took place on 3 May 1979 to elect members of Corby District Council in Northamptonshire, England. This was on the same day as other local elections. The Labour Party regained overall control of the council which it had lost to the Conservative Party at the previous election in 1976. The council remained continuously under Labour control until the council was dissolved in 2021.

== Ward-by-Ward Results ==
=== Central Ward (3 seats) ===
Location of Central ward

Corby District Council Elections 1979: Central
Party	Candidate	Votes	%
Labour	J. Thomson	1,815	
Labour	J. Hazel	1,704	
Labour	J. Breen	1,703	
Conservative	M. Perkins	1,061	
Conservative	H. Lear	1,037	
Conservative	L. Buecheler	962	
Turnout			70.5%
Labour gain from Conservative			
Labour gain from Conservative			
Labour hold			

=== Danesholme Ward (3 seats) ===
Location of Danesholme ward

Corby District Council Elections 1979: Danesholme
Party	Candidate	Votes	%
Labour	R. Crawley	1,072	
Labour	R. Hayburn	1,066	
Labour	M. Forshaw	971	
Conservative	F. Goodman	967	
Conservative	W. Carey	912	
Conservative	R. Gillett	870	
Liberal	J. Wood	493	
Turnout			78.4%
Labour gain from Conservative			
Labour gain from Conservative			
Labour gain from Conservative			

=== East Ward (2 seats) ===
Location of East ward

Corby District Council Elections 1979: East
Party	Candidate	Votes	%
Independent	E. Wright	877	
Labour	T. Sykes	871	
Labour	B. Brown	537	
Conservative	A. Pitcher	485	
Turnout			69.2%
Independent hold			
Labour gain from Conservative			

=== Hazelwood Ward (3 seats) ===
Location of Hazelwood ward

Corby District Council Elections 1979: Hazelwood
Party	Candidate	Votes	%
Labour	P. McGowan	2,048	
Labour	K. Glendinning	1,917	
Labour	W. Mawdsley	1,864	
Conservative	M. Burr	721	
Conservative	J. Smith	717	
Conservative	K. Farnham	606	
Turnout			63.9%
Labour hold			
Labour hold			
Labour hold			

=== Kingswood Ward (3 seats) ===
Location of Kingswood ward

Corby District Council Elections 1979: Kingswood
Party	Candidate	Votes	%
Labour	A. Kane	1,758	
Labour	A. Mathie	1,645	
Labour	K. Locker	1,623	
Conservative	A. Briggs	1,208	
Conservative	J. Campbell	1,130	
Conservative	G. Robertshaw	1,096	
Turnout			64.1%
Labour gain from Conservative			
Labour gain from Conservative			
Labour gain from Conservative			

=== Lloyds Ward (3 seats) ===
Location of Lloyds ward

Corby District Council Elections 1979: Lloyds
Party	Candidate	Votes	%
Labour	J. Kane	1,966	
Labour	R. Hipkiss	1,589	
Conservative	D. Hindwood	1,585	
Labour	D. Moon	1,557	
Conservative	A. Musson	1,070	
Turnout			86.2%
Conservative hold			
Labour hold			
Labour hold			

=== Lodge Park Ward (3 seats) ===
Location of Lodge Park ward

Corby District Council Elections 1979: Lodge Park
Party	Candidate	Votes	%
Labour	B. Wright	2,251	
Labour	P. Floody	2,119	
Labour	J. Sims	2,064	
Conservative	J. Smith	1,290	
Conservative	S. Heggs	1,120	
Turnout			74.8%
Labour hold			
Labour hold			
Labour gain from Conservative			

=== Rural East Ward (1 seat) ===
Location of Rural East ward

Corby District Council Elections 1979: Rural East
Party	Candidate	Votes	%
Conservative	R. Kimmons	711	
Independent	C. Bodin	426	
Labour	A. MacLeod	394	
Turnout			82.8%
Conservative hold			

=== Rural North Ward (1 seat) ===
Location of Rural North ward

Corby District Council Elections 1979: Rural North
Party	Candidate	Votes	%
Labour	R. Ogilvie	371	
Conservative	G. Woolston	243	
Independent	J. Canning	210	
Turnout			85.3%
Labour hold			

=== Rural West Ward (1 seat) ===
Location of Rural West ward

Corby District Council Elections 1979: Rural West
Party	Candidate	Votes	%
Conservative	R. Webster	666	
Labour	M. Phipps	210	
Turnout			81.9%
Conservative hold			

=== Shire Lodge Ward (2 seats) ===
Location of Shire Lodge ward

Corby District Council Elections 1979: Shire Lodge
Party	Candidate	Votes	%
Labour	G. Crawley	1,229	
Labour	A. Davidson	1,171	
Conservative	R. Sheridan	647	
Conservative	H. Perry	573	
Turnout			73.3%
Labour gain from Conservative			
Labour hold			

=== West Ward (2 seats) ===
Location of West ward

Corby District Council Elections 1979: West
Party	Candidate	Votes	%
Labour	J. Adamson	1,919	
Labour	E. Donald	1,667	
Conservative	L. Baker	1,117	
Conservative	F. Harris	996	
Turnout			76.8%
Labour gain from Conservative			
Labour gain from Conservative			
