= 1987 Corby District Council election =

Local English Council election

← 1983	7 May 1987	1991 →

All 27 seats in the Corby District Council 14 seats needed for a majority

	First party	Second party	Third party
Party	Labour	Conservative	Independent
Last election	24 seats, 58.0%	3 seats, 37.0%	N/A
Seats won	23	2	2
Seat change	▼1	▼1	▲2
Popular vote	11,077	7,026	975
Percentage	51.6%	32.7%	4.5%
Swing	▼6.4%	▼4.3%	▲4.5%
- Map showing the results of the 1987 Corby District Council elections.
Council control before election
Labour
Council control after election
Labour

The 1987 Corby District Council election took place on 7 May 1987 to elect members of Corby District Council in Northamptonshire, England. This was on the same day as other local elections. The Labour Party retained overall control of the council, which it had held since 1979.

== Ward-by-Ward Results ==
=== Central Ward (3 seats) ===
Location of Central ward

Corby District Council Elections 1987: Central
Party	Candidate	Votes	%
Labour	J. Thomson	1,031	
Labour	T. McConnachie	1,025	
Labour	J. Hazel	1,013	
Conservative	R. Marshall	818	
Conservative	F. Buckthorpe	782	
Conservative	L. Buecheler	714	
Alliance	C. Ellison	334	
Turnout			51.5%
Labour hold			
Labour hold			
Labour hold			

=== Danesholme Ward (3 seats) ===
Location of Danesholme ward

Corby District Council Elections 1987: Danesholme
Party	Candidate	Votes	%
Labour	M. Mawdsley	922	
Labour	R. Hayburn	916	
Labour	J. Breen	908	
Conservative	F. Goodman	624	
Conservative	J. Bowman	624	
Conservative	S. Heggs	503	
Alliance	D. Berry	456	
Alliance	J. Lundy	284	
Alliance	G. Ellison	269	
Turnout			52.6%
Labour hold			
Labour hold			
Labour hold			

=== East Ward (2 seats) ===
Location of East ward

Corby District Council Elections 1987: East
Party	Candidate	Votes	%
Labour	E. Wright	600	
Independent	T. Sykes	527	
Conservative	M. Cochrane	486	
Conservative	T. Drummond-Young	371	
Turnout			53.6%
Labour hold			
Independent gain from Labour			

=== Hazelwood Ward (3 seats) ===
Location of Hazelwood ward

Corby District Council Elections 1987: Hazelwood
Party	Candidate	Votes	%
Labour	P. McGowan	1,145	
Labour	W. Mawdsley	1,081	
Labour	K. Glendinning	1,080	
Alliance	M. Mahon	406	
Alliance	J. Collins	402	
Conservative	M. Payne	401	
Communist	J. Reilly	176	
Turnout			42.7%
Labour hold			
Labour hold			
Labour hold			

=== Kingswood Ward (3 seats) ===
Location of Kingswood ward

Corby District Council Elections 1987: Kingswood
Party	Candidate	Votes	%
Labour	A. Irwin	1,246	
Labour	T. McGivern	1,189	
Labour	E. Donald	1,170	
Alliance	W. Stewart	551	
Alliance	J. Wood	529	
Conservative	C. Reeves	445	
Alliance	J. King	430	
Turnout			43.4%
Labour hold			
Labour hold			
Labour hold			

=== Lloyds Ward (3 seats) ===
Location of Lloyds ward

Corby District Council Elections 1987: Lloyds
Party	Candidate	Votes	%
Labour	J. Kane	1,452	
Conservative	D. Hindwood	1,414	
Labour	R. Hipkiss	1,290	
Labour	J. Noble	969	
Conservative	T. Strickland	916	
Turnout			60.1%
Labour hold			
Conservative hold			

=== Lodge Park Ward (3 seats) ===
Location of Lodge Park ward

Corby District Council Elections 1987: Lodge Park
Party	Candidate	Votes	%
Labour	B. Wright	1,736	
Labour	J. Sims	1,608	
Labour	P. Floody	1,509	
Conservative	C. Woolmer	914	
Turnout			52.0%
Labour hold			
Labour hold			
Labour hold			

=== Rural East Ward (1 seat) ===
Location of Rural East ward

Corby District Council Elections 1987: Rural East
Party	Candidate	Votes	%
Conservative	R. Kimmons	707	
Labour	K. Locker	319	
Turnout			56.2%
Conservative hold			

=== Rural North Ward (1 seat) ===
Location of Rural North ward

Corby District Council Elections 1987: Rural North
Party	Candidate	Votes	%
Labour	R. Ogilvie	288	
Alliance	A. Bianchi	261	
Conservative	J. Woolston	195	
Turnout			72.6%
Labour hold			
Labour gain from Independent			

=== Rural West Ward (1 seat) ===
Location of Rural West ward

Corby District Council Elections 1987: Rural West
Party	Candidate	Votes	%
Independent	R. Webster	448	
Alliance	H. Finlay-Norman	200	
Labour	M. Forshaw	108	
Turnout			64.2%
Independent gain from Conservative			

=== Shire Lodge Ward (2 seats) ===
Location of Shire Lodge ward

Corby District Council Elections 1987: Shire Lodge
Party	Candidate	Votes	%
Labour	G. Crawley	1,004	
Labour	J. Cowling	805	
Conservative	G. Bruce	463	
Turnout			47.1%
Labour hold			
Labour hold			

=== West Ward (2 seats) ===
Location of West ward

Corby District Council Elections 1987: West
Party	Candidate	Votes	%
Labour	J. Adamson	1,226	
Labour	R. Telfer	1,196	
Conservative	S. Gregory	674	
Conservative	F. Snape	588	
Turnout			48.7%
Labour hold			
Labour hold			
