= 1991 Corby District Council election =

1991 UK local government election

← 1987	2 May 1991	1995 →

All 27 seats in the Corby District Council 14 seats needed for a majority
- Turnout: 47.7%

	First party	Second party
Party	Labour	Liberal Democrats
Last election	23 seats, 51.6%	0 seats, 10.3%
Seats won	23	2
Seat change	0	▲2
Popular vote	8,837	895
Percentage	58.2%	5.9%
Swing	▲6.8%	▼4.3%
	Third party	Fourth party
Party	Conservative	Independent
Last election	2 seats, 32.7%	2 seats, 4.5%
Seats won	1	1
Seat change	▼1	▼1
Popular vote	4,913	547
Percentage	32.3%	3.6%
Swing	▼0.4%	▼0.9%
- Map showing the results of the 1991 Corby District Council elections.
Council control before election
Labour
Council control after election
Labour

The 1991 Corby District Council election took place on 2 May 1991 to elect members of Corby District Council in Northamptonshire, England. This was on the same day as other local elections. The Labour Party retained overall control of the council, which it had held since 1979.

== Ward-by-Ward Results ==
=== Central Ward (3 seats) ===
Location of Central ward

Corby District Council Elections 1991: Central
Party	Candidate	Votes	%
Labour	T. McConnachie	952	
Labour	J. Hazel	918	
Labour	J. Noble	877	
Conservative	F. Buckthorpe	524	
Conservative	M. Anglin	464	
Turnout			40.6%
Labour hold			
Labour hold			
Labour hold			

=== Danesholme Ward (3 seats) ===
Location of Danesholme ward

Corby District Council Elections 1991: Danesholme
Party	Candidate	Votes	%
Labour	R. Hayburn	1,080	
Labour	M. Mawdsley	1,064	
Labour	J. Breen	1,063	
Conservative	P. Clayton	619	
Conservative	J. Hill-Wilson	478	
Conservative	S. Foulkes	472	
Turnout			45.0%
Labour hold			
Labour hold			
Labour hold			

=== East Ward (2 seats) ===
Location of East ward

Corby District Council Elections 1991: East
Party	Candidate	Votes	%
Labour	M. Cochrane	601	
Independent	T. Sykes	547	
Labour	Wade J.	542	
Conservative	Connors J.	256	
Turnout			45.3%
Labour hold			
Independent hold			

=== Hazelwood Ward (3 seats) ===
Location of Hazelwood ward

Corby District Council Elections 1991: Hazelwood
Party	Candidate	Votes	%
Labour	P. McGowan	1,193	
Labour	W. Mawdsley	1,051	
Labour	K. Glendinning	969	
Conservative	B. Pitcher	411	
Turnout			38.6%
Labour hold			
Labour hold			
Labour hold			

=== Kingswood Ward (3 seats) ===
Location of Kingswood ward

Corby District Council Elections 1991: Kingswood
Party	Candidate	Votes	%
Labour	T. McGivern	1,166	
Labour	E. Donald	1,125	
Labour	W. Hilbourne	1,035	
Conservative	Y. Von-Bujtar	762	
Conservative	L. Cheatley	754	
Conservative	P. Cheatley	751	
Turnout			42.4%
Labour hold			
Labour hold			
Labour hold			

=== Lloyds Ward (3 seats) ===
Location of Lloyds ward

Corby District Council Elections 1991: Lloyds
Party	Candidate	Votes	%
Labour	J. Kane		
Labour	M. Crosby		
Labour	R. Hipkiss		
Labour hold			
Labour gain from Conservative			
Labour hold			

=== Lodge Park Ward (3 seats) ===
Location of Lodge Park ward

Corby District Council Elections 1991: Lodge Park
Party	Candidate	Votes	%
Labour	A. Wilkinson	1,346	
Labour	J.Sims	1,330	
Labour	C. Hall	1,271	
Conservative	C. Woolmer	604	
Conservative	R. Wylie	571	
Conservative	J. Woolmer	536	
Turnout			45.5%
Labour hold			
Labour hold			
Labour hold			

=== Rural East Ward (1 seat) ===
Location of Rural East ward

Corby District Council Elections 1991: Rural East
Party	Candidate	Votes	%
Conservative	E. Sayer	605	
Labour	I. Wood	324	
Liberal Democrats	C. Passmore	141	
Turnout			57.8%
Conservative hold			

=== Rural North Ward (1 seat) ===
Location of Rural North ward

Corby District Council Elections 1991: Rural North
Party	Candidate	Votes	%
Liberal Democrats	A. Bianchi	372	
Labour	R. Ogilvie	252	
Conservative	G. Ellenton	97	
Turnout			71.6%
Liberal Democrats gain from Labour			

=== Rural West Ward (1 seat) ===
Location of Rural West ward

Corby District Council Elections 1991: Rural West
Party	Candidate	Votes	%
Liberal Democrats	J. Trevor	382	
Conservative	R. Webster	286	
Turnout			56.0%
Liberal Democrats gain from Independent			

=== Shire Lodge Ward (2 seats) ===
Location of Shire Lodge ward

Corby District Council Elections 1991: Shire Lodge
Party	Candidate	Votes	%
Labour	G. Crawley	778	
Labour	J. Cowling	609	
Conservative	S. Young	310	
Turnout			37.4%
Labour hold			
Labour hold			

=== West Ward (2 seats) ===
Location of West ward

Corby District Council Elections 1991: West
Party	Candidate	Votes	%
Labour	J. Adamson	1,145	
Labour	R. Telfer	1,060	
Conservative	W. Robson	439	
Conservative	L. Baker	406	
Turnout			44.8%
Labour hold			
Labour hold			
