= 1983 Corby District Council election =

1983 UK local government election

← 1979	5 May 1983	1987 →

All 27 seats in the Corby District Council 14 seats needed for a majority
- Turnout: 54.5%

	First party	Second party
Party	Labour	Conservative
Last election	23 seats, 55.6%	3 seats, 37.4%
Seats won	24	3
Seat change	▲1	0
Popular vote	11,460	7,312
Percentage	58.0%	37.0%
Swing	▲2.4%	▼0.4%
- Map showing the results of the 1983 Corby District Council elections.
Council control before election
Labour
Council control after election
Labour

The 1983 Corby District Council election took place on 5 May 1983 to elect members of Corby District Council in Northamptonshire, England. This was on the same day as other local elections. The Labour Party retained overall control of the council, which it had gained at the previous election in 1979.

== Ward-by-Ward Results ==
=== Central Ward (3 seats) ===
Location of Central ward

Corby District Council Elections 1983: Central
Party	Candidate	Votes	%
Labour	J. Hazel	1,166	
Labour	J. Breen	1,119	
Labour	R. Crawley	1,074	
Conservative	R. Marshall	613	
Conservative	J. Bowman	548	
Conservative	I. McBride	540	
Turnout			50.4%
Labour hold			
Labour hold			
Labour hold			

=== Danesholme Ward (3 seats) ===
Location of Danesholme ward

Corby District Council Elections 1983: Danesholme
Party	Candidate	Votes	%
Labour	R. Hayburn	1,067	
Labour	M. Mawdsley	978	
Labour	R. Lochore	926	
Conservative	F. Goodman	698	
Conservative	F. Harris	581	
Turnout			50.6%
Labour hold			
Labour hold			
Labour hold			

=== East Ward (2 seats) ===
Location of East ward

Corby District Council Elections 1983: East
Party	Candidate	Votes	%
Labour	E. Wright	766	
Labour	T. McIntosh	620	
Conservative	R. Stewart	408	
Turnout			53.6%
Labour hold			
Labour gain from Independent			

=== Hazelwood Ward (3 seats) ===
Location of Hazelwood ward

Corby District Council Elections 1983: Hazelwood
Party	Candidate	Votes	%
Labour	K. Glendinning	1,202	
Labour	P. McGowan	1,189	
Labour	W. Mawdsley	1,172	
Conservative	R. Shaw	454	
Communist	J. Reilly	205	
Turnout			41.6%
Labour hold			
Labour hold			
Labour hold			

=== Kingswood Ward (3 seats) ===
Location of Kingswood ward

Corby District Council Elections 1983: Kingswood
Party	Candidate	Votes	%
Labour	T. McConnachie	1,169	
Labour	L. Locker	1,164	
Labour	J. Forshaw	1,136	
Conservative	A. Briggs	732	
Alliance	W. Stewart	715	
Conservative	J. Campbell	711	
Conservative	D. Gardner	654	
Alliance	J. Wood	612	
Alliance	J. King	542	
Turnout			64.5%
Labour hold			
Labour hold			
Labour hold			

=== Lloyds Ward (3 seats) ===
Location of Lloyds ward

Corby District Council Elections 1983: Lloyds
Party	Candidate	Votes	%
Labour	J. Jane	1,430	
Conservative	D. Hindwood	1,357	
Labour	R. Hipkiss	1,249	
Labour	T. McConnachie	1,106	
Conservative	P. Aitken	1,008	
Turnout			59.5%
Labour hold			
Conservative hold			
Labour hold			

=== Lodge Park Ward (3 seats) ===
Location of Lodge Park ward

Corby District Council Elections 1983: Lodge Park
Party	Candidate	Votes	%
Labour	B. Wright	1,500	
Labour	P. Floody	1,359	
Labour	J.Sims	1,339	
Conservative	K. Lee	645	
Turnout			45.2%
Labour hold			
Labour hold			
Labour hold			

=== Rural East Ward (1 seat) ===
Location of Rural East ward

Corby District Council Elections 1983: Rural East
Party	Candidate	Votes	%
Conservative	R. Kimmons	661	
Labour	D. Copeland	382	
Turnout			58.3%
Conservative hold			

=== Rural North Ward (1 seat) ===
Location of Rural North ward

Corby District Council Elections 1983: Rural North
Party	Candidate	Votes	%
Labour	R. Ogilvie	385	
Conservative	J. Woolston	334	
Turnout			71.5%
Conservative hold			
Labour hold			

=== Rural West Ward (1 seat) ===
Location of Rural West ward

Corby District Council Elections 1983: Rural West
Party	Candidate	Votes	%
Conservative	R. Webster	511	
Labour	M. Forshaw	172	
Turnout			62.8%
Conservative hold			

=== Shire Lodge Ward (2 seats) ===
Location of Shire Lodge ward

Corby District Council Elections 1983: Shire Lodge
Party	Candidate	Votes	%
Labour	G. Crawley	908	
Labour	A. Davidson	743	
Conservative	J. Goodall	313	
Conservative	S. Portman	284	
Communist	I. Reid	76	
Turnout			47.9%
Labour hold			
Labour hold			

=== West Ward (2 seats) ===
Location of West ward

Corby District Council Elections 1983: West
Party	Candidate	Votes	%
Labour	J. Adamson	1,313	
Labour	E. Donald	1,180	
Conservative	L. Baker	586	
Conservative	P. Purcell	532	
Turnout			48.3%
Labour hold			
Labour hold			
