= 2015 Corby Borough Council election =

2015 council election in Northamptonshire, England

- 7 May 2015

All 29 seats in the Corby Borough Council 15 seats needed for a majority

	First party	Second party
Party	Labour	Conservative
Last election	22 seats, 56.0%	4 seats, 27.6%
Seats won	24	5
Seat change	▲2	▲1
Popular vote	15,475	8,120
Percentage	51.6%	27.1%
Swing	▼4.4%	▼0.5%
- Map showing the results of the 2015 Corby Borough Council elections.
Council control before election
Labour
Council control after election
Labour

The 2015 Corby Borough Council election took place on 7 May 2015 to elect members of Corby Borough Council in Northamptonshire, England. This was on the same day as other local elections. The Labour Party retained control of the council, which it had held continuously since 1979.

== Ward-by-Ward Results ==
=== Beanfield Ward (3 seats) ===
Location of Beanfield ward

Corby Borough Council Elections 2015: Beanfield Ward
Party	Candidate	Votes	%
Labour	Ann Brown	2,142	
Labour	Paul Beattie	2,112	
Labour	Mary Butcher	2,023	
Conservative	Ray Jackson	581	
Conservative	Jade Ruthven	523	
Conservative	Fran Heggs	467	
UKIP	Martin Allison	785	

=== Central Ward (2 seats) ===
Location of Central ward

Corby Borough Council Elections 2015: Central Ward
Party	Candidate	Votes	%
Labour	Lawrence Ferguson	1,277	
Labour	Anthony Dady	1,221	
Conservative	Eileen Kemp	538	
Conservative	Ann Williams May	315	

=== Danesholme Ward (2 seats) ===
Location of Danesholme ward

Corby Borough Council Elections 2015: Danesholme Ward
Party	Candidate	Votes	%
Labour	Colleen Cassidy	872	
Labour	Peter Petch	811	
Liberal Democrats	Chris Stanbra	751	
UKIP	Keith Hudson	436	
Conservative	Ray Boyd	423	
UKIP	Peter McGowan	413	
Conservative	Sarah Luke	233	

=== Kingswood and Hazel Leys Ward (3 seats) ===
Location of Kingswood and Hazel Leys ward

Corby Borough Council Elections 2015: Kingswood and Hazel Leys Ward
Party	Candidate	Votes	%
Labour	John McGhee	1,522	
Labour	Elise Elliston	1,472	
Labour	Kenneth Carratt	1,450	
UKIP	William Davies	606	
Conservative	Alison Rodden	399	
Conservative	Les Von Bujtar	314	
Conservative	Yvonne Von Bujtar	303	
Green	David Carr	275	
Green	Michael Mahon	218	

=== Lloyds Ward (3 seats) ===
Location of Lloyds ward

Corby Borough Council Elections 2015: Lloyds Ward
Party	Candidate	Votes	%
Labour	Mark Pengelly	2,083	
Labour	Lucy Goult	1,887	
Labour	Matt Reay	1,849	
Conservative	Sheila Griffin	665	
Conservative	Tracey Jardine	635	
Conservative	Marjorie Nicol	619	

=== Lodge Park (3 seats) ===
Location of Lodge Park ward

Corby Borough Council Elections 2015: Lodge Park Ward
Party	Candidate	Votes	%
Labour	Tom Beattie	2,033	
Labour	Bob Eyles	1,859	
Labour	Matt Keane	1,664	
UKIP	Stuart McKay	712	
Conservative	Christopher Woolmer	696	
Conservative	Jill McTaggart	609	
Conservative	Peter Atchison	508	

=== Oakley North Ward (2 seats) ===
Location of Oakley North ward

Corby Borough Council Elections 2015: Oakley North Ward
Party	Candidate	Votes	%
Labour	Raymond Beeby	702	
Labour	Peter McEwan	663	
Conservative	Eileen Sayer	564	
Conservative	Glenn Gideon Mbanugo	449	
UKIP	Patrick Coy	435	
Liberal Democrats	Luke Stanbra	164	

=== Oakley South Ward (3 seats) ===
Location of Oakley South ward

Corby Borough Council Elections 2015: Oakley South Ward
Party	Candidate	Votes	%
Labour	Judy Caine	1,647	
Conservative	David Sims	1,435	
Labour	Mohammed Rahman	1,382	
Labour	Clare Pavitt	1,334	
Conservative	Eve Howitt	1,321	
Conservative	Sandra Naden-Horley	1,146	

=== Rowlett Ward (2 seats) ===
Location of Rowlett ward

Corby Borough Council Elections 2015: Rowlett Ward
Party	Candidate	Votes	%
Labour	William Latta	1,380	
Labour	Jean Addison	1,325	
UKIP	David Donnelly	507	
Conservative	Ian Easton	399	
Conservative	Charlotte Hobby	346	

=== Rural West Ward (1 seat) ===
Location of Rural West ward

Corby Borough Council Elections 2015: Rural West Ward
Party	Candidate	Votes	%
Conservative	Robert Rutt	582	
Labour	Bob Riley	434	
Liberal Democrats	Sidney Beecroft	86	

=== Stanion and Corby Village Ward (2 seats) ===
Location of Stanion and Corby Village ward

Corby Borough Council Elections 2015: Stanion and Corby Village Ward
Party	Candidate	Votes	%
Labour	Julie Riley	665	
Labour	William Colquhoun	658	
Conservative	Stan Heggs	637	
Conservative	Phil Ewers	591	
UKIP	Kim McGowan	420	

=== Weldon and Gretton Ward (3 seats) ===
Location of Weldon and Gretton ward

Corby Borough Council Elections 2015: Weldon and Gretton Ward
Party	Candidate	Votes	%
Conservative	Robert McKellar	1,201	
Conservative	Bridget Watts	811	
Conservative	Kevin Watt	732	
Labour	Rob Newby	718	
Liberal Democrats	Terri Meechan	500	
Labour	Susan Witkowski	492	
UKIP	Fred Parker	468	
Labour	Martyn Reuby	454	
Green	Steven Scrutton	226	

== By-elections ==
=== Kingswood and Hazel Leys ===
Kingswood and Hazel Leys by-election, 9 February 2017
Party	Candidate	Votes	%	±%
Labour	Isabel McNab	610	64.6	+10.3
Conservative	Stan Heggs	252	26.7	+12.5
Green	Michael Mahon	82	8.7	−1.1
Majority		358	37.9	
Labour hold		Swing		

The Kingswood and Hazel Leys by-election was triggered by the disqualification for non-attendance of Kenneth Carratt, who had been elected as a Labour councillor in 2015.

=== Beanfield ===
Beanfield by-election, 10 October 2019
Party	Candidate	Votes	%	±%
Labour	Alison Dalziel	818	56.0	
Conservative	Raymond Matthew Boyd	497	34.0	
Liberal Democrats	Chris Stanbra	147	10.1	
Majority		321	22.0	
Labour hold		Swing		

The Beanfield by-election was triggered by the death of Labour councillor Mary Butcher.

=== Weldon and Gretton ===
Weldon and Gretton by-election, 12 December 2019
Party	Candidate	Votes	%	±%
Conservative	Alexandra Katharine Wellings	1,574	44.4	
Labour	Ann Wallington	1,223	34.5	
Independent	Lee Forster	381	10.7	
Liberal Democrats	Terri Meechan	369	10.4	
Majority		351	9.9	
Conservative hold		Swing		

The by-election was held on the same day as the 2019 United Kingdom general election. Gretton Parish Council had recorded in September 2019 that Conservative councillor Robert McKellar had considered resigning, but had initially withdrawn his resignation because it would trigger a by-election.
