= 2003 Corby Borough Council election =

2003 UK local government election

- 1 May 2003

All 29 seats in the Corby Borough Council 15 seats needed for a majority
| | First party | Second party | Third party |
|---|---|---|---|
| Party | Labour | Conservative | Liberal Democrats |
| Last election | 27 seats, 62.4% | 1 seat, 21.4% | 1 seat, 7.9% |
| Seats won | 18 | 9 | 2 |
| Seat change | ▼9 | ▲8 | ▲1 |
| Popular vote | 7,118 | 6,397 | 3,189 |
| Percentage | 40.3% | 36.2% | 18.0% |
| Swing | ▼22.1% | ▲14.8% | ▲10.1% |
- Map showing the results of the 2003 Corby Borough Council elections.
Council control before election
Labour
Council control after election
Labour

The 2003 Corby Borough Council election took place on 1 May 2003 to elect members of Corby Borough Council in Northamptonshire, England. The Labour Party retained overall control of the council, which it had held continuously since 1979.

== Results summary ==
The overall results, using average ward votes for the total number of votes cast, were as follows:

Corby Borough Council Elections 2003: Summary Results
| Party | Candidates | Votes | % Votes | Seats | % Seats | Change |
|---|---|---|---|---|---|---|
| Labour | 29 | 7,118 | 40.3 | 18 | 62.1 | -9 |
| Conservative | 18 | 6,397 | 36.2 | 9 | 31.0 | +8 |
| Liberal Democrats | 10 | 3,189 | 18.0 | 2 | +1 | |
| Independent | 3 | 967 | 5.5 | 0 | 6.9 | 0 |
| Total | 60 | 16,740 | | 29 | | |
| Electorate | | | | | | |
| Turnout | | | | | | |

(Vote counts shown are ward averages)

== Ward-by-Ward Results ==
=== Central Ward (3 seats) ===
Location of Central ward in Corby

Corby Borough Council Elections 2003: All Saints Ward
| Party | Candidate | Votes | % |
|---|---|---|---|
| Labour | James Noble | 661 | 21.9 |
| Conservative | Michael Rodden | 639 | 21.9 |
| Labour | John O'Neill | 595 | 20.4 |
| Labour | Robert Hearne | 579 | 19.8 |
| Liberal Democrats | Colin Barratt | 444 | 15.2 |

Ward Summary
| Party | Votes | % Votes | Seats | Change |
|---|---|---|---|---|
| Conservative | 639 | 37.7 | 1 | +1 |
| Labour | 612 | 36.1 | 2 | -1 |
| Liberal Democrats | 444 | 26.2 | 0 | 0 |
| Total Votes Cast | 1,695 | | | |
| Electorate | | | | |
| Turnout | | | | |

(Vote count shown is ward average)

=== Danesholme Ward (3 seats) ===
Location of Danesholme ward

Corby Borough Council Elections 2003: Danesholme Ward
| Party | Candidate | Votes | % |
|---|---|---|---|
| Conservative | Raymond Jackson | 720 | 14.4 |
| Conservative | Raymond Boyd | 690 | 13.8 |
| Liberal Democrats | Chris Stanbra | 687 | 13.8 |
| Labour | Alexis Hill | 638 | 12.8 |
| Liberal Democrats | Christopher Shelley | 623 | 12.5 |
| Labour | Keith Hudson | 619 | 12.4 |
| Labour | Joseph Spooner | 534 | 10.7 |
| Liberal Democrats | Richard Jones | 478 | 9.6 |

Ward Summary
| Party | Votes | % Votes | Seats | Change |
|---|---|---|---|---|
| Conservative | 705 | 37.1 | 2 | +2 |
| Labour | 597 | 31.5 | 0 | -3 |
| Liberal Democrats | 596 | 31.4 | 1 | +1 |
| Total Votes Cast | 1,898 | | | |
| Electorate | | | | |
| Turnout | | | | |

(Vote count shown is ward average)

=== East Ward (2 seats) ===
Location of East ward

Corby Borough Council Elections 2003: East Ward
| Party | Candidate | Votes | % |
|---|---|---|---|
| Labour | Mark Pengelly | 669 | 40.2 |
| Labour | Betty Wade | 464 | 27.9 |
| Conservative | Brian Cummings | 302 | 18.2 |
| Conservative | Bernard Howard | 228 | 13.7 |

Ward Summary
| Party | Votes | % Votes | Seats | Change |
|---|---|---|---|---|
| Labour | 567 | 68.1 | 2 | 0 |
| Conservative | 265 | 31.9 | 0 | 0 |
| Total Votes Cast | 832 | | | |
| Electorate | | | | |
| Turnout | | | | |

(Vote count shown is ward average)

=== Hazlewood Ward (3 seats) ===
Location of Hazlewood ward

Corby Borough Council Elections 2003: Hazlewood Ward
| Party | Candidate | Votes | % |
|---|---|---|---|
| Labour | Peter McEwan | 810 | 21.7 |
| Labour | Ann Ferns | 785 | 21.0 |
| Labour | Robert Scott | 748 | 20.1 |
| Conservative | Robert Tustin | 477 | 12.8 |
| Conservative | Clive Reed | 470 | 12.6 |
| Liberal Democrats | Karen Parker | 440 | 11.8 |

Ward Summary
| Party | Votes | % Votes | Seats | Change |
|---|---|---|---|---|
| Labour | 781 | 46.1 | 3 | 0 |
| Conservative | 474 | 27.9 | 0 | 0 |
| Liberal Democrats | 440 | 26.0 | 0 | 0 |
| Total Votes Cast | 1,695 | | | |
| Electorate | | | | |
| Turnout | | | | |

(Vote count shown is ward average)

=== Hillside Ward (1 seat) ===
Location of Hillside ward

Corby Borough Council Elections 2003: Hillside Ward
| Party | Candidate | Votes | % |
|---|---|---|---|
| Labour | Edwin Gordon | 229 | 37.4 |
| Liberal Democrats | Dominic Maguire | 213 | 34.7 |
| Conservative | William Owen | 171 | 27.9 |

Ward Summary
| Party | Votes | % Votes | Seats | Change |
|---|---|---|---|---|
| Labour | 229 | 37.4 | 1 | 0 |
| Liberal Democrats | 213 | 34.7 | 0 | 0 |
| Conservative | 171 | 27.9 | 0 | 0 |
| Total Votes Cast | 613 | | | |
| Electorate | | | | |
| Turnout | | | | |

(Vote count shown is ward average)

=== Kingswood Ward (3 seats) ===
Location of Kingswood ward

Corby Borough Council Elections 2003: Kingswood Ward
| Party | Candidate | Votes | % |
|---|---|---|---|
| Labour | Maureen Forshaw | 719 | 20.9 |
| Labour | Willie Smith | 650 | 18.9 |
| Labour | Bryan Massie | 644 | 18.8 |
| Conservative | Yvonne Von Bujtar | 562 | 16.4 |
| Conservative | Suman Sood | 441 | 12.8 |
| Liberal Democrats | Christopher Latham | 416 | 12.1 |

Ward Summary
| Party | Votes | % Votes | Seats | Change |
|---|---|---|---|---|
| Labour | 671 | 42.2 | 3 | 0 |
| Conservative | 502 | 31.6 | 0 | 0 |
| Liberal Democrats | 416 | 26.2 | 0 | 0 |
| Total Votes Cast | 743 | | | |
| Electorate | 2,534 | | | |
| Turnout | 29.3% | | | |

(Vote count shown is ward average)

=== Lloyds Ward (3 seats) ===
Location of Lloyds ward

Corby Borough Council Elections 2003: Lloyds Ward
| Party | Candidate | Votes | % |
|---|---|---|---|
| Labour | Jimmy Kane | 1,133 | 24.9 |
| Labour | Patricia Fawcett | 961 | 21.1 |
| Conservative | Sally Jones | 843 | 18.5 |
| Conservative | Stanley Fleming | 838 | 18.4 |
| Labour | Samuel Hagen | 773 | 17.0 |

Ward Summary
| Party | Votes | % Votes | Seats | Change |
|---|---|---|---|---|
| Labour | 956 | 53.2 | 2 | -1 |
| Conservative | 841 | 46.8 | 1 | +1 |
| Total Votes Cast | 1,796 | | | |
| Electorate | | | | |
| Turnout | | | | |

(Vote count shown is ward average)

=== Lodge Park (3 seats) ===
Location of Lodge Park ward

Corby Borough Council Elections 2003: Lodge Park Ward
| Party | Candidate | Votes | % |
|---|---|---|---|
| Conservative | Christopher Woolmer | 892 | 25.7 |
| Labour | Jean Addison | 708 | 20.4 |
| Labour | David Harley | 652 | 18.8 |
| Labour | Mark Hill | 634 | 18.3 |
| Liberal Democrats | Julie Connachie | 581 | 16.8 |

Ward Summary
| Party | Votes | % Votes | Seats | Change |
|---|---|---|---|---|
| Conservative | 892 | 41.7 | 1 | +1 |
| Labour | 665 | 31.1 | 2 | -1 |
| Liberal Democrats | 581 | 27.2 | 0 | 0 |
| Total Votes Cast | 2,138 | | | |
| Electorate | | | | |
| Turnout | | | | |

(Vote count shown is ward average)

=== Rural East Ward (2 seats) ===
Location of Rural East ward

Corby Borough Council Elections 2003: Rural East Ward
| Party | Candidate | Votes | % |
|---|---|---|---|
| Conservative | Stanley Heggs | 761 | 37.9 |
| Conservative | Andrew Howard | 588 | 29.3 |
| Labour | John Kane | 260 | 13.0 |
| Independent | George Reed | 232 | 11.6 |
| Labour | Ashok Nathwani | 166 | 8.3 |

Ward Summary
| Party | Votes | % Votes | Seats | Change |
|---|---|---|---|---|
| Conservative | 675 | 60.3 | 2 | +1 |
| Independent | 232 | 20.7 | 0 | 0 |
| Labour | 213 | 19.0 | 0 | -1 |
| Total Votes Cast | 1,120 | | | |
| Electorate | | | | |
| Turnout | | | | |

(Vote count shown is ward average)

=== Rural North Ward (1 seats) ===
Location of Rural North ward

Corby Borough Council Elections 2003: Rural North Ward
| Party | Candidate | Votes | % |
|---|---|---|---|
| Liberal Democrats | Philip Bromhall | 265 | 42.3 |
| Conservative | Paul Seaton | 250 | 39.9 |
| Labour | John Anderson | 111 | 17.7 |

Ward Summary
| Party | Votes | % Votes | Seats | Change |
|---|---|---|---|---|
| Liberal Democrats | 265 | 42.3 | 1 | +1 |
| Conservative | 250 | 39.9 | 0 | 0 |
| Labour | 111 | 17.7 | 0 | -1 |
| Total Votes Cast | 626 | | | |
| Electorate | | | | |
| Turnout | | | | |

(Vote count shown is ward average)

=== Rural West Ward (1 seat) ===
Location of Rural West ward

Corby Borough Council Elections 2003: Rural West Ward
| Party | Candidate | Votes | % |
|---|---|---|---|
| Conservative | Bob Rutt | 338 | 54.8 |
| Liberal Democrats | Sidney Beecroft | 143 | 23.2 |
| Labour | Gary McNeil | 136 | 22.0 |

Ward Summary
| Party | Votes | % Votes | Seats | Change |
|---|---|---|---|---|
| Conservative | 338 | 54.8 | 1 | +1 |
| Liberal Democrats | 143 | 23.2 | 0 | -1 |
| Labour | 136 | 22.0 | 0 | 0 |
| Total Votes Cast | 617 | | | |
| Electorate | | | | |
| Turnout | | | | |

(Vote count shown is ward average)

(Background: Bob Rutt defected from the Liberal Democrats after the 1999 Borough Council elections)

=== Shire Lodge (2 seats) ===
Location of Shire Lodge ward

Corby Borough Council Elections 2003: Shire Lodge Ward
| Party | Candidate | Votes | % |
|---|---|---|---|
| Labour | Raymond Beeby | 544 | 31.8 |
| Conservative | Alexander Torrie | 442 | 25.9 |
| Labour | Graham Bold | 412 | 24.1 |
| Independent | John Wood-Cowling | 311 | 18.2 |

Ward Summary
| Party | Votes | % Votes | Seats | Change |
|---|---|---|---|---|
| Labour | 478 | 38.8 | 1 | -1 |
| Conservative | 442 | 35.9 | 1 | +1 |
| Independent | 311 | 25.3 | 0 | 0 |
| Total Votes Cast | 1,231 | | | |
| Electorate | | | | |
| Turnout | | | | |

(Vote count shown is ward average)

=== West Ward (2 seats) ===
Location of West ward

Corby Borough Council Elections 2003: West Ward
| Party | Candidate | Votes | % |
|---|---|---|---|
| Labour | William Latta | 500 | 36.7 |
| Labour | Thomas Beattie | 437 | 32.1 |
| Independent | Raymond Telfer | 424 | 31.2 |

Ward Summary
| Party | Votes | % Votes | Seats | Change |
|---|---|---|---|---|
| Labour | 469 | 52.5 | 2 | 0 |
| Independent | 424 | 47.5 | 0 | 0 |
| Total Votes Cast | 893 | | | |
| Electorate | | | | |
| Turnout | | | | |

(Vote count shown is ward average)

== See also ==
- Corby (UK Parliament constituency)
