= Borough of Corby =

- Non-metropolitan district and borough
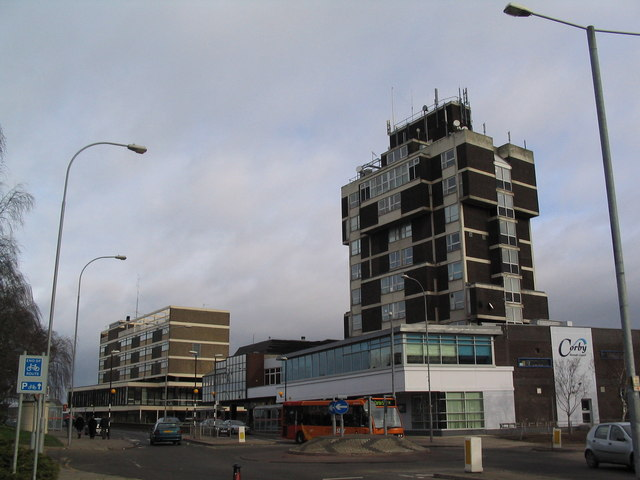
- Corby town centre (January 2007)

- Borough of Corby shown within Northamptonshire
- Coordinates: 52.4914°N 0.69645°W
- Sovereign state: United Kingdom
- Constituent country: England
- Region: East Midlands
- Non-metropolitan county: Northamptonshire
- Status: Non-metropolitan district
- Admin HQ: Corby

Government
  - Type: Non-metropolitan district council
  - Borough council: Corby Borough Council ( )

Area
  - Total: 31.00 sq mi (80.28 km^{2})

Population (2019)
  - Total: 72,218
  - Density: 2,330/sq mi (899.6/km^{2})
- Time zone: UTC0 (GMT)
  - Summer (DST): UTC+1 (BST)
- Postcodes: NN17-NN18
- Area code: 01536
- ONS code: 34UB (ONS); E07000150 (GSS)
- OS grid reference: SP897887
- Website: www.corby.gov.uk

Corby was a non-metropolitan district with borough status in the county of Northamptonshire, England. It bordered East Northamptonshire to the east, Kettering to the south and west, the Harborough district of Leicestershire to the north-west, and the county of Rutland to the north-east. In 2021 the district had a population of 75,571. The council, Corby Borough Council was based at the Cube in the town of Corby.

== Civil parishes ==
Corby unparished area within the former district

The area covered by the pre 1974 district was unparished, the district also contained the civil parishes of Cottingham, East Carlton, Gretton, Middleton, Rockingham, Stanion and Weldon. On 1 April 2021 when the district was abolished the unparished area was parished.

== Wards ==
Corby district contained the wards of Beanfield, Central, Danesholme, Kingswood & Hazel Leys, Lodge Park, Lloyds, Oakley North, Oakley South, Rowlett, Rural West, Stanion & Corby Village and Weldon & Gretton.

== History ==
The district was formed on 1 April 1974, under the Local Government Act 1972, by a merger of Corby Urban District and part of Kettering Rural District. In 1993 it was granted borough status.

== Abolition ==
The district was abolished on 1 April 2021 and merged with East Northamptonshire, Kettering and Wellingborough to form the North Northamptonshire unitary authority area.

== See also ==
- Corby Borough Council elections
